= Republicrat =

Portmanteau of American political parties

Republicrat, Repubmocrat, or Demopublican, also variously called Repubocrat, Demican, Democan, and Republocrat, are portmanteau names for both of the two major political parties in the United States, the Republican Party and the Democratic Party, collectively. These derogatory names first appeared in the 1872 United States presidential election.

The terms have multiple meanings. One use is to insult politicians that the speaker believes are too politically moderate or centrist. This use is similar to saying that a Republican is a "Republican in Name Only" (RINO) or a Democrat is a "Democrat in Name Only" (DINO). Another use is to indicate that the two major parties are essentially interchangeable from the speaker's perspective because neither major party supports the changes that the speaker wants to see. This often carries an unspoken implication that the U.S. is in spirit a dominant-party system. Similar terms have been adopted in other countries, including Australia, Canada, Poland, and the United Kingdom.

== Usage ==
=== Insult towards moderates ===
Republicans have often portrayed themselves to be pro-business and aggressive on foreign policy; Democrats have tended to campaign on more liberal social policies and a more important role for government-funded social programs. Merriam-Webster Dictionary defines it as "a member of the Democratic party esp. in the southern states who supports to a large extent the policy and measures of the Republican party". Oxford Dictionaries defines the term as "[a] person whose political philosophy is a blend of policies and principles from both the Republican and Democratic parties".

The term is sometimes used in a pejorative sense by members of one party to attack members of their party who are either centrist or who have what they perceive to be the wrong ideology. Liberal Democrats have disparaged conservative and centrist members of the party, such as Senator Joe Lieberman, as Republicrats. Likewise, Republican politicians, such as George W. Bush, Mitt Romney, Newt Gingrich, and Arnold Schwarzenegger, have been called "Republicrats" by conservatives due to their liberal stances on various political issues. Another term used by liberal Democrats to describe conservative and centrist members of their party is "Democrat in Name Only" or "DINO"; a conservative Republican term for liberal and centrist Republicans is "Republican in Name Only" or "RINO".

=== Argument that Democrats and Republicans are interchangeable ===
The term can be used to put the words together in order to voice the opinion that the two mainstream American political parties are so ideologically similar as to be interchangeable. This usage often expresses the sentiment of ordinary citizens who see all politicians as serving the same special interests and make little distinction between the two parties. Earl Killian's U.S. political glossary defines the term as "a portmanteau of the words 'Republican' and 'Democrat' ... used to symbolize the one-party nature of U.S. politics, when it comes to issues on which the dominant parties of the two-party system agree ... . In this view ... Republicrats is then the name of the single U.S. political party, and the Republicans and Democrats are seen as factions of this one-party system, rather than as true independent parties." An example of this view comes from Noam Chomsky, who said: "The United States effectively has a one-party system, the business party, with two factions, Republicans and Democrats."

Some commentators, such as right-wing talk radio host Michael Savage and left-wing activist Ralph Nader, who have both used the terms, opined on how it is often hard to tell the parties apart, leading to the term's popularity. This was a view shared on the American Left by the Green Party during the 2000 United States presidential election, for whom Nader ran, whose bumper stickers read "Bush and Gore make me want to Ralph". Former Dead Kennedys vocalist and Green Party member Jello Biafra also used the term during interviews. In 2004, boxing promoter Don King told Larry King he was a Republicrat. He defined it as being for "whoever's going to be doing something or the upward mobility of America, black and white alike".

== Equivalent terms in other countries ==
An equivalent term used in the United Kingdom is "Lib–Lab–Con" or "LibLabCon", a pejorative portmanteau referring to the three main political parties (the Liberal Democrats, the Labour Party, and the Conservative Party). The equivalent term used in Canada is "Lib–NDP–Con" or "LibNDPCon", a pejorative portmanteau referring to the three main political parties (the Liberal Party, the New Democratic Party, and the Conservative Party). Similarly, another equivalent term used in Australia is "Lib–Lab–Nat" or "LibLabNat", a pejorative portmanteau referring to the three main political parties (the Liberal Party, the Labor Party, and the National Party). All three of these epithets suggest that there are no real differences between the three major parties in Australia, Canada, or the United Kingdom, each of which is effectively a single-party system. An equivalent term is also used in Poland, where it is called "POPiS", a pejorative portmanteau referring to the two main political parties (the Civic Platform and Law and Justice).

== See also ==
- Bipartisanship in US politics
- Boll weevil (politics)
- Duverger's law
- Problem Solvers Caucus
- Rockefeller Republican
- Southern Democrats
- Third party (United States)
- Two-party system
- Uniparty
