= Independent Democrat =

U.S. politician aligned with, but not belonging to, the Democratic Party

In U.S. politics, an independent Democrat is an individual who is loosely associated with the Democratic Party but forgoes membership in the party to remain an independent, or is denied the Democratic nomination in a caucus or primary election. Independent Democrats are not a political party unto themselves and have varying political views; stances significantly to the right or left of the party mainstream are a common reason for becoming an independent Democrat.

== Active members ==
=== U.S. Congress ===
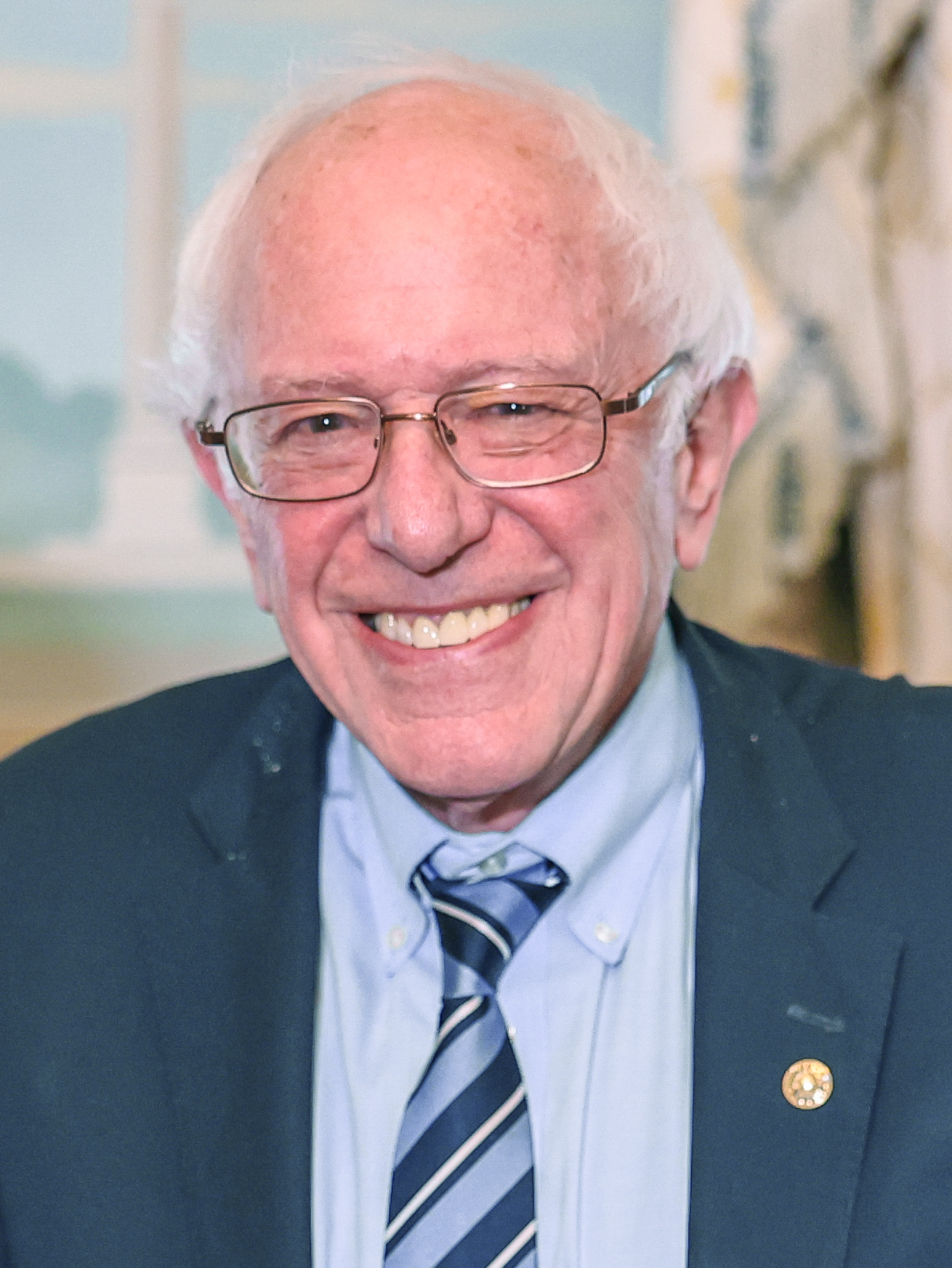
Bernie Sanders

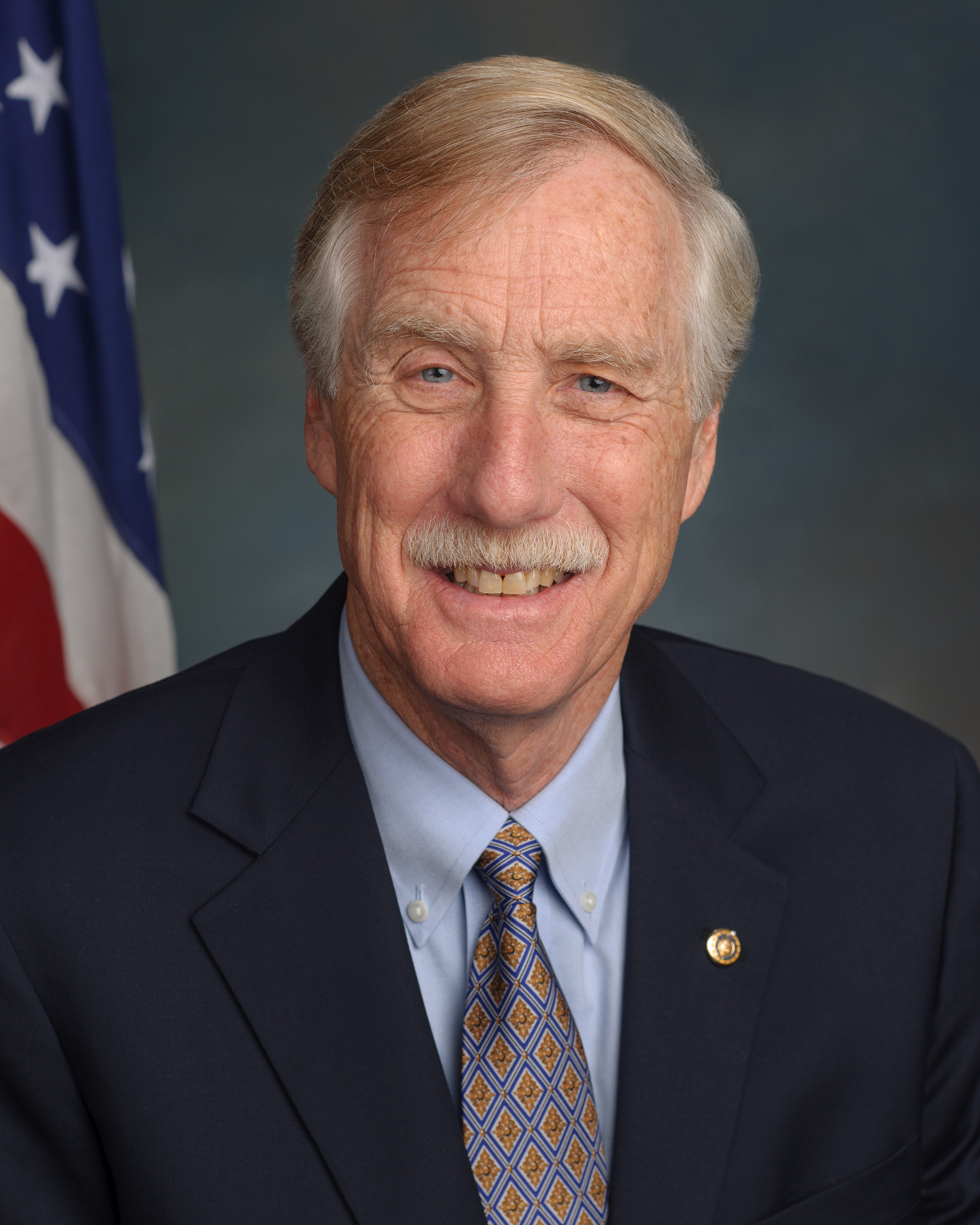
Angus King

In the 119th Congress, two politically independent U.S. Senators caucus with the Democrats:

- Angus King, Maine (2013–present), 72nd Governor of Maine (1995–2003)
- Bernie Sanders, Vermont (2007–present), U.S. Representative from VT-AL (1991–2007)

=== State Legislators ===
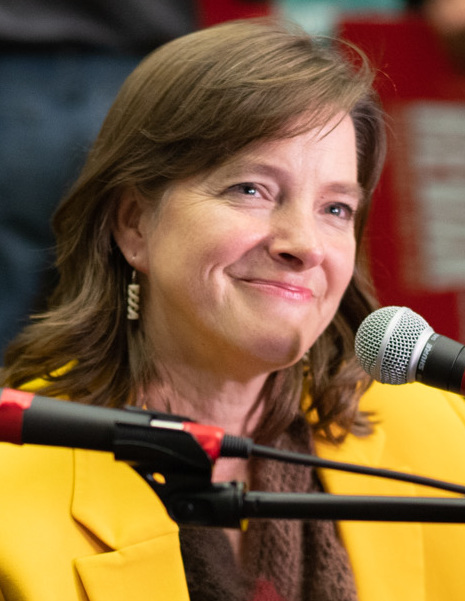
Alyse Galvin

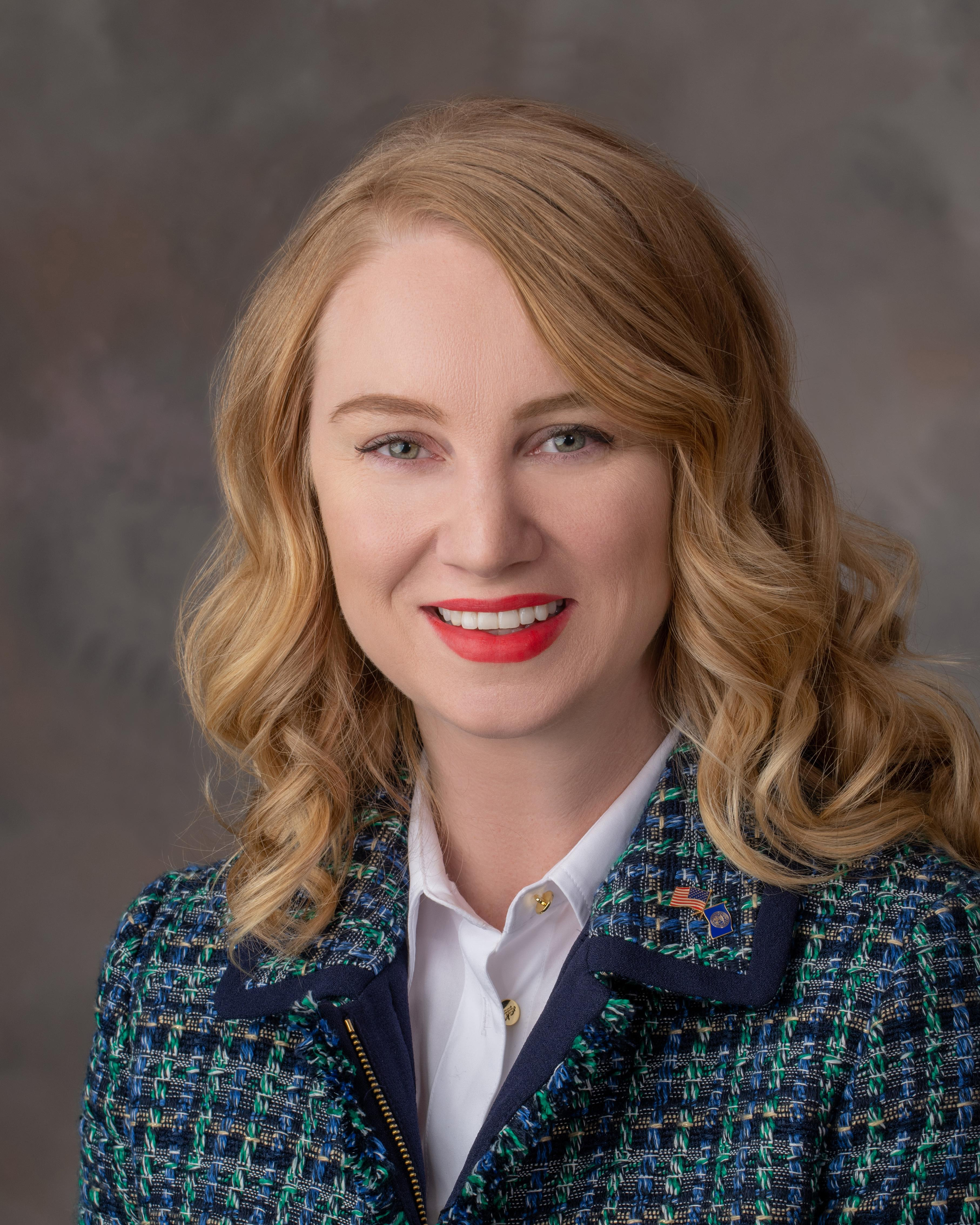
Megan Hunt

There are eight politically independent state legislators that caucus with the Democrats or consistently vote with the party:

- Alyse Galvin, Member of the Alaska House of Representatives (2023–present)
- Rebecca Himschoot, Member of the Alaska House of Representatives (2023–present)
- Megan Hunt, Member of the Nebraska Legislature (2019–present)
- Jed Lipsky, Member of the Vermont House of Representatives (2023–present)
- Bill Pluecker, (Note: Pluecker does not officially caucus with the Democrats, but he chairs the Agriculture, Conservation, & Forestry Committee in the Democratic majority and consistently votes with the party.) Member of the Maine House of Representatives (2018–present)
- Calvin Schrage, Minority Leader of the Alaska House of Representatives (2023–2025), Member of the Alaska House of Representatives (2021–present)
- Laura Sibilia, Member of the Vermont House of Representatives (2015–present)
- Shanda Yates, Member of the Mississippi House of Representatives (2020–present)

Similarly, there are independent legislators in territorial legislatures that caucus with, vote with, or are in coalition with Democratic members. In the Northern Mariana Islands House of Representatives, 12 of its 16 independent members are in a coalition with all 4 of its Democratic members. Additionally, the Council of the District of Columbia, which is dominated by Democratic politicians, has placed restrictions on the number of majority party candidates in its four at-large seats. As a result, there two de jure independent members that are independent democrats that were required to resign their membership:

- Christina Henderson, member of the Council of the District of Columbia (2021–present)
- Elissa Silverman, member of the Council of the District of Columbia (2026–present)

== History ==
=== 19th century ===
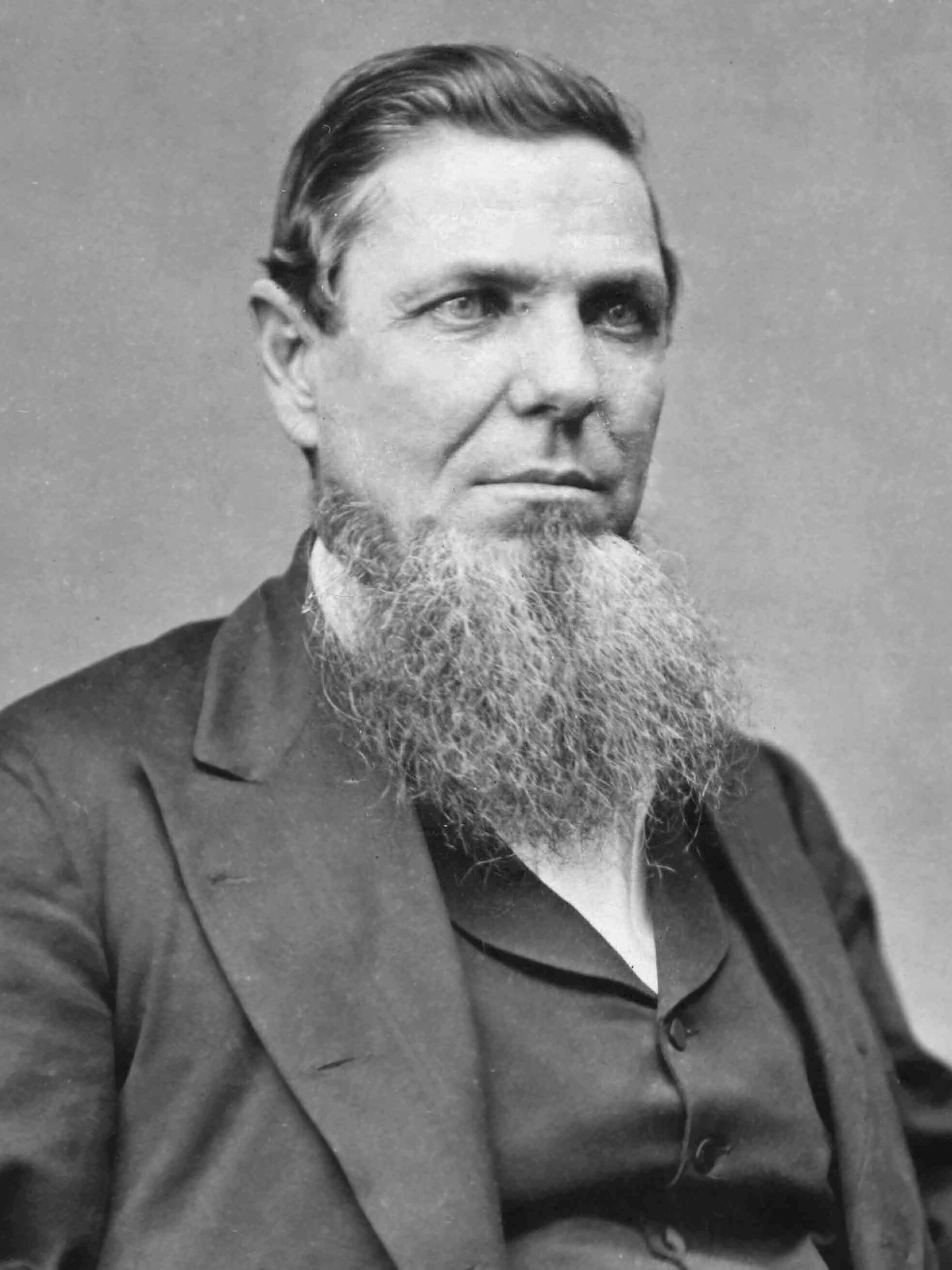
Andrew Jackson Hamilton

The first member of the United States House of Representatives to identify as an independent Democrat was Zadok Casey of Illinois, who served from 1833 to 1843. Casey was a Jacksonian Democrat before becoming an independent.

In 1848, a candidate for Mayor of Chicago, James Hutchinson Woodworth, labelled himself an independent Democrat to distance himself from what was at the time a corrupt and disorganized Chicago Democratic Party organization; he preferred being described as an independent Democrat rather than as a Whig as that party was itself experiencing a transition. Woodworth won the 1848 Chicago mayoral election against Democrat James Curtiss with 59% of the vote. He won re-election with 80% of the vote in the 1849 election. Woodworth later served one term in the U.S. House of Representatives as a member of the Republican Party.

Andrew Jackson Hamilton of Texas briefly served in the U.S. House of Representatives as an independent Democrat. He later served as the 11th Governor of Texas and became a member of the Republican party.

=== 20th century ===
Strom Thurmond of South Carolina was elected to the United States Senate in 1954 and served as an independent Democrat in the 84th Congress until his resignation on April 4, 1956. In November of that year he was elected as a Democrat to fill the vacancy created by his resignation. Thurmond later became a member of the Republican Party in 1964.

Harry F. Byrd Jr., a senator from Virginia, left the Democratic Party in 1970. He continued to caucus with the Democrats and referred to himself as an independent Democrat.

Patrick Lucey was a Democrat who ran as an independent as a vice-presidential candidate in 1980 with John B. Anderson.

David Orr, who served as Mayor of Chicago briefly in 1987, entered politics as an independent Democrat.

=== 21st century ===
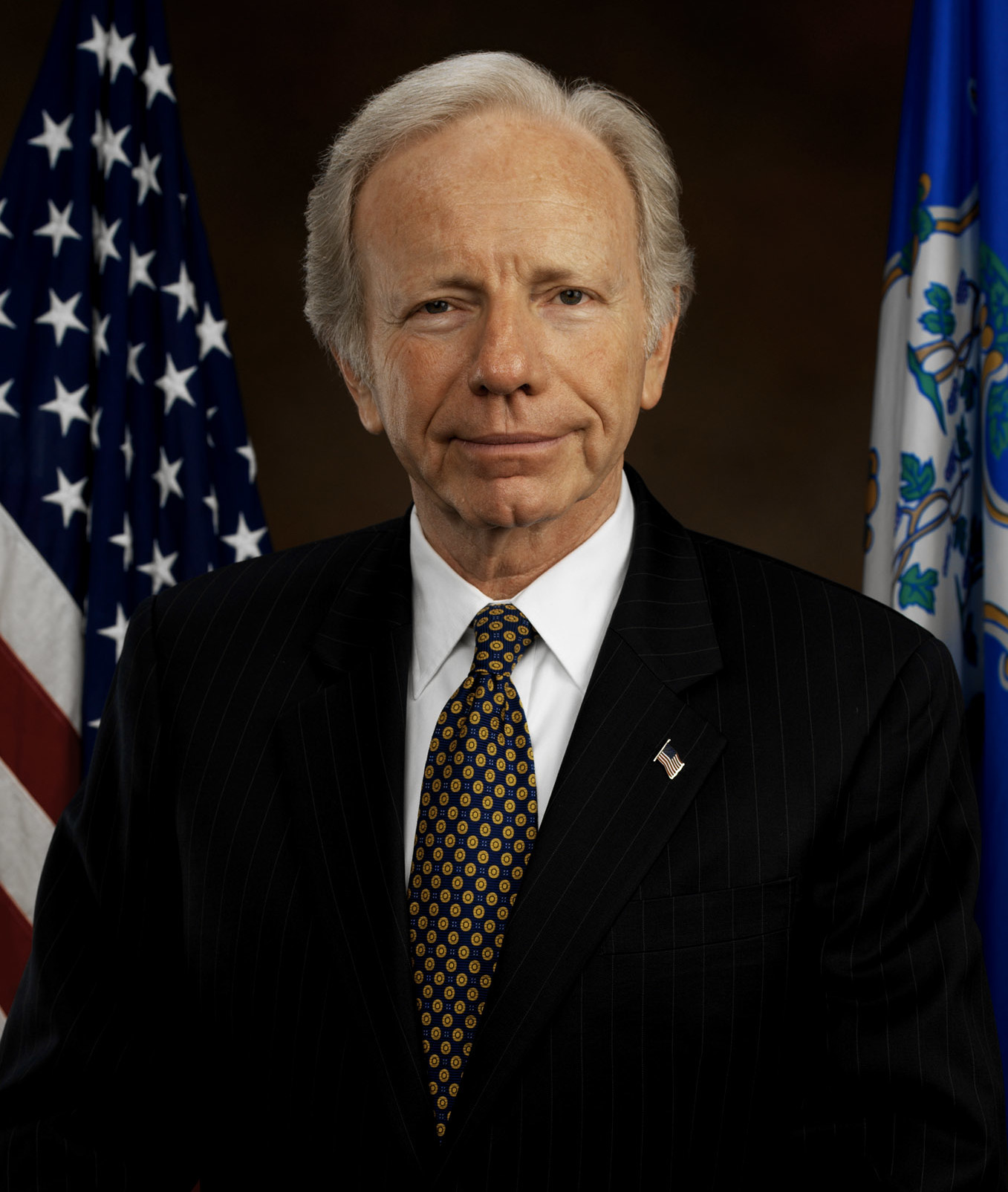
Joe Lieberman

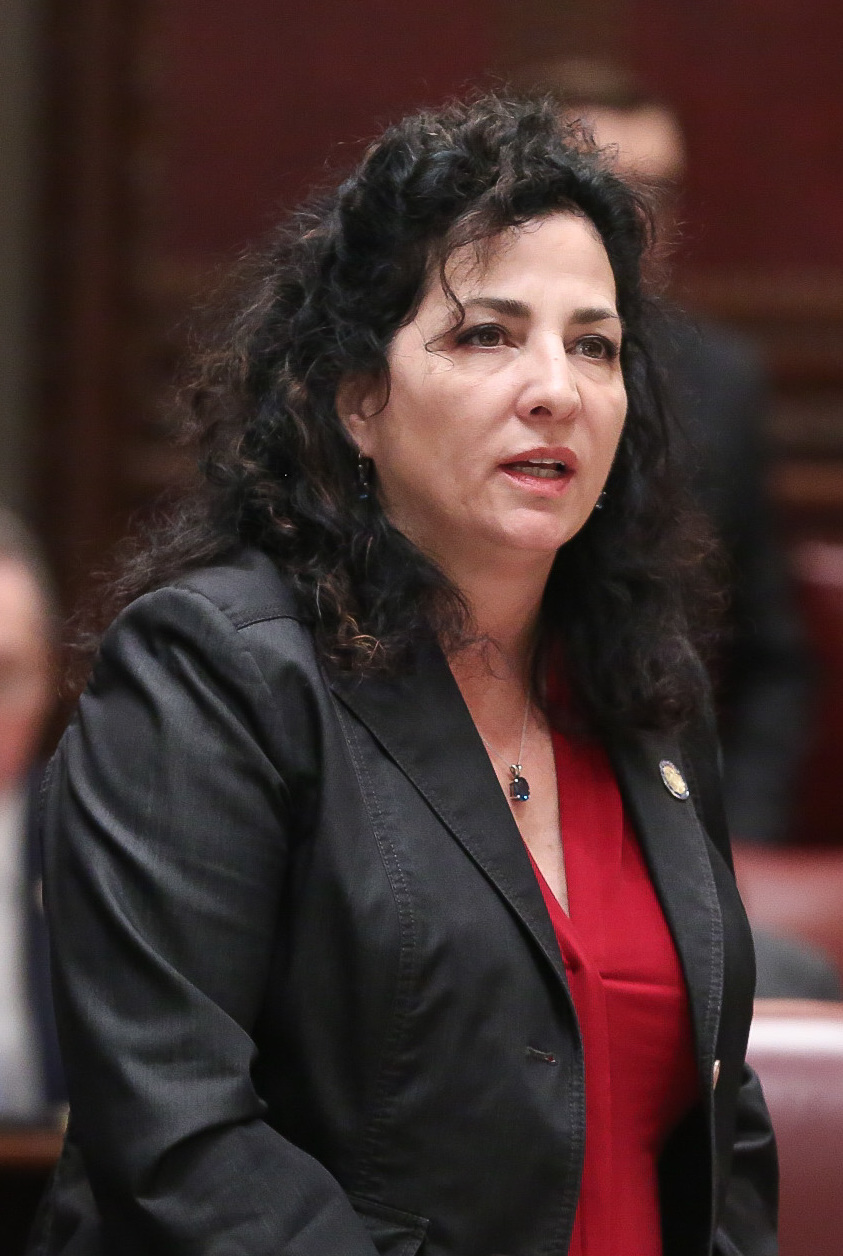
Diane Savino

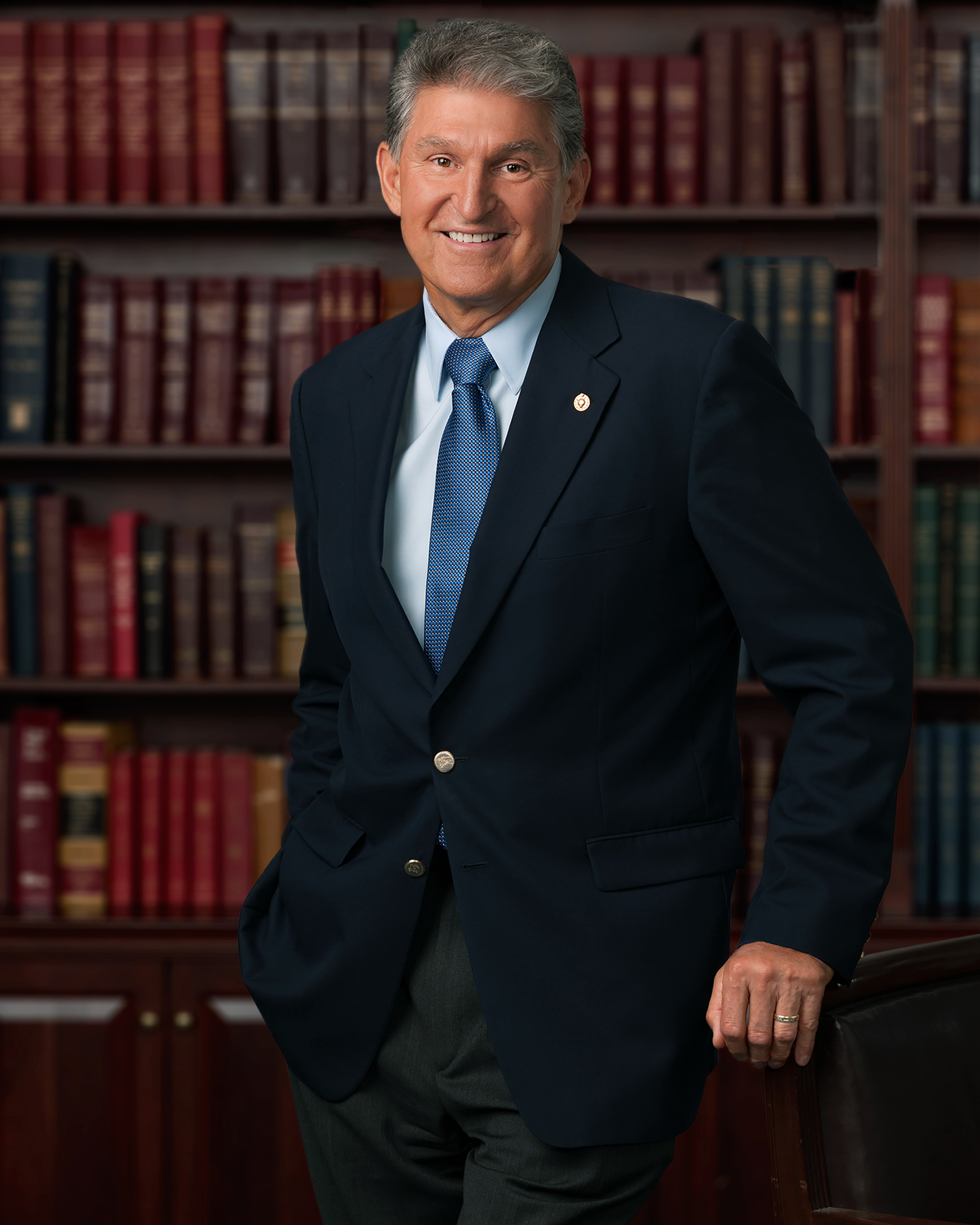
Joe Manchin

After failing to be re-nominated in the 2006 Democratic primary, U.S. Senator Joe Lieberman of Connecticut created a new party called the Connecticut for Lieberman party. He had lost the nomination to his own seat to Ned Lamont by a 52% to 48% margin. Lieberman won the general election with 49.7% of the vote to Lamont's 39.7%. He had stated while campaigning that if elected he would continue to caucus with the Democrats. Within the week following the election, Lieberman stated that he was "an Independent Democrat, capital I, capital D," and that he had specified as much to the secretary of the Senate. He continued to caucus with the Senate Democrats who had a slim majority in the 110th Congress. Lieberman remained a registered independent until he left Congress in 2013.

Four members of the New York State Senate – Jeffrey Klein, Diane Savino, David Valesky, and David Carlucci – indicated they would form a similarly designated caucus separate from the Democratic conference in 2011, known as the Independent Democratic Conference (IDC). Following the 2009 New York State Senate Leadership Crisis the IDC formed a coalition government with then New York Senate Republican leader Dean Skelos to give Republicans control of the New York State Senate. In April 2018, the IDC announced they would dissolve and following the primary defeat of six of the eight members in the 2018 elections, returning the New York State Senate to Democratic control in 2019.

U.S. Senator Bernie Sanders of Vermont, the longest-serving independent politician in congressional history, was initially denied caucus membership by the Democratic Party, however he eventually caucused with the party in both the U.S House of Representatives and the U.S. Senate. He has criticized the Democratic Party from a socialist perspective, though sought the Democratic nomination for president in 2016 and 2020.

U.S. Senator Angus King served as Governor of Maine from 1995 to 2003, and was the only Independent governor in the United States during that period. He positioned himself as a centrist during his tenure, and later ran for Senate in 2012 on the same premise. He has caucused with Senate Democrats since 2013, and briefly considered caucusing with Republicans after the 2014 Senate elections.

In the 118th Congress, two senators elected with the Democratic Party switched their affiliations to independent. U.S. Senator Kyrsten Sinema of Arizona was elected as a Democrat in 2018, switching her affiliation to Independent in December 2022, effective upon commencement of the 118th Congress. She opted to caucus with neither party, while maintaining her seniority and committee assignments through the Senate Democratic Caucus. Sinema did not seek re-election in 2024. U.S. Senator Joe Manchin of West Virginia was elected as a conservative Democrat in 2010, and re-elected to subsequent terms in 2012 and 2018. Prior to his retirement in 2024, he switched his afflilation from Democratic to Independent, while caucusing with Democrats for the remainder of the 118th Congress.

U.S. Congressional candidates Cara Mund, Evan McMullin, and Al Gross have all run as independents while receiving endorsements or support from their respective states' Democratic Parties in traditionally Republican states.

== See also ==
- Blue Dog Coalition
- Conservative Democrat
- Democrat in name only (DINO)
- Independent Republican, the Republican Party counterpart.
- Teal independents, Australian centrist independents
- New Democrats
- Congressional Progressive Caucus
- National Democratic Party
- National Democratic Party of Alabama
- Straight-Out Democratic Party
