= 2020 United States House of Representatives election in Alaska =

2020 United States House of Representatives election in Alaska's at-large district
- November 3, 2020
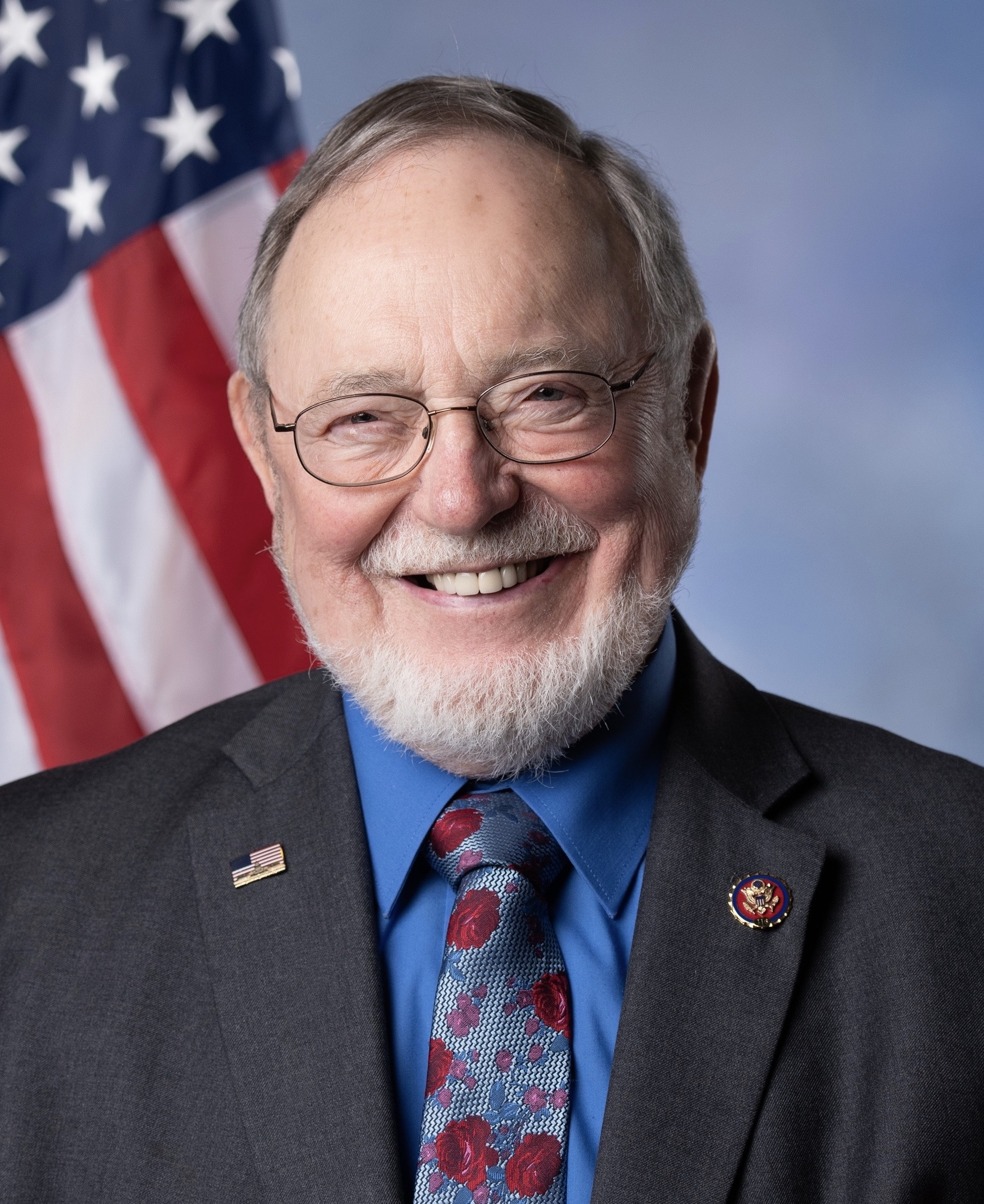

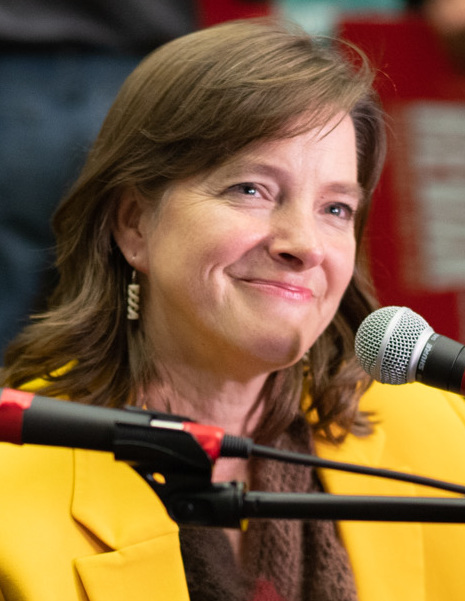
Nominee	Don Young	Alyse Galvin
Party	Republican	Independent
Alliance		Democratic
Popular vote	192,126	159,856
Percentage	54.40%	45.26%
- Young: 50–60% 60–70% 70–80% 80–90% Galvin: 50–60% 60–70% 70–80% >80% Tie: 50% No votes
U.S. Representative before election
Don Young
Republican
Elected U.S. Representative
Don Young
Republican

The 2020 United States House of Representatives election in Alaska was held on November 3, 2020, to elect the U.S. representative from Alaska's at-large congressional district. The election coincided with the 2020 U.S. presidential election, as well as other elections to the House of Representatives, elections to the United States Senate and various state and local elections.

This was Don Young's last re-election as he died in office on March 18, 2022. This was the last Alaska congressional election conducted by plurality voting.

== Background ==
The incumbent in this election was Republican Don Young, who was re-elected with 53.1% of the vote in 2018, in what was one of the closest elections of his long career. Young was the longest-tenured member of the U.S. House of Representatives, having been first elected in a 1973 special election. He served on several committees including as a ranking member of a House Natural Resources subcommittee. In 2019, Young introduced 37 bills, four of which made it out of committee.

Challenging Young was independent candidate Alyse Galvin, a small-business owner, former teacher, and founder of the non-profit Great Alaska Schools. Galvin has never held public office. Her platform focused on addressing climate change, increasing funding for public schools, and lowering health care costs. Galvin ran as an independent and also received the Democratic Party nomination.

== Republican primary ==
=== Candidates ===
==== Declared ====
- Gerald L. Heikes
- Thomas "John" Nelson, businessman and candidate for this seat in 2018
- Don Young, incumbent U.S. representative

=== Results ===
Republican primary results
Party	Candidate	Votes	%
Republican	Don Young (incumbent)	51,972	76.13%
Republican	Thomas "John" Nelson	12,344	18.08%
Republican	Geral Heikes	3,954	5.79%
Total votes		68,270	100.0%

== Democratic primary ==
=== Candidates ===
==== Declared ====
- Alyse Galvin (independent), public education advocate and nominee for Alaska's at-large congressional district in 2018
- Bill Hibler (Democratic), candidate for Alaska's at-large congressional district in 2016
- Ray Sean Tugatuk (Democratic)

=== Endorsements ===
Alyse Galvin

Organizations

- Alaska Center
- End Citizens United
- J Street PAC
- National Education Association
- National Women's Political Caucus

=== Results ===
Democratic–Libertarian–Independence primary results
Party	Candidate	Votes	%
Independent	Alyse Galvin	53,258	85.83%
Democratic	Ray Tugatuk	4,858	7.83%
Democratic	Bill Hibler	3,931	6.34%
Total votes		62,047	100.0%

== Independents ==
=== Withdrawn ===
- Thomas Lamb

== General election ==
=== Predictions ===
Source	Ranking	As of
The Cook Political Report	Lean R	November 2, 2020
Inside Elections	Likely R	October 28, 2020
Sabato's Crystal Ball	Lean R	November 2, 2020
Politico	Lean R	November 2, 2020
Daily Kos	Lean R	November 2, 2020
RCP	Likely R	November 2, 2020

=== Polling ===
View source data.

Poll source	Date(s) administered	Sample size (Note: Key: A – all adults RV – registered voters LV – likely voters V – unclear)	Margin of error	Don Young (R)	Alyse Galvin (I)	Other	Undecided
Gravis Marketing	October 26–28, 2020	770 (LV)	± 3.5%	49%	44%	–	7%
Siena College/NYT Upshot	October 9–14, 2020	423 (LV)	± 5.7%	49%	41%	2% (Note: "Someone else" and would not vote with 1%)	9% (Note: Includes "Refused")
Alaska Survey Research	September 25 – October 4, 2020	696 (LV)	–	46%	48%	–	6%
Public Policy Polling (D)	July 7–8, 2020	1,081 (V)	± 3.0%	41%	43%	–	16%
Data for Progress (D) (Note: Data for Progress supports Democratic candidates, and Galvin is seeking the Democratic nomination as an independent in AK-at-large.)	May 21–27, 2020	589 (LV)	± 4.0%	42%	43%	–	15%

=== Results ===
2020 Alaska's at-large congressional district election
Party	Candidate	Votes	%	±%
Republican	Don Young (incumbent)	192,126	54.40%	+1.32%
Independent	Alyse Galvin (Note: Galvin ran as an independent with the nomination of the Democratic Party.)	159,856	45.26%	–1.24%
Write-in		1,183	0.34%	–0.08%
Total votes		353,165	100.0%	
Republican hold				

==== Boroughs and census areas that flipped from Republican to Democratic ====
- Denali Borough (largest town: Healy)
- Lake and Peninsula Borough (largest town: King Salmon)

==== Boroughs and census areas that flipped from Democratic to Republican ====
- Prince of Wales-Hyder Census Area (largest town: Craig)

== Notes ==
Partisan clients
