= John DiStaso =

American journalist (1954–2022)

- Born: John Joseph DiStaso; February 18, 1954; Paterson, New Jersey, U.S.
- Died: April 21, 2022 (aged 68); Manchester, New Hampshire, U.S.
- Education: Villanova University; William Paterson University
- Occupation: Journalist
- Spouse: Diane Randazza (m. 1979)
- Children: 2

John Joseph DiStaso (February 18, 1954 – April 21, 2022) was an American political journalist from New Hampshire.

== Early life ==
DiStaso was born and raised in Paterson, New Jersey. He received a bachelor's degree in English literature from Villanova University in 1975 and a master's degree in communications from William Paterson University in 1979.

== Career ==
DiStaso began his career with the New Hampshire Union Leader as a correspondent before becoming a staff reporter in the early 1980s. Beginning in 1982, DiStaso wrote the newspaper's political column, "The Granite Status." He was particularly well known for his work during the New Hampshire presidential primaries, interviewing and candidates participating in the contest as well as moderating debates, and is also credited with the earliest use of the phrase "Republican in Name Only" in 1992.

During the 2008 U.S. presidential election, DiStaso was credited with a "definitive interview" with John McCain in which McCain rebutted rumors he was planning to withdraw from the race. In 2015, DiStaso was cited as among the first journalists to confirm that Donald Trump was running for president of the United States.

== Personal life and death ==
DiStaso was a resident of New Boston, New Hampshire. In 1979, he married Diane Randazza, and they had two children. DiStaso died from pancreatic cancer in Manchester, New Hampshire on April 21, 2022, aged 68.
