= Bipartisanship in United States politics =

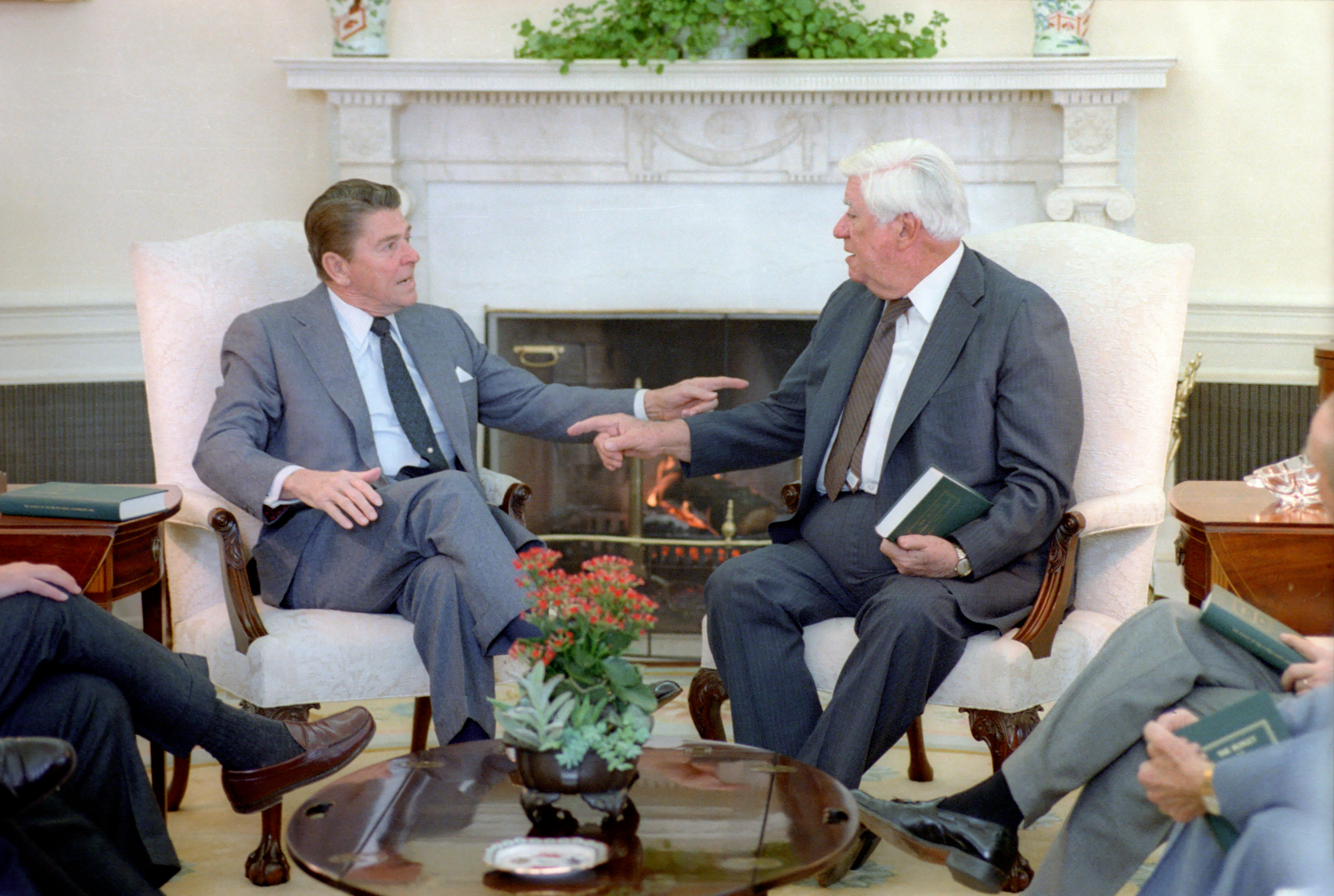
Republican president Ronald Reagan discusses the 1984 budget with Democratic speaker Tip O'Neill.

American politics has often settled into a two-party system, which as well as involving conflict between the two parties has also involved long periods of bipartisanship.

== Background ==
James Madison argued in The Federalist Papers that factionalism was a danger to democracy, as it involved groups pushing their interests to the detriment of the national interest. The Founders were largely nonpartisan, and did not think that political parties would play a role in American politics.

However, political parties have long been a major force in US politics, and in its history, the nation has alternated between periods of intense party rivalry and partisanship, as well as periods of bipartisanship.

== Periods of bipartisanship ==
There have been periods of bipartisanship in American politics, such as when Republican Abraham Lincoln selected Democrat Andrew Johnson as his running mate for vice president. Republicans supported legislation by Democratic president Lyndon B. Johnson in the early 1960s, and when Democrats worked with Republican president Ronald Reagan in the 1980s. It is claimed that the non-partisanship in foreign policy was a precursor to the concept of modern bipartisanship in US politics. This was articulated in 1912 by President William Howard Taft, who stated that the fundamental foreign policies of the United States should be raised above party differences.

More recently, this was also shown in the case of President George H. W. Bush's administration, which began with an atmosphere of bipartisanship on foreign policy in Washington. During this period, the concept of bipartisanship implied a consensus not only between the two parties but also the executive and legislative branches of the government to implement foreign policy. This was seen in the article Bipartisan Objectives for American Foreign Policy, authored by Henry Kissinger, President Richard Nixon's Secretary of State, and Cyrus Vance, who was secretary during President Jimmy Carter's administration.

== Oppositional politics since 2010s ==
In the 2010s, there was wide disagreement between the Republicans and Democrats, because the minority party had been voting as a bloc against major legislation, according to James Fallows. In 2010 (Barack Obama had begun his presidency on January 20, 2009), the minority party (then the Republicans) had the ability to "discipline its ranks" so that none join the majority, and this situation in the Congress is unprecedented, according to Fallows. He saw this inability to have bipartisanship as evidence of a "structural failure of the American government." Adviser to Obama, Rahm Emanuel, said the period from 2008–2010 was marked by extreme partisanship. After the U.S. elections of 2010, with sizeable gains by Republicans in the House and Senate, analyst Charles Babington of the Associated Press suggested that both parties remained far apart on major issues such as immigration and Medicare, and there may be chances for agreement about lesser issues such as electric cars, nuclear power, and tax breaks for businesses; Babington was not optimistic about chances for bipartisanship on major issues in the next few years.

In 2010, analyst Benedict Carey (The New York Times) agreed that political analysts tend to agree that the government will continue to be divided and marked by paralysis and feuding, there was research suggesting that humans have a "profound capacity through which vicious adversaries can form alliances," according to Berkeley professor Dacher Keltner. According to Robert Siegel (National Public Radio (NPR)), there was virtually no cooperation between Democrats and Republicans in the U.S. during the few years before 2010.

An analysis in March 2010 suggested that the then state of American politics was marked by oppositional politics which left the voters cynical about the process. Bipartisanship requires "hard work", is "sometimes dull", and entails trying to find "common ground" but enables "serious problem solving", according to editorial writers at The Christian Science Monitor in 2010.

== Impact ==
According to political analyst James Fallows in The Atlantic (based on a "note from someone with many decades' experience in national politics"), bipartisanship is a phenomenon belonging to a two-party system such as the political system of the United States and does not apply to a parliamentary system (such as Great Britain) since the minority party is not involved in helping write legislation or voting for it. Fallows argues that in a two-party system, the minority party can be obstructionist and thwart the actions of the majority party. Although, Anne Applebaum has argued that the United Kingdom often has a bipartisan approach to politics despite appearances.

A call for bipartisanship is often made by presidents who "can't get their way in Congress," according to one view. Military policies of the Cold War and actions like the Iraq War were promoted and supported, through the mass media, as bipartisan acts.

== See also ==
- Gridlock (politics)
- Problem Solvers Caucus, consisting of members of both major parties in Congress
- Uniparty
