= Charles Stenholm =

American politician (1938–2023)

Charlie Stenholm
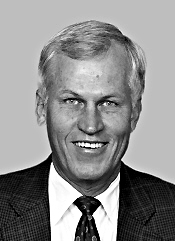

Ranking Member of the House Agriculture Committee
- In office January 3, 1997 – January 3, 2005
- Preceded by: Kika de la Garza
- Succeeded by: Collin Peterson

Member of the U.S. House of Representatives from Texas's 17th district
- In office January 3, 1979 – January 3, 2005
- Preceded by: Omar Burleson
- Succeeded by: Randy Neugebauer (redistricted)

Personal details
- Born: Charles Walter Stenholm; October 26, 1938 Stamford, Texas, U.S.
- Died: May 17, 2023 (aged 84) Granbury, Texas, U.S.
- Party: Democratic
- Education: Tarleton State University; Texas Tech University (BS, MS)

Charles Walter Stenholm (October 26, 1938 – May 17, 2023) was an American businessman and Democratic Party politician from a rural district of the state of Texas. After establishing himself as owner-operator of a large cotton farm, he entered politics and was elected to Congress in his first run for office. Stenholm was a Democratic Party member of the United States House of Representatives for 13 terms, representing Texas's 17th congressional district from 1979 to 2005.

He was known for his conservative social positions, helping garner conservative Democratic support for President Ronald Reagan's tax cuts in 1981, and gaining passage of a new farm bill in 2002 that doubled farm subsidies for Texas agribusiness. In 1992 he supported an amendment to require the federal government to have balanced budgets. He prioritized rural and agriculture issues and is considered one of the leading architects of federal farm policy.

After leaving Congress when defeated by a Republican in 2004, Stenholm stayed in Washington, DC. He worked as a lobbyist for food and agricultural interests, primarily with Olsson Frank Weeda, a law and lobbying firm in Washington, DC.

== Early life and education ==
Stenholm was born in 1938 in Ericksdahl, Texas (sometimes identified as Stamford), a farming community in Jones County that was settled in the early 20th century largely by Swedish immigrants, including his grandparents. His parents Lambert and Irene Constance Stenholm raised him on their plantation-scale, 2000-acre farm near Abilene. They cultivated mostly cotton as a commodity crop. After attending public schools, Stenholm graduated from Texas Tech University, with a B.S. (1961) and an M.S. (1962) in Agriculture Education. He was a member of the Sigma Alpha Epsilon fraternity.

Stenholm took over his family farm, raising cotton and also having a cattle ranch. He operated the large cotton farm in Stamford for many years. He also worked as a vocational teacher. He married Cynthia Watson and they had three children together.

He began a career in agricultural politics when he was appointed to be member of the Texas State Agricultural Stabilization and Conservation Service during the administration of President Jimmy Carter. He also served as an executive of the Rolling Plains Cotton Growers Association before being elected to Congress.

== Congressional career ==
Stenholm had gotten increasingly interested in politics. In 1965 he became a lobbyist for the Rolling Plains Cotton Growers Association. In late 1978 longtime Democratic Congressman Omar Burleson decided to resign from his office representing Texas's 17th congressional district, a vast and mostly rural district which stretched from San Angelo to the western fringes of the Dallas-Fort Worth Metroplex. Seeing an opportunity, Stenholm ran in his first campaign as a Democrat, and finished first in a crowded seven-way primary before winning the runoff with 67 percent of the vote. He then breezed to victory in November.

Stenholm established a reputation as one of the most conservative Democrats in the House, and belonged to the Blue Dog Coalition. He was a leader of the Boll Weevils during the 1980s, and Chair of the Conservative Democratic Forum from 1981 until about 1993. In 1981, Stenholm was one of the more prominent Democratic supporters of Republican President Ronald Reagan's tax-cut package. A decade later, he said he regretted that support.

Like many Texas politicians, Stenholm was conservative on certain social issues; he opposed both abortion and gun control. In 1990 he was one of three House Democrats who voted against the Americans with Disabilities Act of 1990.

Stenholm frequently clashed with Democratic President Bill Clinton during his administration; he voted for three of the four articles of impeachment against him. But Stenholm was also a severe critic of the succeeding Republican George W. Bush Administration's fiscal policy. He voted against making Bush's tax cuts permanent, as by then he strongly opposed cutting taxes unless the budget was balanced.

=== Agriculture policy ===
As a large farmer, Stenholm was chiefly interested in agriculture and also in budget matters. In 1992 he supported a balanced budget amendment to the Constitution requiring the federal government to keep to such budgets. He is considered one of the leading architects of federal farm and agricultural policy during the late 20th Century and early 21st Century.

In addition, for eight years, Stenholm was ranking Democrat on the House Agriculture Committee. He was among members who personally benefited from the subsidy program, originally authorized during the Great Depression to aid small farmers in staying on their land. Under the 1996 farm bill, from 1996 to 2002, Stenholm as a farmer received $39,000 in subsidies. At least ten of his colleagues, both Republicans and Democrats, also received substantial farm subsidies during this period.

Stenholm worked very closely with Larry Combest, the committee's chairman and a fellow farm owner, a Republican representing the neighboring Texas's 19th congressional district. They shepherded the 2002 Farm Bill through Congress, in which Texas got the largest increase in subsidies of any state, doubling the amount received. During this period, the wealthiest 10% of farmers received 74% of the subsidies, which were directed at agribusiness. The 15 states that received 74% of the subsidies paid only 24% of the cost in their taxes, thus gaining a major federal handout.

=== Electoral success and demographic changes ===
Although the 17th's voters had begun splitting their tickets and voting Republican in presidential and U. S. Senate elections from the 1970s onward, the Republican Party had little support at the local level at the time. Conservative Democrats continued to hold most local offices in the 17th's footprint well into the 1990s. Proving this, Stenholm faced no major-party opposition from 1980 to 1990. He ran unopposed in 1980 and from 1984 to 1990. Notably, he was elected unopposed in years when Republican presidential candidates carried the 17th in landslides.

In 1994, however, Stenholm was held to 53 percent of the vote by a then relatively unknown Republican candidate, Phil Boone. When his children heard the initial returns, they were so certain that he'd lost that they traveled to the family farm to console him. That same election saw Republicans win dozens of offices at the local level. Afterward, Stenholm ran for House Minority Whip, losing to David E. Bonior. While he was reelected four more times after that, Stenholm never won more than 60 percent of the vote, and he was nearly defeated in 1996 and 2002. During this time, Republicans gradually whittled away the Democratic advantage at the local level. By the end of the 20th century, Stenholm was the only Democrat elected above the county level in much of the 17th district. The district had swung so heavily to the GOP downballot by then that many observers thought it likely that Stenholm would be succeeded by a Republican once he retired.

== Reelection defeat ==
Stenholm was considered a major target of the Republican-dominated House in the redrawing of Texas's congressional districts in 2003, following the 2000 census. The Texas Legislature, now controlled by Republicans, significantly redrew the state's congressional map after U.S. House of Representatives Majority leader Tom DeLay of the Houston-based 22nd district pushed for a new map. Stenholm's district was dismantled and split among four districts. Most of his former territory, including his home in Abilene, was thrown into the heavily Republican Lubbock-based 19th congressional district, represented by Combest's successor, Republican Randy Neugebauer. The next-biggest chunk of Stenholm's former territory, including his cotton farm, was assigned to the equally Republican Amarillo-based 13th district, represented by Mac Thornberry.

Stenholm chose to run in the reconfigured 19th. The new district contained 60 percent of Neugebauer's former territory, a disadvantage which Stenholm could not overcome, despite his 13 terms of seniority. He lost by 18 percentage points in the November 2004 election, gaining slightly more than 40 percent of the vote. To date, Stenholm is the only substantive Democratic candidate to run in the 19th since Combest claimed the 19th for the GOP in 1984, and the only Democrat since then to garner even 40 percent of the vote in the district.

== Post-Congressional life ==
Some major news organizations mentioned Stenholm as a possible candidate for Secretary of Agriculture in President George W. Bush's second-term Cabinet, although Bush had supported the congressional redistricting plan. Bush nominated Nebraska Governor Mike Johanns, a fellow Republican, for the post.

After leaving Congress, Stenholm became a lobbyist, representing various agricultural interests, including the horse meat industry. In 2006, he was the most visible lobbyist for three foreign-owned horse-slaughter plants in the U.S., which were fighting regulatory legislation that would have resulted in their having to close. Meat from such horses was consumed as food by residents of some European Union countries, Japan, and Mexico; it was also used for zoo food and medical purposes.

From 2005, Stenholm was a senior policy advisor and lobbyist with Olsson Frank Weeda, a Washington law and lobbying firm that specializes in representing food, drug, and agriculture interests before federal agencies.

Stenholm was a member of the ReFormers Caucus of Issue One. He also served on the board of directors of the Committee for a Responsible Federal Budget.

Stenholm later returned to Tarleton State University where he taught Agriculture Policy.

== Death ==
Stenholm died at his home in Granbury, Texas, on May 17, 2023, at the age of 84. Upon his death, many notable political leaders offered public tribute to Stenholm, including former Secretary of Agriculture Dan Glickman and the top leaders on the U.S. House and Senate committees on Agriculture.

U.S. House of Representatives
| Preceded by Omar Burleson | Member of the U.S. House of Representatives from Texas's 17th congressional district 1979–2005 | Succeeded by Chet Edwards |
| Preceded by Kika de la Garza | Ranking Member of the House Agriculture Committee; 1997–2005 | Succeeded by Collin Peterson |
Party political offices
| New office | Chair of the Conservative Democratic Forum; 1981–1995 | Position abolished |
| Preceded by Collin Peterson | Chair of the Blue Dog Coalition for Policy; 1999–2001; Served alongside: Robert E. Cramer (Administration), Chris John (Communications) | Succeeded by Allen Boyd |
| Preceded by Allen Boyd | Chair of the Blue Dog Coalition for Policy; 2003–2005; Served alongside: Jim Turner (Administration), Baron Hill (Communications) | Succeeded by Jim Cooper |
