= Uniparty =

Political science term

Uniparty is a political term referring to the idea that seemingly separate mainstream political parties in a liberal democracy, most notably the two dominant parties in a first-past-the-post system, as well as major governing parties in multiparty systems, function in practice as a single entity. While frequently applied to the Republican Party and the Democratic Party in the United States, or the Conservative Party and the Labour Party in the United Kingdom, the term and equivalent concepts are also used across other Western nations, including Australia and Germany, to criticize perceived consensus among established parties.

The concept implies that despite their outward disagreements, the parties collaborate behind closed doors and share a unified set of political and economic interests, effectively creating a de facto one-party state. Proponents of this idea argue that such a "uniparty" suppresses genuine political alternatives and dissenting viewpoints by exercising disproportionate control over the media, grassroots organisations, and ballot access regulations.

== Use by country ==
=== United States ===
"Uniparty" dates back to a 1944 scandal wherein a letter (which turned out to be a forgery) was claimed to show that Franklin D. Roosevelt had selected Wendell Willkie to be his opponent in the 1940 election. Supporters of the 2000 Green Party presidential bid of Ralph Nader used the term extensively, and Nader himself called the prevailing political structure a "corporate uniparty" in his 2002 book Crashing the Party.

Afterwards, the term was largely dormant, being sporadically used by third parties until it was adopted by Steve Bannon in describing how in his view the Republican "establishment" was working with the Democrats to suppress Donald Trump's campaign seeking the 2016 Republican nomination. The term saw resurgence in 2024 with claims by figures including Marjorie Taylor Greene and Robert F. Kennedy Jr. that the two-party system operates as a uniparty. When Elon Musk announced he would create his own third party, the America Party, on 5 July 2025, he stated that he was doing so because the Republicans and Democrats had become a "Uniparty".

=== United Kingdom ===
Proponents of the theory in Britain on right and left have claimed that the Conservative Party, Labour Party, and Liberal Democrats are indistinguishable from each other. More broadly, it has been increasingly used in the wake of centrist political developments such as New Labour under Tony Blair and One Nation during the tenure of David Cameron. These ideas became especially prominent during the Labour leadership of Jeremy Corbyn, Brexit, and the rise of Reform UK under Nigel Farage.

=== Australia ===
The term became prominent in Australia following the rise of One Nation, a right-wing populist political party, which frequently applies the term to the Australian Labor Party and the Liberal–National Coalition.

The term has also been used by progressive media organisation Michael West Media after the Labor Party and Liberal/National Coalition combined to support political donation changes seen as favouring the two major parties.

=== Germany ===
In German politics, criticisms resembling the uniparty concept are frequently directed at the established mainstream parties, notably the Christian Democratic Union (CDU), its sister party the Christian Social Union (CSU) and the Social Democratic Party (SPD). Critics argue that these parties form an entrenched political establishment with diminishing ideological differences, particularly following repeated grand coalitions between the CDU/CSU and SPD at the federal level.

Right-wing populist movements, most prominently the Alternative for Germany (AfD), regularly use the derogatory label Altparteien ("old parties") or Einheitspartei ("unity party") to characterize the mainstream parties as an undifferentiated political cartel. Critics contend that consensus-driven coalition politics and informal cordon sanitaire agreements, known in Germany as the Brandmauer ("firewall"), exclude anti-establishment parties from government and limit genuine policy alternatives on issues such as immigration, European integration, and energy policy.

== See also ==
- Boll weevil (politics)
- Cartel party theory
- Controlled opposition
- Dominant-party system
- Duopoly § Politics
- Duverger's law
- The Establishment
- Grand coalition
- One-party state
- Republicrat
- Rockefeller Republican
- Southern Democrats
- Two-party system
