= Olsson Frank Weeda Terman Matz PC =

American law firm and lobbying firm

- Headquarters: Washington, D.C.
- No. of offices: 1
- No. of attorneys: Over 30
- Major practice areas: Government law related to food, drug, medical device, and agriculture industries
- Key people: Philip C. Olsson; (Co-founder and Senior Principal); Richard L. Frank; (Co-founder and Senior Principal)
- Date founded: 1979
- Company type: Professional corporation
- Website: ofwlaw.com

Olsson Frank Weeda Terman Matz PC is an American boutique law firm and lobbying firm based in Washington, D.C., that specializes in representing business interests in the food, drug, medical device, and agriculture industries in their dealings with the Food and Drug Administration and the United States Department of Agriculture. The firm was founded in 1979 as Olsson and Frank PC, but has long been best known as Olsson Frank Weeda or, more recently, OFW Law.

== History ==
Co-founder Philip Olsson was deputy assistant secretary at USDA for marketing and consumer services from 1971 to 1973. Co-founder Richard L. Frank was a Washington lawyer. The third long-time principal, David F. Weeda, died in 2001.

The addition of three named partners in 2007, one of whom left the firm in 2011, included Marshall Matz. He joined the firm in the early 1990s after having served as General Counsel for the U.S. Senate Select Committee on Nutrition and Human Needs, whose chair was Senator George McGovern (D-South Dakota). During the 2000s McGovern himself served as a Senior Policy Advisor with the firm, specializing in issues of food, nutrition, and agriculture, until his death in October 2012. Other former political figures that served as a senior policy advisors and lobbyists with the firm included at some time or another the former U.S. Secretary of Agriculture John R. Block and the former longtime US Representative Charles W. Stenholm (D-Texas) .

As lobbyists, the firm worked for a variety of corporations in its areas of expertise, as well as for a few non-profit and human rights organizations. By 2009, it was earning $2.4 million from its lobbying activities.

The former legal affairs director of the Center for Science in the Public Interest consumer advocacy group joined the firm in 2010. By 2011, Olsson Frank Weeda was considered by some to be the nation's top law firm in dealing with issues of agriculture. The New York Times has stated that "OFW Law ... is known for its bipartisan roster of lobbyists and its long list of food-industry clients, some with competing interests on legislative or regulatory matters."

In 2013, the Child Nutrition Act came up for Congressional reauthorization again and, in the wake of the Healthy, Hunger-Free Kids Act of 2010, there was a political battle over school lunch standards. The firm got into a dispute with the School Nutrition Association (SNA), the school food lobby, which was seeking to loosen the standards. The SNA dismissed Matz as its legal representative and instead hired Barnes & Thornburg for that role. This caused some dissension within the ranks of the SNA and a protest from the Congressional Hunger Center, which said that OFW Law was "the A-team" in child nutrition and urged the retention of Matz.

In 2014, the SNA filed a legal ethics complaint with the District of Columbia Bar against OFW Law, alleging that the firm had improper contacts with the United States Department of Agriculture and had conflicts of interest. The complaint was dismissed by the Bar in 2015.
