= Democrat in name only =

Pejorative term for some Democratic politicians

In U.S. politics, "Democrat in name only" ("DINO") is a pejorative term used to describe politicians of the Democratic Party to indicate that their governing or legislating style is more like a member of the Republican Party.

The terms Blue Dog Democrat and Yellow dog Democrat have been more popular than DINO for describing heterodox Democrats, particularly conservative Democrats.

== History ==
=== Usage ===
In his 1920 run for one of Georgia's seats in the United States Senate, Thomas E. Watson was denounced by the Valdosta Times newspaper as a "Democrat in name only." When William DeWitt Mitchell was appointed United States Attorney General in 1928 by President Herbert Hoover, the Chicago Tribune described Mitchell as a "Democrat in name only," arguing that "his record of the last few years has been Republican." In 1936 United States Senator Edward R. Burke of Nebraska resigned his position as a member of the Democratic National Committee stating that he could not support "any candidate masquerading as a Democrat but who was a Democrat in name only," referring to Terry Carpenter, a Representative from Nebraska then running for the Senate.

The term was used by left-leaning bloggers in 2005 to refer to Connecticut Senator Joe Lieberman, who they saw as being too conservative on foreign policy and an apologist for the Bush administration. In 2010, the term was also used in reference to Nebraska Senator Ben Nelson after voting not to confirm Elena Kagan to the Supreme Court.

In October 2021, Richard Luscombe writing in The Guardian applied the term to two Democratic Senators, Joe Manchin of West Virginia and Kyrsten Sinema of Arizona, when they opposed passing President Joe Biden's Build Back Better Act.

More recently, senator John Fetterman of Pennsylvania has been accused of being a Democrat in name only in the US Congress. The title has also been applied to Rob Sand, Jared Golden, and Alani Bankhead.

== See also ==
- Boll Weevil Democrats
- Conservative Democrat
- Left-right politics
- Libertarian Democrat
- New Democrats
- Party switching in the US
- Republican in name only
- Southern Democrats
