= Republican in name only =

Pejorative term to describe Republican politicians

Celeste Greig's 1993 "No RINOs" button design

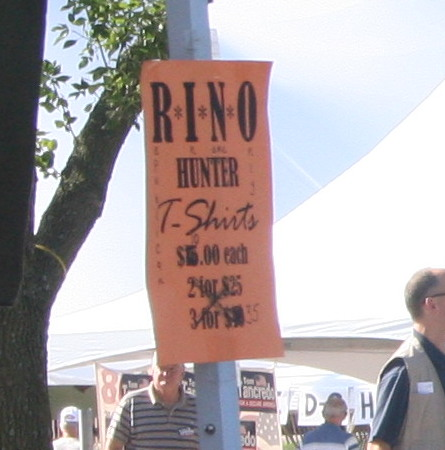
"RINO Hunter" shirts advertised for sale at the 2007 Iowa Straw Poll

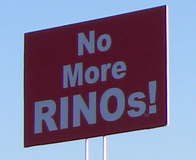
"No More RINOs!" sign at a 2010 Tea Party movement protest in Minnesota

In American politics, "Republican in name only" is a pejorative used to describe politicians of the Republican Party deemed insufficiently loyal to the party, or misaligned with the party's ideology. Similar terms have been used since the early 1900s. The acronym RINO became popular in the 1990s, and both the acronym and the full spelling have become commonly used by President Donald Trump and his supporters to refer to his critics within the Republican Party.

== Origins ==
The phrase Republican in name only emerged as a popular political pejorative in the 1920s, 1950s, and 1980s.

The earliest known print appearance of the acronym RINO was in 1992 in the Manchester, New Hampshire, newspaper then called The Union Leader. RINO is pronounced like the word "rhino", and can be used to associate disloyal Republicans with the large, thick-skinned animal.

Bill Clinton would have been proud of what was happening on the third-floor Senate corner at the State House this week. ... The Republicans were moving out and the Democrats and "RINOs" (Republicans In Name Only) were moving in.

— John DiStaso, "Merrill Taps Scamman, Strome and a Thomson". New Hampshire Union Leader. December 31, 1992.

Buttons featuring a red slash through an image of a rhinoceros were spotted in the New Hampshire State House as early as 1992. In 1993, future California Republican Assembly President Celeste Greig distributed buttons featuring a red slash over the word RINO to express opposition to Los Angeles mayor Richard Riordan. The term came into widespread usage during subsequent election cycles.

== Usage overall ==
During Republican primary campaign season, some conservative organizations target Republicans who fail to adopt their stances by referring to them as RINOs. A "RINO Hunters Club" formed by the National Federation of Republican Assemblies has taken political action against those they considered RINOs. The fiscally conservative 501(c)4 organization Club for Growth started the "RINO Watch" list to monitor "Republican office holders around the nation who have advanced egregious anti-growth, anti-freedom or anti-free market policies"; other conservative groups published similar lists.

=== Contemporary usage ===
45th and 47th President of the United States Donald Trump has used the term to criticize Republican politicians who have opposed him or his agenda. Following the 2020 presidential election in the United States, he used the term to refer to Georgia governor Brian Kemp and Georgia Secretary of State Brad Raffensperger after they declined to challenge the election results in Georgia during his attempts to overturn the 2020 United States presidential election. In the aftermath of the election, he called congressional Republicans who recognized Joe Biden as president-elect "RINOs". He called Maryland governor Larry Hogan a "RINO" in a tweet. He also used the term to describe House Republicans who voted to impeach him and Senate Republicans who voted to convict him during his second impeachment. He later used the term to describe Republicans who voted for the Bipartisan Infrastructure Bill. Some Republicans have used the term to criticize Donald Trump due to his history as a registered Democrat.

After former Secretary of State Colin Powell died in 2021, Trump described him as a "classic RINO". After former Vice President Dick Cheney endorsed Democrat Kamala Harris in the 2024 presidential election, Trump referred him as an "irrelevant RINO".

After Tom Emmer failed to get the nomination to Speaker of the House, Trump called him a RINO before the press and on Truth Social. Four hours after the failed vote, Emmer withdrew the nomination and lost. Trump later claimed that Texas governor Greg Abbott was a RINO following Abbott's failed 2026 re-election bid.

== Similar terms ==
The concept of being an inauthentic member of the Republican Party by not representing its more conservative faction is a recurring theme in party history.

=== Me-too Republicans ===
In the 1930s and 1940s, the term Me-too Republicans described those running on a platform of agreeing with the Democratic Party, proclaiming only minor or moderating philosophical differences. An example is two-time presidential candidate Thomas E. Dewey, who ran against the popular Franklin D. Roosevelt and his successor Harry Truman. Dewey did not oppose Roosevelt's New Deal programs altogether, but merely campaigned on the promise that Republicans would run them more efficiently and less corruptly.

Let me warn the nation, against the smooth evasion which says, "of course we believe all these things, we believe in social-security, we believe in work for the unemployed, we believe in saving homes — cross our hearts and hope to die, we believe in all these things. But we do not like the way the president's administration is doing them. Just turn them over to us. We will do all of them, we will do more of them, we will do them better, and best of all, the doing of them will not cost anybody anything."

— President and Democrat Franklin D. Roosevelt, addressing a Democratic audience in New York, September 1936

From 1936 to 1976, the more centrist members of the Republican Party frequently won the national nomination with candidates such as Alf Landon, Wendell Willkie, Thomas E. Dewey, Dwight D. Eisenhower, and Gerald Ford. The mainstream of the Republican Party was generally supportive of the New Deal. In the 1950s, conservatives such as Robert A. Taft and Barry Goldwater, who rallied against "me-too Republicans", were considered outside of the mainstream; serious consideration was given to leaving the then GOP and forming a new ultra-conservative party in coalition with the "states' rights" Democrats of the South.

=== Nixonians and Rockefeller Republicans ===
In the 1960s and 1970s, Republicans considered liberal on economic issues but hawkish on foreign policy and social issues were sometimes called "Nixonian", or "Rockefeller Republicans".

=== Gypsy moth Republican ===
In the 1980s, the term gypsy moth Republican described Republicans from the Northeast and Midwest who voted against the Ronald Reagan administration's proposed cuts in aid to economically distressed people, contrasting with boll weevil Democrats, who voted for these cuts. The gypsy moth is an invasive species destructive to trees in the Northeastern United States.

=== Cuckservative ===
In 2015 the term cuckservative, a portmanteau of cuckold and conservative, was popularized on the online forum 4chan, and embraced by both internet trolls and the nativist alt-right. The metaphorical "cuck" is represented in a genre of pornography as a masochistic husband who allows his wife to have sex with a stronger man, thereby participating in his own symbolic emasculation. In white supremacist vernacular, the term is an accusation of yielding to non-white interests on issues such as immigration or modern display of the Confederate flag; however, the term gained use (with some controversy) by more mainstream conservatives to denounce Republicans whose compromises included vote trading, rhetorical restraint in deference to donors, cooperation with Democrats on any particular initiative, or attempting to court voters by making appeals to supposedly liberal ideals.

== See also ==
- Country club Republican
- Democrat in name only
- Libertarian Republican
- Progressive conservatism
- Liberal conservatism
