= Alyse Galvin =

American politician from Alaska (born 1965)

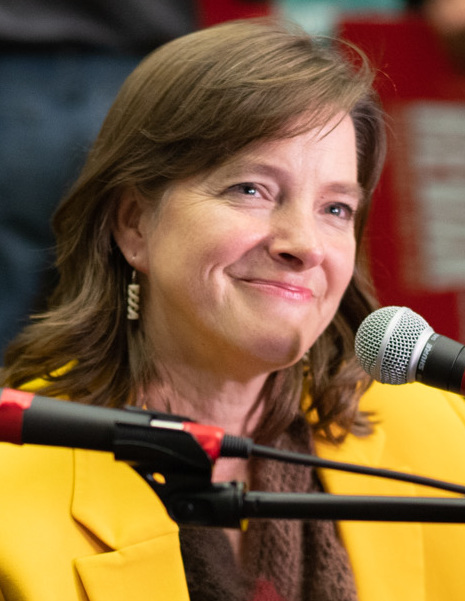
- Galvin in August 2018

Member of the Alaska House of Representatives from the 14th district
- Incumbent
- Assumed office January 17, 2023
- Preceded by: Kelly Merrick

Personal details
- Born: July 18, 1965 (age 61) Riverside, California, U.S.
- Party: Democratic (before 2022); Independent (2022–present)
- Education: University of California, San Diego (BA)
- Website: Campaign website

Alyse Surratt Galvin (born July 18, 1965) is an American businesswoman, education advocate, and politician from the state of Alaska. She was an independent candidate for the U.S. House of Representatives in Alaska's at-large congressional district in 2018 and 2020, running as a Democrat. She lost both times to incumbent Republican Don Young. She represents the 14th district in the Alaska House of Representatives.

== Background ==
Galvin was born in Riverside, California and grew up in Alaska. She graduated from The Bishop's School in La Jolla, a neighborhood in San Diego and earned a Bachelor of Arts degree in political science from the University of California, San Diego.

== Career ==
Galvin worked as a manager at the Anchorage Sheraton hotel. She is an education advocate and was a part of Bill Walker's transition team in 2014 after his election as governor of Alaska. She co-founded Great Alaska Schools which is an advocacy group for education funding.

=== Congressional elections ===
On January 11, 2018, Galvin announced her candidacy for Alaska's at-large congressional district in the 2018 United States House of Representatives election in Alaska as an independent. Alaska held their primaries on August 27, 2018. Galvin opted to run in the Democratic primary, receiving 54.1% of the vote, beating out three other contenders. The 2018 general election was held on November 6, 2018. Galvin faced incumbent Republican Don Young. On election day Galvin won 46.7% of the vote, losing to Young.

Galvin announced that she was running again in the 2020 United States House of Representatives election in Alaska. She said that Alaska was "ground zero for the climate crisis" and supports investment in renewable energy and energy efficiency. She opposed the Pebble Mine. However, she agreed with Young on other resource issues including oil drilling in the Arctic.

=== Alaska House of Representatives ===
In late 2021, Galvin announced a run for the Alaska Legislature, although initially she did not specify whether she would run for a seat in the Alaska House of Representatives or the Alaska Senate, due to complications with redistricting. She chose to run for Alaska's 14th House of Representatives district against Republican candidate Nicholas Danger.

== Personal life ==
Galvin and Pat, an oil executive who served as the revenue commissioner for Governor Sarah Palin are married. They have two sons and two daughters.

== Electoral history ==
=== 2018 ===
2018 United States House of Representatives Democratic–Libertarian–Independence primary election in Alaska
Party	Candidate	Votes	%
Independent	Alyse Galvin	19,735	54.1%
Democratic	Dimitri Shein	8,432	23.1%
Democratic	Carol Hafner	5,394	14.8%
Independent	Christopher Cumings	2,926	8.0%
Total votes		40,551	100.0%

2018 United States House of Representatives election in Alaska
Party	Candidate	Votes	%
Republican	Don Young (Incumbent)	149,779	53.3%
Independent	Alyse Galvin	131,199	46.7%
Write-in		1,188	0.42%
Total votes		282,166	100.0%
Republican hold			

=== 2020 ===
2020 United States House of Representatives Democratic–Libertarian–Independence primary election in Alaska
Party	Candidate	Votes	%
Independent	Alyse Galvin	53,258	85.83%
Democratic	Ray Tugatuk	4,858	7.83%
Democratic	Bill Hibler	3,931	6.34%
Total votes		62,047	100.0%

2020 United States House of Representatives election in Alaska
Party	Candidate	Votes	%
Republican	Don Young (Incumbent)	192,126	54.40%
Independent	Alyse Galvin	159,856	45.26%
Write-in		1,183	0.34%
Total votes		353,165	100.0%
Republican hold			

=== 2022 ===
2022 Alaska's 14th House of Representatives district primary election
Party	Candidate	Votes	%
Independent	Alyse Galvin	2,760	67.51%
Republican	Nicholas Danger	1,328	32.49%
Total votes		4,088	100.0%

2022 Alaska's 14th House of Representatives district general election
Party	Candidate	Votes	%
Independent	Alyse Galvin	3,796	66.94%
Republican	Nicholas Danger	1,847	32.57%
Write-in	Write-ins	28	0.49%
Total votes		5,671	100%

=== 2024 ===
==== Primary ====
2024 Nonpartisan primary
Party	Candidate	Votes	%
Independent	Alyse Galvin (incumbent)	1,622	83.7
Democratic	Harry Kamdem	315	16.3
Total votes		1,937	100.0

==== General ====
2024 Alaska House of Representatives election, District 14
Party	Candidate	Votes	%
Independent	Alyse Galvin (incumbent)	4,847	77.5
Democratic	Harry Kamdem	1,278	20.4
Write-in		128	2.1
Total votes		6,253	100.0
Independent hold			
