= 2018 United States House of Representatives election in Alaska =

- November 6, 2018
- Turnout: 49.34%
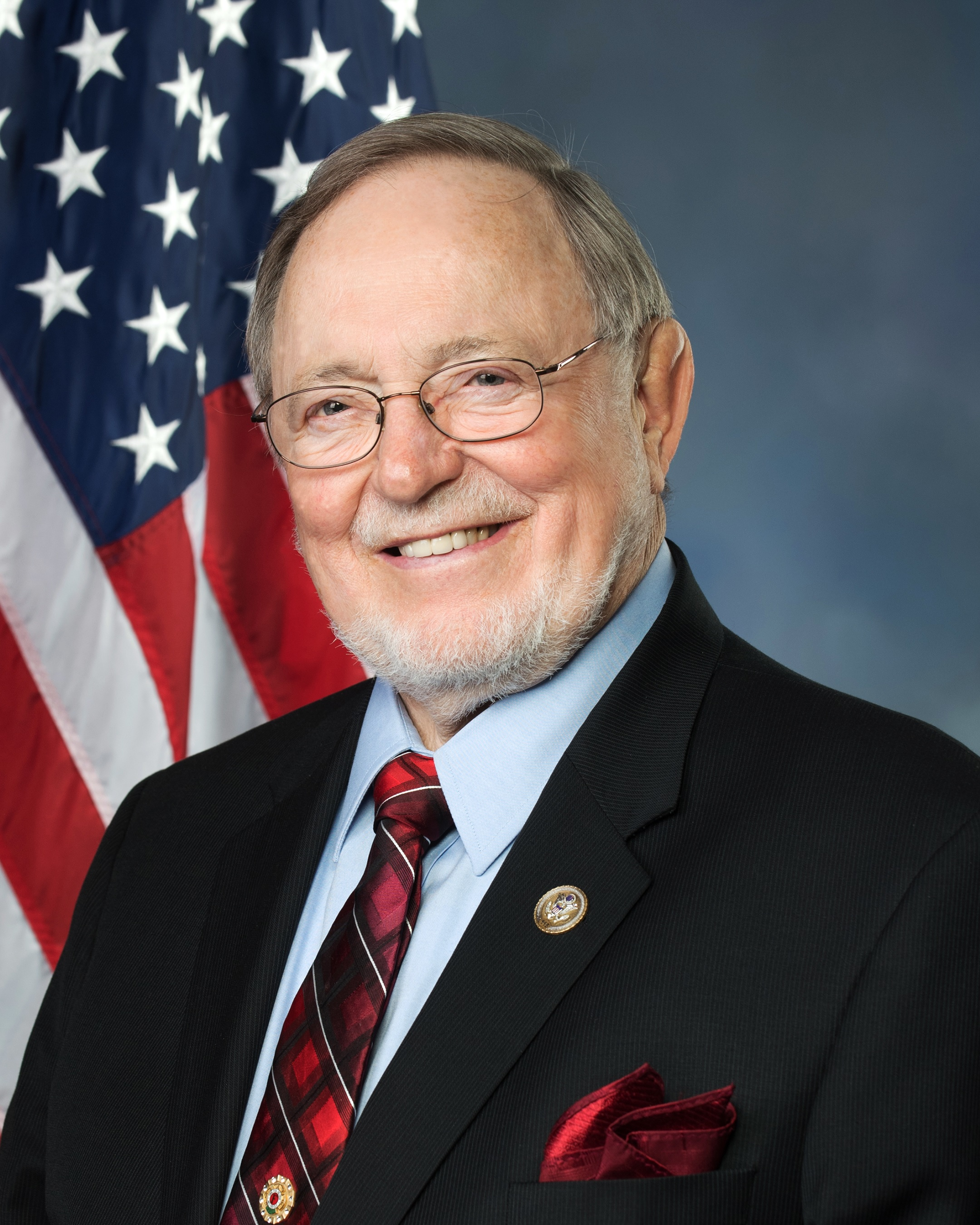

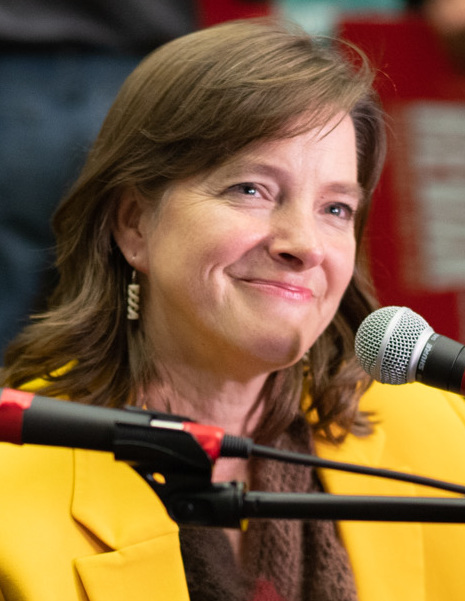
Nominee	Don Young	Alyse Galvin
Party	Republican	Independent
Alliance		Democratic
Popular vote	149,779	131,199
Percentage	53.08%	46.50%
- Young: 50–60% 60–70% 70–80% 80–90% Galvin: 50–60% 60–70% 70–80% 80–90% >90%
U.S. Representative before election
Don Young
Republican
Elected U.S. Representative
Don Young
Republican

The 2018 United States House of Representatives election in Alaska were held on November 6, 2018, to elect the U.S. representative from Alaska's at-large congressional district, who would represent the state of Alaska in the 116th United States Congress. The election coincided with other elections to the House of Representatives, as well as elections to the United States Senate and various state and local elections.

== Republican primary ==
=== Candidates ===
==== Declared ====
- Thomas "John" Nelson, businessman
- Jed Whittaker, candidate for U.S. Senate in 1996 and perennial candidate
- Don Young, incumbent U.S. representative and Dean of the House of Representatives

=== Results ===
Republican primary results by state house district Map legend: Young—70–80%; Young—60–70%; Young—50–60%

2018 Alaska Republican primary results
Party	Candidate	Votes	%
Republican	Don Young (incumbent)	49,667	70.85%
Republican	Thomas "John" Nelson	10,913	15.57%
Republican	Jed Whittaker	9,525	13.59%
Total votes		70,105	100%

== Democratic–Libertarian–Independence primary ==
Candidates from the Alaska Democratic Party, Alaska Libertarian Party and Alaskan Independence Party appear on the same ballot, with the highest-placed candidate from each party receiving that party's nomination.

=== Candidates ===
==== Declared ====
- Christopher C. Cumings, running as Non-partisan (N)
- Alyse S. Galvin, running as Undeclared (U)
- Carol "Kitty" Hafner, running as Democrat (D)
- Dimitri Shein, running as Democrat (D)

=== Endorsements ===
Dimitri Shein (D)

Individuals

- Cenk Uygur, co-founder and co-host of The Young Turks

Organizations

- Our Revolution

Media

- The Young Turks

=== Results ===
Democratic–Libertarian–Independence primary results by state house district Map legend: Galvin—60–70%; Galvin—50–60%; Galvin—40–50%; Galvin—30–40%; Galvin—<30%; Shein—<30%

2018 Alaska Democratic–Libertarian–Independence primary results
Party	Candidate	Votes	%
Independent	Alyse S. Galvin	21,742	53.62%
Democratic	Dimitri Shein	9,434	23.26%
Democratic	Carol Hafner	6,071	14.97%
Independent	Christopher C. Cumings	3,304	8.15%
Total votes		40,551	100%

== General election ==
=== Predictions ===
Source	Ranking	As of
The Cook Political Report	Lean R	November 5, 2018
Inside Elections	Likely R	November 5, 2018
Sabato's Crystal Ball	Lean R	November 5, 2018
RealClearPolitics	Tossup	November 5, 2018
Daily Kos	Lean R	November 5, 2018
FiveThirtyEight	Lean R	November 6, 2018

=== Endorsements ===
Alyse Galvin (I)

Local and statewide politicians

- Eric Croft, member of the Anchorage Assembly

Labor unions

- National Education Association-Alaska

Organizations

- The Alaska Center
- End Citizens United

=== Polling ===
View source data.

Poll source	Date(s) administered	Sample size	Margin of error	Don Young (R)	Alyse Galvin (I)	Undecided
Alaska Survey Research	October 26–29, 2018	500	–	48%	49%	3%
Lake Research Partners (I-Galvin)	October 13–16, 2018	500	–	48%	44%	8%
Alaska Survey Research	October 12–14, 2018	500	± 4.4%	49%	47%	4%
Public Policy Polling (D)	October 11–12, 2018	645	–	46%	43%	10%
Alaska Survey Research	October 1–6, 2018	500	± 4.4%	50%	46%	4%
Alaska Survey Research	September 21–25, 2018	500	± 4.4%	53%	43%	4%
Lake Research Partners (I-Galvin)	June 7–12, 2018	540	± 4.2%	40%	36%	24%

=== Results ===
2018 Alaska's at-large congressional district
Party	Candidate	Votes	%	±%
Republican	Don Young (incumbent)	149,779	53.08%	+2.76%
Independent	Alyse S. Galvin (Note: Also listed as having the Democratic nomination.)	131,199	46.50%	+10.48%
Write-in		1,188	0.42%	+0.02%
Total votes		282,166	100%	N/A
Republican hold				

==== Boroughs and census areas that flipped from Republican to Democratic ====
- Prince of Wales-Hyder Census Area (largest town: Craig)
- Petersburg Borough (largest town: Petersburg)
- Yakutat Borough
- Anchorage (largest town: Anchorage)
- Yukon–Koyukuk Census Area (largest town: Fort Yukon)
- Nome Census Area (largest town: Nome)
- Kusilvak Census Area (largest town: Hooper Bay)
- Bethel Census Area (largest town: Bethel)
- Dillingham Census Area (largest town: Dillingham)
- Aleutians West Census Area (largest town: Unalaska)
