= Conservative Democrat =

US Democratic Party member with conservative political views

In American politics, a conservative Democrat is a member of the Democratic Party with more conservative views than most Democrats. Traditionally, conservative Democrats have been elected to office from the Southern states, rural areas, the Rust Belt, and the Great Plains. In 2019, the Pew Research Center found that 14% of Democratic and Democratic-leaning registered voters identify as conservative or very conservative, 38% identify as moderate, and 47% identify as liberal or very liberal.

Between 1865 and 1964, the Democratic Party and Republican Party each had influential liberal, moderate, and conservative wings. During this period, conservative Democrats formed the Democratic half of the conservative coalition. After 1964, the Democratic Party retained its conservative wing through the 1970s with the help of urban machine politics. The numerical decline of conservative Democrats is attributed to the Southern strategy, which realigned conservative white voters in the South to the Republican Party following the Civil Rights Act of 1964 and the Voting Rights Act of 1965. In the 21st century, the number of conservative Democrats decreased substantially. Over this period from, 1960s to 2010s, after the Southern strategy, the party generally moved rightward on economic policy, embracing neoliberalism under the New Democrats, deregulation (including the repeal of Glass–Steagall), welfare reform, and fiscal austerity, abandoning New Deal era liberalism, while generally moving leftward on social and cultural issues such as LGBTQ+ rights, racial justice, and reproductive rights. (Note: Attributed to multiple references:)

The Blue Dog Coalition represents centrist and conservative Democrats in the U.S. House of Representatives. In the 2020s, the Blue Dog Coalition has shrunken significantly due to electoral losses in conservative districts and primary challenges from more liberal opponents.

== History ==
=== 1876–1964: Solid South ===
The Solid South describes the reliable electoral support of the U.S. Southern states for Democratic Party candidates for almost a century after the Reconstruction era. Except for 1928, when Catholic candidate Al Smith ran on the Democratic ticket, Democrats won heavily in the South in every presidential election from 1876 until 1964 (and even in 1928, the divided South provided most of Smith's electoral votes). Democratic Party domination was bolstered by restrictions preventing blacks from voting and built on white supremacist Southerners' animosity towards the Republican Party's role in the Civil War and Reconstruction.

=== 1874–1928: Rise of agrarian populism ===
In 1896, William Jennings Bryan won the Democratic Party nomination by promoting silver over gold, and denouncing the banking system. He had a strong base in the South and Plains states, as well as silver mining centers in the Rocky Mountain states. He was weak in urban areas and immigrant communities which opposed prohibition. He also won the Populist nomination. Conservative Democrats opposed Bryan, especially in the Northeast where "Gold Democrats" were most active. "Gold Democrats" were supporters of the gold standard, as well as Grover Cleveland, a revered figure of conservative Democrats. They formed the National Democratic Party and nominated John Palmer, former Governor of Illinois, for President and Simon Bolivar Buckner, former Governor of Kentucky, for Vice President. They also nominated a few other candidates, including William Campbell Preston Breckinridge for the House of Representatives, but they won no elections. Bryan and people he supported (especially Woodrow Wilson) usually dominated the party. However, the conservative Democrats did nominate the Democratic Party’s presidential candidate in 1904, Alton B. Parker.

=== 1932–1948: Franklin D. Roosevelt and the New Deal coalition ===
The 1932 presidential election brought about a major realignment in political party affiliation. Franklin D. Roosevelt forged a coalition of labor unions, liberals, Catholics, African Americans, and Southern whites. Roosevelt's program for alleviating the Great Depression, collectively known as the New Deal, emphasized only economic issues, and thus was compatible with the views of those who supported the New Deal programs but were otherwise conservative. This included the Southern Democrats, who were an important part of FDR's New Deal coalition. A number of chairmanships were also held by conservative Democrats during the New Deal years.

Conservative Democrats came to oppose the New Deal, especially after 1936. They included Senator Harry F. Byrd and his powerful state organization in Virginia, Senator Rush Holt Sr., Senator Josiah Bailey, and Representative Samuel B. Pettengill. The American Liberty League was formed in 1934, to oppose the New Deal. It was made up of wealthy businessmen and conservative Democrats including former Congressman Jouett Shouse of Kansas, former Congressman from West Virginia and 1924 Democratic presidential candidate, John W. Davis, and former governor of New York and 1928 Democratic presidential candidate Al Smith. In 1936, former U.S. Assistant Secretary of War Henry Skillman Breckinridge ran against Roosevelt for the Democratic nomination for president. John Nance Garner, of Texas, 32nd Vice President of the United States under Roosevelt, a conservative Southerner, broke with Roosevelt in 1937 and ran against him for the Democratic nomination for president in 1940, but lost. By 1938, conservative Democrats in Congress—chiefly from the South—formed a coalition with Republicans that largely blocked liberal domestic policy until the 1960s.

However, most of the conservative Southern Democrats supported the foreign policy of Roosevelt and Truman.

Roosevelt tried to purge the more conservative Democrats in numerous states in 1938. He especially tried to unseat those up for reelection who defeated his plan to pack the Supreme Court in 1937. He failed in nearly all cases, except for a major success in defeating John J. O'Connor in Manhattan, a spokesman for big business.

A different source of conservative Democratic dissent against the New Deal came from a group of journalists who considered themselves classical liberals and Democrats of the old school, and were opposed to big government programs on principle; these included Albert Jay Nock and John T. Flynn, whose views later became influential in the libertarian movement.

=== 1948–1968: Segregationist backlash ===
The proclamation by President Harry S. Truman and Minneapolis Mayor Hubert Humphrey of support for a civil rights plank in the Democratic Party platform of 1948 led to a walkout of 35 delegates from Mississippi and Alabama. These Southern delegations formed their own States Rights Democratic Party, better known as the Dixiecrats, nominees with South Carolina Governor Strom Thurmond leading the ticket (Thurmond would later represent South Carolina in the U.S. Senate, and join the Republicans in 1964). The Dixiecrats held their convention in Birmingham, Alabama, where they nominated Thurmond for President and Fielding L. Wright, Governor of Mississippi, for Vice President. Dixiecrat leaders worked to have Thurmond-Wright declared the "official" Democratic Party ticket in Southern states. They succeeded in Alabama, Louisiana, Mississippi, and South Carolina; in other states, they were forced to run as a third-party ticket. Preston Parks, elected as a presidential elector for Truman in Tennessee, instead voted for the Thurmond-Wright ticket. Leander Perez attempted to keep the States Rights Party alive in Louisiana after 1948, but was unsuccessful.

Similar breakaway Southern Democratic candidates running on states' rights and segregationist platforms would continue in 1956 (T. Coleman Andrews), and 1960 (Harry F. Byrd). None would be as successful as the American Independent Party campaign of George Wallace, the Democratic governor of Alabama, in 1968. Wallace had briefly run in the Democratic primaries of 1964 against Lyndon Johnson, but dropped out of the race early. In 1968, he formed the new American Independent Party and received 13.5% of the popular vote, and 46 electoral votes, carrying several Southern states. The AIP would run presidential candidates in several other elections, including Southern Democrats Lester Maddox in 1976 and John Rarick in 1980, but none of them did nearly as well as Wallace.

=== 1970–1999 ===
After 1968, with desegregation a settled issue, conservative Democrats, mostly Southerners, managed to remain in the United States Congress throughout the 1970s and 1980s. These included Democratic House members as conservative as Larry McDonald, who was also a leader in the John Birch Society. During the administration of Ronald Reagan, the term "boll weevils" was applied to this bloc of conservative Democrats, who consistently voted in favor of the tax cuts, increases in military spending, and deregulation favored by the Reagan administration, but were opposed to cuts in social welfare spending.

Boll weevils was sometimes used as a political epithet by Democratic Party leaders, implying that the boll weevils were unreliable on key votes or not team players. Most of the boll weevils either retired from office or (like Senators Phil Gramm and Richard Shelby) switched parties and joined the Republicans. Since 1988, the term boll weevils has fallen out of popular use.

Split-ticket voting was common among conservative Southern Democrats in the 1970s and 1980s. These voters supported conservative Democrats for local and statewide office, while simultaneously voting for Republican presidential candidates. For example, Kent Hance defeated future president George W. Bush in the 1978 midterms. They were sometimes humorously called "Yellow Dog Democrats", "boll weevils", or "Dixiecrats". According to journalist Ed Kilgore, Yellow Dog Democrats were Southerners who saw the Democratic Party as "the default vehicle for day-to-day political life, and the dominant presence, regardless of ideology, for state and local politics."

In the House after the 1994 Republican Revolution, the Blue Dog Coalition was formed, a caucus of conservatives and centrists willing to broker compromises with the Republican leadership who acted as a unified voting bloc in the past, giving its members some ability to change legislation, depending on their numbers in Congress.

=== 2000–present ===
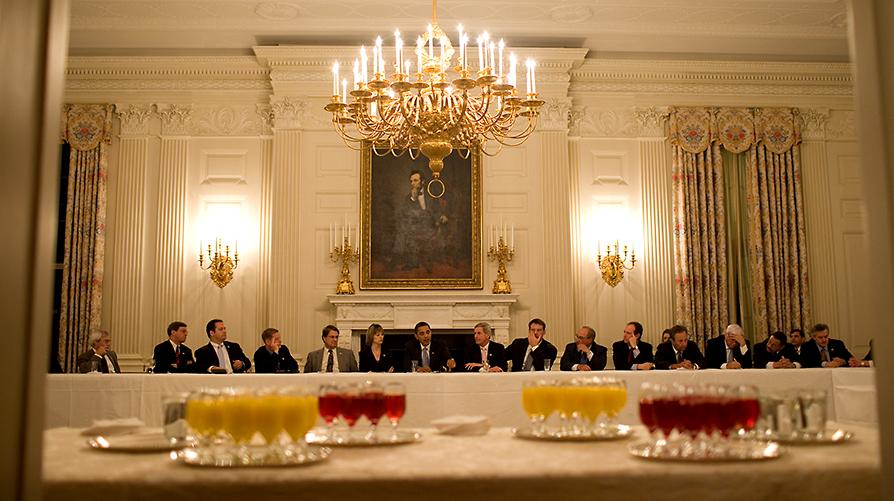
President Barack Obama meets with the Blue Dog Coalition in the State Dining Room in 2009.

During the 2006 midterm elections, the Democratic Party ran moderates and even a few conservative Democrats for at-risk Republican seats. The Blue Dog Democrats gained nine seats during the elections. The New Democrats had support from 27 of the 40 Democratic candidates running for at-risk Republican seats.

In his 2010 campaign for reelection, Walter Minnick, U.S. Representative for Idaho's 1st congressional district, was endorsed by Tea Party Express, an extremely rare occurrence for a Democrat. Minnick was the only Democrat to receive a 100% rating from the Club for Growth, an organization that typically supports conservative Republicans. Minnick lost to Raúl Labrador, a conservative Republican, in the general election.

The Washington Post noted the waning influence of the conservative Democratic Blue Dog Coalition voting bloc, losing over half of their previously more than 50 U.S. House members in the 2010 midterms. In the 2018 House of Representatives elections, the Democratic Party nominated moderate to conservative candidates in many contested districts and won a majority in the chamber. In the aftermath of the elections, the Blue Dog Coalition expanded to 27 members.

During the 117th Congress with the Senate evenly split 50-50, U.S. Senator Joe Manchin of West Virginia as the most conservative member of the Senate Democratic Caucus, wielded enormous influence in that time. Manchin refused to abolish the Senate filibuster for non-budget reconciliation-related legislation, but did vote to confirm Ketanji Brown Jackson to the Supreme Court and pass the Inflation Reduction Act. During the 2022 midterms, Democrats narrowly lost their House majority, though they gained a seat in the Senate. The Blue Dog Coalition was reduced to eight members, the lowest number in its history. During the 118th Congress, Manchin was again considered a key swing vote in the Senate, alongside Kyrsten Sinema.

In 2023, Manchin announced he would not seek re-election in 2024. Manchin left the Democratic Party and registered as an independent on May 31, 2024.

By 2026, some conservatives opposing the MAGA movement and Trumpism likewise defected to become Democrats, such as George Conway and Olivia Troye.

== Blue Dog Coalition ==
The Blue Dog Coalition was formed in 1995 during the 104th Congress to give members from the Democratic Party representing conservative-leaning districts a unified voice after Democrats' loss of Congress in the 1994 Republican Revolution. The coalition consists of centrist and conservative Democrats.

The term "Blue Dog Democrat" is credited to Texas Democratic U.S. Representative Pete Geren (who later joined the Bush administration). Geren opined that the members had been "choked blue" by Democrats on the left. It is related to the political term "Yellow Dog Democrat", a reference to Southern Democrats said to be so loyal they would even vote for a yellow dog before they would vote for any Republican. The term is also a reference to the "Blue Dog" paintings of Cajun artist George Rodrigue of Lafayette, Louisiana.

The Blue Dog Coalition "advocates for fiscal responsibility, a strong national defense and bipartisan consensus rather than conflict with Republicans". It acts as a check on legislation that its members perceive to be too far to the right or the left on the political spectrum. The Blue Dog Coalition is often involved in searching for a compromise between liberal and conservative positions. As of 2014, there was no mention of social issues in the official Blue Dog materials.

== Ideology and polls ==
Historically, the Southern Democrats that formed the Democratic half of the conservative coalition of the mid 20th century were generally much more conservative than conservative Democrats are now. After the 1994 Republican Revolution, the Republican Party won a majority of U.S. House seats in the South for the first time since Reconstruction, with the remaining conservative Democrats forming the Blue Dog Coalition.

Conservative Democrats are generally fiscally conservative, and are often also socially conservative. According to journalist Ed Kilgore, Yellow Dog Democrats were Southerners who saw the Democratic Party as "the default vehicle for day-to-day political life, and the dominant presence, regardless of ideology, for state and local politics."

In 2019, the Pew Research Center found that 14% of Democratic and Democratic-leaning registered voters identify as conservative or very conservative, 38% identify as moderate, and 47% identify as liberal or very liberal.

== List of conservative Democrats ==
=== Presidents ===
- Franklin Pierce (1853–1857)
- James Buchanan (1857–1861)
- Andrew Johnson (1865–1869)
- Grover Cleveland (1885–1889; 1893–1897)

=== Presidential nominees ===
- Samuel J. Tilden: Ran in 1876 as a Bourbon Democrat in one of the closest presidential elections in American history.
- Alton Parker
- John W. Davis
- Al Smith
- Strom Thurmond: Ran in 1948 as a Dixiecrat, a Southern pro-segregation splinter of the Democratic Party.
- George Wallace: Ran on the right-wing American Independent Party in 1968, but ran again in 1972 as a Democrat.
- John Rarick: U.S. Representative from Louisiana's 6th congressional district (1967-1975). Ran for President of the United States in 1980 on the American Independent Party.

=== Senators ===
==== Former ====
- Lloyd Bentsen: U.S. Senator from Texas from 1971 to 1993; the 69th Secretary of the Treasury from 1993 to 1994 under Bill Clinton.
- John Breaux: U.S. Senator from Louisiana from 1987 to 2005.
- Mary Landrieu: U.S. Senator from Louisiana from 1997 to 2015.
- Frank Lausche: U.S. Senator from Ohio from 1957 to 1969; supported Ronald Reagan for president in 1984.
- Blanche Lincoln: U.S. Senator from Arkansas from 1999 to 2011.
- Joe Manchin: U.S. Senator from West Virginia from 2010 to 2025; independent since 2024 but still caucused with Democrats.
- Zell Miller: U.S. Senator from Georgia from 2000 to 2005. Supported George W. Bush for president in 2004.
- Kyrsten Sinema: U.S. Senator from Arizona from 2019 to 2025; independent since 2022 but still caucused with Democrats.

=== Governors ===
- John Connally: Governor of Texas from 1963 to 1969.
- Ben Nelson: Governor of Nebraska from 1991 to 1999.
- John Bel Edwards: Governor of Louisiana from 2016 to 2024.
- Dave Freudenthal: Governor of Wyoming from 2003 to 2011.

=== Representatives ===
==== Current ====
- Sanford Bishop: United States Representative from Georgia (Since 1993)
- Jared Golden: Member from Maine's 2nd congressional district since 2019.
- Jim Costa: Member of the United States House of Representatives from California's 21st congressional district (2013–) (2005–present), member of the California Senate from the 16th district (1995–2002), and member of the California State Assembly from the 30th district (1978–1994).
- Henry Cuellar: Member of the United States House of Representatives from Texas's 28th congressional district (2005–), 102nd Texas Secretary of State (2001), and member of the Texas House of Representatives (1987–2001).
- Josh Gottheimer: Member of the United States House of Representatives from New Jersey (2017–), attorney, and writer.
- Marie Gluesenkamp Pérez: Member of the United States House of Representatives from Washington (2023–), co-chair of the Blue Dog Coalition (2023–).

==== Former ====
- Gary Condit - U.S. Congressman from California (1989-2003), Blue Dog Democrat, lone House vote against censuring fellow U.S. representative James Traficant in 2002.
- James Traficant - U.S. House of Representatives member from Ohio (1985-2002)
- E. Eugene Cox - U.S. Congressman from Georgia (1925-1952), supporter of racial segregation.
- Larry McDonald - U.S. Congressman from Georgia's 7th congressional district (1975-1983)
- Bill Lipinski - U.S. Congressman from Illinois (1983-2005), member of the Blue Dog Coalition of conservative Democrats.
- David Scott – U.S. Congressman from Georgia (2003–2026), Chair of the House Agriculture Committee (2021–2023), member of the Georgia State Senate from the 36th district (1983–2003), and member of the Georgia House of Representatives (1975–1983).
- Gene Taylor - U.S. Congressman from Mississippi (1993-2010)

== See also ==
- Asian American and Pacific Islands American conservatism in the United States
- Barnburners and Hunkers. Democrats in New York state in 1850s
- Black conservatism in the United States
- Blue Dog Coalition
- Boll weevil (politics)
- Bourbon Democrat, late 19th century
- Byrd Machine, in 20th century Virginia
- Conservative coalition
- Conservative Manifesto
- Copperheads (politics)
- Democrat in Name Only
- Democrats for Life of America
- Dixiecrat, 1948
- Factions in the Democratic Party (United States)
- Fire-Eaters
- Hispanic and Latino conservatism in the United States
- Jeffersonian democracy
- LaRouche movement
- LGBTQ conservatism in the United States
- Libertarian Democrat
- National Democratic Party (United States)
- New Democrats
- Pork Chop Gang, in 20c Florida
- Reagan Democrat
- Redeemers
- Red Shirts (United States), violent opposition to Reconstruction
- Regular Democratic Organization
- Rockefeller Republican
- Southern Democrats
- Southern Manifesto
- Straight-Out Democratic Party
- Texas Regulars
- Women in conservatism in the United States
- Yellow dog Democrat
