= Yellow dog Democrat =

United States political term

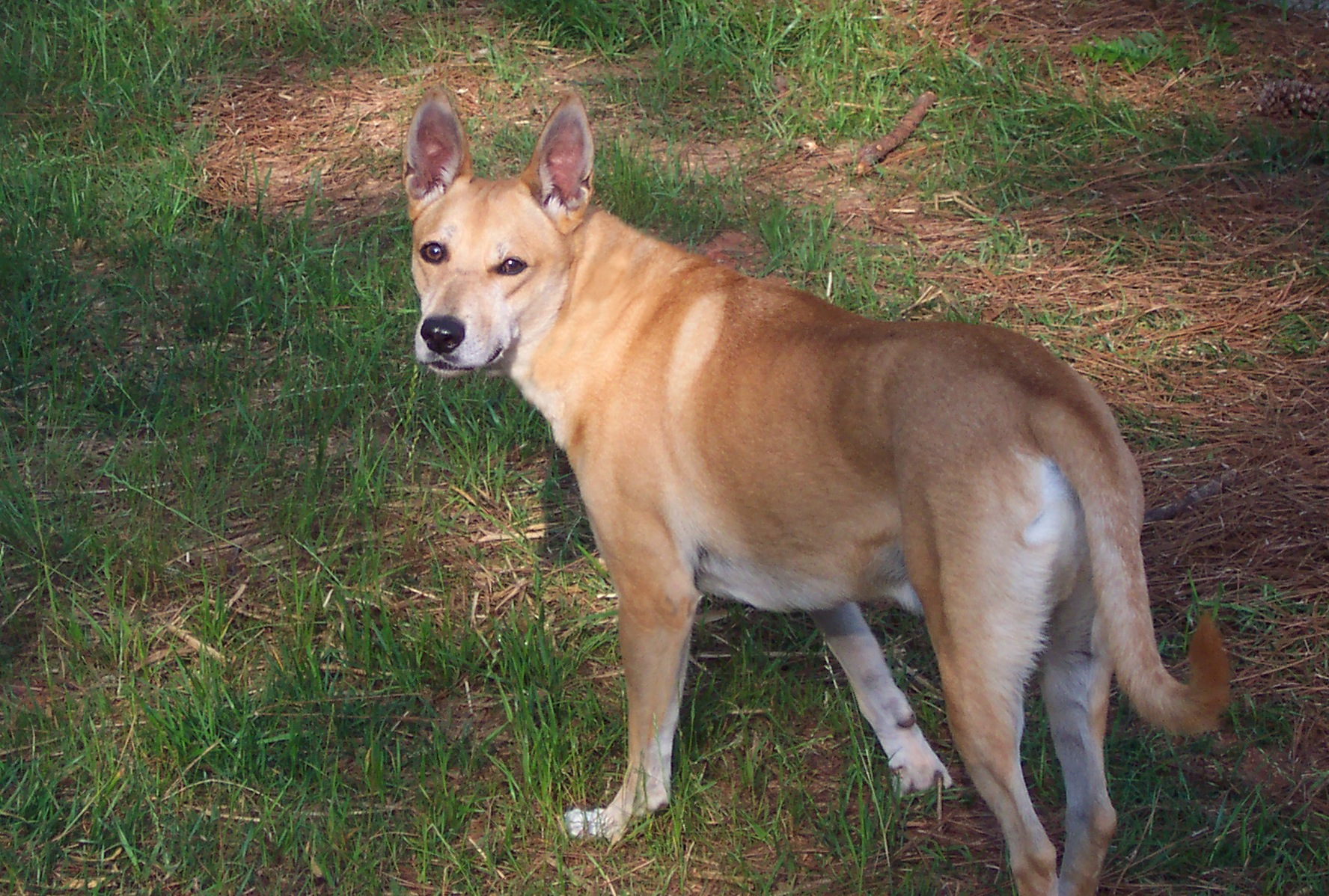
The Carolina Dog's wildness and its ginger coat led to its being called a "yaller dog", which in turn may have led to the expression "yellow dog Democrat".

Yellow dog Democrats is a political term that was applied to voters in the Southern United States who voted solely for candidates who represented the Democratic Party. The term originated in the late 19th century. These voters would allegedly "vote for a yellow dog before they would vote for any Republican", or, "vote for a yellow dog if he ran on the Democratic ticket". The term is now more generally applied to refer to any Democrat who will vote a straight party ticket under any circumstances. The South Carolina Democratic Party and Mississippi Democratic Party, among other state parties, continue to use the phrase to refer to committed members of the Democratic Party in the "Yellow Dog Club".

According to journalist Ed Kilgore, Yellow Dog Democrats were Southerners who saw the Democratic Party as "the default vehicle for day-to-day political life, and the dominant presence, regardless of ideology, for state and local politics."

The term "yellow dog" may be a reference to the Carolina Dog, a dog breed without European heritage and indigenous to the Americas (specifically the Southern United States).

== History and usage ==
The phrase "Yellow Dog Democrat" is thought to have first achieved popularity during the 1928 presidential race between Democratic candidate Al Smith and Republican candidate Herbert Hoover, when Senator J. Thomas Heflin (D-Alabama) crossed party lines and formally supported Hoover. Many Southern voters disliked several items on Smith's platform, as well as his Roman Catholic faith, but still voted for him.

However, the term did not originate from the election of 1928, and there were earlier recorded usages. It was used by Abraham Lincoln in an 1848 speech on the presidential campaign of General Zachary Taylor, whose Democratic opponent was General Lewis Cass. Lincoln derided Cass as one of several recent Democratic presidential candidates in the mold of Andrew Jackson by saying:

A fellow once advertised that he had made a discovery by which he could make a new man out of an old one, and have enough of the stuff left to make a little yellow dog. Just such a discovery has Gen. Jackson's popularity been to you [Democrats]. You not only twice made President of him out of it, but you have had enough of the stuff left to make presidents of several comparatively small men since; and it is your chief reliance now to make still another.

In the run-up to the 1892 presidential election, African-American journalist C. H. J. Taylor of Kansas City, Kansas, in his paper The American Citizen, used the term to refer to Republicans in the West who, he wrote, "would vote for a yellow dog out there if he was named Republican." In 1893, the Kansas City Journal, a Republican newspaper, criticized "This thing of voting for 'yaller dogs', and expecting them to turn black-and-tan after the election," with reference to Missouri voters always voting for Democrats, then being surprised at their allegedly invariable corruption.

In the 1899 contest for governor in Kentucky, Theodore Hallam was criticized at a Democratic Party meeting for first supporting William Goebel, then campaigning against him. The critic pointed out that Hallam earlier had said "if the Democrats of Kentucky, in convention assembled, nominated a yaller dog for governor you would vote for him" and asked "why do you now repudiate the nominee of that convention, the Honorable William Goebel?" Hallam responded:

"I admit," he stated blandly, "that I said then what I now repeat, namely, that when the Democratic Party of Kentucky, in convention assembled, sees fit in its wisdom to nominate a yaller dog for the governorship of this great state, I will support him— but lower than that ye shall not drag me!"

There are indications that the term was in widespread and easily understandable use by 1923. In a letter written in Huntland, Tennessee, by W. L. Moore of Kansas City, Missouri, on May 9, 1923, on the occasion of his 90th birthday, Moore writes:

I am a Democrat from inheritance, from prejudice and principle, if the principle suits me. But I have passed the yaller dog degree.

== See also ==
- Blue Dog Coalition, a caucus of United States Congressional Representatives of the Democratic Party who identify as moderates or fiscal conservatives
- Boll weevil, a segregationist Southern Democrat (used in the mid- and late-20th century)
- Coattail effect – tendency for a popular political party leader to attract votes for other candidates of the same party
- Congressional Progressive Caucus
- Conservative Democrat
- Factions in the Democratic Party
- Solid South
- Straight-ticket voting
