= Boll weevil (politics) =

American political terminology

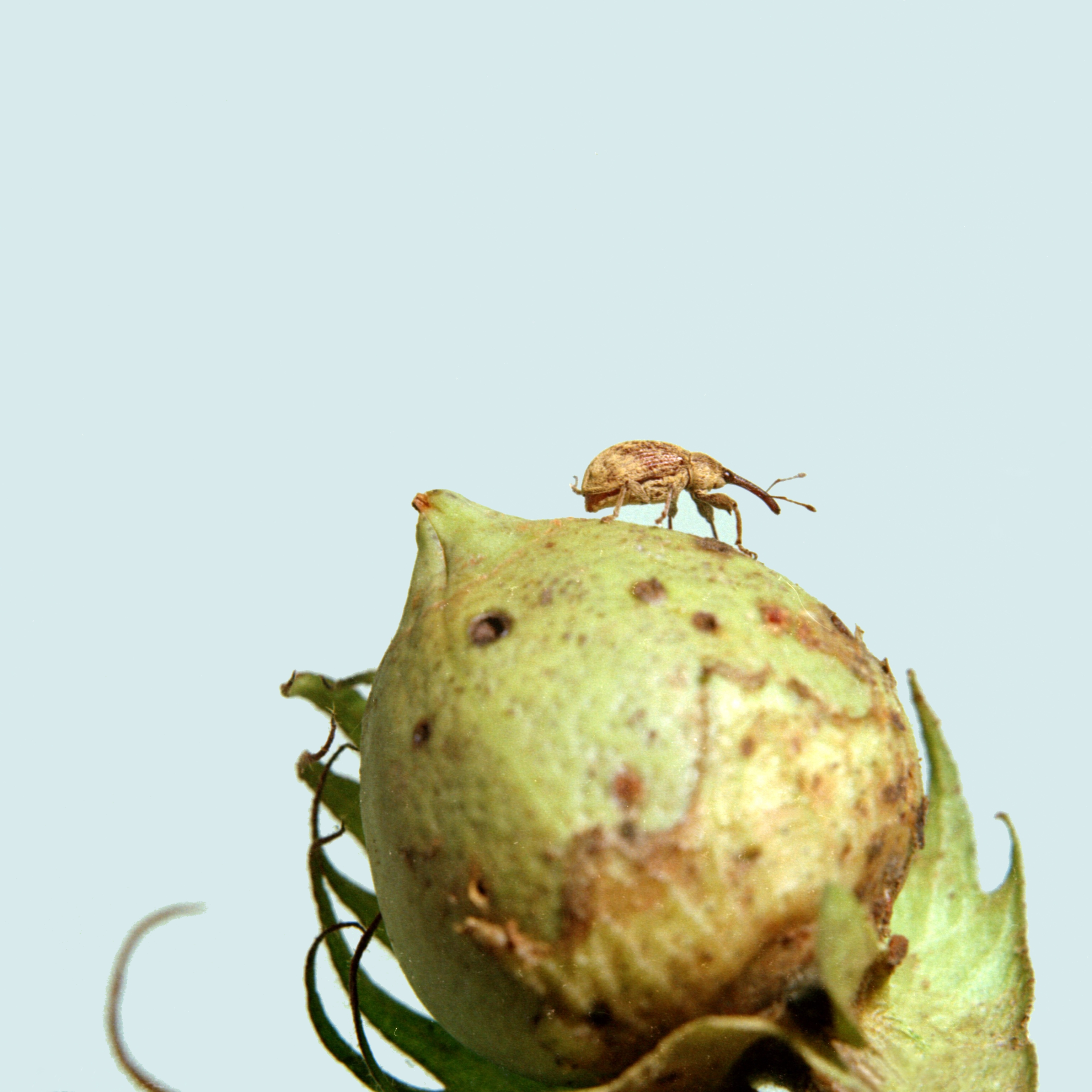
A boll weevil beetle on a cotton boll

Boll weevil (named for the type of beetle which feeds on cotton buds) was an American political term used in the mid-to-late 20th century to refer to groupings of conservative Democrats, particularly Southern Democrats who sided with Republican policy priorities.

They represented a persistent, disruptive force that undermined Democratic leadership and this pejorative label characterized this bloc as pests that destroyed a healthy organism "from within".

== Background ==
During and after the administration of Franklin D. Roosevelt, conservative Southern Democrats were part of the coalition generally in support of the economic policies of Democratic presidents Roosevelt and Harry S. Truman, dubbed the New Deal and Fair Deal respectively, but were opposed to desegregation and the civil rights movement.

On several occasions between 1948 and 1968, prominent conservative Southern Democrats broke from the Democrats to run a third party campaign for president on a platform of states' rights: Strom Thurmond in 1948, Harry F. Byrd in 1960, and George Wallace in 1968 . In the 1964 presidential election, five states in the Deep South (then a Democratic stronghold) voted for Republican challenger Barry Goldwater over Southern Democrat Lyndon B. Johnson, partly due to Johnson's support of the Civil Rights Act of 1964 and Goldwater's opposition to it.

After 1968, with desegregation a settled issue, the Republican Party began a strategy of trying to win conservative Southerners from the Democratic Party to the Republican Party (see Southern strategy and silent majority).

== History ==
Representative Howard W. Smith of Virginia took up the boll weevil as a symbol in the 1950s, during Dwight D. Eisenhower's administration, but the term did not gain currency until the 1980s, when it was revived by Representative Charles W. Stenholm of Texas. The group adopted the name of the boll weevil, a pest destructive to cotton crops, because of the difficulty of eradicating the weevil and the pest's range in the Southern United States.

Nonetheless, a bloc of conservative Democrats, mostly Southerners, remained in the United States Congress throughout the 1970s and 1980s. These included Democratic House members as conservative as Georgia's Larry McDonald, who was also a leader in the John Birch Society. A caucus chaired by Charlie Stenholm was formed in 1981, until being succeeded by the Blue Dog Coalition.

During the administration of Ronald Reagan, the term "boll weevils" was applied to this bloc of conservative Democrats, who consistently voted for Reagan administration policies, such as tax cuts, increases in military spending, and deregulation. The boll weevils were contrasted with the "gypsy moth Republicans"—moderate Republicans from the Northeast and Midwest who opposed many of Reagan's economic policies.

Most of the Democratic boll weevils eventually retired from politics, or in the case of some, such as Senators Phil Gramm of Texas and Richard Shelby of Alabama, switched parties and joined the Republicans. Since 1988, the term "boll weevils" has fallen out of favor.

A bloc of conservative Democrats in the House, including some younger or newer members as well as the remaining boll weevils who refused to bow to pressure to switch parties, organized themselves as the "Blue Dogs" in the early 1990s. A different bloc of Democrats also emerged in the 1990s, under the Democratic Leadership Council (DLC), espousing pro-business views on economic issues and moderate views on social issues.

== See also ==
- Bourbon Democrat
- Democrat in Name Only
- Dixiecrat
- New Democrats
- Republican in Name Only
- Yellow dog Democrat

== Bibliography ==
- Black, Earl; Black, Merle (1992). The Vital South: How Presidents Are Elected. Harvard University Press. ISBN 0674941306.
