= Blue Dog Coalition =

Moderate/conservative caucus of the Democratic Party

- Co-Chairs: Marie Gluesenkamp Perez (WA–3); Vicente Gonzalez (TX–34); Lou Correa (CA–46)
- Founded: February 14, 1995; 31 years ago
- Ideology: Conservatism; Fiscal conservatism
- Political position: Center to center-right
- National affiliation: Democratic Party
- Colors: Blue
- Seats in the House Democratic Caucus: 10 / 214
- Seats in the House: 10 / 435

Website
- bluedogs-gluesenkampperez.house.gov bluedogdems.com

The Blue Dog Coalition (Note: Also referred to as the Blue Dog Caucus, and commonly known as the Blue Dogs.) is a caucus of moderate and conservative members from the Democratic Party in the United States House of Representatives. The caucus was founded as a group of conservative Democrats in 1995 in response to defeats in the 1994 elections. At its peak in 2009, the Blue Dog Coalition numbered 54 members, accounting for 21% of the entire Democratic caucus. As of 2026, it has 10 members.

In the late 2010s and early 2020s, the coalition became more focused on ideological centrism and constituency-based politics, but maintained an emphasis on fiscal responsibility. It remains the most conservative grouping of Democrats in the House.

Following a period of decline, the Blue Dogs had a resurgence in the 2026 elections and more than doubled their member count. The victories of moderate or conservative Democrats in traditionally red states helped propel Democrats to gain control of both houses of Congress.

== Name ==
The term blue dog Democrat is credited to Texas representative Pete Geren, a Democrat who later joined the George W. Bush administration. Geren opined that the members had been "choked blue" by "extreme" Democrats on the left. It is related to the political term yellow dog Democrat, a reference to Southern Democrats said to be "so loyal they would even vote for a yellow dog before they would vote for any Republican". The term also refers to the "Blue Dog" paintings of Cajun artist George Rodrigue of Lafayette, Louisiana, as the original members of the coalition would regularly meet in the offices of Louisiana representatives Billy Tauzin and Jimmy Hayes, both of whom later joined the Republican Party – both also had Rodrigue's paintings on their walls. An additional explanation for the term cited by members is "when dogs are not let into the house, they stay outside in the cold and turn blue", a reference to the Blue Dogs' belief they had been left out of a party that they believed had shifted to the political left. At one time, first-term Blue Dogs were nicknamed "Blue Pups".

== History ==
=== 1990s ===
The Blue Dog Coalition was formed in 1995 during the 104th Congress to give members from the Democratic Party representing conservative-leaning districts a unified voice after the Democrats' loss of Congress in the 1994 Republican Revolution.

=== 2000s ===
Starting in the twenty-first century, members of the caucus began adopting more socially liberal stances in order to align more closely with mainstream Democratic Party political values.

Many Blue Dogs voted for George W. Bush's tax cuts. In 2007, 15 Blue Dogs in safe seats rebelled, and refused to contribute party dues to the Democratic Congressional Campaign Committee. An additional 16 Blue Dogs did not pay any money to the DCCC, but were exempt from party-mandated contributions because they were top GOP targets for defeat in 2008. One reason for the party-dues boycott was contained in remarks made by Rep. Lynn Woolsey of California, encouraging leaders of anti-war groups to field primary challenges to any Democrat who did not vote to end the war in Iraq. Woolsey later stated that she was misunderstood, but the Blue Dogs continued the boycott. Donations to party congressional committees are an important source of funding for the party committees, permitting millions of dollars to be funneled back into close races.

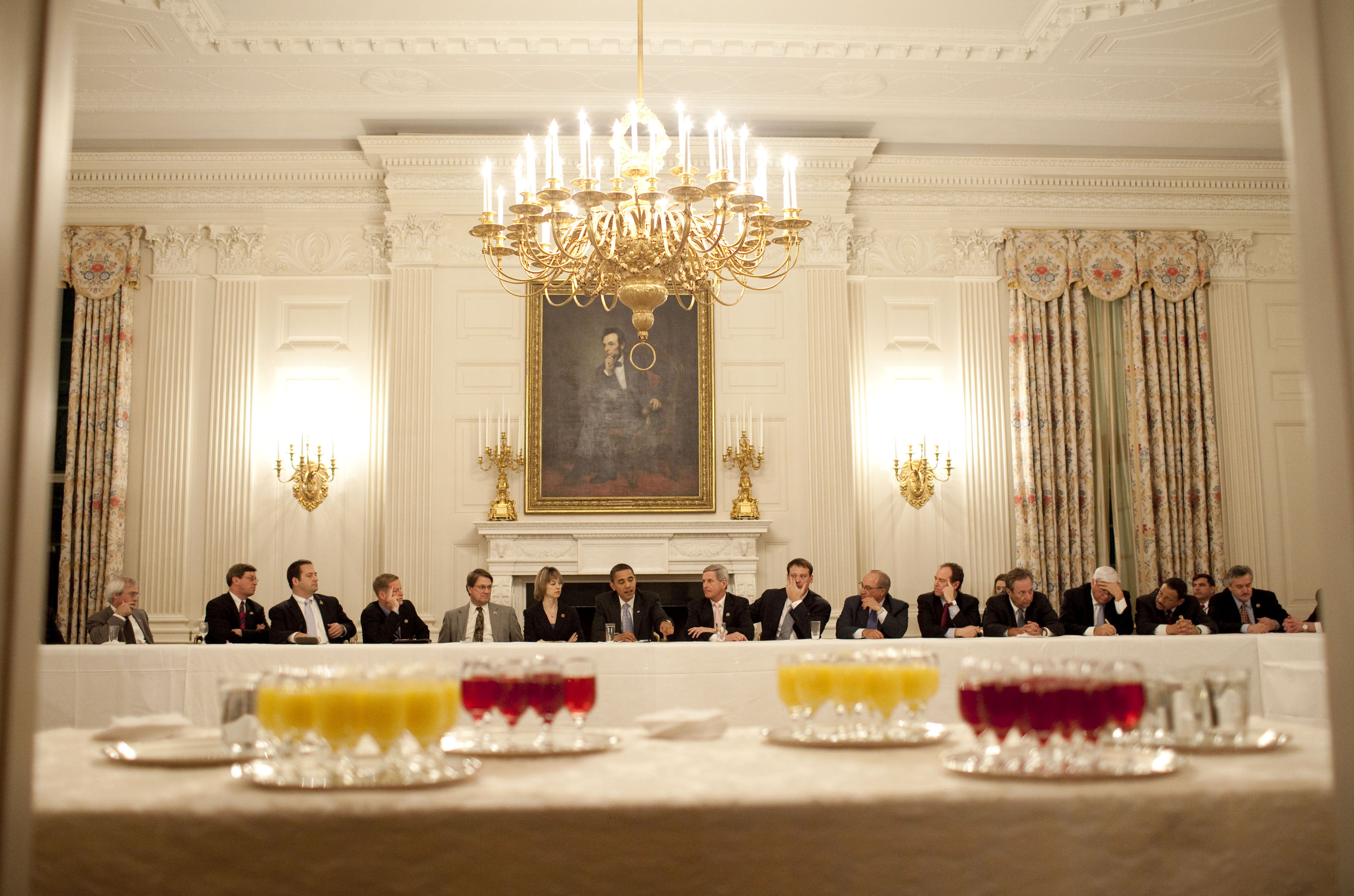
President Barack Obama meets with Blue Dog Democrats on February 10, 2009.

In the summer of 2009, The Economist said the following regarding the Blue Dog Coalition: "The debate over health care ... may be the pinnacle of the group's power so far." The Economist quoted Charlie Stenholm, a founding Blue Dog, as stating that "This is the first year for the new kennel in which their votes are really going to make a difference". In July 2009, Blue Dog members, who were committee members of the House Energy and Commerce Committee, successfully delayed the House vote on the Health Insurance Reform Bill (HR3200) until after the summer recess. It was during this recess that the term 'Obamacare' was first derisively adopted by Republicans on Capitol Hill. Blue Dog opposition to a potential "public option" within Obamacare, together with the contentious town hall meetings faced by House members during the 2009 summer recess, gave the healthcare bill's Republican opponents the opportunity to further escalate their attacks on Obamacare. The Blue Dog's refusal to include the pre-recess bill's public option, subsequently forced that central feature to be dropped from ACA's final text. On Nov. 7, 2009, the U.S. House of Representatives passed the Affordable Health Care for America Act 220 - 215 - a bill that would "provide health coverage to almost every American.” While, a majority of the Blue Dogs actually voted for that final healthcare bill, by a 28 to 24 margin, they did so with that central public option removed from the ACA's final passage.

The Washington Post stated that the Blue Dogs, with over 50 members, were the most influential voting bloc in the U.S. House of Representatives in 2010.

=== 2010s decline ===
The Blue Dog Coalition suffered serious losses in the 2010 midterm elections, losing over half of its seats to Republican challengers. Its members, who were roughly one quarter of the Democratic Party's caucus in the 111th Congress, accounted for half of the party's midterm election losses. Including retirements, Blue Dog numbers in the House were reduced from 54 members in 2009 to 26 members in 2011. Two of the coalition's four leaders (Stephanie Herseth Sandlin and Baron Hill) failed to secure re-election.

The caucus shrank even more in the 2012 House of Representatives elections, decreasing in size from 27 to 14 members. Speculation ensued that the centrist New Democrat Coalition would fill the power vacuum created by the Blue Dog Coalition's decline. Opposition to the Patient Protection and Affordable Care Act and climate change legislation are believed to have contributed to the defeat of two conservative Democrats in the 2012 House elections in Pennsylvania by more liberal opponents.

In the 2016 elections, future Blue Dogs accounted for over half of the Democrats' gains in the House. In 2018, for the first time since 2006, the Democratic Congressional Campaign Committee partnered with the Blue Dog PAC (the Blue Dog Coalition's political organization) to recruit candidates in competitive districts across the country. After the 2018 House of Representatives elections, the caucus grew from 18 members to 24. All incumbents were re-elected and Rep. Kyrsten Sinema was elected to the U.S. Senate from Arizona. The caucus also added 11 new members who defeated Republican incumbents in the 2018 election in districts that had voted for Donald Trump in 2016.

=== 2020s ===
The Democratic Party lost seats in the 2020 and 2022 House of Representatives elections, including the Blue Dog Coalition. During the 118th Congress, the coalition had 10 members.

At the start of the 118th Congress in January 2023, six of the 15 members of the Coalition departed following a failed attempt to rename the group to the "Common Sense Coalition". Freshman representative Don Davis, who was expected to join the Blue Dogs, also chose not to do so. After this split, the group reorganized and began an effort to stabilize, rebuild, and maintain influence on policy proposals in the closely divided 118th Congress. The effort included a recruitment drive which prompted Mary Peltola (AK-AL), Marie Gluesenkamp Perez (WA-03), and Wiley Nickel (NC-13) to join, bringing the number of members back up to 10. Under the leadership of Peltola, Perez, and Representative Jared Golden, the caucus shifted its focus towards ideological centrism and pragmatic, constituency-based (especially rural and working-class) politics.

== Political positions ==
The Blue Dog Coalition is centrist to center-right and ideologically conservative, with fiscally conservative economic policies. The group has never taken an official position on social issues as a caucus.

The Blue Dog Coalition is the most conservative grouping of Democrats in the House. It "advocates for fiscal responsibility, a strong national defense and bipartisan consensus rather than conflict with Republicans". It opposes legislation that its members perceive to be too far to the right or to the left on the political spectrum. In the 2010s, the Blue Dogs became more demographically diverse and less conservative.

The Blue Dog Coalition is often involved in searching for a compromise between liberal and conservative positions, including classically liberal policies. Most of its members represent competitive swing districts, and are thus inclined to appeal to swing voters.

== Leadership ==
The co-chairs of the Blue Dog Coalition for the 119th Congress are U.S. representatives Lou Correa, Vicente Gonzalez, and Marie Gluesenkamp Perez.

Start	End	Chair for Administration	Chair for Communications	Chair for Policy
February 14, 1995	April 11, 1995	Gary Condit (CA)	John Tanner (TN)	Nathan Deal (GA)
April 11, 1995	January 3, 1999	Gary Condit (CA)	John Tanner (TN)	Collin Peterson (MN)
January 3, 1999	January 3, 2001	Bud Cramer (AL)	Chris John (LA)	Charlie Stenholm (TX)
January 3, 2001	January 3, 2003	Chris John (LA)	Jim Turner (TX)	Allen Boyd (FL)
January 3, 2003	January 3, 2005	Jim Turner (TX)	Baron Hill (IN)	Charlie Stenholm (TX)
January 3, 2005	January 3, 2007	Jim Matheson (UT)	Dennis Cardoza (CA)	Jim Cooper (TN)
January 3, 2007	January 3, 2009	Allen Boyd (FL)	Mike Ross (AR)	Dennis Moore (KS)
January 3, 2009	October 7, 2009	Stephanie Herseth (SD)	Charlie Melancon (LA)	Baron Hill (IN)
October 7, 2009	January 3, 2011	Stephanie Herseth (SD)	Jim Matheson (UT)	Baron Hill (IN)
January 3, 2011	January 3, 2013	Heath Shuler (NC)	Mike Ross (AR)	John Barrow (GA)
January 3, 2013	January 3, 2015	John Barrow (GA)	Kurt Schrader (OR)	Jim Cooper (TN)
January 3, 2015	January 3, 2017	Kurt Schrader (OR)	Jim Costa (CA)	Jim Cooper (TN)
January 3, 2017	January 3, 2019	Jim Costa (CA)	Henry Cuellar (TX)	Dan Lipinski (IL)
January 3, 2019	January 3, 2021	Stephanie Murphy (FL)	Lou Correa (CA)	Tom O'Halleran (AZ)
January 3, 2021	January 3, 2023	Stephanie Murphy (FL)	Tom O'Halleran (AZ)	Ed Case (HI)
January 3, 2023	May 24, 2023	Jared Golden (ME)		Jim Costa (CA)
May 24, 2023	January 3, 2025	Jared Golden (ME)	Marie Gluesenkamp Perez (WA)	Mary Peltola (AK)
January 3, 2025	present	Marie Gluesenkamp Perez (WA)	Vicente Gonzalez (TX)	Lou Correa (CA)

== Membership ==
Blue Dog Coalition in the 119th United States Congress

In the early years of the caucus, the Blue Dogs were viewed by some as the political successors to Southern Democratic groups such as the Boll Weevils or conservative coalition. The Boll Weevils may, in turn, be considered the descendants of the Dixiecrats and the "states' rights" Democrats of the 1940s through the 1960s, and even the Bourbon Democrats of the late 19th century.

By January 2019, McClatchy reported a transformation of the Blue Dogs from a coalition of 'southern white men' to 'a multi-regional, multicultural group.' At that time, the coalition included two African-American members, one Vietnamese-American, one Mexican-American, and only five members from Southern states.

As of April 2024, the coalition included 10 members. At that point, the coalition's membership was smaller than it had ever been since its formation. As of 2026, the coalition has ten members, six of whom are also members of the New Democrat Coalition.

=== Electoral results ===
Congress	Democratic seats	±
104th (1994)	23 / 204	Steady
105th (1996)	25 / 207	▲2
106th (1998)	31 / 211	▲6
107th (2000)	34 / 212	▲3
108th (2002)	38 / 205	▲4
109th (2004)	35 / 202	▼3
110th (2006)	50 / 233	▲15
111th (2008)	54 / 257	▲4
112th (2010)	26 / 193	▼28
113th (2012)	19 / 201	▼7
114th (2014)	15 / 188	▼4
115th (2016)	18 / 193	▲3
116th (2018)	26 / 235	▲8
117th (2020)	19 / 222	▼7
118th (2022)	10 / 213	▼9
119th (2024)	11 / 215	▲1
120th (2026)	23 / 260	▲12

=== Current members ===
State	District	CPVI	Member	Also a member of	Notes
Arizona	AZ-06	EVEN	JoAnna Mendoza	New Democrat Coalition	Representative-elect
California	CA-04	D+8	Mike Thompson		Lost re-election
California	CA-13	D+2	Adam Gray	New Democrat Coalition	
California	CA-21	D+5	Jim Costa	New Democrat Coalition; Problem Solvers Caucus	
California	CA-46	D+10	Lou Correa	New Democrat Coalition	
Colorado	CO-04	R+9	Eileen Laubacher		Representative-elect
Georgia	GA-02	D+4	Sanford Bishop		
Kentucky	KY-06	R+7	Zach Dembo	New Democrat Coalition	Representative-elect
Maine	ME-02	R+4	Jared Golden	Problem Solvers Caucus	Retiring
Michigan	MI-08	R+1	Kristen McDonald Rivet	New Democrat Coalition	
Minnesota	MN-01	R+6	Jake Johnson	New Democrat Coalition	Representative-elect
Montana	MT-01	R+5	Sam Forstag	Congressional Progressive Caucus	Representative-elect
New Jersey	NJ-02	R+5	Zack Mullock		Representative-elect
New Jersey	NJ-05	D+2	Josh Gottheimer	New Democrat Coalition; Problem Solvers Caucus	
North Carolina	NC-11	R+5	Jamie Ager	New Democrat Coalition	Representative-elect
North Carolina	NC-13	R+8	Paul Barringer		Representative-elect
Pennsylvania	PA-07	R+1	Bob Brooks	Congressional Progressive Caucus	Representative-elect
South Carolina	SC-01	R+6	Nancy Lacore	New Democrat Coalition	Representative-elect
Texas	TX-15	R+7	Bobby Pulido	New Democrat Coalition	Representative-elect
Texas	TX-28	R+3	Henry Cuellar	New Democrat Coalition; Problem Solvers Caucus	
Texas	TX-34	R+3	Vicente Gonzalez	New Democrat Coalition	
Texas	TX-35	R+4	Johnny Garcia	New Democrat Coalition	Representative-elect
Washington	WA-03	R+2	Marie Gluesenkamp Perez	Problem Solvers Caucus	
Wisconsin	WI-01	R+2	Mitchell Berman	New Democrat Coalition	Representative-elect
Wisconsin	WI-03	R+3	Rebecca Cooke	New Democrat Coalition	Representative-elect

== Affiliate organizations ==
Blue Dog PAC
- Formation: August 17, 1995; 31 years ago
- Type: Political action committee
- Registration no.: C00305318
- Headquarters: Gaithersburg, Maryland
- Key people: Mike Thompson, Treasurer
- Revenue: $1.67 million (2026)
- Disbursements: $1.52 million
- Website: bluedogdems.com

The Blue Dog Coalition supports their candidates through both Blue Dog PAC and WelcomePAC, which is a Blue Dog Coalition-aligned political action committee that actively supports incumbent moderates and candidates focused on winning in districts won by Donald Trump in the 2024 presidential election.

=== 2026 ===
During the primary campaigns for the 2026 House of Representatives elections, the Blue Dog PAC endorsed 9 primary candidates alongside all incumbents prior to August. They later endorsed 5 nominees and another primary candidate on August 11, with a further four and seven being announced on September 16 and October 14 respectively. Following the losses of 3 Blue Dog candidates in the primaries – Thien Ho (CA-06), Jasmeet Bains (CA-22), and Shannon Bird (CO-08) – the PAC has 26 non-incumbent candidates entering the November general elections as of October 18, 2026. The coalition, however, is set to lose a member, following Jared Golden's decision to not run for re-election.

Former Blue Dog representatives Ben McAdams, who represented UT-04 (2019–2021), and Melissa Bean, who represented IL-08 (2005–2011), are both running to return to Congress and are widely favoured to win in their respective districts of UT-01 and IL-08, however neither has explicitly stated that they will return to the coalition.

Notably, in 2026, Blue Dog PAC has endorsed several progressive candidates, overlapping endorsements with progressive senator Bernie Sanders among other progressive individuals and organizations. In 2026, the PAC also endorsed Bill Hill for Alaska's at-large congressional district. Hill is running as an Independent which marks the only recorded time that the Blue Dogs have jointly endorsed a non-Democratic candidate for office. Retiring coalition member Jared Golden (ME-02), did break party lines and endorsed Republican Mike Lawler (NY-17) for re-election, however it was a solo endorsement, and not backed by the rest of the group.

U.S. House prospects
Candidate	State	Office	Primary			General	
Candidate	State	Office	Date	Result	%	Result	%
Bill Hill (Note: Hill is running as an Independent)	Alaska	Alaska's at-large congressional district	August 18, 2026	2nd place (Note: Alaska holds non-partisan ranked-choice primaries, in which the top 4 candidates proceed to the general election)	32.5%	Lost	Pending
JoAnna Mendoza	Arizona	Arizona's 6th congressional district	July 21, 2026	Won	uncontested	Won (flip)	Pending
Thien Ho	California	California's 6th congressional district	June 2, 2026	Lost	10.7%	Did not qualify	N/A
Jasmeet Bains	California	California's 22nd congressional district	June 2, 2026	Lost	26.9%	Did not qualify	N/A
Dwayne Romero	Colorado	Colorado's 3rd congressional district	June 30, 2026	Won	54.8%	Lost	Pending
Eileen Laubacher	Colorado	Colorado's 4th congressional district	June 30, 2026	Won	uncontested	Won (flip)	Pending
Shannon Bird	Colorado	Colorado's 8th congressional district	June 30, 2026	Lost	32.5%	Did not qualify	N/A
Amanda Green	Florida	Florida's 2nd congressional district	August 18, 2026	Won	33.5%	Lost	Pending
Bale Dalton	Florida	Florida's 7th congressional district	August 18, 2026	Won	45.5%	Lost	Pending
Leela Gray	Florida	Florida's 13th congressional district	August 18, 2026	Won	65%	Lost	Pending
Don Coover	Kansas	Kansas's 2nd congressional district	August 4, 2026	Won	uncontested	Lost	Pending
Zach Dembo	Kentucky	Kentucky's 6th congressional district	May 19, 2026	Won	39.6%	Won (flip)	Pending
Jake Johnson	Minnesota	Minnesota's 1st congressional district	August 11, 2026	Won	81.7%	Won (flip)	Pending
Sam Forstag	Montana	Montana's 1st congressional district	June 2, 2026	Won	37.3%	Won (flip)	Pending
Blake Gendebien	(New York (state)) New York	New York's 21st congressional district	June 23, 2026	Won	64.7%	Lost	Pending
Zack Mullock	New Jersey	New Jersey's 2nd congressional district	June 2, 2026	Won	39.8%	Won (flip)	Pending
Jamie Ager	North Carolina	North Carolina's 11th congressional district	March 3, 2026	Won	64.7%	Won (flip)	Pending
Paul Barringer	North Carolina	North Carolina's 13th congressional district	March 3, 2026	Won	59.1%	Won (flip)	Pending
Bob Brooks	Pennsylvania	Pennsylvania's 7th congressional district	May 19, 2026	Won	41.0%	Won (flip)	Pending
Nancy Lacore	South Carolina	South Carolina's 1st congressional district	June 23, 2026	Won	52.1%	Won (flip)	Pending
Chaz Molder	Tennessee	Tennessee's 5th congressional district	August 6, 2026	Won	40.5%	Lost	Pending
Bobby Pulido	Texas	Texas's 15th congressional district	March 3, 2026	Won	67.5%	Won (flip)	Pending
Johnny Garcia	Texas	Texas's 35th congressional district	May 26, 2026	Won	63.8%	Won (new seat)	Pending
Mitchell Berman	Wisconsin	Wisconsin's 1st congressional district	August 11, 2026	Won	44.1%	Won (flip)	Pending
Rebecca Cooke	Wisconsin	Wisconsin's 3rd congressional district	August 11, 2026	Won	60.5%	Won (flip)	Pending

== See also ==
- Congressional Progressive Caucus
- Factions in the Democratic Party
- New Democrat Coalition
- Blue Labour
- Republican Main Street Partnership
- Republican Governance Group
- Problem Solvers Caucus
- Yellow Dog Democrat
