= Disintegration =

Disintegration or disintegrate may refer to:

== Music ==
=== Albums ===
- Disintegration (The Cure album), 1989
- Disintegration, by I've Sound, 2002
- Disintegrate (Zyklon album) or the title song, 2006

=== Songs ===
- "Disintegration" (The Cure song), 1989
- "Disintegrate", by The Amenta from Flesh Is Heir, 2013
- "Disintegrate", by Def Leppard from Euphoria, 1999
- "Disintegrate", by Faster Pussycat from The Power and the Glory Hole, 2006
- "Disintegrate", by Gravity Kills from Perversion, 1998
- "Disintegrate", by Suede from Antidepressants, 2025
- "Disintegrate", by Sylosis from Cycle of Suffering, 2020
- "Disintegration", by Edge of Sanity from Crimson II, 2003
- "Disintegration", by Henry Rollins from Nights Behind the Tree Line, 2004
- "Disintegration", by Jimmy Eat World from Stay on My Side Tonight, 2005
- "Disintegration", by Monarchy featuring Dita Von Teese, 2013
- "Disintegration", by Theatre of Tragedy from Storm, 2006
- "Disintegrator", by DJ Swamp, 1998

== Science and mathematics ==
- Disintegration theorem, a mathematical result in measure theory and probability theory
- Nuclear disintegration, or nuclear decay, the result of radioactive decay

== Other ==
- The Disintegration (film), a 2011 drama film
- Disintegration (video game), a 2020 first-person shooter
- Disintegration ray, or raygun, a fictitious weapon
- Disintegration, a 1990 film; see List of the 100 best films in the history of Ukrainian cinema
- Disintegration, a 2018 short film directed by Buğra Mert Alkayalar

== See also ==
- Ablation
- Collapse (disambiguation)
- Decay chain, in nuclear science
- Derivative, in mathematics
- Integration (disambiguation)
