= Great Collapse =

Great Collapse or variation, may refer to:

- The Great Collapse, a 2017 album by 'Fit for an Autopsy'
- The Great Collapse, a 2004 album by 'Fear My Thoughts'
- "The Great Collapse", a 2009 song by 'The Zolas' off the album Tic Toc Tic
- "The Great Collapse", a 2007 song by 'Shadows Fall' off the album Threads of Life
- "The Great Collapse", a 2000 song by 'Nine Inch Nails' off the album Things Falling Apart
- "Great Collapse", chapter 224 of Coppelion; see List of Coppelion chapters
- The Great Collapse, a fictional event in Lord of Vermilion fictional universe
- The Great Collapse, a fictional event in Code Vein fictional universe
- The Great Collapse, a fictional event in Phantasy Star fictional universe
- Great Collapse, a recurrent fictional event in the Blood Blockade Battlefront fictional universe; see List of Blood Blockade Battlefront characters

== See also ==
- Collapse (disambiguation)
- Great (disambiguation)
