= Integration =

Integration may refer to:

== Biology ==
- Multisensory integration
- Path integration
- Pre-integration complex, viral genetic material used to insert a viral genome into a host genome
- DNA integration, by means of site-specific recombinase technology, performed by a specific class of recombinase enzymes ("integrases")

== Economics and law ==
- Economic integration, trade unification between different states
- Horizontal integration and vertical integration, in microeconomics and strategic management, styles of ownership and control
- Regional integration, in which states cooperate through regional institutions and rules
- Integration clause, a declaration that a contract is the final and complete understanding of the parties
- A step in the process of money laundering
- Integrated farming, a farm management system
- Integration (tax), a feature of corporate and personal income tax in some countries
- Territorial integration of independent or dependent territories into a state

== Engineering ==
- Data integration
- Digital integration
- Enterprise integration
- Integrated architecture, in an Enterprise architecture framework approach such as DoDAF
- Integrated circuit, an electronic circuit whose components are manufactured in one flat piece of semiconductor material
- Integrated design, an approach to design which brings together specialisms usually considered separately
- Integrated product team, use of a team including multiple disciplines (e.g. customer, engineer, support, testing)
- Integrated software
- System integration, engineering practices for assembling large and complicated systems from units, particularly subsystems

== Mathematics ==
- Integration, the computation of an integral
  - Indefinite integration, the computation of antiderivatives
  - Numerical integration, computing an integral with a numerical method, usually with a computer
  - Integration by parts, a method for computing the integral of a product of functions
  - Integration by substitution, a method for computing integrals, by using a change of variable
  - Symbolic integration, the computation, mostly on computers, of antiderivatives and definite integrals in term of formulas
- Integration, the computation of a solution of a differential equation or a system of differential equations:
  - Integrability conditions for differential systems
  - Integrable system
- Order of integration, in statistics, a summary statistic for a time series

== Sociology ==
- Social integration, in social science, a movement of newcomers or marginalized minorities into the mainstream of a society
- Racial integration, including desegregation and other changes in social opportunity and culture
  - Desegregation, ending a separation of races, particularly in the context of the American civil rights movement
- Educational integration of students with disabilities
- Integration of immigrants

== Other uses ==
- Integration (festival), an annual technology and cultural festival managed by the Indian Statistical Institute
- Integration (album), a 2011 album by Kellee Maize
- Integration, an album by Kultur Shock

== See also ==
- Desegregation, the process of ending the separation of two groups, usually races
- Interdisciplinarity, involves the combining of two or more academic disciplines into one activity (e.g. a research project)
- Integrity, a concept of consistency of actions, values, methods, measures, principles, expectations, and outcomes
- Disintegration (disambiguation)
- Integral (disambiguation)
