= History of the United States (1917–1945) =

The United States of America
- 1917–1945
History of the United States (1865–1917)	History of the United States (1945–1964)
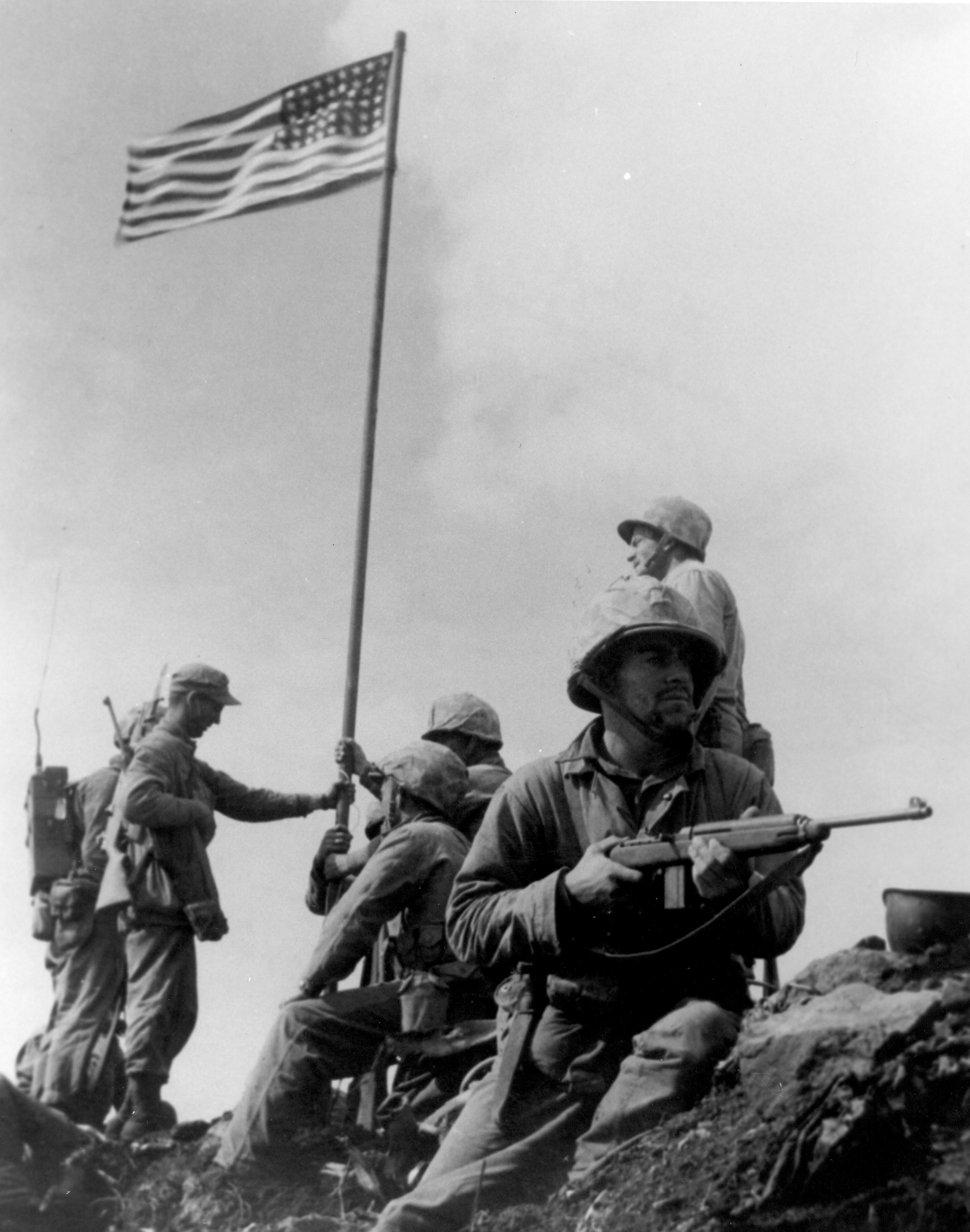
- The Battle of Iwo Jima, 1945. The World Wars ended the United States' policy of isolationism and left it as a world superpower.
- Location: United States
- Including: Third Great Awakening; World War I Roaring Twenties; Great Depression; New Deal Era; World War II; Migrations: Great Migration; Great Plains Exodus; Appalachian migration; Okie migration
- President(s): Woodrow Wilson; Warren G. Harding; Calvin Coolidge; Herbert Hoover; Franklin D. Roosevelt; Harry S. Truman
- Key events: World War I First Red Scare; Women's Suffrage Movement; Prohibition Era; Second KKK; Banana Wars; Wall Street Crash of 1929; Bonus Army; Great Depression; New Deal; Attack on Pearl Harbor; Manhattan Project; Formation of the United Nations

The history of the United States from 1917 to 1945 was marked by World War I, the interwar period, the Great Depression, World War II and is widely considered one of the most consequential and transformative eras in American history.

The United States tried and failed to broker a peace settlement for World War I, then entered the war after Germany launched a submarine campaign against U.S. merchant ships that were supplying Germany's enemy countries. The publicly stated goals were to uphold American honor, crush German militarism, and reshape the postwar world. After a slow mobilization, the United States of America helped bring about a decisive victory by supplying badly needed financing, food, and millions of fresh and eager soldiers. After the war, the United States of America rejected the Treaty of Versailles and did not join the League of Nations.

In 1920, the manufacture, sale, import and export of alcohol was prohibited by the Eighteenth Amendment to the United States Constitution. Possession of liquor, and drinking it, was never illegal before. The overall level of alcohol consumption did go down, however, state and local governments avoided aggressive enforcement. The federal government was overwhelmed with cases, so that bootlegging and speakeasies flourished in every city. Well-organized criminal gangs exploded in numbers, finances, power, and influence on city politics.

A few local domestic-terrorist attacks from radicals, like the 1920 Wall Street Bombing and the 1919 United States anarchist bombings sparked the first Red Scare. Culture wars between fundamentalist Christians and modernists became more intense, as demonstrated by prohibition, the Ku Klux Klan (KKK), and the highly publicized Scopes Trial.

The nation enjoyed a period of sustained prosperity in the 1920s. Agriculture went through a bubble in soaring land prices that collapsed in 1921, and that sector remained depressed. Coal mining was shrinking as oil became the main energy source. Otherwise most sectors prospered. Construction flourished as office buildings, factories, paved roads, and new housing was evident everywhere. Automobile production soared, suburban housing expanded and the nation's homes, towns and cities were electrified, along with some farms. Prices were stable, and the Gross Domestic Product (GDP) grew steadily until 1929, when the financial speculation bubble burst as Wall Street crashed.

In foreign policy President Wilson helped found the League of Nations but the U.S. never joined it, as the Congress refused to give up its constitutional role in declaring war. The nation instead took the initiative to disarm the world, most notably at the Washington Conference in 1921–22. Washington also helped stabilize the European economy through the Dawes Plan and the Young Plan. The Immigration Act of 1924 was aimed at stabilizing the traditional ethnic balance and strictly limiting the total inflow. The act completely blocked Asian immigrants, providing no means for them to get in.

The Wall Street Crash of 1929 and the ensuing Great Depression led to government efforts to restart the economy and help its victims. The recovery, however, was very slow. The nadir of the Great Depression was 1933, and recovery was rapid until the recession of 1938 proved a setback. There were no major new industries in the 1930s that were big enough to drive growth the way autos, electricity and construction had been so powerful in the 1920s. GDP surpassed 1929 levels in 1940.

By 1939, isolationist sentiment in America had ebbed, and after the stunning fall of France in 1940 to Nazi Germany, the United States began rearming itself and sent a large stream of money and military supplies to Britain and the Soviet Union. Following the attack on Pearl Harbor, the United States entered World War II to fight against Nazi Germany, Fascist Italy, and Imperial Japan, known as the "Axis powers". Italy surrendered in 1943, and Germany and Japan in 1945, after massive devastation and loss of life, while the US emerged far richer and with few casualties.

== World War I ==
=== Entry ===
Firmly maintaining neutrality when World War I began in Europe in 1914, the United States helped supply the Allies, but could not ship anything to the Central Powers because of the British blockade of Germany. Sympathies among many politically and culturally influential Americans had favored the British cause from the start of the war, as typified by industrialist Samuel Insull, born in London, who helped young Americans enlist in British or Canadian forces. On the other hand, especially in the Midwest, many Irish Americans and German Americans opposed any American involvement, the Irish because they hated the British, and the Germans because they feared they would come under personal attack. The suffragist movement included many pacifists, and most churches opposed the war.

German efforts to use their submarines ("U-boats") to blockade Britain resulted in the deaths of American travelers and sailors, and attacks on passenger liners caused public outrage. Most notable was torpedoing without warning the passenger liner Lusitania in 1915. Germany promised not to repeat; however it reversed position in early 1917, believing that unrestricted U-boat warfare against all ships headed to Britain would win the war, albeit at the cost of American entry. When Americans read the text of the German offer to Mexico, known as the Zimmermann Telegram, they saw an offer for Mexico to go to war with Germany against the United States, with German funding, with the promise of the return of the lost territories of Arizona, New Mexico, and Texas. On April 1, 1917, Wilson called for war, emphasizing that the U.S. had to fight to maintain its honor and to have a decisive voice in shaping the new postwar world. Congress voted on April 6, 1917, to declare war, but it was far from unanimous.

=== Germany ===
German Americans were sometimes accused of being too sympathetic to the German Empire. Former president Theodore Roosevelt denounced "hyphenated Americanism", insisting that dual loyalties were impossible in wartime. A small minority came out for Germany, or ridiculed the British. About 1% of the 480,000 enemy aliens of German birth were imprisoned in 1917–18. The allegations included spying for Germany, or endorsing the German war effort. Thousands were forced to buy war bonds to show their loyalty. One person was killed by a mob; in Collinsville, Illinois, German-born Robert Prager was dragged from jail as a suspected spy and lynched. The war saw a phobia of anything German engulf the nation; sauerkraut was rechristened "liberty cabbage".

=== Patriotism ===
The Wilson Administration created the Committee on Public Information (CPI) to control war information and provide pro-war propaganda. The private American Protective League, working with the Federal Bureau of Investigation, was one of many private right-wing "patriotic associations" that sprang up to support the war and at the same time fight labor unions and various left-wing and anti-war organizations. The U.S. Congress passed, and Wilson signed, the Espionage Act of 1917 and the Sedition Act of 1918. The Sedition Act criminalized any expression of opinion that used "disloyal, profane, scurrilous or abusive language" about the U.S. government, flag or armed forces. Government police action, private vigilante groups and public war hysteria compromised the civil liberties of many Americans who disagreed with Wilson's policies.

=== Draft ===
Navy poster by Howard Chandler Christy

The United States was remarkably unprepared for war in 1917, since it had not fought a major conflict since 1865. The military was small by modern standards and used out-dated weapons. A hasty expansion and modernization of the armed forces was thus launched. The draft began in spring 1917 but volunteers were also accepted. Four million men and thousands of women joined the services for the duration.

=== Economic confusion in 1917 ===
In terms of munitions production, the 15 months after April 1917 involved an amazing parade of mistakes, misguided enthusiasm, and confusion. Americans were willing enough, but they did not know their proper role. Washington was unable to figure out what to do when, or even to decide who was in charge. Typical of the confusion was the coal shortage that hit in December 1917. Because coal was by far the major source of energy and heat a grave crisis ensued. There was in fact plenty of coal being mined, but 44,000 loaded freight and coal cars were tied up in horrendous traffic jams in the rail yards of the East Coast. Two hundred ships were waiting in New York Harbor for cargo that was delayed by the mess. The solution included nationalizing the coal mines and the railroads for the duration, shutting down factories one day a week to save fuel, and enforcing a strict system of priorities. Only in March 1918 did Washington finally take control of the crisis.

=== Women ===
The war saw many women taking what were traditionally men's jobs for the first time. Many worked on the assembly lines of factories, producing tanks, trucks and munitions. For the first time, department stores employed African American women as elevator operators and cafeteria waitresses. The Food Administration helped housewives prepare nutritious meals with less waste and with optimum use of the foods available. Most important, the morale of the women remained high, as millions joined the Red Cross as volunteers to help soldiers and their families. With rare exceptions, the women did not protest the draft.

=== Labor ===
Samuel Gompers, head of the American Federation of Labor, and nearly all labor unions were strong supporters of the war effort. They minimized strikes as wages soared and full employment was reached. The AFL unions strongly encouraged their young men to enlist in the military, and fiercely opposed efforts to reduce recruiting and slow war production by the anti-war labor union called the Industrial Workers of the World (IWW) and also left-wing Socialists. President Wilson appointed Gompers to the powerful Council of National Defense, where he set up the War Committee on Labor. The AFL membership soared to 2.4 million in 1917. In 1919, the Union tried to make their gains permanent and called a series of major strikes in meat, steel and other industries. The strikes, all of which failed, forced unions back to their position around 1910. Anti-war socialists controlled the IWW, which fought against the war effort and was in turn shut down by legal action by the federal government.

=== American Expeditionary Forces ===
On the battlefields of the Western Front, the fresh American Expeditionary Forces troops were enthusiastically welcomed by the war-weary Allied armies in the summer of 1918. They arrived at the rate of 10,000 a day, at a time that the Imperial German Army was unable to replace its losses. After the Allies turned back the powerful final German offensive (Spring Offensive), the Americans played a central role in the Allied final offensive (Hundred Days Offensive). Victory over Germany was achieved on November 11, 1918.

Using questionnaires filled out by doughboys as they left the Army, Gutièrrez reported they were not cynical or disillusioned. They fought "for honor, manhood, comrades, and adventure, but especially for duty."

=== Aftermath ===
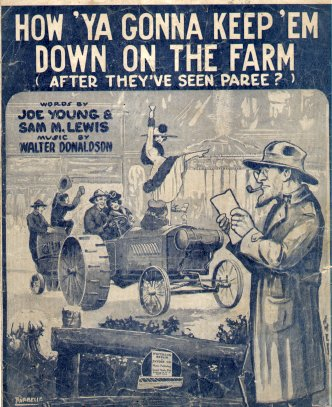
A 1919 sheet music cover, noting that many young people were abandoning farms for the excitement of the cities

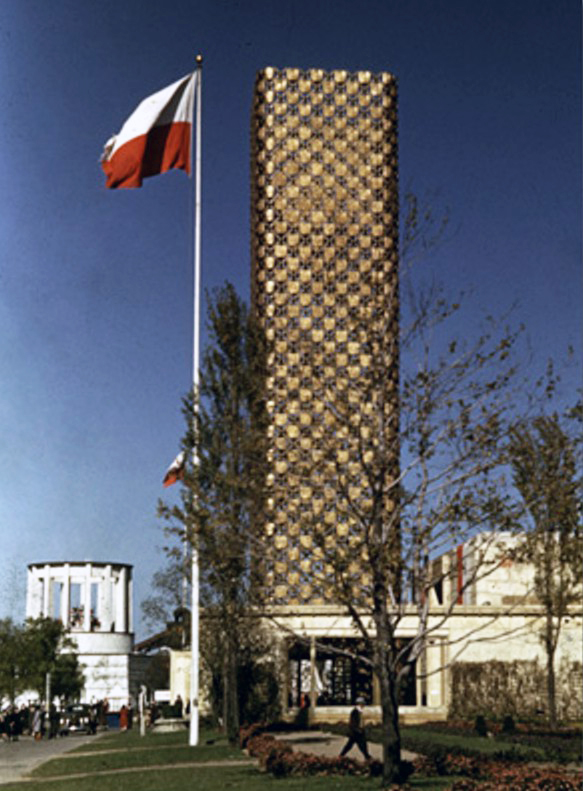
Photo taken with newly invented Kodachrome film at the 1939 New York World's Fair, with the League of Nations and the Polish pavilions visible

A popular Tin Pan Alley song of 1919 asked, concerning the United States troops returning from World War I, "How Ya Gonna Keep 'em Down on the Farm (After They've Seen Paree)?". In fact, many did not remain "down on the farm"; there was a great migration of youth from farms to nearby towns and smaller cities. The average distance moved was only 10 miles (16 km). Few went to the cities with over 100,000 people. However, agriculture became increasingly mechanized with widespread use of the tractor, other heavy equipment, and superior techniques disseminated through County Agents, who were employed by state agricultural colleges and funded by the Federal government.

In 1919, Woodrow Wilson campaigned for congress to ratify the Treaty of Versailles and allow the U.S. to join the new League of Nations, which he had been instrumental in creating. Wilson rejected the Republican compromise on the issue, and it failed for lack of a 2/3 majority. During his grueling cross-country tour to promote the League, Wilson suffered a series of strokes. He never recovered physically and lost his leadership skills and was unable to negotiate or compromise. The Senate rejected entry into the League and the U.S. never joined.

Defeat in the Great War left Germany in a state of revolutionary turmoil and heavily in debt for war reparations, payments to the victorious Allies. The Allies in turn owed large sums to the US Treasury for war loans. Under the multi-national Dawes Plan, American and British banks loaned money to Germany to stabilize its currency and expand production, which then allowed it to pay reparations to countries like Britain and France. In the 1920s, European and American economies reached new levels of industrial production and prosperity.

== 1919: strikes, riots and scares ==
Urban America was in turmoil throughout 1919. The huge number of returning veterans could not find work, something the Wilson administration had given little thought to. After the war, fear of subversion resumed in the context of the Red Scare, massive strikes in major industries (steel, meatpacking) and violent race riots. Radicals bombed Wall Street, and workers went on strike in Seattle in February. During 1919, a series of more than 20 riotous and violent black-white race-related incidents occurred. These included the Chicago, Omaha, and Elaine massacre.

A phenomenon known as the Red Scare took place 1918–1919. With the rise of violent Communist revolutions in Europe, leftist radicals were emboldened by the Bolshevik Revolution in Russia and were eager to respond to Lenin's call for world revolution. On May 1, 1919, a parade in Cleveland, Ohio, protesting the imprisonment of the Socialist Party leader, Eugene Debs, erupted into the violent May Day Riots. A series of bombings by the far left in 1919 and assassination attempts further inflamed the situation. Attorney General A. Mitchell Palmer conducted the Palmer Raids, a series of raids and arrests of non-citizen socialists, anarchists, radical unionists, and immigrants. They were charged with planning to overthrow the government. By 1920, over 10,000 arrests were made, and the immigrants caught up in these raids were deported back to Europe, most notably the anarchist Emma Goldman, who years before had attempted to assassinate industrialist Henry Clay Frick.

== Women's suffrage ==
After a long period of agitation, U.S. women were able in 1920 to obtain the necessary votes from a majority of men to obtain the right to vote in all state and federal elections. Women participated in the 1920 presidential and congressional elections.

Politicians responded to the new electorate by emphasizing issues of special interest to women, especially prohibition, child health, public schools, and world peace. Women did respond to these issues, but in terms of general voting they shared the same outlook and the same voting behavior as men.

The suffrage organization NAWSA became the League of Women Voters. Alice Paul's National Woman's Party began lobbying for full equality and the Equal Rights Amendment, which would pass Congress during the second wave of the women's movement in 1972, but was not ratified and never took effect. The main surge of women voting came in 1928, when the big-city machines realized they needed the support of women to elect Al Smith, while rural dry counties mobilized women to support Prohibition and vote for Republican Herbert Hoover. Catholic women were reluctant to vote in the early 1920s, but they registered in very large numbers for the 1928 election—the first in which Catholicism was a major issue. A few women were elected to office, but none became especially prominent during this time period. Overall, the women's rights movement was dormant in the 1920s, since Susan B. Anthony and the other prominent activists had died, and apart from Alice Paul few younger women came along to replace them.

== Roaring Twenties ==
In the U.S. presidential election of 1920, the Republican Party returned to the White House with the landslide victory of Warren G. Harding, who promised a "return to normalcy" after the years of war, ethnic hatreds, race riots and exhausting reforms. Harding used new advertising techniques to lead the GOP to a massive landslide, carrying the major cities as many Irish Catholics and Germans, feeling betrayed, temporarily deserted the Democrats.

=== Prosperity ===
Except for the Recession of 1920–1921, the economy enjoyed a long period of prosperity. Good times were widespread for all sectors (except agriculture and coal mining). New industries flourished especially electric power, movies, automobiles, gasoline, tourist travel, highway construction, and housing.

"The business of America is business," proclaimed President Coolidge. Entrepreneurship flourished and was widely hailed. Business interests had captured control of the regulatory agencies established before 1915 and used progressive rhetoric, emphasizing technological efficiency and prosperity as the keys to social improvement. William Allen White, a leading progressive spokesman, supported GOP candidate Herbert Hoover in 1928 as one who could "spiritualize" business prosperity and make it serve progressive ends.

The energy was a key to the economy, especially electricity, and oil. As electrification reached all the cities and towns, consumers demanded new products such as light bulbs, refrigerators, and toasters. Factories installed electric motors and saw productivity surge. With the oil booms in Texas, Oklahoma, and California, the United States dominated world petroleum production, now even more important in an age of automobiles and trucks.

==== Herbert Hoover ====
Herbert Hoover became world famous by leading the Commission for Relief in Belgium in World War I. He directed the U.S. Food Administration when the U.S. entered the war and served as Secretary of Commerce in the 1920s. An energetic exponent of progressivism he promoted engineering-style efficiency in business and public service, and promoted standardization, elimination of waste, and international trade. He easily won the Republican presidential nomination in 1928 and defeated Democrat Al Smith in a landslide.

The promise of prosperity made Hoover president, but the reality of economic decline ruined him, as Democrats tarred him with blame for the Great Depression in the United States. He was falsely accused of ignoring the crisis. Starting in late 1929 he tried multiple new ways to reverse the economic collapse as the world-wide Great Depression engulfed the United States. He called in all the experts for advice and looked for voluntary solutions that did not require government compulsion. No matter what he did the economy spiraled downward, hitting bottom just as he left office in early 1933. He lacked the political skills to rally support and was defeated in a landslide in 1932 by Franklin D. Roosevelt. After this loss, Hoover became staunchly conservative, and spoke widely against liberal New Deal policies.

=== Unions ===
Labor unions grew very rapidly during the war, emerging with a large membership, full treasuries, and a temporary government guarantee of the right of collective bargaining. Inflation was high during the war, but wages went up even faster. However, unions were weak in heavy industry, such as automobiles and steel. Their main strength was in construction, printing, railroads, and other crafts where the AFL had a strong system in place. Total union membership had soared from 2.7 million in 1914 to 5 million at its peak in 1919. An aggressive spirit appeared in 1919, as demonstrated by the general strike in Seattle and the police strike in Boston. The larger unions made a dramatic move for expansion in 1919 by calling major strikes in clothing, meatpacking, steel, coal, and railroads. The corporations fought back, and the strikes failed. The unions held on to their gains among machinists, textile workers, and seamen, and in such industries as food and clothing, but overall membership fell back to 3.5 million, where it stagnated until the New Deal passed the Wagner Act in 1935.

Real earnings (after taking inflation, unemployment, and short hours into account) of all employees doubled over 1918–45. Setting 1918 as 100, the index went to 112 in 1923, 122 in 1929, 81 in 1933 (the low point of the depression), 116 in 1940, and 198 in 1945.

The bubble of the late 1920s was reflected by the extension of credit to a dangerous degree, including in the stock market, which rose to record high levels. Government size had been at low levels, causing major freedom of the economy and more prosperity. It became apparent in retrospect after the stock market crash of 1929 that credit levels had become dangerously inflated.

=== Immigration restriction ===
The United States became more anti-immigration in outlook during this period. The American Immigration Act of 1924 limited immigration from countries where 2% of the total U.S. population, per the 1890 census (not counting African Americans), were immigrants from that country. Thus, the massive influx of Europeans that had come to America during the first two decades of the century slowed to a trickle. Asians and citizens of India were prohibited from immigrating altogether.

=== Jazz ===
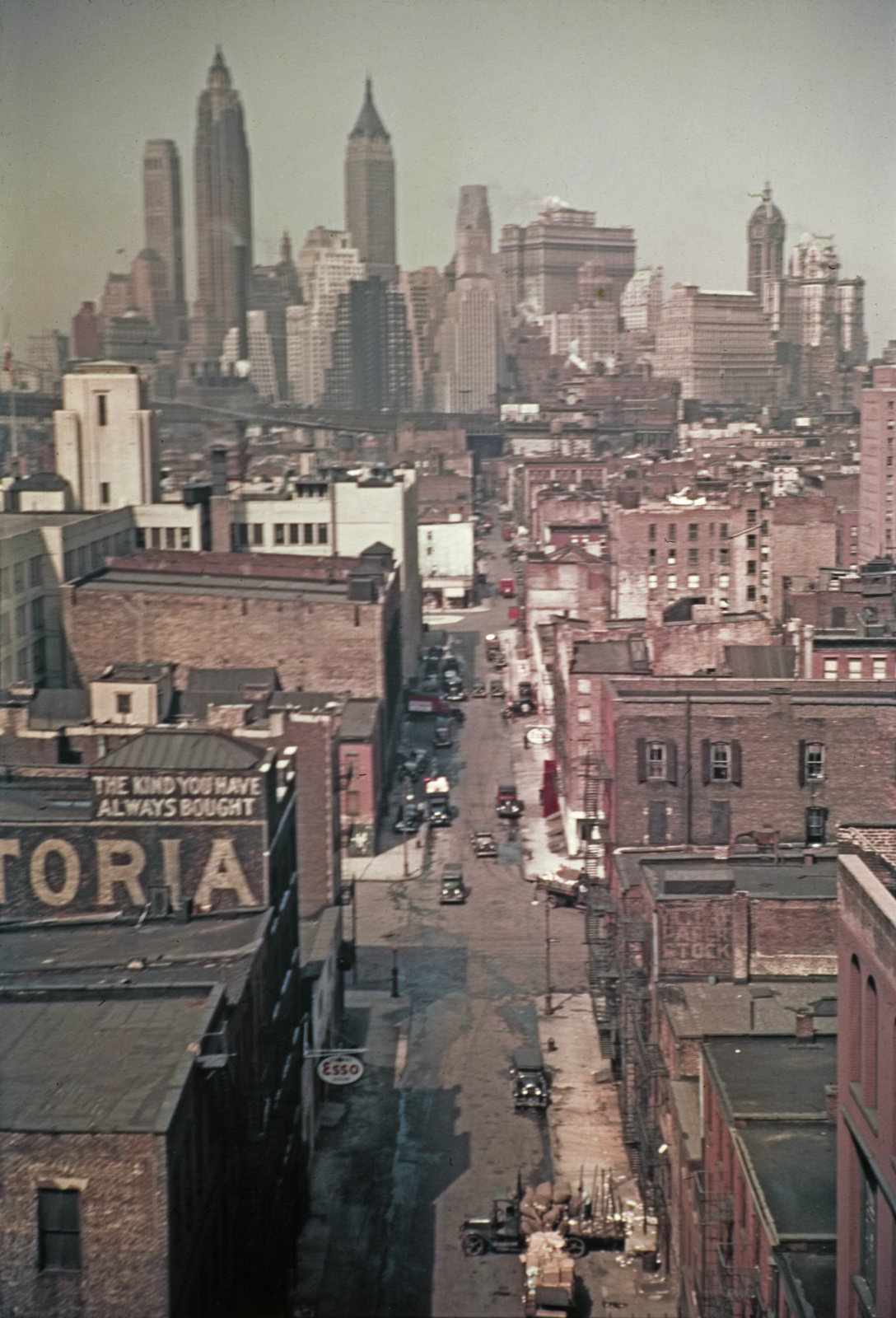
Manhattan in the New York City photographed in 1938 using newly invented Agfacolor photo

The "Jazz Age" symbolized the popularity of new musics and dance forms, which attracted younger people in all the large cities as the older generation worried about the threat of looser sexual standards as suggested by the uninhibited "flapper." In every locality, Hollywood discovered an audience for its silent films. It was an age of celebrities and heroes, with movie stars, boxers, home run hitters, tennis aces, and football standouts grabbing widespread attention.

Black culture, especially in music and literature, flourished in many cities such as New Orleans, Memphis, and Chicago but nowhere more than in New York City, site of the Harlem Renaissance. The Cotton Club nightclub and the Apollo Theater became famous venues for artists and writers.

Radio was a new industry that grew explosively from homemade crystal sets, picking up faraway stations to stations in every large city by the mid-decade. By 1927 two national networks had been formed, the NBC Red Network and the Blue Network (ABC). The broadcast fare was mostly music, especially by big bands.

=== Prohibition ===
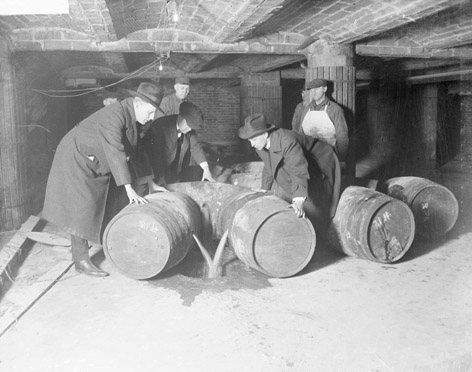
Prohibition agents destroying barrels of alcohol

In 1920, the manufacture, sale, import and export of alcohol was prohibited by the Eighteenth Amendment to the United States Constitution in an attempt to alleviate high rates of alcoholism and, especially, political corruption led by saloon-based politicians. It was enforced at the federal level by the Volstead Act. Most states let the federals do the enforcing. Drinking or owning liquor was not illegal, only the manufacture or sale. National Prohibition ended in 1933, although it continued for a while in some states. Prohibition is considered by most (but not all) historians to have been a failure because organized crime was strengthened.

=== Ku Klux Klan ===
Ku Klux Klan (KKK) is the name of three entirely different organizations (1860s, 1920s, post 1960) that used the same nomenclature and costumes but had no direct connection. The KKK of the 1920s was a purification movement that rallied against crime, especially violation of prohibition, and decried the growing "influence" of "big-city" Catholics and Jews, many of them immigrants and their descendants from Ireland as well as Southern and Eastern Europe. Its membership was often exaggerated but possibly reached as many as 4 million men, but no prominent national figure claimed membership; no daily newspaper endorsed it, and indeed most actively opposed the Klan. Membership was verily evenly spread across the nation's white Protestants, North, West, and South, urban and rural. Historians in recent years have explored the Klan in depth. The KKK of the 1860s and the current KKK were indeed violent. However, historians discount lurid tales of a murderous group in the 1920s. Some crimes were probably committed in Deep South states but were quite uncommon elsewhere. The local Klans seem to have been poorly organized and were exploited as money-making devices by organizers more than anything else. Organizers charged a $10 application fee and up to $50 for costumes. Nonetheless, the KKK had become prominent enough that it staged a huge rally in Washington DC in 1925. Soon afterward, the national headlines reported rape and murder by the KKK leader in Indiana, and the group quickly lost its mystique and nearly all its members.

=== Scopes "Monkey" Trial ===
The Scopes Trial of 1925 was a Tennessee court case that tested a state law which forbade the teaching of "any theory that denies the story of the Divine Creation of man as taught in the Bible, and to teach instead that man has descended from a lower order of animals." The law was the result of a systematic drive by religious Fundamentalists to throw back the onslaught of modern ideas in theology and science. In a spectacular trial that drew national attention thanks to the roles of three-time Democratic presidential candidate William Jennings Bryan for the prosecution and famed lawyer Clarence Darrow for the defense, John T. Scopes was convicted of teaching evolution, but the verdict was overturned on a technicality. The Fundamentalists were widely ridiculed, with writers like H. L. Mencken poking merciless ridicule at them; their efforts to pass state laws proved a failure.

=== Federal government ===
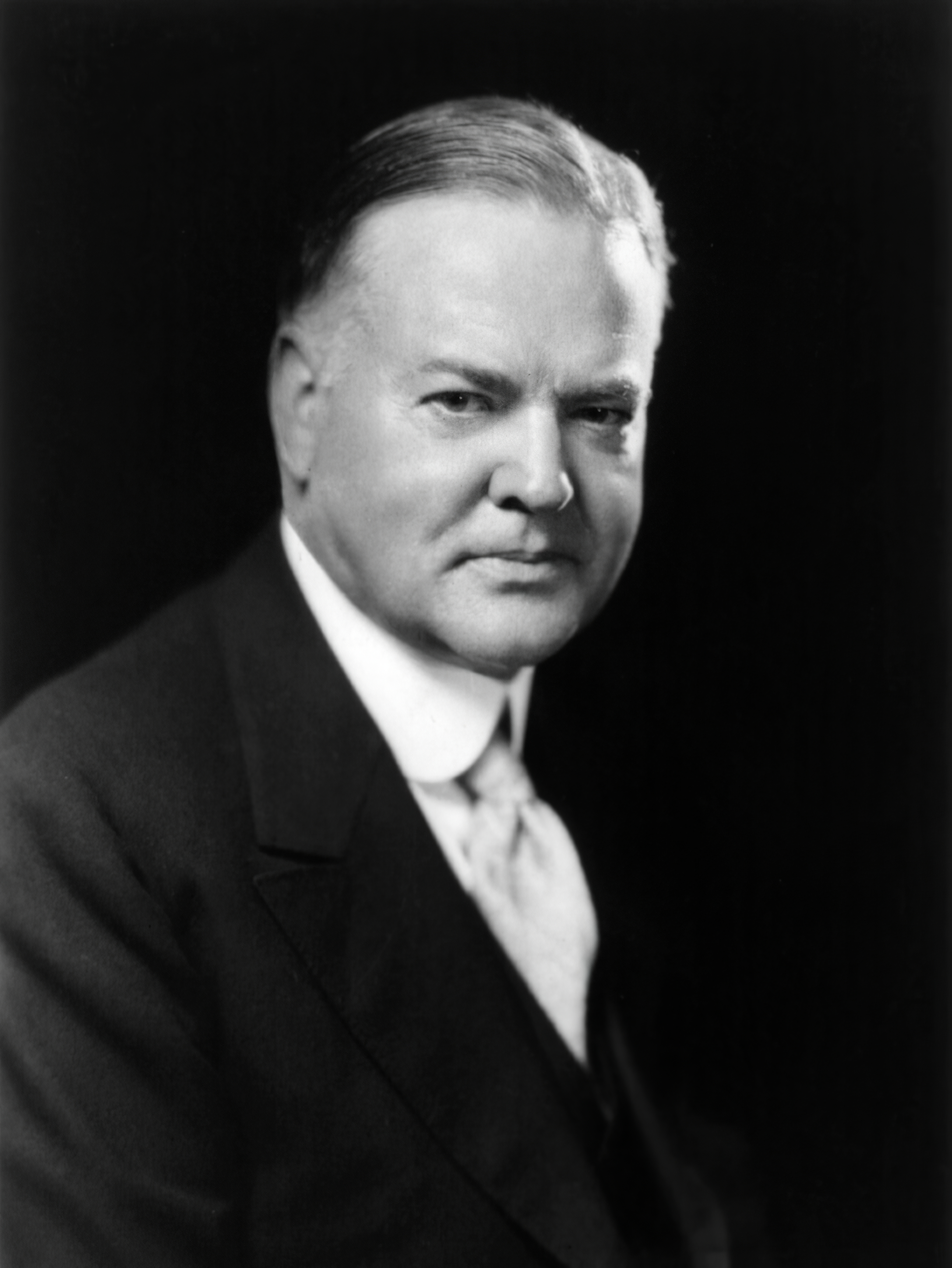
Herbert Hoover

Led by Commerce Secretary Herbert Hoover, the federal government in the 1920s took on an increasing role in business and economic affairs. In addition to Prohibition, the government obtained new powers and duties such as funding and overseeing the new U.S. Highway system, controlling agriculture, and regulating radio and commercial aviation. The result was a rapid spread of standardized roads and broadcasts that were welcomed by most Americans.

The Harding Administration was rocked by the Teapot Dome scandal, the most famous of a number of episodes involving Harding's cabinet members. The president, exhausted and dismayed from the news of the scandals, died of a heart attack in August 1923. His vice-president, Calvin Coolidge, succeeded him. Coolidge could not have been a more different personality than his predecessor. Dour, puritanical, and spotlessly honest, his White House stood in sharp contrast to the drinking, gambling, and womanizing that went on under Harding. In 1924, he was easily elected in his own right with the slogan "Keep Cool With Coolidge". Overall, the Harding and Coolidge administrations marked a return to the hands-off style of 19th-century presidents in contrast to the activism of Roosevelt and Wilson. Coolidge, who spent the entire summer on vacation during his years in office, famously said "The business of the American people is business."

When Coolidge declined to run again in the 1928 election, the Republican Party nominated engineer and Secretary of Commerce Herbert Hoover, who was elected by a wide margin over Al Smith, the first Catholic nominee. Hoover was a technocrat who had low regard for politicians. Instead he was a believer in the efficacy of individualism and business enterprise, with a little coordination by the government, to cure all problems. He envisioned a future of unbounded plenty and the imminent end of poverty in America. A year after his election, the stock market crashed, and the nation's economy slipped downward into the Great Depression.

After the crash, Hoover attempted to put in place many efforts to restore the economy, especially the fast-sinking agricultural sector. None worked. Hoover believed in stimulus spending and encouraged state and local governments, as well as the federal government, to spend heavily on public buildings, roads, bridges—and, most famously, the Hoover Dam on the Colorado River. But with tax revenues falling fast, the states and localities plunged into their own fiscal crises. Republicans, following their traditional mass drums, along with pressure from the farm bloc, passed the Smoot–Hawley Tariff Act, which raised tariffs. Canada and other nations retaliated by raising their tariffs on American goods and moving their trade in other directions. American imports and exports plunged by more than two thirds, but since international trade was less than 5% of the American economy, the damage done was limited. The entire world economy, led by the United States, had fallen into a downward spiral that got worse and worse, and in 1931–32 began plunging downward even faster. Hoover had Congress set up a new relief agency, the Reconstruction Finance Corporation, in 1932, but it proved too little too late.

== Great Depression ==
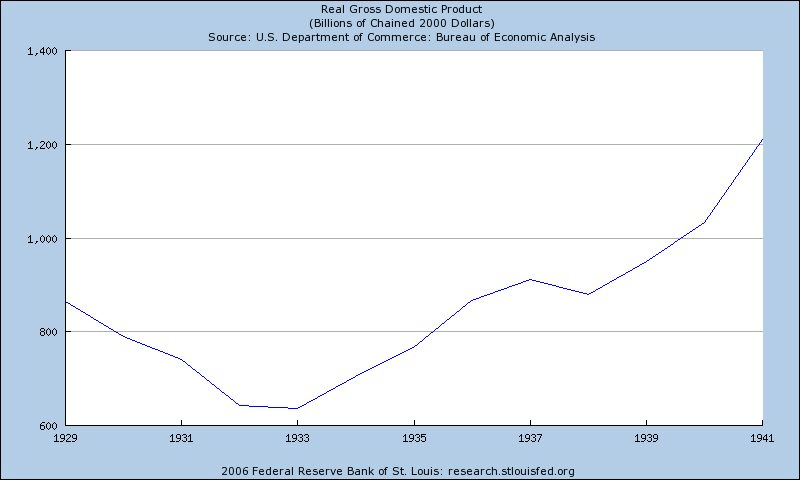
GDP in United States January 1929 to January 1941

Historians and economists still have not agreed on the causes of the Great Depression, but there is general agreement that it began in the United States in late 1929 and was either started or worsened by "Black Thursday," the stock market crash of Thursday, October 29, 1929. Sectors of the US economy had been showing some signs of distress for months before October 1929. Business inventories of all types were three times as large as they had been a year before (an indication that the public was not buying products as rapidly as in the past), and other signposts of economic health—freight carloads, industrial production, and wholesale prices—were slipping downward.

The events in the United States triggered a worldwide depression, which led to deflation and a great increase in unemployment. In the United States between 1929 and 1933, unemployment soared from 3% of the workforce to 25%, while manufacturing output collapsed by one-third. Local relief was overwhelmed. Unable to support their families, many unemployed men deserted (often going to "Hoovervilles") so the meager relief supplies their families received would stretch further. For many, their next meal was found at a soup kitchen, if at all.

Adding to the misery of the times, drought arrived in the Great Plains. Decades of bad farming practices caused the topsoil to erode, and combined with the weather conditions (the 1930s was the overall warmest decade of the 20th century in North America) caused an ecological disaster. The dry soil was lifted by wind and blown into huge dust storms that blanketed entire towns, a phenomenon that continued for several years. Those who had lost their homes and livelihoods in the Dust Bowl were lured westward by advertisements for work put out by agribusiness in western states, such as California. The migrants came to be called Okies, Arkies, and other derogatory names as they flooded the labor supply of the agricultural fields, driving down wages, pitting desperate workers against each other. They came into competition with Mexican laborers, who were deported en masse back to their home country.

In the South, the fragile economy collapsed further. To escape, rural workers and sharecroppers migrated north by train, both black and white. By 1940 they were attracted by booming munitions factories in plants in the Great Lakes region. Nationwide, farmers had been experiencing depressed market conditions for their crops and goods since the end of World War I. Many family farms that had been mortgaged during the 1920s to provide money to "get through until better times" were foreclosed when farmers were unable to make payments.

=== The New Deal ===
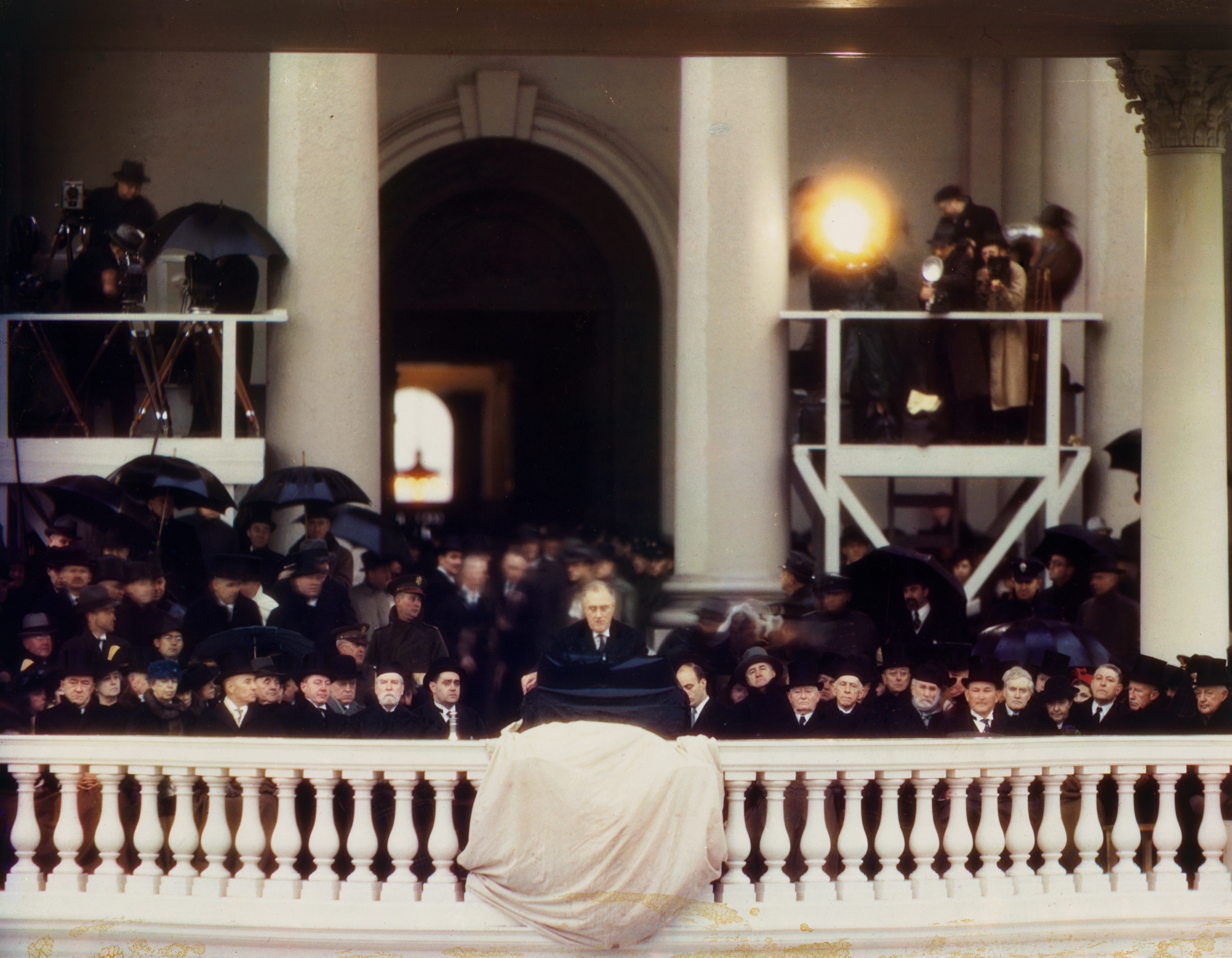
The second inauguration of Franklin D. Roosevelt as president of the United States was held on January 20, 1937 in Washington, D.C. Color photography by Harry Warnecke.

In the United States, upon accepting Democratic nomination for president in 1932, Franklin D. Roosevelt promised "a new deal for the American people," a phrase that has endured as a label for his administration and its many domestic achievements.

The Republicans, blamed for the Depression, or at least for lack of an adequate response to it, were easily defeated by Roosevelt in 1932.

Roosevelt entered office with no single ideology or plan for dealing with the depression. The "new deal" was often contradictory, pragmatic, and experimental. What some considered incoherence of the New Deal's ideology, however, was the presence of several competing ones, based on programs and ideas not without precedents in the American political tradition. The New Deal consisted of many different efforts to end the Great Depression and reform the American economy. Many of them failed, but there were enough successes to establish it as the most important episode of the 20th century in the creation of the modern American state.

The desperate economic situation, combined with the substantial Democratic victories in the 1932 Congressional elections, gave Roosevelt unusual influence over Congress in the "First Hundred Days" of his administration. He used his leverage to win rapid passage of a series of measures to create welfare programs and regulate the banking system, stock market, industry and agriculture.

=== "Bank holiday" and Emergency Banking Act ===
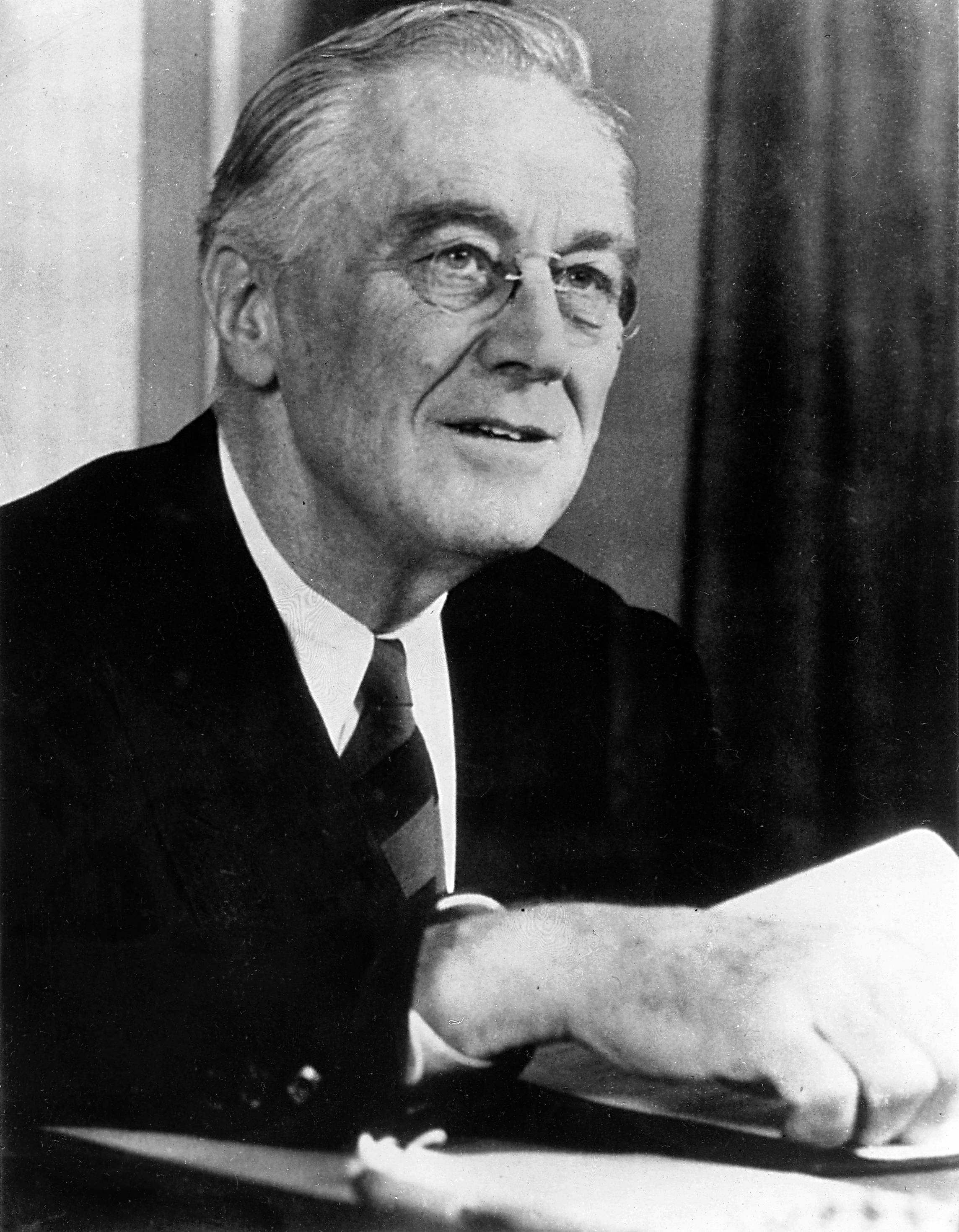
Roosevelt's ebullient public personality, conveyed through his declaration that "the only thing we have to fear is fear itself" and his "fireside chats" on the radio did a great deal to help restore the nation's confidence.

Fireside Chat 1 On the Banking Crisis
Roosevelt's first Fireside Chat on the Banking Crisis (March 12, 1933)

On March 6, two days after taking office, Roosevelt issued a proclamation closing all American banks for four days until Congress could meet in a special session. Ordinarily, such an action would cause widespread panic. But the action created a general sense of relief. First, many states had already closed down the banks before March 6. Second, Roosevelt astutely and euphemistically described it as a "bank holiday." And third, the action demonstrated that the federal government was stepping in to stop the alarming pattern of bank failures.

Three days later, President Roosevelt sent to Congress the Emergency Banking Act, a generally conservative bill, drafted in large part by holdovers from the Hoover administration, designed primarily to protect large banks from being dragged down by the failing smaller ones. The bill provided for United States Treasury Department inspection of all banks before they would be allowed to reopen, for federal assistance to tottering large institutions, and for a thorough reorganization of those in greatest difficulty. A confused and frightened Congress passed the bill within four hours of its introduction. Three-quarters of the banks in the Federal Reserve System reopened within the next three days, and $1 billion in hoarded currency and gold flowed back into them within a month. The immediate banking crisis was over. The Glass–Steagall Act established various provisions designed to prevent another Great Depression from happening again. These included separating investment from savings and loan banks and forbidding the purchase of stock with no money down. Roosevelt also removed the currency of the United States from the gold standard, which was widely blamed for limiting the money supply and causing deflation, although the silver standard remained until 1971. Private ownership of gold bullion and certificates was banned and would remain so until 1975.

=== Economy Act ===
On the morning after passage of the Emergency Banking Act, Roosevelt sent to Congress the Economy Act, which was designed to convince the public, and moreover the business community, that the federal government was in the hands of no radical. The act proposed to balance the federal budget by cutting the salaries of government employees and reducing pensions to veterans by as much as 15%.

Otherwise, Roosevelt warned, the nation faced a $1 billion deficit. The bill revealed clearly what Roosevelt had always maintained: that he was as much of a fiscal conservative at heart as his predecessor was. And like the banking bill, it passed through Congress almost instantly—despite heated protests by some congressional progressives.

=== Farm programs ===
The celebrated First Hundred Days of the new administration also produced a federal program to protect American farmers from the uncertainties of the market through subsidies and production controls, the Agricultural Adjustment Act (AAA), which Congress passed in May 1933. The AAA reflected the desires of leaders of various farm organizations and Roosevelt's Secretary of Agriculture, Henry A. Wallace.

Relative farm incomes had been falling for decades. The AAA included reworkings of many long-touted programs for agrarian relief, which had been demanded for decades. The most important provision of the AAA was the provision for crop reductions—the "domestic allotment" system, which was intended to raise prices for farm commodities by preventing surpluses from flooding the market and depressing prices further. The most controversial component of the system was the destruction in summer 1933 of growing crops and newborn livestock that exceeded the allotments. They had to be destroyed to get the plan working. However, gross farm incomes increased by half in the first three years of the New Deal and the relative position of farmers improved significantly for the first time in twenty years. Urban food prices went up slightly, because the cost of the grains was only a small fraction of what the consumer paid. Conditions improved for the great majority of commercial farmers by 1936. The income of the farm sector almost doubled from $4.5 billion in 1932 to $8.9 billion in 1941 just before the war. Meanwhile, food prices rose 22% in nine years from an index of 31.5 in 1932, to 38.4 in 1941.

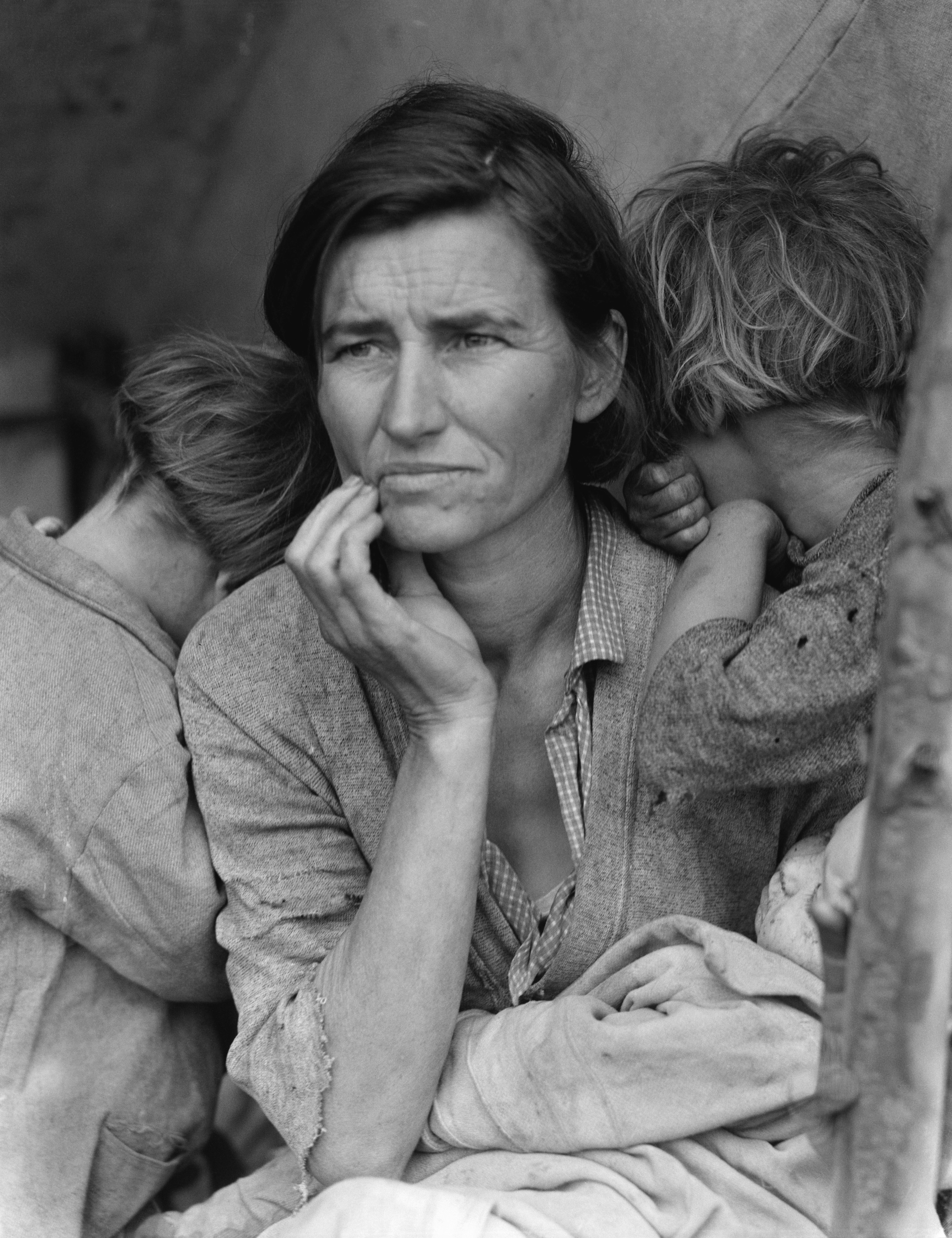
The Farm Security Administration used photography to document poverty in rural America. Dorothea Lange's Migrant Mother, depicts destitute pea pickers in California, centering on a mother of seven children, age thirty-two, in Nipomo, California, March 1936.

However, rural America contained many isolated farmers scratching out a subsistence income. The new deal set up programs such as the Resettlement Administration and the Farm Security Administration to help them, but was very reluctant to help them buy farms.

=== 'Alphabet soup' ===
Roosevelt also created an alphabet soup of new federal regulatory agencies such as the U.S. Securities and Exchange Commission (SEC) to oversee the stock market and a reform of the banking system that included the Federal Deposit Insurance Corporation (FDIC) to establish a system of insurance for deposits.

The most successful initiatives in alleviating the miseries of the Great Depression were a series of relief measures to aid some of the 15 million unemployed Americans, among them the Civilian Conservation Corps, the Civil Works Administration, and the Federal Emergency Relief Administration.

The early New Deal also began the Tennessee Valley Authority, an unprecedented experiment in flood control, public power, and regional planning.

=== Second New Deal ===
The Second New Deal (1935–36) was the second stage of the New Deal programs. President Franklin D. Roosevelt announced his main goals in January 1935: improved use of national resources, security against old age, unemployment and illness, and slum clearance, as well as a national welfare program (the WPA) to replace state relief efforts. The most important programs included Social Security, the National Labor Relations Act ("Wagner Act"), the Banking Act, rural electrification, and breaking up utility holding companies. Programs that were later ended by the Supreme Court or the Conservative coalition included the Works Progress Administration (WPA), the National Youth Administration (NYA), the Resettlement Administration, and programs for retail price control, farm rescues, coal stabilization, and taxes on the rich and the Undistributed profits tax. Liberals in Congress passed the Bonus Bill for World War veterans over FDR's veto.

The Second New Deal proved especially controversial as it attempted to redistribute wealth, income and power in favor of the poor, the old, farmers and labor unions. Liberals strongly supported the new direction, and formed the New Deal coalition of union members, big city machines, the white South, and ethnic minorities to support it. Conservatives, typified by the American Liberty League, were strongly opposed.

=== Labor agitation ===
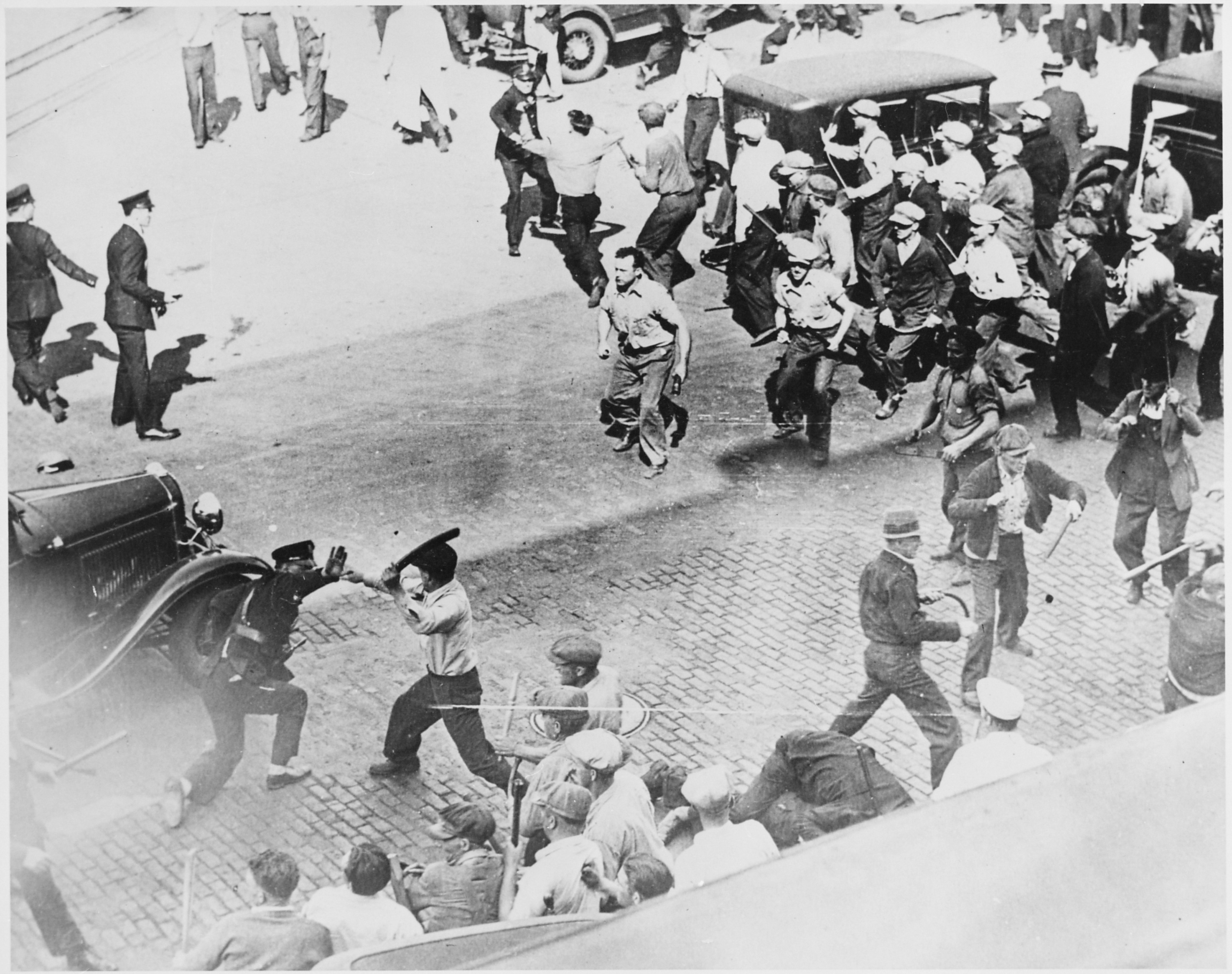
Workers and police battle in Minneapolis in June 1934

Roosevelt's first term saw a massive amount of labor upheaval. In 1934 alone, there was the 1934 West Coast waterfront strike that brought all of San Francisco into a four-day general strike, the Minneapolis Teamsters Strike of 1934 that brought the Teamsters and other unions out for a strike causing the governor to declare martial law, the 1934 textile workers strike that brought hundreds of thousands of textile workers on the East Coast out on strike, as well as other strikes.

The Industrial Workers of the World (IWW) and the communists no longer being a force in the labor movement, the conservative American Federation of Labor, which organized along craft union lines and which preached labor/capital cooperation, dominated the U.S. labor movement until the 1930s. In 1935, eight unions within the AFL organized the Congress of Industrial Organizations (CIO) to promote industrial unionism. The CIO unions were expelled by the AFL in 1936, and in 1938 they formed a rival federation to the AFL. The CIO had much success in organizing, with the Steel Workers Organizing Committee getting a contract with U.S. Steel in 1937, and winning the Flint Sit-Down Strike and getting General Motors to recognize the United Auto Workers (UAW) as the collective bargainer for GM workers. Having succeeded with GM, the UAW next turned its attention to Chrysler, which quickly came to terms. The last of the Big Three would prove to be a harder nut to crack, as Henry Ford remained absolutely opposed to unions. His security forces beat several UAW organizers outside the company's River Rouge plant in May 1937. Despite pressure on all fronts, Ford would not budge until a wildcat strike in 1941 convinced him to give in and unionize.

=== Recession of 1937 and recovery ===
The economy eventually recovered from the low point of the winter of 1932–33, with sustained improvement until 1937, when the Recession of 1937 brought back 1934 levels of unemployment. There is a broad consensus among scholars that the New Deal policies did not lengthen and deepen the depression; only 5% of professional historians and 27% of professional economists believe it served to lengthen and deepen the Great Depression. Apart from the WPA and CCC, most New Deal spending programs, such as the PWA and AAA, operated through private firms.

The New Deal and Roosevelt's leadership were under assault during Roosevelt's second term, which suffered new economic setbacks in the Recession of 1937. A sharp economic downturn began in the fall of 1937 and continued through most of 1938. Conservatives said it was caused by the labor unions' assault on industry through massive strikes and the way the New Deal discourages further investment. Keynesian economists argued it was a result of a premature effort by FDR to balance the budget by reducing federal spending. The administration reacted by launching a rhetorical campaign against business monopoly power, which was cast as the villain. The Supreme Court began busily dismantling the New Deal by ruling many of its programs unconstitutional and Roosevelt sought to replace the judges with more sympathetic ones in his infamous "Court Packing". Despite that, the New Deal gradually wound down and by 1939 the president had turned his attention towards foreign policy.

But the administration's other response to the 1937 downturn had more tangible results. Ignoring his own Treasury Department, Roosevelt embarked on an antidote to the depression, reluctantly abandoning his efforts to balance the budget and launching a $5 billion spending program in the spring of 1938, an effort to increase mass purchasing power and attack deflation. Roosevelt explained his program in a fireside chat in which he finally acknowledged that it was up to the government to "create an economic upturn" by making "additions to the purchasing power of the nation."

=== World War II and the end of the Great Depression ===
It was not until the administration expanded Federal spending to support World War II, that the nation's economy fully recovered. Between 1939 and 1944 (the peak of wartime production), the nation's output almost doubled. Consequently, unemployment plummeted—from 14% in 1940 to less than 2% in 1943, as the labor force grew by ten million.

The war economy was not so much a triumph of free enterprise as the result of government bankrolling business. While unemployment remained high throughout the New Deal years, consumption, investment, and net exports—the pillars of economic growth—remained low. It was World War II, not the New Deal, which finally ended the crisis. Nor did the New Deal substantially alter the distribution of power within American society and economy; and it had only a small impact on the distribution of wealth among the population.

=== Legacies of the New Deal ===
A 2017 review of the published scholarship summarized the findings of researchers as follows:

The studies find that public works and relief spending had state income multipliers of around one, increased consumption activity, attracted internal migration, reduced crime rates, and lowered several types of mortality. The farm programs typically aided large farm owners but eliminated opportunities for share croppers, tenants, and farm workers. The Home Owners' Loan Corporation's purchases and refinancing of troubled mortgages staved off drops in housing prices and home ownership rates at relatively low ex post cost to taxpayers. The Reconstruction Finance Corporation's loans to banks and railroads appear to have had little positive impact, although the banks were aided when the RFC took ownership stakes.

Although the New Deal did not end the depression, it increased the regulatory functions of the federal government in the stock market, the banking system, and others. It also produced a new political coalition that sustained the Democratic Party as the majority party in national politics for more than a generation after its own end.

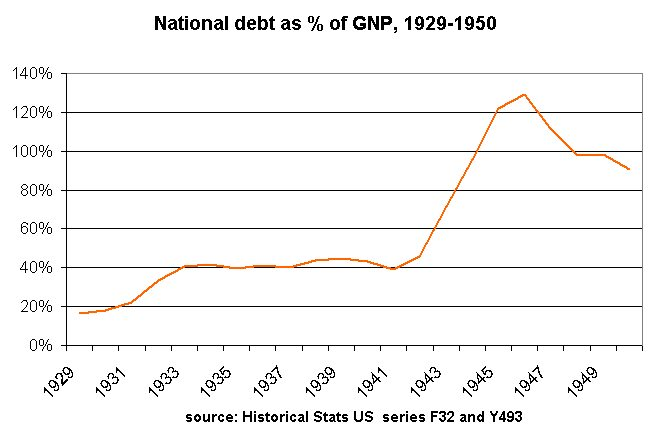
national debt/ GNP climbs from 20% to 40% under Hoover; levels off under FDR; soars during WW2 from Historical States US (1976)

Laying the foundations for the postwar era, Roosevelt and the New Deal helped enhance the power of the federal government as a whole. Roosevelt also established the presidency as the preeminent center of authority within the federal government. By creating a large array of protections for various groups of citizens—workers, farmers, and others—who suffered from the crisis, enabling them to challenge the powers of the corporations, the Roosevelt administration generated a set of political ideas—known to later generations as New Deal liberalism—that remained a source of inspiration for decades and that helped shape the next experiment in liberal reform, the Great Society of the 1960s.

On the other hand, the Roosevelt administration and its liberalism became the source of a vigorous conservative reaction. Led in Congress by Senator Robert A. Taft and the Conservative coalition, they blocked almost all New Deal proposals after 1938, and shut down the WPA, CCC and many other programs by 1943. Eventually in the 1970s and 1980s, a bipartisan coalition ended most New Deal regulations and programs. The most important remaining ones in the 21st century are Social Security and the Securities and Exchange Commission.

== Foreign policy, 1919–1941 ==
In the 1920s, American policy was an active participant in the international community, while it systematically ignoring the League of Nations. Instead Washington set up numerous diplomatic ventures, and used the enormous financial power of the United States to dictate major diplomatic questions in Europe.

Presidents Harding, Coolidge, and Hoover avoided any political commitments or alliances with anyone else. Franklin Roosevelt followed suit before World War II broke out in 1939. They minimized contact with the League of Nations. However, as historian Jerald Combs reports their administrations in no way returned to 19th-century isolationism. The key Republican leaders:

including Elihu Root, Charles Evans Hughes, and Hoover himself, were Progressives who accepted much of Wilson's internationalism. ... They did seek to use American political influence and economic power to goad European governments to moderate the Versailles peace terms, induce the Europeans to settle their quarrels peacefully, secure disarmament agreements, and strengthen the European capitalist economies to provide prosperity for them and their American trading partners.

The Washington Naval Conference was the most successful diplomatic venture in the 1920s. It was held in Washington, under the Chairmanship of Secretary of State Charles Evans Hughes from 12 November 1921 to 6 February 1922. Conducted outside the auspice of the League of Nations, it was attended by nine nations—the United States, Japan, China, France, Great Britain, Italy, Belgium, Netherlands, and Portugal. Russia and Germany were pariahs and were not invited. It focused on resolving misunderstandings or conflicts regarding interests in the Pacific Ocean and East Asia. The main achievement was a series of naval disarmament agreements agreed to by all the participants, that lasted for a decade. It resulted in three major treaties: Four-Power Treaty, Five-Power Treaty (the Washington Naval Treaty), the Nine-Power Treaty, and a number of smaller agreements. These treaties preserved peace during the 1920s but were not renewed, as the world scene turned increasingly negative after 1930.

The Dawes Plan was a multi-national attempt to solve to the crisis of reparations that arose when Germany failed to meet the war reparations required of it under the Treaty of Versailles. When Germany was declared in default, French and Belgian troops occupied the key industrial Ruhr district of Germany. The crisis was solved by a compromise in the form of the Dawes Plan in 1924. Under the plan, developed by a committee headed by American Charles G. Dawes, New York and London banks loaned Germany hundreds of millions of dollars to stabilize its currency and expand production, which then allowed it to pay reparations. Problems with the Dawes Plan, notably its lack of a total reparations amount, led to the 1928 Young Plan, developed under the leadership of the American Owen D. Young. It established German reparation requirements at 112 billion marks (US$26.3 billion) and created a schedule of payments that would see Germany complete payments by 1988. As a result of the severe impact of the Great Depression on the German economy, reparations were suspended for a year in 1931. A treaty to further reduce reparations was agreed on at the 1932 Lausanne Conference, but it failed to be ratified by the countries involved. Reparations were not restarted until after 1953, when West Germany paid the entire remaining balance.

=== Interwar US military ===
During the interwar years the US military was scaled back in size. Much of the US Army's equipment was outdated and many units were often larger on paper than in reality during the interwar period. During the interwar years the Navy got more funding as it was believed the Navy would be first in line if the country were to come under attack. With the onset of the Great Depression, there was bipartisan interest in cutting spending on the military. Military spending would begin to rise in the mid 1930s in response to international tension.

=== Mexico ===
Since the turmoil of the Mexican revolution had died down, the Harding administration was prepared to normalize relations with Mexico. Between 1911 and 1920 American imports from Mexico increased from $57,000,000 to $179,000,000 and exports from $61,000,000 to $208,000,000. Commerce Secretary Herbert Hoover took the lead in order to promote trade and investments other than in oil and land, which had long dominated bilateral economic ties. President Álvaro Obregón assured Americans that they would be protected in Mexico, and Mexico was granted recognition in 1923. A major crisis erupted in the mid-1930s when the Mexican government expropriated millions of acres of land from hundreds of American property owners as part of President Lázaro Cárdenas's land redistribution program. No compensation was provided to the American owners. The emerging threat of the Second World War forced the United States to agree to a compromise solution. The US negotiated an agreement with President Manuel Avila Camacho that amounted to a military alliance.

=== Intervention ends in Latin America ===
Small-scale military interventions continued after 1921 as the Banana Wars tapered off. The Hoover administration began a goodwill policy and withdrew all military forces. President Roosevelt announced the "Good Neighbor Policy" by which the United States would no longer intervene to promote good government, but would accept whatever governments were locally chosen. His Secretary of State Cordell Hull endorsed article 8 of the 1933 Montevideo Convention on Rights and Duties of States; it provides that "no state has the right to intervene in the internal or external affairs of another".

=== Isolationism in 1930s ===
In the 1930s, the United States entered the period of deep isolationism, rejecting international conferences, and focusing moment mostly on reciprocal tariff agreements with smaller countries of Latin America.

=== Coming of war: 1937–1941 ===
President Roosevelt tried to avoid repeating what he saw as Woodrow Wilson's mistakes in World War I. He often made exactly the opposite decision. Wilson called for neutrality in thought and deed, while Roosevelt made it clear his administration strongly favored Britain and China. Unlike the loans in World War I, the United States made large-scale grants of military and economic aid to the Allies through Lend-Lease, with little expectation of repayment. Wilson did not greatly expand war production before the declaration of war; Roosevelt did. Wilson waited for the declaration to begin a draft; Roosevelt started one in 1940. Wilson never made the United States an official ally but Roosevelt did. Wilson never met with the top Allied leaders but Roosevelt did. Wilson proclaimed independent policy, as seen in the 14 Points, while Roosevelt always had a collaborative policy with the Allies. In 1917, United States declared war on Germany; in 1941, Roosevelt waited until the enemy attacked at Pearl Harbor. Wilson refused to collaborate with the Republicans; Roosevelt named leading Republicans to head the War Department and the Navy Department. Wilson let General John J. Pershing make the major military decisions; Roosevelt made the major decisions in his war including the "Europe first" strategy. He rejected the idea of an armistice and demanded unconditional surrender. Roosevelt often mentioned his role in the Wilson administration, but added that he had profited more from Wilson's errors than from his successes.

== World War II ==
=== Foreign and military policy ===
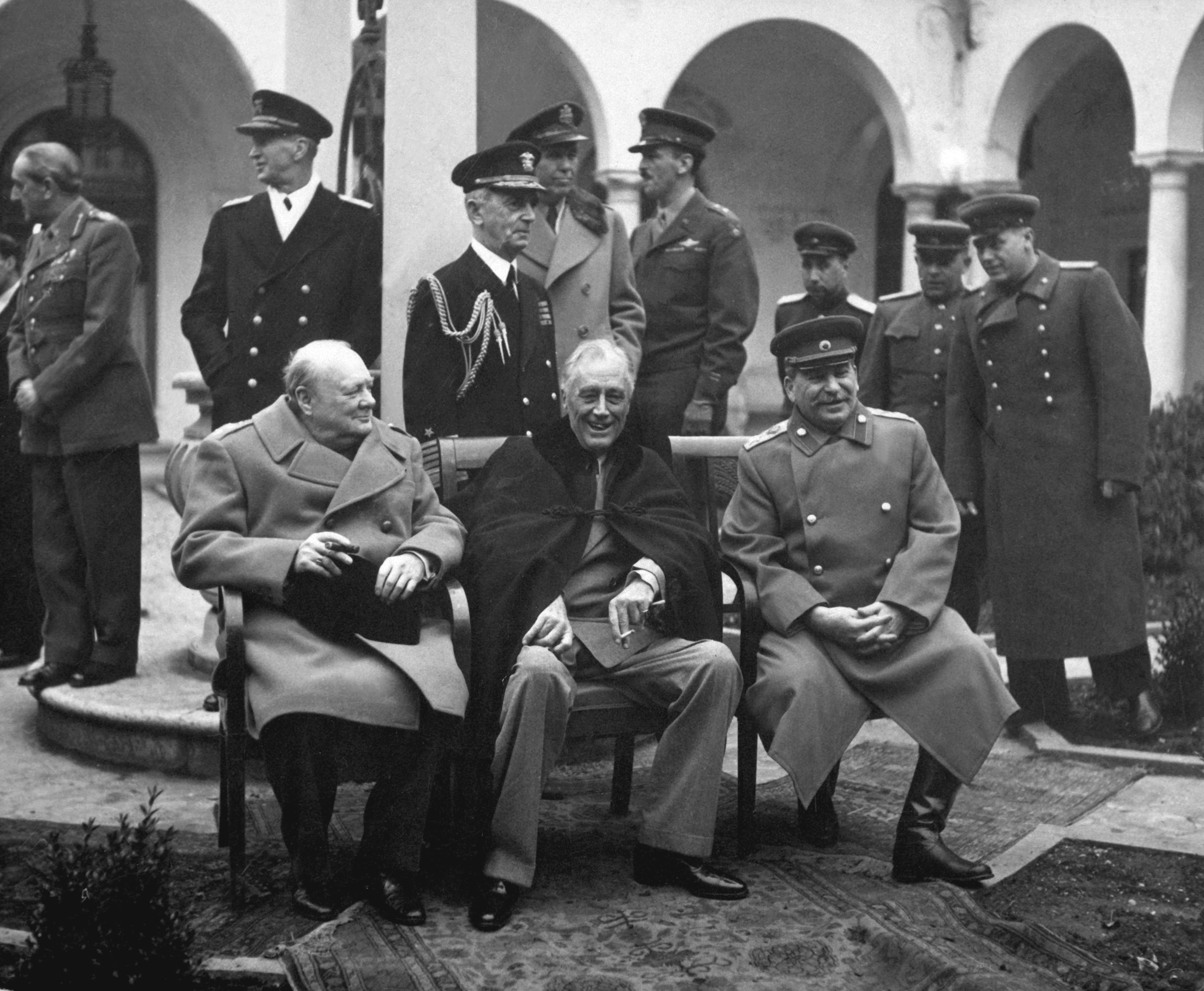
Big Three in Yalta formed U.K. Prime Minister Winston Churchill, U.S. President Franklin D. Roosevelt and the Soviet Leader Joseph Stalin led the Allies against the Axis centered on Nazi Germany.

Isolationist sentiment with regard to foreign wars in America had ebbed, but the United States at first declined to enter the war, limiting itself to giving supplies and weapons via Lend Lease to Britain, China, and the Soviet Union. American feeling changed drastically with the sudden Japanese attack on Pearl Harbor. The U.S. enthusiastically went to war against Japan, Italy, and Nazi Germany. Italy surrendered in 1943, followed by Germany and Japan in 1945. The United States was one of the "Allied Big Four", alongside the United Kingdom, Soviet Union, and China. The U.S. emerged relatively unscathed from the war, with even greater economic and military influence. The economy doubled and tripled in size as a massive industrial mobilization was accompanied by artificial wage and price controls. 16 million men entered the military (most were drafted), in addition to 300,000 women volunteers. After a series of defeats inflicted by Japan, the U.S. Navy turned the tide at Midway (June 1942), then inexorably moved toward total destruction of the Japanese military. After small-scale invasions of North Africa (1942) and Italy (1943), the main American effort was a strategic bombing campaign that destroyed the German Luftwaffe, followed by a massive invasion of France in 1944. American forces met up with Soviet forces marching into Germany from the east in May 1945. Overall, the entire nation was turned into a vast war machine, affecting society more than any other conflict fought by the United States, except perhaps the Civil War.

After winning re-election to unprecedented third and fourth terms, Roosevelt's health was rapidly deteriorating; he died on April 12, 1945. Harry S. Truman had not been kept informed of major foreign policy and military decisions, but he continued most of Roosevelt's wartime policies. Truman moved sharply to the right in replacing FDR's liberal cabinet.

With its merchant fleet sunk by American submarines, Japan ran short of aviation gasoline and fuel oil. The U.S. Navy in June 1944 captured islands within bombing range of Tokyo. Strategic bombing using the B-29 destroyed all the major cities in 1945, as the U.S. captured Iwo Jima and Okinawa after heavy losses. With conventional and atomic bombs falling, an Allied invasion imminent, and an unexpected Soviet attack sweeping through Manchuria, the Emperor of Japan surrendered. Japan was occupied by the Americans under Douglas MacArthur; MacArthur's five year rule transformed Japan's government, society and economy along American lines into a peaceful democracy and a close ally of the U.S.

=== Homefront ===
==== Economics ====
The main contributions of the U.S. to the Allied war effort comprised money, industrial output, food, petroleum, technological innovation, and (especially 1944–45), soldiers. Much of the focus in Washington was maximizing the economic output of the nation. The overall result was a dramatic increase in GDP, the export of vast quantities of supplies to the Allies and to American forces overseas, the end of unemployment, and a rise in civilian consumption even as 40% of the GDP went to the war effort. This was achieved by tens of millions of workers moving from low-productivity occupations to high efficiency jobs, improvements in productivity through better technology and management, and the move into the active labor force of students, retired people, housewives, and the unemployed, and an increase in hours worked. It was exhausting; leisure activities declined sharply. People tolerated the extra work because of patriotism, the pay, and the confidence it was only "for the duration" and life would return to normal as soon as the war was won. Most durable goods became unavailable, and meat, clothing, and gasoline was tightly rationed. In industrial areas housing was in short supply as people doubled up and lived in cramped quarters. Prices and wages were controlled, and Americans saved a high portion of their incomes, which led to renewed growth after the war instead of a return to depression.

==== Taxes and controls ====
Federal tax policy was highly contentious during the war, with President Franklin D. Roosevelt battling a conservative Congress. Everyone agreed on the need for high taxes to pay for the war. Roosevelt tried unsuccessfully to impose a 100% tax on incomes over $25,000 (equal to $465,144 today), while Congress enlarged the base downward. By 1944 nearly every employed person was paying federal income taxes (compared to 10% in 1940).

Many controls were put on the economy. The most important were price controls, imposed on most products and monitored by the Office of Price Administration. Wages were also controlled. Corporations dealt with numerous agencies, especially the War production Board (WPB), and the War and Navy departments, which had the purchasing power and priorities that largely reshaped and expanded industrial production.

==== Rationing ====
In 1942 a rationing system was begun to guarantee minimum amounts of necessities to everyone (especially poor people) and prevent inflation. Tires were the first item to be rationed in January 1942 because supplies of natural rubber were interrupted. Gasoline rationing proved an even better way to allocate scarce rubber. By 1943 one needed government issued ration coupons to purchase typewriters, sugar, gasoline, bicycles, footwear, fuel oil, silk, nylon, coffee, stoves, shoes, meat, cheese, butter, margarine, canned foods, dried fruits, jam, and many other items. Some items—like new automobiles and appliances—were no longer made. The rationing system did not apply to used goods (like clothes or cars). The ration system was complex and confusing, but high levels of patriotism made it acceptable as people helped each other through the maze of rules.

To get a classification and a book of rationing stamps, one had to appear before a local rationing board. Each person in a household received a ration book, including babies and children. When purchasing gasoline, a driver had to present a gas card along with a ration book and cash. Ration stamps were valid only for a set period to forestall hoarding. All forms of automobile racing were banned, including the Indianapolis 500. Sightseeing driving was banned, too.

People had more money than they could spend, so they saved it, especially in government savings bonds. Bond rallies in many cities featured Hollywood film stars, who drew in the crowds needed to make the program a success. The buyer paid 3/4 of the face value of a war bond, and received the full face value back after a set number of years. Workers were challenged to put "at least 10% of every paycheck into Bonds". Compliance was very high, with entire factories of workers earning a special "Minuteman" flag to fly over their plant if all workers belonged to the "Ten Percent Club". There were seven major War Loan drives, all of which exceeded their goals. An added advantage was that citizens who were putting their money into War Bonds were not putting it into the home front wartime economy.

==== Work force ====
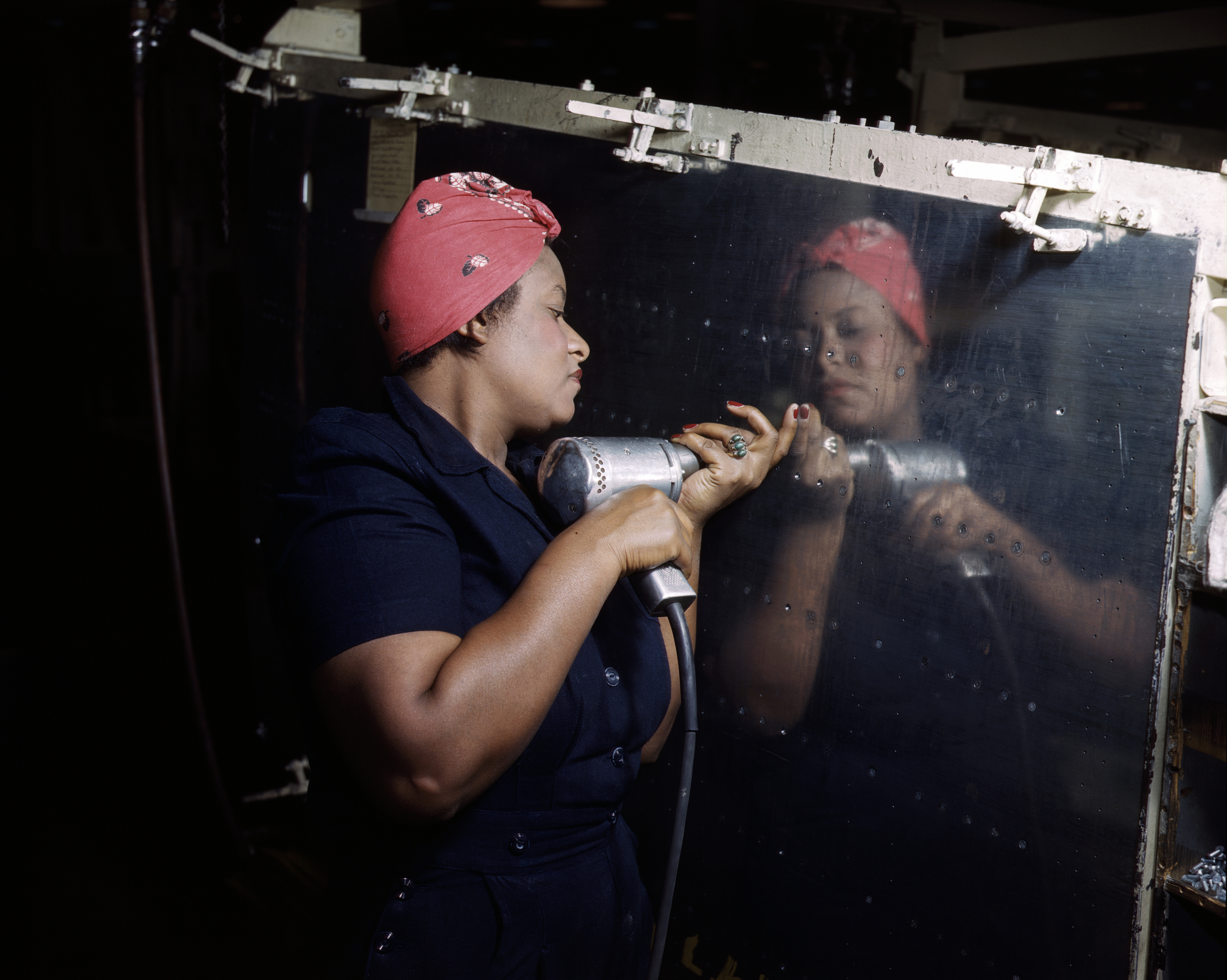
A "Rosie the Riveter", working on an A-31 "Vengeance" dive bomber, Tennessee, 1943

The unemployment problem ended in the United States with the beginning of World War II, when stepped up wartime production created millions of new jobs and the draft pulled young men out of the labor pool.

Women also joined the workforce to replace men who had joined the forces, though in fewer numbers. Roosevelt stated that the efforts of civilians at home to support the war through personal sacrifice was as critical to winning the war as the efforts of the soldiers themselves. "Rosie the Riveter" became the symbol of women laboring in manufacturing. The war effort brought about significant changes in the role of women in society as a whole. At the end of the war, many of the munitions factories closed. Other women were replaced by returning veterans. However most women who wanted to continue working did so.

Labor shortages were felt in agriculture, even though most farmers were given an occupational exemption and few were drafted. Large numbers volunteered or moved to cities for factory jobs. At the same time many agricultural commodities were in greater demand by the military and for the civilian populations of Allies. In some areas schools were temporarily closed at harvest time to enable students to work. About 400,000 German prisoners of war were used as farm laborers both during and immediately after the war.

With the war's ever increasing need for able bodied men consuming America's labor force in the early 1940s, industry turned to teen-aged boys and girls to fill in as replacements. Consequently, many states had to change their child-labor laws to allow these teenagers to work. By 1943, there were almost three million American teenage boys and girls working in American fields and factories. In the process of bringing great numbers of children into the workforce, the War altered the lives of many adolescents. Lured by high wartime wages, they took jobs and forgot about their education. Between 1940 and 1944, the number of teenage workers in America increased by 1.9 million; the number attending school declined by 1.25 million.

==== Labor unions ====
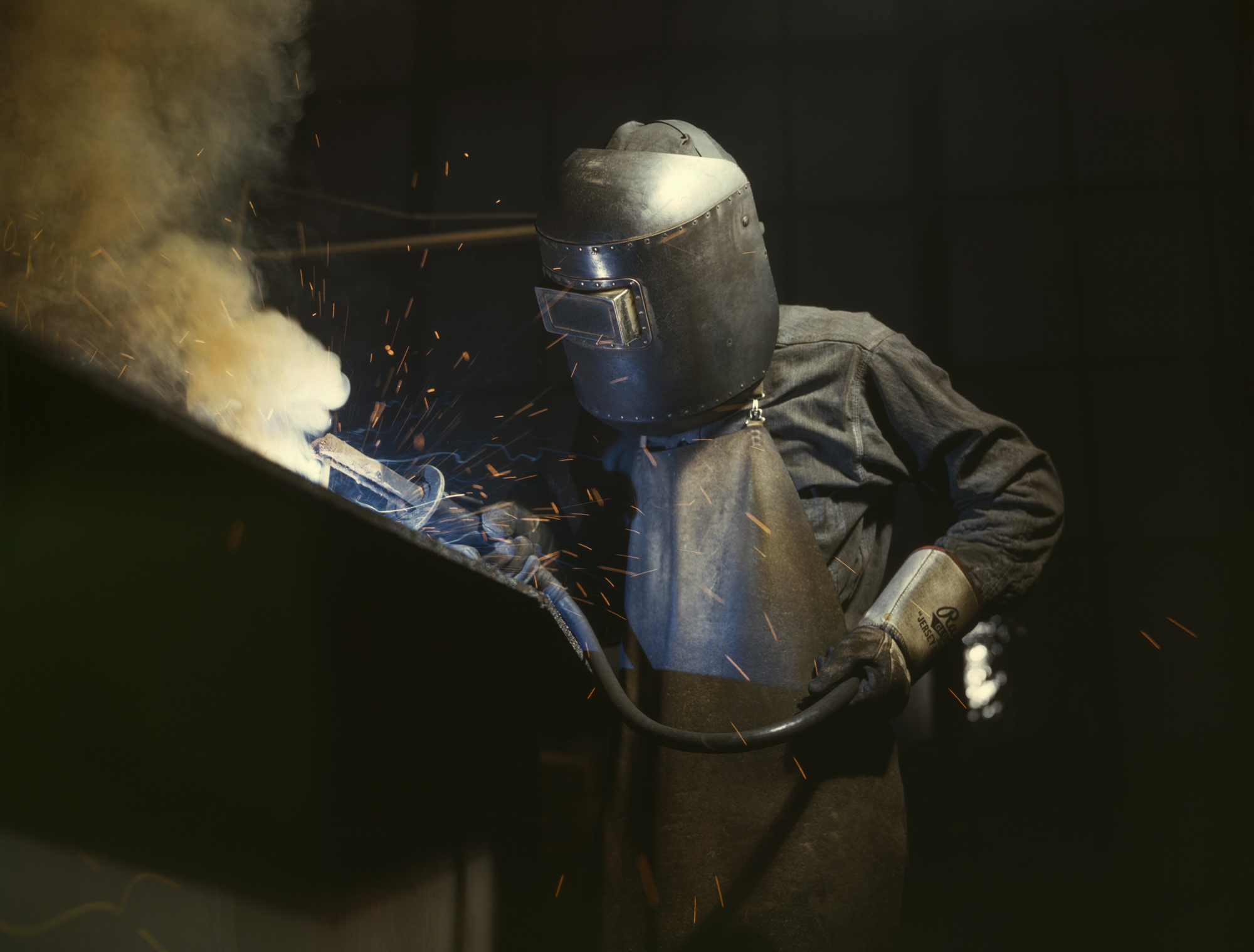
Welder making boilers for a ship, Combustion Engineering Co., Chattanooga, Tennessee, June 1942

The war mobilization changed the relationship of the Congress of Industrial Organizations (CIO) with both employers and the national government. Both the CIO and the larger American Federation of Labor (AFL) grew rapidly in the war years.

Nearly all the unions that belonged to the CIO were fully supportive of both the war effort and of the Roosevelt administration. However the United Mine Workers, who had taken an isolationist stand in the years leading up to the war and had opposed Roosevelt's reelection in 1940, left the CIO in 1942. The major unions supported a wartime no-strike pledge that aimed to eliminate not only major strikes for new contracts, but also the innumerable small strikes called by shop stewards and local union leadership to protest particular grievances. In return for labor's no-strike pledge, the government offered arbitration to determine the wages and other terms of new contracts. Those procedures produced modest wage increases during the first few years of the war but not enough to keep up with inflation, particularly when combined with the slowness of the arbitration machinery.

Even though the complaints from union members about the no-strike pledge became louder and more bitter, the CIO did not abandon it. The Mine Workers, by contrast, who did not belong to either the AFL or the CIO for much of the war, threatened numerous strikes including a successful twelve-day strike in 1943. The strikes and threats made mine leader John L. Lewis a much hated man and led to legislation hostile to unions.

All the major unions grew stronger during the war. The government put pressure on employers to recognize unions to avoid the sort of turbulent struggles over union recognition of the 1930s, while unions were generally able to obtain maintenance of membership clauses, a form of union security, through arbitration and negotiation. Workers also won benefits, such as vacation pay, that had been available only to a few in the past while wage gaps between higher skilled and less skilled workers narrowed. Most union leaders saw women as temporary wartime replacements for the men in the armed forces. It was important that the wages of these women be kept high so that the veterans would get high wages.

==== Racial tensions and Japanese American internment ====
The cities were relatively peaceful; much-feared large-scale race riots did not happen, but there were small-scale confrontations, notably the 1943 race riot in Detroit and the anti-Mexican Zoot Suit Riots in Los Angeles in 1943. Some German and Italian individuals were rounded up and interned as enemy aliens who lacked U.S. citizenship and were known by the FBI as supporters of the enemy. On February 19, 1942, President Roosevelt signed Executive Order 9066, following claims by California Attorney General Earl Warren and General John L. DeWitt that Japanese-Americans had engaged in pro-Japanese espionage against the U.S. Government. As a result, around 100,000 persons of Japanese ancestry on the West Coast and their children were interned by the U.S. government and sent to inland camps. The 100,000 or more Japanese Americans in Hawaii were not interned. The American camps were closed in February 1945.

== End of an era ==
1945 marked the end of an era. In foreign policy the United Nations was established on October 24, 1945, to serve as a world body to help prevent future world wars. By a vote of 65 to 7, the United States Senate, on December 4, 1945, approved the treaty that set full American participation in the UN, with a veto in the all-important Security Council. This marked a turn away from the traditional interest in strategic local concerns of the U.S. and toward more international involvement.

Fears of a postwar depression did not materialize, thanks in part to the large stock of savings that paid for the pent-up demands for housing, cars, new clothes—and babies. The Baby Boom began as the veterans returned, many moving to the rapidly expanding suburbs. Optimism was the hallmark of the new age—an age of grand expectations.

== See also ==
- History of the United States (1945–1964)
- Attacks on the United States (1900–1945)
- Liberalism in the United States
- Timeline of the history of the United States (1900–1929)
- Timeline of the history of the United States (1930–1949)
- Great Depression in the United States
  - Timeline of the Great Depression
  - Causes of the Great Depression
  - Wall Street Crash of 1929
- Presidency of Woodrow Wilson
- Presidency of Warren G. Harding
- Presidency of Calvin Coolidge
- Presidency of Herbert Hoover
- New Deal, under Franklin Roosevelt
- Presidency of Franklin D. Roosevelt, first and second terms
- Presidency of Franklin D. Roosevelt, third and fourth terms
- Timeline of the Franklin D. Roosevelt presidency
