= In the Pink =

In the Pink may refer to:

- In the Pink (film), a 1967 cartoon in The Pink Panther series
- In the Pink (James Galway and Henry Mancini album), 1984
- In the Pink (Donna Lewis album), 2008
- In the Pink, a 1996 compilation album by The Psychedelic Furs
- In The Pink (group), an a cappella group from Oxford University
- "In the Pink", a business-related game run by the Financial Times
- In The Pink, a 2019 short film directed by Buğra Mert Alkayalar

== See also ==
- In the Pink of the Night, a 1969 cartoon in the Pink Panther series
