= Integra =

Integra may refer to:

== Businesses ==
- Integra Air, a Canadian airline
- Integra Bank, a regional bank headquartered in Evansville, Indiana
- Integra Home Theater, a premium audio video components manufacturer
- Integra Signum, a (defunct) Swiss railroad signaling company
- Integra Telecom, an American telecommunications company
- Integra Technologies, an American outsourced semiconductor assembly And test (OSAT) service provider in Wichita, Kansas
- Integra LifeSciences, an American medical device company

== Fictional characters ==
- Integra Hellsing, a main character of the manga and anime series Hellsing
- Integra Martel, a character of the anime series Solty Rei

== Other uses ==
- Integra, the journal of Intertel, a high-IQ society
- Honda Integra, a compact car

== See also ==
- Integral (disambiguation)
