= Integration (tax) =

Integration is a feature of tax systems that apply the same effective tax rate to income no matter whether it is taxed inside the corporation or given to shareholders to be taxed as personal income. Integration may be partial or complete. Complete integration would treat corporate income as flowing through to shareholders, while partial integration only treats some income—often from dividends—this way. Integration systems have been implemented, often in the form of a dividend tax credit, in many national tax systems.

== Forms ==
Integration may be partial or complete. Complete integration occurs when a corporation functions, for tax purposes, as a flow-through entity: all income received by the corporation, whether retained by it or distributed to shareholders, would be treated as shareholders' income. In such a system, according to Sijbren Cnossen, all corporate tax would be treated like a prepayment of individual income tax for which shareholders would be credited on their personal tax returns—regardless of whether property was transferred to them in the relevant taxation period. Partial integration, by contrast, occurs when only some corporate income, often that which is distributed to shareholders as a dividend, is treated as "flowing through" the corporation. Glenn Hubbard describes such a system as "any plan in which corporate income is taxed only once, rather than taxed both when earned and when distributed to shareholders as dividends".

There are several ways to achieve partial or full integration. Full integration could be achieved by ending corporate tax, thereby treating all corporate income as shareholders' income by implication. Alternatively, dividend tax might be eliminated, thereby treating all corporate income as income to the corporation instead. Partial integration focused on dividends may occur when shareholders receive a tax credit on dividend income intended to factor in the tax already paid by the corporation on the amount distributed as a dividend.

== Implementation ==
Historically, both the United States and United Kingdom had tax systems integrated to varying degrees. In the UK, as early as 1799, a corporation could claim a tax deduction from its income because shareholders were taxed on dividend distributions. As of the mid-19th century, federal tax law in the US allowed shareholders to exclude dividends from their income because it was taxed at the corporate level.

By 1979, Canada, Japan, Germany, and France, as well as the UK, had implemented partial integration through a dividend tax credit: shareholders who received dividends could claim a credit on their tax returns corresponding to income tax already paid by the corporation on the amount distributed. Canada adopted its first form of integration in 1972, following recommendations by the Carter commission, a royal commission chaired by Kenneth Carter which delivered its report in 1966. New Zealand enacted a form of integration in 1988. As of the 1990s, "most industrialized nations" had implemented some form of integration.

Although it had earlier employed a partial integration system, federal taxation in the US by the end of World War II was not integrated: corporate income was taxed under the undistributed profits tax, under an additional tax on corporate income, and as dividend income to shareholders. From the 1970s to the 1990s, proposals for integrating the US tax system were floated but did not become law.

== Works cited ==
- Bank, Steven A. (29 September 2011). Anglo-American Corporate Taxation: Tracing the Common Roots of Divergent Approaches. Cambridge University Press. doi:10.1017/cbo9781139013284. ISBN 978-0-521-88776-2. S2CID 152719785.
- Bittker, Boris I. (1968). "Income Tax Reform in Canada: The Report of the Royal Commission on Taxation". University of Chicago Law Review. 35 (4): 637–659. doi:10.2307/1598880. hdl:20.500.13051/1732. JSTOR 1598880.
- Carlson, George (1979). "International Aspects of Corporate-Shareholder Tax Integration". Case Western Reserve Journal of International Law. 11 (3): 535–557. ISSN 0008-7254.
- Cnossen, Sijbren (2015). "What Kind of Corporation Tax Regime?". Osgoode Hall Law Journal. 52 (2): 513–551. ISSN 0030-6185.
- Gravelle, Jane (1994). The Economic Effects of Taxing Capital Income. MIT Press. ISBN 0-262-07158-4. OCLC 30154253.
- Hubbard, R. Glenn (February 1993). "Corporate Tax Integration: A View from the Treasury Department". Journal of Economic Perspectives. 7 (1): 115–132. doi:10.1257/jep.7.1.115. ISSN 0895-3309.
- Schulman, Craig T.; Thomas, Deborah W.; Sellers, Keith F.; Kennedy, Duane B. (March 1996). "Effects of Tax Integration and Capital Gains Tax on Corporate Leverage". National Tax Journal. 49 (1): 31–54. doi:10.1086/NTJ41789184. ISSN 0028-0283. S2CID 14736575.
