= Jeanne Galway =

American flutist

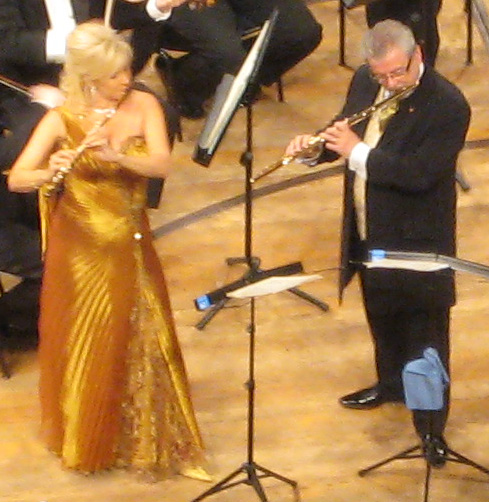
- Jeanne and James Galway performing at the 2007 New Year's Eve concert at Culture and Convention Centre, Lucerne

Background information
- Born: October 8, 1955 (age 70); Long Island, New York, U.S.
- Occupation: Flutist
- Years active: 1977–present
- Labels: RCA Victor, Crossbow Krantz
- Website: jeannegalway.com

Jeanne, Lady Galway (née Cinnante; born October 8, 1955) is an American-born concert flutist who lives in Switzerland. She is married to Irish flutist Sir James Galway. They often tour as a pair.

== Biography ==
Jeanne Cinnante was born and raised in and around Long Island, New York. She started playing the flute when she was 10 and said she had to purchase her own flutes with babysitting money. She graduated in 1973 from John Glenn High School in Elwood, Suffolk County, New York, then attended Mannes College of Music in New York City.

She met James Galway in 1982 and they dated for two years before marrying in 1984. She did not perform between 1984 and 1992 due to the stress of traveling and supporting her husband on tour, and managing his business affairs. They now travel and perform together. In addition to performing with her husband, she sometimes performs as a solo artist or as part of the trio Zephyr (with pianist Jonathan Feldman and cellist Darrett Adkins). She teaches and actively supports music education.

In 2008, Irish America magazine awarded James and Jeanne Galway the "Spirit of Ireland" award in recognition of their roles as musical ambassadors.

James and Jeanne Galway live in Lucerne, Switzerland. She performs on an 18 carat, James Galway-edition gold Nagahara flute. Her husband no longer performs with anyone else.

== Discography ==
- "My Magic Flute" with James Galway and Sinfonia Varsovia
