= James Galway =

Irish flute player (born 1939)

Sir James Galway OBE
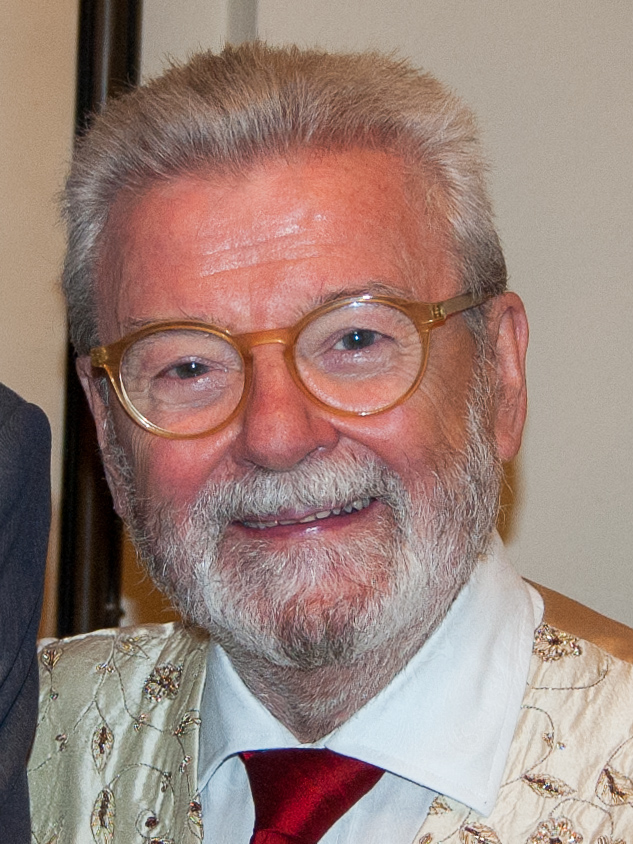
- Galway in 2013

Background information
- Born: 8 December 1939 (age 86); Belfast, Northern Ireland
- Genres: Classical, Celtic, pop
- Occupation: Flute player
- Years active: 1950s–present
- Labels: RCA Red Seal, Deutsche Grammophon/Universal Classics
- Spouse: Jeanne, Lady Galway
- Website: www.jamesgalway.com

Sir James Galway OBE (born 8 December 1939) is an Irish virtuoso flute player from Belfast, nicknamed "The Man with the Golden Flute". After several years working as an orchestral musician, he established an international career as a solo flute player. In 2005, he received the Brit Award for Outstanding Contribution to Music at the Classic Brit Awards.

== Early life ==
Galway was born in North Belfast as one of two brothers. His father, who played the flute, was employed at the Harland & Wolff shipyard until the end of the Second World War and spent night-shifts cleaning buses after the war, while his mother, a pianist, was a winder in a flax-spinning mill. Raised as a Presbyterian and surrounded by a tradition of flute bands and many friends and family members who played the instrument, he was taught the flute by his uncle at the age of nine and joined his fife and drum corps. At the age of eleven Galway won the junior, senior, and open Belfast flute Championships in a single day. His first instrument was a five-key Irish flute, and at the age of twelve or thirteen, he received a Boehm instrument.

== Education and career ==
Galway was educated at Mountcollyer Secondary Modern School in Belfast. He left school at the age of fourteen and worked as an apprentice to a piano repairer for two years.

He subsequently studied the flute at the Royal College of Music under John Francis and at the Guildhall School of Music under Geoffrey Gilbert. He then briefly studied at the Paris Conservatoire under Gaston Crunelle. While in Paris, he asked for lessons from the celebrated French flute player Jean-Pierre Rampal, who offered him advice on his playing, but felt he was already too good a flute player to need lessons from either Rampal or the conservatory. He left Paris to take up his first orchestral flute-playing job at Sadler's Wells Opera in London.

He went on to spend fifteen years as an orchestral player. In addition to Sadler's Wells, he played with Covent Garden Opera, the London Symphony Orchestra and the Royal Philharmonic Orchestra. He auditioned for the Berlin Philharmonic Orchestra under Herbert von Karajan and was principal flute in the orchestra from 1969 to 1975. To Karajan's surprise and dismay, after a period of some disagreement, Galway decided that he would leave to pursue a solo career.

In 1982 Galway was the featured guest star on the Andy Williams Early New England Christmas special, broadcast on CBS.

In addition to his performances of the standard classical repertoire, he features contemporary music in his programmes, including new flute works commissioned by and for him by composers including David Amram, Malcolm Arnold, William Bolcom, John Corigliano, John Wolf Brennan, Dave Heath, Lowell Liebermann and Joaquín Rodrigo. The album James Galway and The Chieftains in Ireland by Galway and The Chieftains reached number 32 in the UK Albums Chart in 1987.

Galway still performs regularly and is one of the world's best-known flute players. His recordings have sold over 30 million copies.

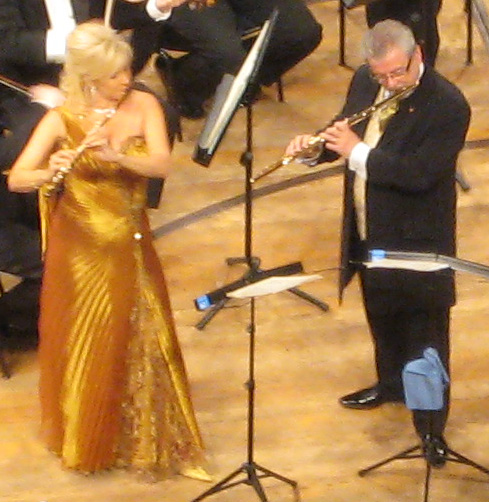
Galway and his wife Jeanne at the 2007 New Year's Eve concert at Culture and Convention Centre, Lucerne

In 1990, he was invited by Roger Waters to play at The Wall – Live in Berlin concert, held in Potsdamer Platz; he played Pink Floyd's songs "Goodbye Blue Sky" and "Is There Anybody Out There?". Galway performed for the Academy Award-winning ensemble recording the soundtracks of Peter Jackson's The Lord of the Rings film trilogy, composed by Howard Shore. In June 2008, he was inducted into the Hollywood Bowl Hall of Fame along with Liza Minnelli and B. B. King.

He performs on Nagahara flutes, as well as some Muramatsu Flutes. Conn-Selmer produces his line of flutes, "Galway Spirit Flutes".

Galway is president of Flutewise, a global charitable organisation that supports young flute players, run by Liz Goodwin. In 2003 he formed the Music Education Consortium together with Julian Lloyd Webber, Evelyn Glennie, and Michael Kamen to pressure the British Government into providing better music education in schools. He has been an Ambassador for the National Foundation for Youth Music, a UK charity.

He was appointed an Officer of the Order of the British Empire (OBE) in the 1977 Silver Jubilee and Birthday Honours, and was knighted for services to music in the 2001 Birthday Honours, the first wind player ever to receive that honour.

Galway is a National Patron of Delta Omicron, an international professional music fraternity, and an ambassador of the UK charity Help Musicians.

In December 2013, Galway launched First Flute, an online interactive series of lessons for beginning flute students of all ages.

He received the 2014 Gramophone Lifetime Achievement Award.

== Personal life ==
Galway has been married three times. His first marriage, to a French woman, produced a son. He married his second wife, Anna (Annie) Renggli, a daughter of a well-known Swiss architect, in 1972; they moved from Berlin to Lucerne, Switzerland, Anna's hometown. The couple had twin daughters and a son. In 1978 he recorded an instrumental version of John Denver's "Annie's Song" for her. It peaked at no. 3 in the UK Singles Chart.

After this divorce, he moved to Meggen, Switzerland, a village next to Lucerne, where he resides now with his third wife, the American-born flute player Jeanne Galway (née Cinnante), whom he married in 1984. They often tour together, playing duets. In addition, they give masterclasses and lectures.

Galway is a devout Christian who visits various types of churches while travelling (as long as they are not – in his view – modern and "happy-clappy"), and prays before his concert performances. He also wears a cross pendant, about which he says, "It's not jewellery. It's something that reminds me of what I should be doing and how I should be behaving."

In August 1977, Galway was run over by a speeding motorcycle in Lucerne, breaking his left arm and both legs and required a four-month hospital stay. He has the eye condition nystagmus, and is a patron of the Nystagmus Network, a charity that supports people with the condition. In December 2009, he fell down a flight of stairs at his home, fracturing his left wrist and breaking his right arm.

Appearing on The Nolan Show in June 2015, Galway stated that he views his national identity as Irish. He was critical of the actions of the Northern Irish government during his childhood, and singled out prominent Unionist figures such as Ian Paisley whom Galway blamed for fostering the divisions that led to The Troubles. His comments were criticised by prominent Unionist politicians, among them Sammy Wilson. Describing Northern Ireland as "the British-occupied part of Ireland", Galway further elaborated he would like "Ireland to be Ireland" and that when people ask him where he comes from he says "Ireland" and when asked if he is "Irish", he replies affirmatively. He did, however, accept substantive British honours, first an OBE, and later a knighthood.

His younger brother, George (1940–2020), was a jazz musician (clarinet, flute, and saxophone) and teacher based in Manchester, England. George's elder child and James's nephew, Martin Galway, is a musician known for his work on Commodore 64 computer game music in the 1980s.

== Discography ==
NOTE: All release dates for non-compilations below are taken from the liner notes for The Man with the Golden Flute – The Complete RCA Collection (71 CDs and 2 DVDs box set) (2014).

- Prokofiev & Franck: Sonatas for Flute and Piano (with Martha Argerich; November 1975)
- Man with the Golden Flute (with the National Philharmonic Orchestra, Charles Gerhardt, conductor; May 1976)
- Mozart: The Two Flute Concertos, Andante for Flute and Orchestra (with the Festival Strings Lucerne, Rudolf Baumgartner, conductor; March 1977)
- Vivaldi: The Four Seasons (with the Zagreb Soloists; May 1977)
- The Magic Flute of James Galway (with the New Irish Chamber Orchestra, André Prieur, conductor; March 1978)
- James Galway Plays Bach (with Zagreb Soloists, Tonko Ninić, concertmaster; September 1978)
- Annie's Song and Other Galway Favorites (with the Harp Ensemble, Marisa Robles, director; Kevin Conneff, bodhrán (Irish drum); and the National Philharmonic Orchestra, Charles Gerhardt, conductor; January 1979)
- James Galway Plays Mozart (with Marisa Robles, harp, and the London Symphony Orchestra, Eduardo Mata, conductor; May 1979)
- James Galway Plays Rodrigo (with Philharmonia Orchestra, Eduardo Mata, conductor; August 1979)
- James Galway Plays Telemann (with the Zagreb Soloists, Tonko Ninić, concertmaster; October 1979)
- Song of the Seashore and Other Melodies of Japan (with Susumu Miyashita, koto; Ayako Shinozaki, harp; and the Tokyo String Orchestra, Hiroyuki Iwaki, conductor; February 1979)
- Sometimes When We Touch (with Cleo Laine; June 1980)
- French Flute Concertos (with the Royal Philharmonic Orchestra, Charles Dutoit, conductor; October 1980)
- James Galway Plays Stamitz (with the New Irish Chamber Orchestra, André Prieur, conductor; January 1981)
- Songs of the southern cross (with The Sydney Symphony Orchestra, David Measham, conductor; 1981)
- James Galway Plays Reinecke (with Phillip Moll, piano, and the London Philharmonic Orchestra, Hiroyuki Iwaki, conductor; May 1981)
- Pachelbel Canon (June 1981)
- Galway Plays Mayer: Sri Krishna (with Phillip Moll, piano; John Mayer, tanpura; and the London Philharmonic Orchestra, Hiroyuki Iwaki, conductor; 1981)
- Bach: Trio Sonatas (with Kyung-wha Chung, violin; Phillip Moll, harpsichord; and Moray Welsh, cello continuo; February 1982)
- The Wayward Wind (September 1982)
- Mozart: The Two Flute Concertos (with the New Irish Chamber Orchestra, André Prieur, conductor; October 1982)
- Nocturne (August 1983)
- James Galway Plays Schubert (with Phillip Moll, piano; August 1984)
- In the Pink (with Henry Mancini, conductor; August 1984)
- Lennox Berkeley -- The Complete Works for Flute (April 1985)
- Vivaldi: 6 concerti opus 10 (with Malcolm Proud, harpsichord, and the New Irish Chamber Orchestra; April 1985)
- Phoenix -- Australian Flute Concertos (April 1985)
- James Galway Plays Khachaturian (with the Royal Philharmonic Orchestra, Myung-whun Chung, conductor; October 1985)
- Clair de lune (with Marisa Robles, harp, and the Chamber Orchestra of Europe; April 1986)
- James Galway's Christmas Carol (August 1986)
- Italian Serenade (with Kazuhito Yamashita; October 1986)
- In Ireland (with The Chieftains; January 1987)
- James Galway Plays Nielsen (May 1987)
- John Corigliano: Pied Piper Fantasy (October 1987)
- Mercadante: Concertos for Flute and Orchestra (April 1988)
- Sonatas by Dvorak, Feld, and Martinu (September 1988)
- James Galway Plays Mozart (2-CD set) (with Marisa Robles, harp, and the Chamber Orchestra of Europe; December 1988)
- Vivaldi: 6 Concertos (with I Solisti Veneti, Claudio Scimone, conductor; September 1989)
- James Galway Plays Beethoven (February 1990)
- The Enchanted Forest – Melodies of Japan (with Hiro Fujikake; March 1990)
- Over the Sea to Skye -- The Celtic Connection (with The Chieftains; January 1991)
- C.P.E. Bach: 3 Concertos (August 1990)
- Quantz: 4 Concertos (March 1991)
- In Dulci Jubilo: Christmas with James Galway (August 1991)
- The Wind Beneath my Wings (September 1991)
- James Galway, Kazuhito Yamashita, and Joseph Swensen Play Giuliani (with Kazuhito Yamashita, guitar, and Joseph Swensen, violin; July 1992)
- J.S. Bach: Suite No. 2; Concerto for Flute, Violin and Harpsichord (July 1992)
- Beauty and the Beast: Galway at the Movies (July 1992)
- Italian Flute Concertos (July 1993)
- Mozart Flute Quartets (with the Tokyo String Quartet) (1993)
- The Lark in the Clear Air (July 1994)
- Mozart: Concerto for Flute and Harp, K. 299; Sonatas for Flute and Piano, K. 296 and K. 376 (with Marisa Robles; July 1993)
- Danzi (with Sabine Meyer, clarinet; July 1994)
- Wind of Change (July 1994)
- Bach Sonatas (February 1995)
- Bach, Vol. 2: Trio Sonatas (with Monica Huggett, violin; Jeanne Galway, flute; Phillip Moll, harpsichord; and Sarah Cunningham, viola da gamba; October 1996)
- The French Recital (with Christopher O'Riley, piano; July 1995)
- The Celtic Minstrel (with The Chieftains July 1995)
- Mozart: Concerto for Flute and Harp; Concerto No. 1 and Concerto No. 2 (with Marisa Robles, harp, and Academy of St Martin in the Fields with Neville Marriner, conductor; October 1996)
- Legends (with Phil Coulter, piano; February 1997)
- James Galway Plays the Music of Sir Malcolm Arnold (with Phillip Moll, piano, and Academy of St Martin in the Fields with Neville Marriner, conductor; October 1997)
- Music for my Friends (with Phillip Moll, piano, and Jeanne Galway, flute; December 1997)
- Winter's Crossing (with Phil Coulter, piano, and Liam Neeson, narrator; August 1998)
- James Galway Plays Lowell Liebermann (with Hyun-sun Na, harp, and the London Mozart Players with Lowell Liebermann, conductor; 1997)
- Tango Del Fuego (February 1999)
- Un-Break my Heart (with Jeanne Galway, flute; September 1999)
- Hommage à Rampal (with Jeanne Galway, flute, and the London Mozart Players; October 1999)
- Music for my Little Friends (with Phillip Moll, piano, and the London Mozart Players; May 2002)
- A Song of Home: An Irish American Musical Journey (with Jay Ungar, fiddle; Molly Mason, guitar, piano, and vocals; Peter Ostroushko, mandolin and guitar; Steve Rust, bass; Ruth Ungar, harmony vocals; and Michael Merenda, shaker; September 2003)
- O'Reilly Street (with Tiempo Libre; August 2008)
- James Galway and The Chieftains -- In Ireland (DVD, 1991)
- Dudley Moore Introduces Concerto! Mozart: Concerto for Flute and Harp (DVD) (with Marisa Robles, harp, and the London Symphony Orchestra. Michael Tilson Thomas, conductor; 1993)

Compilations:

- Greatest Hits (1988)
- The Concerto Collection (1990)
- Greatest Hits Vol. 2 (1992)
- The Essential James Galway (2-CD compilation)
- The Classical James Galway (1993)
- Greatest Hits Vol. 3 (1998)
- Sixty Years – Sixty Flute Masterpieces Collection (1999)
- The Very Best of James Galway (2002)
- The Essential James Galway (2006)
- Vivaldi – Concerti for Flute (DVD) (2008)
- Celebrating 70: A Collection of Personal Favorites (2009)
- James Galway Plays Flute Concertos (12-CD box set) (2011)
- The Man with the Golden Flute – The Complete RCA Collection (71 CDs and 2 DVDs box set) (2014)

== Media ==
Flute Quintet in G major by Bernhard Romberg
1. Allegro

2. Minuet

3. Adagio

4. Rondo
performed by James Galway with the Young Danish String Quartet, November 2005

Wind Quintet Op. 43 by Carl Nielsen
1. Allegro ben moderato

2. Menuetto

3. Praeludium: Adagio. Tema con variazioni: Un poco andantino
performed by James Galway with the Carion quintet
