= List of Coppelion chapters =

Coppelion (コッペリオン, Kopperion) is a Japanese seinen manga series written and illustrated by Tomonori Inoue. The story follows three high school girls who were genetically engineered to be impervious to radioactivity and sent to Tokyo after the city was contaminated by a nuclear accident.

Coppelion began its serialization in Young Magazine from 2008 to May 7, 2012, before moving to Monthly Young Magazine from 2012 to 2016. The series has currently been collected into twenty-four volumes by Kodansha. Coppelion Vol. 3 made it to the Oricon best seller chart at number 29 during the week of April 7, 2009. While the manga has yet to be available in print form in North America, it is currently available in English as part of a read-only/download-only subscription from Crunchyroll and Kodansha.

== List of chapters ==
No.	Release date	ISBN
01	October 6, 2008	978-4-06-375572-5
001. "#1"; 002. "#2"; 003. "#3"; 004. "#4"; 005. "#5"; 006. "#6"; 007. "#7"; 008. "#8"
02	January 6, 2009	978-4-06-361749-8
009. "#9"; 010. "#10"; 011. "#11"; 012. "#12"; 013. "#13"; 014. "#14"; 015. "#15"; 016. "#16"; 017. "#17"
03	April 6, 2009	978-4-06-361775-7
018. "#18"; 019. "#19"; 020. "#20"; 021. "#21"; 022. "Ghosts of the JGSDF"; 023. "Perilous Flight"; 024. "The Prime Minister Arrives!"; 025. "Full Speed to JAXA!"; 026. "Planet"
04	July 6, 2009	978-4-06-361807-5
027. "Intruders"; 028. "The Ghosts's Nest"; 029. "The Cleanup Crew"; 030. "One Tokyo Night"; 031. "The Water Plant"; 032. "Operation: Rescue Aoi"; 033. "Save Ibara!"; 034. "The 1st Division's Secret"; 035. "Emergency"; 036. "Kanpachi Blockade"
05	October 10, 2009	978-4-06-361830-3
037. "The Ozu Sisters"; 038. "Bad Genes"; 039. "Clash!!"; 040. "Take Down the Ozu Sisters"; 041. "Dolls"; 042. "The Wind of Death"; 043. "Nature's Wrath"; 044. "Musashino Railway!"; 045. "Taeko's Decision"; 046. "The Last Supper"
06	January 6, 2010	978-4-06-361857-0
047. "The Keepsake Photo"; 048. "Connected"; 049. "The Battle Begins!"; 050. "The Battle at Inogashira Park"; 051. "Atoms for Peace"; 052. "Swan Boat, Full Speed"; 053. "Human history"; 054. "Haruto's gun"; 055. "The 1st Division's Counterattack"; 056. "The Iron Spider"
07	May 6, 2010	978-4-06-361890-7
057. "All-out War"; 058. "Victims of Science"; 059. "Open Sesame"; 060. "Decisive Move"; 061. "Tower of The Sun"; 062. "Run, Haruto"; 063. "The Broken Cog"; 064. "The Final Countdown"; 065. "The Cross to Bear"; 066. "The Last Aether"; 067. "Ibara's Path"
08	September 6, 2010	978-4-06-361930-0
068. "A Noble Death"; 069. "No Future For Us"; 070. "All Aboard!"; 071. "Angel in the Rubble"; 072. "Dry Your tears"; 073. "A White World"; 074. "To the Inner City"; 075. "Marionette"; 076. "Steel Strings"; 077. "Battel at Koenji"
09	January 6, 2011	978-4-06-361992-8
078. "Resolution"; 079. "The City Lights"; 080. "Last Stop, Shinjuku"; 081. "Smiling in the Morning Sun"; 082. "The Girl in the Forest"; 083. "The Most Dangerous Radiation"; 084. "The Walking Reactor"; 085. "Bug"; 086. "The Collapse of Shinjuku"; 087. "Underground Promenade"
10	May 5, 2011	978-4-06-382027-0
088. "Pursuer"; 089. "Underground Monster"; 090. "Grotesque Truth"; 091. "Chimera"; 092. "Flight Down Meiji Street"; 093. "The Master Of City Hall"; 094. "Dr. Coppelius"; 095. "Wandering Sand"; 096. "Reload"; 097. "Takeshita Street"
11	August 5, 2011	978-4-06-382062-1
098. "Parallel World"; 099. "The Underground Paradise"; 100. "Festival Night"; 101. "To The World Above"; 102. "The Riddle Of Dr. Coppelius"; 103. "The Next Trial"; 104. "After That Rabbit"; 105. "Monument of Death"; 106. "Fossil Display"; 107. "Fossiloid"; 108. "The True Enemy"
12	November 4, 2011	978-4-06-382095-9
109. "The Men's Decision"; 110. "3D Labyrinth"; 111. "Ideology"; 112. "On the Trail! Battle on the Web"; 113. "Problem on the Nagoya Front"; 114. "The Evil Wizard"; 115. "Red Wings, To the East"; 116. "Inferno"; 117. "The Empty Girl"; 118. "The Magic Drug"
13	February 6, 2012	978-4-06-382131-4
119. "The Flowers of Evil"; 120. "Blitz! Battle to the Limit"; 121. "Clone Original"; 122. "Heaven and Hell"; 123. "The Magic Finger"; 124. "Original vs. Copy"; 125. "Reunion in the Old Capital"; 126. "Nuclear Gateway"; 127. "Humanity's Dream"; 128. "One Hell of a Ride in the City of Death!"; 129. "The Original's Obstacle"
14	May 5, 2012	978-4-06-382170-3
130. "The Path of Destruction"; 131. "Melancholia's Magic Square"; 132. "Guardian Angel"; 133. "Izanami's Rebellion"; 134. "Neuro Balancer"; 135. "Destroyer of Worlds"; 136. "Ikebukuro's Flying Monster"; 137. "Help Me, Ibara!"; 138. "Fire of the Heart"; 139. "Constitutional Reform!"
15	August 6, 2012	978-4-06-382203-8
140. "First Feelings"; 141. "High Speed! Expressway Battle"; 142. "Arms Dealer"; 143. "Technology of the Future"; 144. "Doll vs. Robot"; 145. "The Great Toranomon Scuffle"; 146. "The Battle on Tokyo Tower"; 147. "I'm Not a Doll!"; 148. "Mana's Arrival!"; 149. "The Hand that Bid Farewell"; 150. "Traitors"
16	November 6, 2012	978-4-06-382234-2
151. "Fireworks"; 152. "The Underwater Maze"; 153. "Infiltrating Shibuya Shopping Mall!"; 154. "Section D-2"; 155. "Intruder in the Shelter"; 156. "Time Limit"; 157. "Decryption"; 158. "Human Experimentation"; 159. "The Three Professors' Demand"; 160. "Dark Matter"; 161. "The Airship"
17	March 6, 2013	978-4-06-382259-5
162. "Battle on the Airship"; 163. "Desperate Dive"; 164. "Black Wings"; 165. "Search for an Ark"; 166. "World War"; 167. "Strategy Meeting"; 168. "Edon Type-0"; 169. "The Great Tokyo Battle!"; 170. "The Exploration Unit"; 171. "Dance of Destruction"
18	July 5, 2013	978-4-06-382316-5
172. "Yasukuni Street"; 173. "The Mystery of the Sudden Deaths"; 174. "Fate and Choice"; 175. "Passing Days"; 176. "Prometheus' Fire"; 177. "Emergency Evacuation"; 178. "Their Promise"; 179. "New Sprout"; 180. "Farewell, Shelter 109"
19	September 6, 2013	978-4-06-382353-0
181. "The Day of the Final Battle"; 182. "Take the Genryu!"; 183. "In the Silent City"; 184. "SOS! Daikanyama"; 185. "The Children of the Future"; 186. "Never-ending Battle"
20	December 6, 2013	978-4-06-382385-1
187. "The Goddess of Jiyugaoka"; 188. "The Retrieval Unit"; 189. "The little Bird in the Cage"; 190. "Truce"; 191. "Battlefield Reunion"; 192. "An Old Photo"
21	June 6, 2014	978-4-06-382475-9
193. "Haruto Returns"; 194. "To a World of Darkness"; 195. "Take Down the Black Wings"; 196. "Beneath The Masks"; 197. "Roll out!"; 198. "The Record from 2011"
22	December 5, 2014	978-4-06-382537-4
199. "Tokyo Station Showdown!"; 200. "Site - 0"; 201. "Decisive Battle in Akihabara"; 202. "Golden Ratio!"; 203. "The Switch of Destiny"; 204. "Convergence"
23	May 1, 2015	978-4-06-382604-3
205. "Spiritual Vessel"; 206. "Mana's Secret"; 207. "Took You Long Enough, VP!"; 208. "Battle against the Wall"; 209. "A Distant Promise"; 210. "Onslaught of Flame"
24	November 6, 2015	978-4-06-382699-9
211. "Words For the Future"; 212. "Whispers of Death"; 213. "Apoptosis"; 214. "Light the Fire"; 215. "Dawn"; 216. "Evacuation Complete"
25	April 6, 2016	978-4-06-382760-6
217. "Across the Bridge"; 218. "Release From Zero"; 219. "Initializer"; 220. "Castle of Sand"; 221. "Cellular Memory"
26	April 6, 2016	978-4-06-382761-3
222. "At the End of this World"; 223. "Tender Memories"; 224. "Great Collapse"; 225. "Cries of Hope"; 226. "Graduation Photo" (Last Chapter)
