= Digital integration =

Concept in digital systems

Digital integration is the idea that data or information on any given electronic device can be read or manipulated by another device using a standard format. From the digital culture perspective, on the other hand, it is defined as an organization drive to leverage the broad capabilities and vast efficiencies of digital technology and media in order to provide consumers relevance and value. It is also employed in digital governance and could refer to the inter-agency cooperation and intergovernmental collaboration across units at multiple levels of government. The phenomenon is considered a basic megatrend in the so-called knowledge civilization.

== Applications ==
=== Cell phone calendar to public digital calendar (online calendar) ===
In this example, a user has a cell phone with a calendar, as well as a calendar on the Internet. Digital Integration would allow the user to synchronize the two, and the following features could result:

- The user could plan events and have other users notified.
- If the Public Digital Calendar is integral with a Blog, then the user could write about the event in it.

=== Product development ===
Digital integration is now considered a part of product development. For instance, modeling systems aims for the digital integration of the product development chain. It is also entailed in the digital automation of product design and credited for the 30 to 45 percent increase in productivity as part of the range of digital tools employed to augment project performance.

=== Building services integration for energy management and building control ===
A home owner or commercial building manager could utilize digital integration products to connect intelligent services within a built environment.

- An intruder detection or access control system could be used in conjunction with light level sensors to turn lights on and off. So when you walk into a dark room the lights turn on (if you are allowed to be there) and when you leave they turn off behind you, thus making energy savings by preventing lights from being left on.
- The same techniques could be used to control HVAC (Heating Ventilation and Air Conditioning) systems.
- Home owners and commercial building managers can use Web based digital integration to control and manage services within their buildings via a web browser interface. The intelligent controllers in Air Conditioning units for example may be "Web Enabled" using digital integration solutions and products.

There is a growing market for these products. Many of the control systems used for security, lighting, HVAC and Fire detection do not conform to any communications protocol standard, so often interface software is used to convert the different languages into a common standard for the building or wide area network.

Some control systems are now being supplied with communications ports that conform to recognized standards such as BACnet, LonTalk or Ethernet many more provide interfaces to and from their own specialised control networks.

== Projects/organizations working toward digital integration ==
- World Wide Web Consortium (W3C)
- BACnet.org
