= Second New Deal =

1935–36 New Deal programs of U.S. president Roosevelt

The Second New Deal is a term used by historians to characterize the second stage, 1935–36, of the New Deal programs of President Franklin D. Roosevelt. The most famous laws included the Emergency Relief Appropriation Act, the Banking Act, the National Labor Relations Act, the Public Utility Holding Company Act, the Social Security Act, and the Wealth Tax Act.

In his address to Congress on January 4, 1935, Roosevelt called for five major goals: improved use of national resources, security against old age, unemployment and illness, slum clearance, and a national work relief program (the Works Progress Administration) to replace direct relief efforts. It included programs to redistribute wealth, income, and power in favor of the poor, the old, farmers and labor unions. The most important programs included Social Security, the National Labor Relations Act ("Wagner Act"), the Banking Act of 1935, rural electrification, and breaking up utility holding companies. The undistributed profits tax was only short-lived.

After trying since 1920, millions of organized World War I veterans demanded their bonus. They never convinced FDR but New Deal liberals in Congress passed the Bonus Bill of $1.5 billion to 3 million veterans over FDR's veto.

Liberals strongly supported the new direction, and formed the long-term voter New Deal Coalition of union members, big city machines, the white South, and ethnic minorities to support it. In reaction, conservatives—typified by the American Liberty League—were strongly opposed but not as well organized at the grass roots. Big business took the lead in opposition. Few liberal programs were enacted after 1936; liberals generally lost control of Congress in 1938. Old programs continued for a while. Many were ended during World War II because unemployment was no longer a problem. These included the WPA, NYA and the Resettlement Administration. Social Security and the Wagner Act, however, survived.

Most of the major laws had been under consideration by New Dealers for years. However, the increasing presence of agitators on the left, like Huey Long of Louisiana and Upton Sinclair's failed gubernatorial campaign in California, may have forced Roosevelt's hand. Other historians point to the influence of millions of organized World War veterans who wanted their bonus money for being a good citizen.

== See also ==
- New Deal coalition
