= In the Pink (James Galway and Henry Mancini album) =

Studio album by James Galway and Henry Mancini
- Released: 1984
- Recorded: 29 May – 1 June 1984
- Studio: CBS Studios, London
- Label: RCA Victor

In the Pink is a 1984 album of songs by James Galway and Henry Mancini on RCA.

== Track listing ==
All tracks composed by Henry Mancini; except where noted.
Side A:

1. "The Pink Panther" – 3:14
2. "Meggie's Theme" – 3:18 (from The Thorn Birds)
3. "Breakfast at Tiffany's" – 3:07
4. "Pennywhistle Jig" – 2:08 (from The Molly Maguires)
5. "Crazy World" (Mancini, Leslie Bricusse) – 3:08 (from Victor/Victoria)
6. "The Thorn Birds Theme" – 3:01
7. "Pie in the Face Polka" (from The Great Race) - 2:26

Side B:

1. "Baby Elephant Walk" – 3:00
2. "Two for the Road" (Mancini, Bricusse) – 3:14
3. "Speedy Gonzales" – 2:10
4. Theme from "The Molly Maguires" – 6:04
5. Medley: Three by Mancini and Mercer "Days of Wine and Roses"; "Charade"; "Moon River" – 6:04
6. Cameo for Flute "... for James." – 4:02
