= Integral (disambiguation) =

Integral is a concept in calculus.

Integral may also refer to:

in mathematics

- Integer, a number
- Integral symbol
- Integral (measure theory), or Lebesgue integration
- Integral element

in computer science

- Integral data type, a data type that represents some range of mathematical integers

in philosophy and spirituality

- Integral humanism (India), political philosophy in Hindu nationalism
- Integral theory, an area of discourse emanating from Ken Wilber's thought on spiritual evolution, methodology and ontology. Also known under other names, including integral philosophy, integral worldview, etc.
- Integral Culture, transmodern subculture referred to by sociologist Paul H. Ray

as a proper name

- INTEGRAL, the International Gamma-Ray Astrophysics Laboratory
- Intégral: The Journal of Applied Musical Thought, a music-theory journal
- Intégral Peripherals, a defunct American hard disk drive manufacturer
- "Integral (song)", a Pet Shop Boys song from Fundamental
- The Integral, a glass spaceship in Yevgeny Zamyatin's novel We
- Integral (horse), a British Thoroughbred racehorse
- Integral, an extended play by The Sixth Lie
- Integral (album)
- Integral (train), diesel multiple unit train type
- Intégrales, a compisition by Edgard Varèse

== See also ==
- Integralism, ideology according to which a nation is an organic unity
- Integrality, in commutative algebra, the notions of an element integral over a ring
- Integration (disambiguation)
