= Buğra Mert Alkayalar =

Turkish director and screenwriter (born 1998)

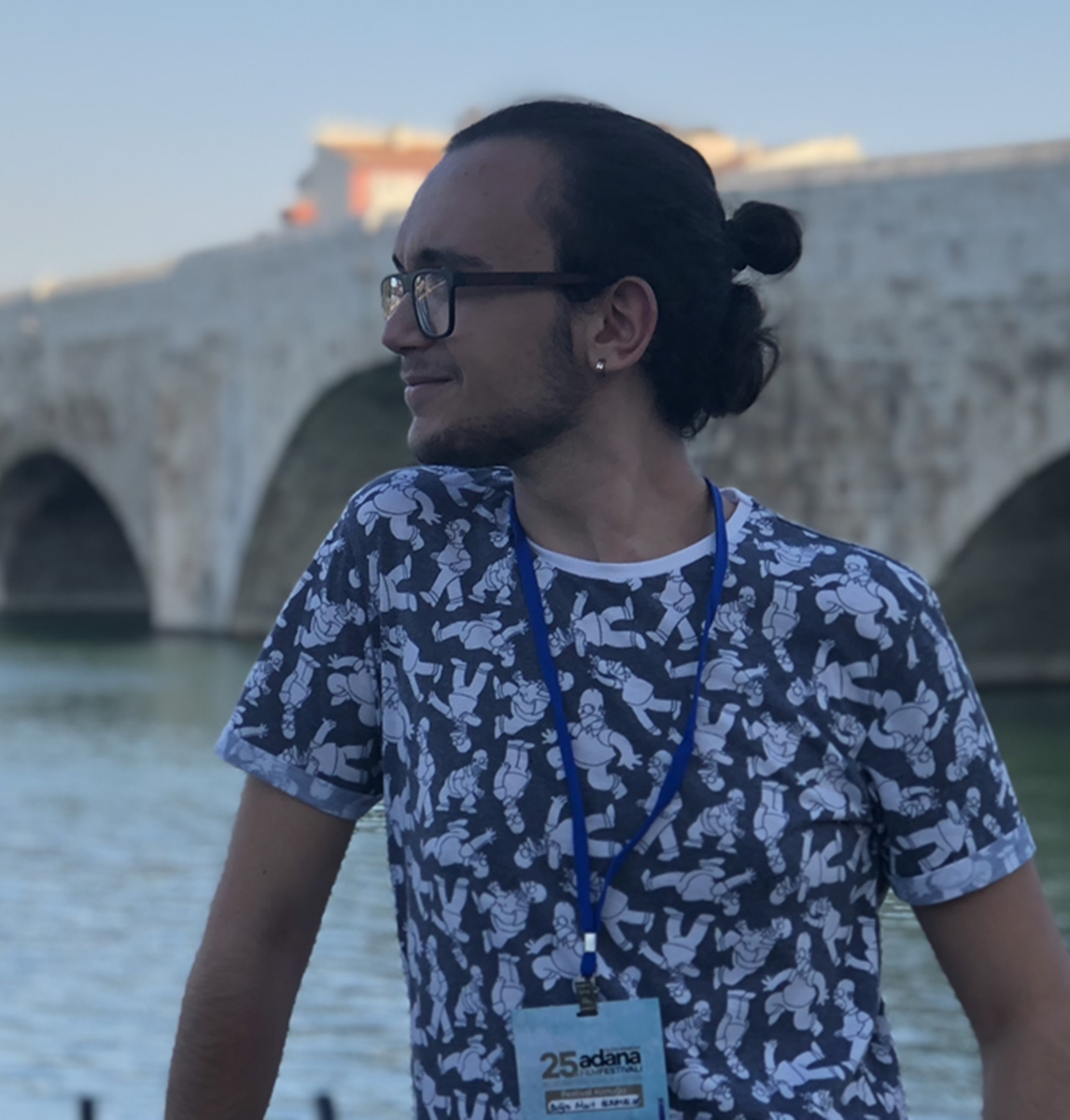
- Buğra Mert Alkayalar, September 2018, Adana Film Festival
- Born: Buğra Mert Alkayalar; 5 June 1998 (age 26); Yozgat, Turkey
- Occupation(s): director, writer
- Years active: 2017–present

Buğra Mert Alkayalar (5 June 1998, Yozgat) is a Turkish director and screenwriter.

He completed his elementary education in Tekirdağ, Turkey, and started studying Film and Television at University of Anatolia in 2016. Meanwhile, he completed his voice acting training in 2018 with the leadership of Kadir Özübek. He won an Audience Special Award for his experimental short film "Disintegration" at 6th International Antakya Film Festival. He also won a Best Thriller award for his short thriller Why Not? (2019) from IMDb's official Top Shorts Film Festival, and a Best Student Film award from Direct Monthly Online Film Festival.

== Filmography ==
- Be Careful What You Say (short film, 2020)
- Why Not? (short film, 2019)
- Fairy (short film, 2019)
- In The Pink (short film, 2019)
- Visitors at The Door (documentary short, 2018)
- Disintegration (short film, 2018)
- Session (short, 2018/II)
- Separated (short, 2018)

== Nominations ==
Festival Nominations

- 2020: Be Careful What You Say (nominee, best short)
- 2019: Fairy (nominee, best short film)
- 2019: Why Not? (nominee, best short film)
- 2019: Why Not? (nominee, best thriller)
- 2019: Why Not? (nominee, best student short)
- 2019: Why Not? (nominee, film of the month)
- 2019: Why Not? (nominee, best screenplay)
- 2018: Disintegration (nominee, best short experimental film)

== Awards ==
Festival Awards

- 2019: Why Not? (WON Best Student Short Film of the Month)
- 2019: Why Not (WON Best Thriller)
