= Undistributed profits tax =

1936–1939 U.S. federal tax

The undistributed profits tax was enacted in 1936 by the United States administration of President Franklin D. Roosevelt (FDR), during the Great Depression. The UP tax was a revenue program for FDR's New Deal. The act was controversial even within FDR's United States Treasury Department, as some economists such as Alfred G. Buehler thought that it would harm the ability of business to put capital towards company growth. In particular, Buehler reasoned that the UP tax would hit small business especially hard, as smaller businesses have fewer options in raising capital than large ones, usually by keeping a percentage of their profits for re-investment back into the business. The UP Tax was part of FDR's "Second New Deal".

The bill established the principle that retained corporate earnings could be taxed. The idea was to force businesses to distribute profits in dividend and wages, instead of saving or reinvesting them. In the end, Congress watered down the bill, setting the tax rates at 7 to 27% and largely exempting small enterprises.

Conservative critics of the New Deal considered this a burden on business growth. Facing widespread and fierce criticism, the tax was reduced to 2½ percent in 1938 and completely eliminated in 1939.

== See also ==
- Undistributed profits
- Revenue Act of 1936
