= Collapse =

Collapse or its variants may refer to:

== Concepts ==
- Collapse (structural)
- Collapse (topology), a mathematical concept
- Collapsing manifold
- Collapse, the action of collapsing or telescoping objects
- Collapsing user interface elements
  - Accordion (GUI) -- collapsing list items
  - Code folding -- collapsing subsections of programs or text
  - Outliner -- supporting folding and unfolding subsections
- Economic collapse
- Ecosystem collapse
- Gravitational collapse creating astronomical objects
- Societal collapse
- State collapse
- Wave function collapse, in physics

== Medicine and biology ==
- Circulatory collapse
- Lung collapse
- Hydrophobic collapse in protein folding

== Art, entertainment and media ==
=== Literature ===
- Collapse: How Societies Choose to Fail or Succeed, a book by Jared Diamond
- Collapse (journal), a journal of philosophical research and development published in the United Kingdom

=== Film ===
- Collapse (film), a 2009 documentary directed by Chris Smith and starring Michael Ruppert
- Collapse, a 2010 documentary based on the Jared Diamond book

=== Games ===
- Collapse (2008 video game), an action game released in 2008 for Microsoft Windows
- Collapse!, a 1999 series games created by GameHouse
- The Collapse (Deus Ex), a fictional event within the plot of the computer game Deus Ex and its sequel Deus Ex: Invisible War

=== Music ===
==== Albums ====
- Collapse (Across Five Aprils album), 2006
- Collapse (Deas Vail album), 2006
- Collapse EP, 2018 record by Aphex Twin

==== Songs ====
- "Collapse" (Soul Coughing song), 1996
- "Collapse" (Saosin song), 2006
- "Collapse" (Imperative Reaction song), 2006
- "Collapsed" (Aly & AJ song), 2005
