= Problem Solvers Caucus =

Bipartisan group of U.S. representatives

- Co-Chairs: Tom Suozzi (D); Brian Fitzpatrick (R)
- Founded: January 23, 2017; 9 years ago
- Ideology: Centrism; Bipartisanship
- Political position: Center
- Colors: Blue; Red
- Seats in the House Democratic Caucus: 26 / 214
- Seats in the House Republican Conference: 23 / 219
- Seats in the House (Note: 1 member non-voting in the full House): 48 / 435

Website
- problemsolverscaucus.house.gov

The Problem Solvers Caucus is a group in the United States House of Representatives that has included members equally divided between Democrats and Republicans, with the stated goal of fostering bipartisan cooperation on key policy issues. The group was created in January 2017 as an outgrowth of meetings held by the political organization No Labels as early as 2014. As of 2026, the caucus is co-chaired by Tom Suozzi (D-NY) and Brian Fitzpatrick (R-PA).

== History ==
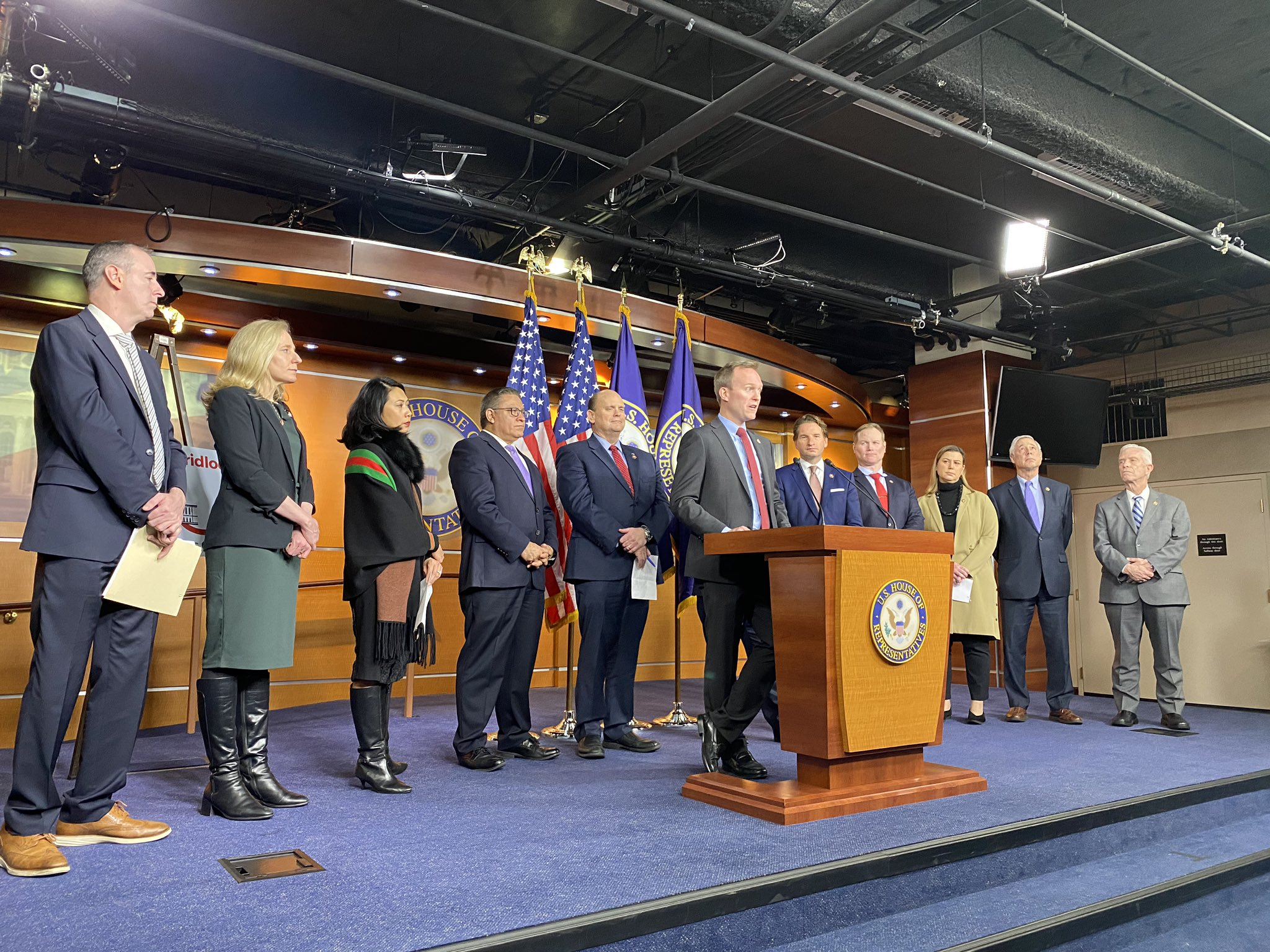
Problem Solvers Caucus hosting a press conference in 2020

The Problem Solvers Caucus developed over time as an outgrowth of informal meetings organized by the group No Labels. No Labels spent years on Capitol Hill working to get members in a room to talk with colleagues from the other party. These informal "get to know you" meetings led to more substantive cooperation across the aisle, including the introduction of nine bipartisan bills to reduce government waste and inefficiency, and the introduction of the No Budget, No Pay Act of 2013 and the Medicare "doc fix" in 2015.

Over time, No Labels continued to organize members into a more cohesive group and eventually branded the group the "Problem Solvers" and recruited its first two co-chairs, Rep. Reid Ribble (R-WI) and Rep. Kurt Schrader (D-OR). This group of members organized by No Labels also signed a resolution (H.R. 207) calling for both parties to unify behind a National Strategic Agenda with four goals: job creation, balancing the budget, securing Medicare and Social Security, and energy security.

Then co-chairs Reed and Gottheimer said in 2017, "We all knew the partisanship in Washington had gotten out of control and felt the need to create a bipartisan group committed to getting to 'yes' on important issues. We have agreed to vote together for any policy proposal that garners the support of 75 percent of the entire Problem Solvers Caucus, as well as 51 percent of both the Democrats and Republicans in the caucus." To ensure party balance, a new member can only join the caucus when a member of the opposing party joins at the same time.

=== Healthcare reform ===
During the week of August 4, 2017, the 43-member House Problem Solvers Caucus released a compromise to shore up the struggling insurance exchanges. The proposal focused on the skyrocketing cost of individual health insurance premiums. At the time, the Trump administration considered suspending cost-sharing payments that defray out-of-pocket costs such as deductibles and co-payments, a move that insurers said could cause premiums to rise by 15 percent or more.

The second part of the Problem Solvers plan would have provided relief to help states address the high costs of pre-existing and chronic conditions. The relief is provided through a dedicated stability fund that states could use to reduce premiums and limit losses for providing coverage for these high-cost patients. The third part of the plan relieves certain businesses of the mandate to provide insurance to full-time employees. It also defines "full time" as a 40-hour workweek to discourage businesses from manipulating employees' weekly hours to skirt the mandate.

The plan would also have eliminated the Medical Device Tax, an excise charge of 2.3 percent, which opponents claim is passed on to consumers and reduces funds for research and development.

=== Congressional rules reform ===
After the 2018 midterm elections, the Problem Solvers Caucus and the House Democratic Leadership negotiated a package to reform the rules of the House. The Washington Post's Editorial Board predicted that those new rules should "ease consideration of bipartisan amendments, create a 'consensus calendar' to reserve time for bills with wide bipartisan support and make it harder for extremists on the House's wings to threaten to oust the speaker." Some on the left argued against the changes saying they would essentially weaken Speaker Pelosi and the Democrats in the House.

=== COVID-19 relief ===
In September 2020, the Problem Solvers released their "March to Common Ground" COVID-19 relief package, an outline of a bipartisan Congressional compromise that demonstrated that members of both parties were willing to listen to each other to craft legislation.

=== Capitol riot and reaction ===
On May 18, 2021, the Problem Solvers Caucus endorsed bipartisan legislation to investigate the attack on the Capitol. The next day, 18 of 28 Republican Problem Solvers, compared to 17 of the other 182 Republicans voting and every Democrat voting, voted in support of creating a bipartisan commission to lead the investigation.

=== Ousting of McCarthy ===
After the 2023 October Continuing Resolution was passed on September 30, 2023, Congressman Matt Gaetz presented the motion to vacate against Speaker Kevin McCarthy on October 3, in which all Democrats voted to vacate alongside eight Republicans. Republican members of the Problem Solvers Caucus criticized their Democratic counterparts for not defending McCarthy after he passed a bipartisan bill, considering it an undermining of bipartisanship credibility, although Nancy Mace, a Republican member of the Problem Solvers Caucus herself, also voted alongside Democrats to remove McCarthy. Within the caucus, the Republican argument that defending the speaker would protect the institution was met with the Democratic rebuttal that McCarthy refused to certify the 2020 election. The schism formed from this event persisted long after the vote, with the caucus acting only in small groups rather than as a 64-member bloc for bipartisan issues. Republican members were looking at removing Democratic members who did not cross the aisle often enough, while Democratic members believed the caucus was not doing enough to combat the far-right influence in the general GOP.

=== 119th Congress ===
After the results of the 2024 United States House of Representatives elections showed the 119th United States Congress would have an even narrower Republican majority than the 118th had, the group met as a whole for the first time in a year.

== List of co-chairs ==
Start	End	Democratic Co-Chair	Republican Co-Chair
January 13, 2013	January 3, 2015	Kurt Schrader (OR)	Reid Ribble (WI)
January 3, 2015	January 3, 2017	Kurt Schrader (OR)	Tom Reed (NY)
January 3, 2017	January 3, 2021	Josh Gottheimer (NJ)	Tom Reed (NY)
January 3, 2021	January 3, 2025	Josh Gottheimer (NJ)	Brian Fitzpatrick (PA)
January 3, 2025	present	Tom Suozzi (NY)	Brian Fitzpatrick (PA)

== Membership ==
Problem Solvers Caucus in the 119th United States Congress: Democratic Problem Solvers caucus member Republican Problem Solvers caucus member

This group includes 49 members as of March 6, 2025: 26 Democrats and 23 Republicans.

=== Current members ===
==== Democrats ====
State	District	CPVI	Member	Also a member of	Notes
California	CA-09	D+8	Josh Harder	New Democrat Coalition	
California	CA-19	D+18	Jimmy Panetta	New Democrat Coalition	
California	CA-21	D+5	Jim Costa	New Democrat Coalition; Blue Dog Coalition	
California	CA-24	D+13	Salud Carbajal	New Democrat Coalition	
California	CA-50	D+10	Scott Peters	New Democrat Coalition	
Colorado	CO-07	D+8	Brittany Pettersen	New Democrat Coalition	
Florida	FL-09	R+8	Darren Soto	New Democrat Coalition	
Hawaii	HI-01	D+13	Ed Case	New Democrat Coalition	Vice-chair
Illinois	IL-10	D+12	Brad Schneider	New Democrat Coalition	
Maine	ME-02	R+4	Jared Golden	Blue Dog Coalition	
Michigan	MI-03	D+4	Hillary Scholten	New Democrat Coalition	
Michigan	MI-06	D+12	Debbie Dingell		
Michigan	MI-11	D+9	Haley Stevens	New Democrat Coalition	
Minnesota	MN-02	D+3	Angie Craig	New Democrat Coalition	
Nevada	NV-03	D+1	Susie Lee	New Democrat Coalition	Vice-chair
Nevada	NV-04	D+2	Steven Horsford	New Democrat Coalition	
New Hampshire	NH-01	D+2	Chris Pappas	New Democrat Coalition	
New Jersey	NJ-01	D+10	Donald Norcross	New Democrat Coalition	
New Jersey	NJ-05	D+2	Josh Gottheimer	New Democrat Coalition; Blue Dog Coalition	
New York	NY-03	EVEN	Tom Suozzi	New Democrat Coalition	Co-chair
North Carolina	NC-01	R+5	Don Davis	New Democrat Coalition	
Ohio	OH-01	R+1	Greg Landsman	New Democrat Coalition	Co-whip
Ohio	OH-13	D+2	Emilia Sykes	New Democrat Coalition	
Pennsylvania	PA-06	D+6	Chrissy Houlahan	New Democrat Coalition	
Texas	TX-28	R+3	Henry Cuellar	New Democrat Coalition; Blue Dog Coalition	
Washington	WA-03	R+2	Marie Gluesenkamp Perez	Blue Dog Coalition	

==== Republicans ====
State	District	CPVI	Member	Also a member of	Notes
Arizona	AZ-06	EVEN	Juan Ciscomani	Republican Governance Group; Republican Main Street Partnership	
California	CA-22	D+1	David Valadao	Republican Governance Group; Republican Main Street Partnership	
California	CA-40	R+6	Young Kim	Republican Governance Group; Republican Main Street Partnership	
Colorado	CO-03	R+5	Jeff Hurd	Republican Study Committee	
Colorado	CO-08	EVEN	Gabe Evans	Republican Governance Group; Republican Main Street Partnership	
Florida	FL-27	R+6	Maria Elvira Salazar	Republican Governance Group; Republican Main Street Partnership	
Guam	GU-AL	—	James Moylan		Non-voting member of the House of Representatives
Nebraska	NE-02	D+3	Don Bacon	Republican Study Committee	Co-whip
New Jersey	NJ-07	EVEN	Thomas Kean Jr.		
New York	NY-01	R+4	Nick LaLota	Republican Governance Group; Republican Main Street Partnership	
New York	NY-02	R+6	Andrew Garbarino	Republican Governance Group; Republican Main Street Partnership	Vice-chair
New York	NY-11	R+10	Nicole Malliotakis	Republican Study Committee; Republican Governance Group; Republican Main Street Partnership	Vice-chair
New York	NY-17	D+1	Mike Lawler	Republican Governance Group; Republican Main Street Partnership	
North Carolina	NC-11	R+5	Chuck Edwards	Republican Study Committee; Main Street Caucus	
Ohio	OH-14	R+10	David Joyce	Republican Study Committee; Republican Governance Group; Republican Main Street Partnership	
Pennsylvania	PA-01	D+1	Brian Fitzpatrick	Republican Governance Group	Co-chair
Pennsylvania	PA-08	R+4	Rob Bresnahan	Main Street Caucus; Republican Governance Group	
Pennsylvania	PA-09	R+19	Daniel Meuser	Republican Study Committee; Republican Main Street Partnership	
South Dakota	SD-AL	R+15	Dusty Johnson	Republican Main Street Partnership	
Utah	UT-01	D+12	Blake Moore	Republican Study Committee; Republican Governance Group; Republican Main Street Partnership	
Virginia	VA-02	EVEN	Jen Kiggans	Republican Governance Group; Republican Main Street Partnership	
Virginia	VA-06	R+12	Ben Cline	Republican Study Committee; Freedom Caucus	
Wisconsin	WI-01	R+2	Bryan Steil	Republican Study Committee; Republican Governance Group; Republican Main Street Partnership	

=== Former members ===
==== Democrats ====
===== In office =====
- Lou Correa of California
- Vicente Gonzalez of Texas
- Mark Pocan of Wisconsin

===== No longer in the House of Representatives =====
- Anthony Brindisi of New York (lost reelection in 2020)
- Carolyn Bourdeaux of Georgia (lost renomination in 2022 due to redistricting)
- Joe Cunningham of South Carolina (lost reelection in 2020)
- Elizabeth Esty of Connecticut (did not seek reelection in 2018)
- Kendra Horn of Oklahoma (lost reelection in 2020)
- Conor Lamb of Pennsylvania (did not seek reelection in 2022)
- Daniel Lipinski of Illinois (lost Democratic nomination in 2020)
- Elaine Luria of Virginia (lost reelection in 2022)
- Tom Malinowski of New Jersey (lost reelection in 2022)
- Ben McAdams of Utah (lost reelection in 2020)
- Stephanie Murphy of Florida (did not seek reelection in 2022)
- Richard Nolan of Minnesota (did not seek reelection in 2018)
- Tom O'Halleran of Arizona (lost reelection in 2022)
- Jared Polis of Colorado (elected Governor of Colorado in 2018)
- Jacky Rosen of Nevada (elected to United States Senate in 2018)
- Max Rose of New York (lost reelection in 2020)
- Kurt Schrader of Oregon (lost renomination in 2022)
- Kyrsten Sinema of Arizona (elected to United States Senate in 2018)
- Peter Welch of Vermont (elected to United States Senate in 2022)
- Elissa Slotkin of Michigan (elected to the Senate in 2024)
- Wiley Nickel of North Carolina (did not seek re-election in 2024)
- Dean Phillips of Minnesota (did not seek re-election in 2024)
- Mary Peltola of Alaska (lost re-election in 2024)
- Abigail Spanberger of Virginia (did not seek re-election in 2024)
- David Trone of Maryland (ran for Senate in 2024)
- Dan Kildee of Michigan (did not seek re-election in 2024)

==== Republicans ====
===== In office =====
- Mark Amodei of Nevada
- Mike Bost of Illinois
- Pete Stauber of Minnesota
- Glenn Thompson of Pennsylvania
- Chris Smith of New Jersey
- Nancy Mace of South Carolina
- Lloyd Smucker of Pennsylvania
- John James of Michigan

===== No longer in the House of Representatives =====
- Mike Coffman of Colorado (lost reelection in 2018)
- Ryan Costello of Pennsylvania (did not seek reelection in 2018)
- Carlos Curbelo of Florida (lost reelection in 2018)
- Charlie Dent of Pennsylvania (resigned in 2018)
- John Faso of New York (lost reelection in 2018)
- Mike Gallagher of Wisconsin (resigned in 2024)
- Tony Gonzales of Texas (resigned in 2026)
- Anthony Gonzalez of Ohio (did not seek reelection in 2022)
- Jaime Herrera Beutler of Washington (lost renomination in 2022)
- Will Hurd of Texas (did not seek reelection in 2020)
- Lynn Jenkins of Kansas (did not seek reelection in 2018)
- Bill Johnson of Ohio (resigned to become president of Youngstown University in 2024)
- John Katko of New York (did not seek reelection in 2022)
- Tom MacArthur of New Jersey (lost reelection in 2018)
- Patrick Meehan of Pennsylvania (resigned in 2018)
- Peter Meijer of Michigan (lost renomination in 2022)
- Tom Reed of New York (resigned in 2022)
- Reid Ribble of Wisconsin (did not seek reelection in 2016)
- Tom Rice of South Carolina (lost renomination in 2022)
- Ileana Ros-Lehtinen of Florida (did not seek reelection in 2018)
- Van Taylor of Texas (did not seek reelection in 2022)
- Dave Trott of Michigan (did not seek reelection in 2018)
- Fred Upton of Michigan (did not seek reelection in 2022)
- Steve Watkins of Kansas (lost Republican nomination in 2020)
- David Young of Iowa (lost reelection in 2018)
- Brandon Williams of New York (lost re-election in 2024)
- Lori Chavez-DeRemer of Oregon (lost re-election in 2024)
- John Curtis of Utah (elected to the Senate in 2024)
- Anthony D'Esposito of New York (lost re-election in 2024)
- Jenniffer Gonzalez of Puerto Rico (Note: New Progressive, caucuses with Republicans) (Note: Non-voting member of the full house) (did not seek re-election in 2024)
- Marc Molinaro of New York (lost re-election in 2024)

== Media coverage ==
The New York Times reported in May 2023 that the Democratic wing of the caucus is in "open revolt" over No Labels' progress in pursuing a third-party presidential ticket for 2024.

Tom Reed, former Republican co-chair said in 2019, "The Problem Solvers Caucus has been finding itself in the middle of several key battles and make common cause with its natural Senate allies".

Mark Pocan, a former caucus member and co-chair of the Congressional Progressive Caucus, a left-leaning organization, said in 2018 that he was "duped" by No Labels and the PSC, saying that rather than "breaking gridlock", it was "a fast track for special interests and lobbyists."

== See also ==
- Build America Caucus
