= New Democrat Coalition =

Political caucus in United States

- Abbreviation: NDC
- Chair: Brad Schneider (IL‑10)
- Founded: 1997; 29 years ago
- Ideology: Liberalism
- Political position: Center to center-left
- National affiliation: Democratic Party
- Seats in the House Democratic Caucus: 112 / 214 (Note: This figure does not include Stacey Plaskett or Pablo Hernández Rivera, who are non-voting delegates and members of the caucus.)
- Seats in the House: 112 / 435

Website
- newdemocratcoalition.house.gov

The New Democrat Coalition is a caucus in the House of Representatives of the United States Congress made up of Democrats, primarily liberals and centrists, who take a pro-business stance and a liberal-to-moderate approach to fiscal matters. Most members hold socially liberal views.

The caucus has been described as being centrist to center-left.

When the 119th Congress convened on January 3, 2025, the New Democrat Coalition touted 110 members (including one nonvoting member), of which 30 were also members of the Congressional Progressive Caucus and 6 were also members of Blue Dog Coalition, accounting for more than half of all Democratic representatives. The New Democrat Coalition is the largest House Democratic ideological caucus, followed by the Congressional Progressive Caucus.

== Overview ==
The New Democrat Coalition is a caucus within the House of Representatives founded in 1997 by Representatives Cal Dooley, Jim Moran, and Tim Roemer.

The Coalition supported "Third Way" policies during the presidency of Bill Clinton. The Coalition consists of liberal, moderate, and centrist Democrats. After the sharp decline of the Blue Dog Coalition in the 2010s, the New Democrat Coalition gained some of the Blue Dog Coalition's former clout by also having members from swing seats.

The group is known as fiscally moderate and pro-business. For example, the New Democrat Coalition supports free trade and the high-tech sector. The New Democrat Coalition also supports immigration reform.

Ideologically, it is positioned between the House Progressive Caucus and the Blue Dog Coalition. The Coalition has been described as both socially liberal and fiscally moderate-to-conservative.

== Policy positions ==
The NDC advocates "working to bridge the partisan divide with a solutions-oriented approach to politics", combating climate change, transitioning to sustainable energy, increased access towards healthcare, and strengthening U.S. national security.

=== Economy ===
According to their Economic Opportunity Agenda, they value the diversification and strengthening of global supply chains, the enaction of legislation to address current constraints to global trade, the reduction of costs for U.S. consumers, and to buttress the Indo-Pacific Economic Framework. They believe in a transparent exclusion process from Section 301 tariffs, and pursuing free trade agreements with the United Kingdom, Kenya, and Taiwan. The NDC lays out their plan to the reduction of energy prices and the transition to sustainable energy by instituting the investments made in the Inflation Reduction Act and easing market barriers towards cleaner energy.

=== Healthcare ===
On April 3, 2019, Representative Ami Bera introduced HR 2061, proposing state market mechanisms to increase enrollment, particularly focusing on auto-enrollment for those qualifying for $0 premium health plans.

==== Abortion rights ====
The New Democrat Coalition supports the right to travel for abortion, the protection of doctors who conduct abortions, and the enshrining of protections for reproductive care for servicewomen and military families. They also support the codification of abortion rights as protected by Roe v. Wade.

=== National security ===
According to their National Security Principles they value the modernization and sustainment of the U.S. Military, reinforcement of American internationalism, strengthening of regional commitments, reinforcing U.S. cybersecurity, and addressing the deficit.

==== Cybersecurity ====
When it comes to cybersecurity, the New Democrat Coalition's cybersecurity task force confronts digital security with fostering public-private information sharing, developing stronger defenses against cyberwarfare and cyberterrorism, establishment of a strong pipeline of workers to address said cyberwarfare and cyberterrorism, investment into stronger defenses in the public and private sectors, and securing the Internet of Things.

=== Climate change ===
According to the NDC's Principles for U.S. Climate Policy, they propose American global coordination towards climate solutions, transition to a clean energy economy, enacting climate-forward policies towards disaster relief and the transition of local communities to a sustainable energy grid, and recommitting to the Paris Agreement.

=== Foreign policy ===
==== Israel and Palestine ====
On October 12, 2023, five days after the October 7 attacks, the NDC endorsed a bipartisan resolution on standing with Israel and unequivocally condemning Hamas. Later, on October 20, they endorsed Joe Biden's request for supplemental funding for both Israel and Ukraine.

==== Russian invasion of Ukraine ====
On April 20, 2024, the NDC affirmed their commitment to Ukraine by endorsing the Ukraine Supplemental Appropriations Act of 2024. They would later applaud the success of the bill on April 23.

== Leadership ==
As of the 118th United States Congress, the Coalition's leaders are as follows:

- Chair: Brad Schneider (IL-10)
- Vice Chair for Outreach: Salud Carbajal (CA-24)
- Vice Chair for Member Services: Josh Harder (CA-09)
- Vice Chair for Communications: Marc Veasey (TX-33)
- Vice Chair for Policy: Nikki Budzinski (IL-13)
- Vice Chair At Large: Haley Stevens (MI-11)
- Whip: Marilyn Strickland (WA-10)
- Leadership Member: Jennifer McClellan (VA-04)
- Leadership Member: Andrea Salinas (OR-06)
- Freshman Leadership Representative: Kristen McDonald Rivet (MI-08)

=== Chairs ===
Current caucus rules only allow for a single chair who serves a single, 2-year term. However, when the caucus began it permitted multiple chairs and 4-year terms.

Start	End	Chair(s)	District
March 6, 1997	January 3, 2001	Cal Dooley	CA-20
March 6, 1997	January 3, 2001	Jim Moran	VA-08
March 6, 1997	January 3, 2001	Tim Roemer	IN-03
January 3, 2001	January 3, 2005	Jim Davis	FL-11
January 3, 2001	January 3, 2005	Adam Smith	WA-09
January 3, 2001	January 3, 2007	Ron Kind	WI-03
January 3, 2005	January 3, 2007	Artur Davis	AL-07
January 3, 2005	June 26, 2009	Ellen Tauscher	CA-10
June 26, 2009	January 3, 2013	Joe Crowley	NY-07
January 3, 2013	January 3, 2017	Ron Kind	WI-03
January 3, 2017	January 3, 2019	Jim Himes	CT-04
January 3, 2019	January 3, 2021	Derek Kilmer	WA-06
January 3, 2021	January 3, 2023	Suzan DelBene	WA-01
January 3, 2023	January 3, 2025	Annie Kuster	NH-02
January 3, 2025	January 3, 2027	Brad Schneider	IL-10
January 3, 2027	Designate	Nikki Budzinski	IL-13

== Membership ==
=== Electoral results ===
New Democrat Coalition in the 118th United States Congress

Election year	Democratic seats	±
2000	74 / 212	Steady
2002	73 / 205	▼1
2004	74 / 202	▲1
2006	63 / 233	▼11
2008	59 / 257	▼4
2010	42 / 193	▼17
2012	53 / 201	▲11
2014	46 / 188	▼7
2016	61 / 194	▲15
2018	103 / 233	▲42
2020	94 / 222	▼9
2022	94 / 213	Steady
2024	109 / 215	▲15

=== Current members ===
As of August 11, 2025, the New Democrat Coalition had 116 members. Those members include 115 U.S. Representatives and one non-voting delegate of the House of Representatives. Of these, 85 were reelected in the 2024 United States House of Representatives elections, while 25 non-incumbents endorsed by the caucus PAC were elected to congress. Kevin Mullin, Brad Sherman, Jahana Hayes, Dan Goldman, Mike Levin, and James Walkinshaw joined the caucus at a later point.

When the 120th Congress is seated, the caucus is set to have 142 members.

State	District	CPVI	Member	Also a member of	Notes
Alabama	AL-02	R+7	Shomari Figures		
Alabama	AL-07	D+10	Terri Sewell		
Arizona	AZ-04	D+4	Greg Stanton		
California	CA-06	D+5	Ami Bera		
California	CA-09	D+8	Josh Harder		
California	CA-13	D+2	Adam Gray	Blue Dog Coalition	
California	CA-15	D+26	Kevin Mullin	Congressional Progressive Caucus	
California	CA-16	D+25	Sam Liccardo		
California	CA-19	D+18	Jimmy Panetta	Congressional Progressive Caucus	
California	CA-21	D+5	Jim Costa	Blue Dog Coalition; Problem Solvers Caucus	
California	CA-24	D+13	Salud Carbajal		Vice Chair for Outreach
California	CA-25	D+4	Raul Ruiz		
California	CA-26	D+9	Julia Brownley		Retiring at the end of the 119th Congress
California	CA-27	D+6	George T. Whitesides		
California	CA-31	D+8	Gil Cisneros		
California	CA-32	D+14	Brad Sherman	Congressional Progressive Caucus	
California	CA-33	D+7	Pete Aguilar		Whip
California	CA-35	D+6	Norma Torres		
California	CA-45	D+3	Derek Tran		
California	CA-46	D+10	Lou Correa	Blue Dog Coalition	
California	CA-49	D+7	Mike Levin	Congressional Progressive Caucus	
California	CA-50	D+10	Scott H. Peters		
California	CA-51	D+10	Sara Jacobs	Congressional Progressive Caucus	
California	CA-52	D+11	Juan Vargas	Congressional Progressive Caucus	
Colorado	CO-06	D+11	Jason Crow		
Colorado	CO-07	D+8	Brittany Pettersen		
Connecticut	CT-02	D+4	Joe Courtney		
Connecticut	CT-04	D+13	Jim Himes		
Connecticut	CT-05	D+3	Jahana Hayes		
Delaware	DE-AL	D+8	Sarah McBride	Congressional Progressive Caucus	
Florida	FL-09	R+8	Darren Soto	Congressional Progressive Caucus	
Florida	FL-23	D+9	Jared Moskowitz		
Florida	FL-25	R+3	Debbie Wasserman Schultz		
Georgia	GA-05	D+36	Nikema Williams	Congressional Progressive Caucus	
Georgia	GA-06	D+25	Lucy McBath		
Georgia	GA-13	D+21	David Scott		Died in 2026
Hawaii	HI-01	D+13	Ed Case		
Illinois	IL-05	D+19	Mike Quigley		
Illinois	IL-06	D+3	Sean Casten		
Illinois	IL-08	D+5	Raja Krishnamoorthi		Retiring to run for U.S. Senate
Illinois	IL-10	D+12	Brad Schneider		Vice Chair for Communications
Illinois	IL-11	D+6	Bill Foster		
Illinois	IL-13	D+5	Nikki Budzinski		
Illinois	IL-17	D+3	Eric Sorensen		
Indiana	IN-01	D+1	Frank J. Mrvan		
Indiana	IN-07	D+21	André Carson	Congressional Progressive Caucus	
Kansas	KS-03	D+2	Sharice Davids		Vice Chair for Member Services
Kentucky	KY-03	D+10	Morgan McGarvey	Congressional Progressive Caucus	
Louisiana	LA-02	D+25	Troy Carter	Congressional Progressive Caucus	
Maryland	MD-02	D+10	Johnny Olszewski		
Maryland	MD-03	D+12	Sarah Elfreth		
Maryland	MD-04	D+39	Glenn Ivey		
Maryland	MD-06	D+3	April McClain Delaney		
Massachusetts	MA-03	D+11	Lori Trahan	Congressional Progressive Caucus	At-large Leadership Member
Massachusetts	MA-06	D+11	Seth Moulton		Retiring to run for U.S. Senate
Massachusetts	MA-09	D+6	Bill Keating		
Michigan	MI-03	D+4	Hillary Scholten		
Michigan	MI-08	R+1	Kristen McDonald Rivet		
Michigan	MI-11	D+9	Haley Stevens		Retiring to run for U.S. Senate
Michigan	MI-13	D+22	Shri Thanedar	Congressional Progressive Caucus	Los renomination
Minnesota	MN-02	D+3	Angie Craig		Retiring to run for U.S. Senate
Minnesota	MN-03	D+11	Kelly Morrison		
Missouri	MO-01	D+29	Wesley Bell		
Nevada	NV-03	D+1	Susie Lee		Whip
Nevada	NV-04	D+2	Steven Horsford	Congressional Progressive Caucus	
New Hampshire	NH-01	D+2	Chris Pappas		Retiring to run for U.S. Senate
New Hampshire	NH-02	D+2	Maggie Goodlander		
New Jersey	NJ-01	D+10	Donald Norcross	Congressional Progressive Caucus	
New Jersey	NJ-03	D+5	Herb Conaway		
New Jersey	NJ-05	D+2	Josh Gottheimer	Blue Dog Coalition; Problem Solvers Caucus	
New Jersey	NJ-09	D+2	Nellie Pou	Congressional Progressive Caucus	
New Jersey	NJ-11	D+5	Mikie Sherrill		Resigned to become Governor of New Jersey
New Mexico	NM-02	EVEN	Gabe Vasquez		
New York	NY-03	EVEN	Tom Suozzi		
New York	NY-04	D+2	Laura Gillen		
New York	NY-05	D+24	Gregory Meeks		
New York	NY-10	D+32	Dan Goldman	Congressional Progressive Caucus	Lost renomination
New York	NY-16	D+18	George Latimer		
New York	NY-18	D+2	Pat Ryan		
New York	NY-19	D+1	Josh Riley		
New York	NY-22	D+4	John Mannion		
New York	NY-25	D+10	Joe Morelle		
New York	NY-26	D+11	Tim Kennedy		
North Carolina	NC-01	R+5	Don Davis		
North Carolina	NC-02	D+17	Deborah K. Ross		
North Carolina	NC-04	D+23	Valerie Foushee	Congressional Progressive Caucus	
Ohio	OH-01	R+1	Greg Landsman		
Ohio	OH-11	D+28	Shontel Brown	Congressional Progressive Caucus	
Ohio	OH-13	D+2	Emilia Sykes		
Oregon	OR-04	D+6	Val Hoyle		
Oregon	OR-05	D+4	Janelle Bynum	Congressional Progressive Caucus	
Oregon	OR-06	D+6	Andrea Salinas	Congressional Progressive Caucus	
Pennsylvania	PA-02	D+19	Brendan Boyle	Congressional Progressive Caucus	
Pennsylvania	PA-04	D+8	Madeleine Dean	Congressional Progressive Caucus	
Pennsylvania	PA-05	D+15	Mary Gay Scanlon	Congressional Progressive Caucus	
Pennsylvania	PA-06	D+6	Chrissy Houlahan		
Rhode Island	RI-02	D+4	Seth Magaziner		
Texas	TX-07	D+13	Lizzie Fletcher		
Texas	TX-16	D+11	Veronica Escobar	Congressional Progressive Caucus	
Texas	TX-20	D+16	Joaquin Castro	Congressional Progressive Caucus	
Texas	TX-28	R+3	Henry Cuellar	Blue Dog Coalition; Problem Solvers Caucus	
Texas	TX-32	R+8	Julie Johnson		
Texas	TX-33	D+18	Marc Veasey		At-large Leadership Member; retiring at the end of the 119th Congress
Texas	TX-34	R+3	Vicente Gonzalez	Blue Dog Coalition	
Virginia	VA-04	D+17	Jennifer McClellan	Congressional Progressive Caucus	
Virginia	VA-07	D+2	Eugene Vindman		
Virginia	VA-08	D+26	Don Beyer	Congressional Progressive Caucus	
Virginia	VA-10	D+6	Suhas Subramanyam		
Virginia	VA-11	D+18	James Walkinshaw		
Washington	WA-01	D+15	Suzan DelBene		Chair Emeritus
Washington	WA-02	D+12	Rick Larsen		
Washington	WA-06	D+10	Emily Randall	Congressional Progressive Caucus	
Washington	WA-08	D+3	Kim Schrier		
Washington	WA-09	D+22	Adam Smith	Congressional Progressive Caucus	
Washington	WA-10	D+9	Marilyn Strickland		
Non-voting	VI-AL	—	Stacey Plaskett		
Non-voting	PR-AL	—	Pablo Hernández Rivera		

== Campaign arm ==
The NewDem Action Fund, formerly known as the NewDemPAC, is the campaign arm of the caucus.

== See also ==
- Blue Dog Coalition
- Congressional Progressive Caucus
- Cultural liberalism
- Democratic Leadership Council
- New Democrats
- Republican Governance Group
- Republican Main Street Partnership
- Third Way (United States)
