= Chris Pappas =

Chris Pappas may refer to:

== People ==
- Chris Pappas (American politician) (born 1980), American politician
- Chris Pappas (South African politician) (born 1991), South African politician
- Christopher D. Pappas, CEO of Trinseo

== Fictional characters ==
- Chris Pappas (Neighbours), a fictional character on the television series Neighbours
- Chris Pappas (EastEnders), a fictional character on the television series EastEnders
