= New Jersey's congressional districts =

Electoral districts in the USA

Map of New Jersey's congressional districts since 2023 Interactive map version

There currently are 12 United States congressional districts in New Jersey based on results from the 2020 census. There were once as many as 15. The fifteenth district was lost after the 1980 census, the fourteenth district was lost after the 1990 census, and the thirteenth district was lost after the 2010 census.

Between the 1998 and 2018 elections, Democrats held between 6 and 8 seats. The 2018 elections brought Democrats to 11 of the 12 seats, which was their highest since the 1912 elections. This left Chris Smith in the 4th district as the only Republican member of New Jersey's congressional delegation for the 116th Congress. It was also the first time since that election that Republicans failed to hold any seat in North Jersey. In the 118th Congress, Democrats hold 9 of the 12 seats.

== Current districts and representatives ==
This is a list of United States representatives from New Jersey, their terms, their district boundaries, and the district political ratings, according to the CPVI. The delegation currently has a total of 12 members, including 9 Democrats, and 3 Republicans.

Current U.S. representatives from New Jersey
| District | Member (Residence) | Party | Incumbent since | CPVI (2025) | District map |
|---|---|---|---|---|---|
| 1st | Donald Norcross (Camden) | Democratic | November 12, 2014 | D+10 | |
| 2nd | Jeff Van Drew (Dennis Township) | Republican | January 3, 2019 | R+5 | |
| 3rd | Herb Conaway (Delran) | Democratic | January 3, 2025 | D+5 | |
| 4th | Chris Smith (Manchester Township) | Republican | January 3, 1981 | R+14 | |
| 5th | Josh Gottheimer (Tenafly) | Democratic | January 3, 2017 | D+2 | |
| 6th | Frank Pallone (Long Branch) | Democratic | November 8, 1988 | D+5 | |
| 7th | Thomas Kean Jr. (Westfield) | Republican | January 3, 2023 | EVEN | |
| 8th | Rob Menendez (Jersey City) | Democratic | January 3, 2023 | D+15 | |
| 9th | Nellie Pou (North Haledon) | Democratic | January 3, 2025 | D+2 | |
| 10th | LaMonica McIver (Newark) | Democratic | September 18, 2024 | D+27 | |
| 11th | Analilia Mejia (Glen Ridge) | Democratic | April 16, 2026 | D+5 | |
| 12th | Bonnie Watson Coleman (Ewing Township) | Democratic | January 3, 2015 | D+13 | |

== Historical district boundaries ==
Below is a table of United States congressional district boundary maps for the State of New Jersey, presented chronologically. All redistricting events that took place in New Jersey in the decades between 1973 and 2013 are shown.

| Year | Statewide map |
|---|---|
| 1973–1982 | |
| 1983–1984 | |
| 1985–1992 | |
| 1993–2002 | |
| 2003–2013 | |
| 2013–2023 | |

== Obsolete districts ==
- 13th district, obsolete since the 2010 census
- 14th district, obsolete since the 1990 census
- 15th district, obsolete since the 1980 census
- At-large district, obsolete since 1843

== See also ==
- New Jersey's congressional delegations
- List of United States congressional districts
