= Josh Gottheimer =

American politician (born 1975)

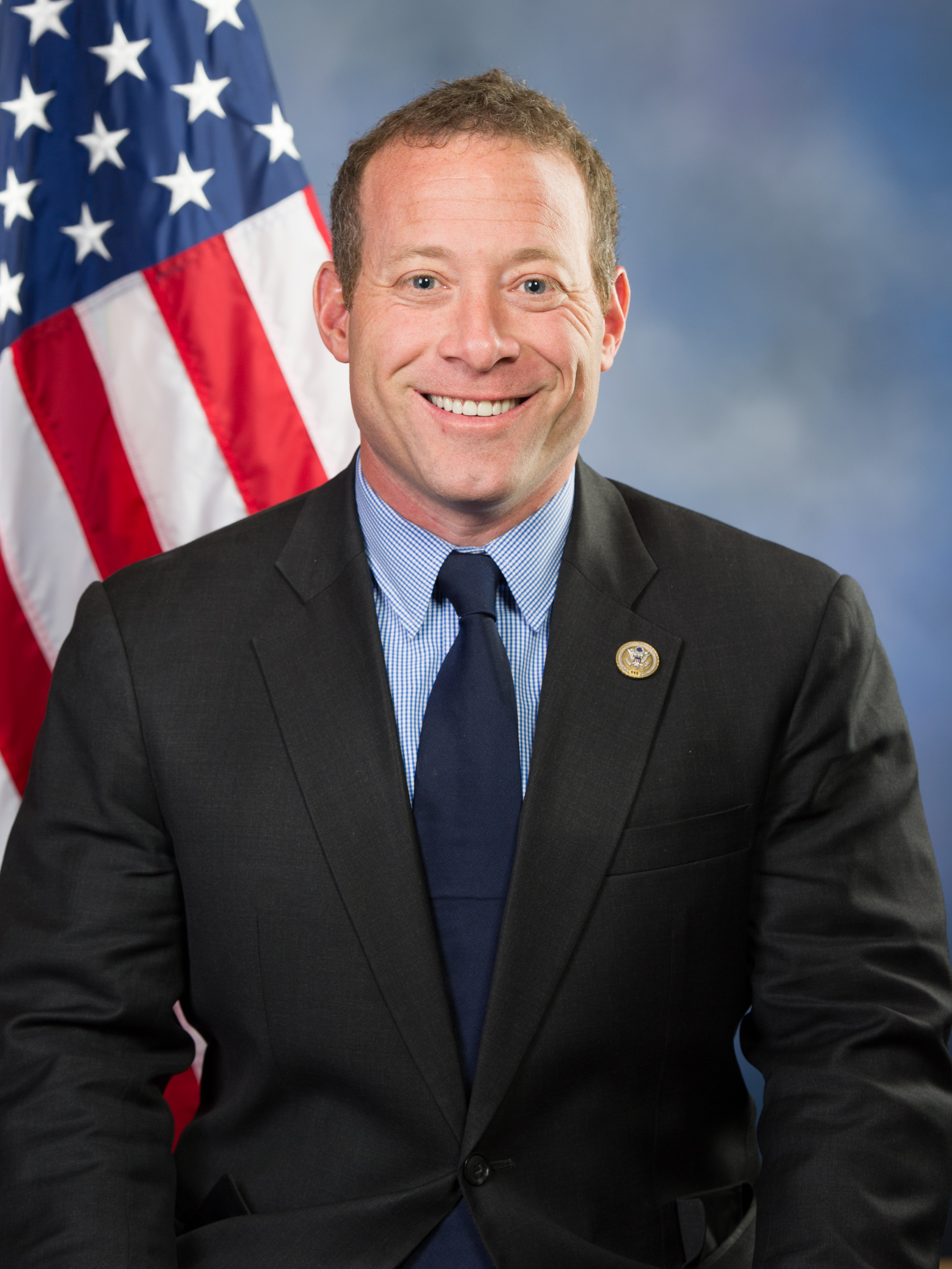
- Official portrait, 2017

Member of the U.S. House of Representatives from New Jersey's 5th district
- Incumbent
- Assumed office January 3, 2017
- Preceded by: Scott Garrett

Personal details
- Born: March 8, 1975 (age 51) Livingston, New Jersey, U.S.
- Party: Democratic
- Spouse: Marla Tusk (m. 2006)
- Children: 2
- Education: University of Pennsylvania (BA); Pembroke College, Oxford (attended); Harvard University (JD)
- Website: House website Campaign website

Joshua S. Gottheimer (/ˈɡɒthaɪmər/ GOT-hy-mər; born March 8, 1975) is an American politician serving as the U.S. representative for New Jersey's 5th congressional district since 2017. A member of the Democratic Party, Gottheimer was a speechwriter for Bill Clinton and served as an adviser to the presidential campaigns of Wesley Clark, John Kerry, and Hillary Clinton.

Prior to running for office, Gottheimer worked for Burson Cohn & Wolfe, the Federal Communications Commission, Ford Motor Company, and Microsoft.

Gottheimer's net worth was between $16.9 and $75.3 million in 2023, and he and his wife Marla Tusk, who is general counsel at the political consulting firm Tusk Strategies, reported $897,617 in joint income.

== Early life and education ==
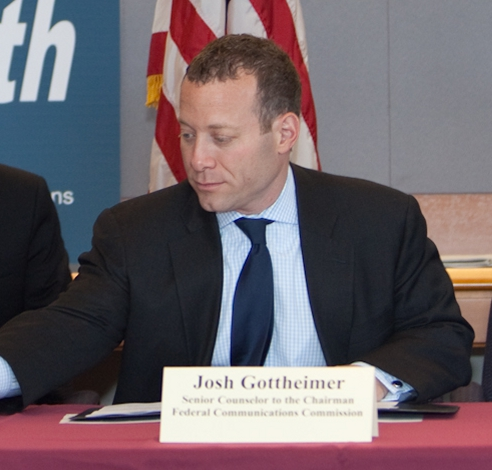
Gottheimer in 2012

Gottheimer was born in Livingston, New Jersey, on March 8, 1975. Gottheimer is the son of Jewish parents, a preschool teacher and a small business owner. Growing up, Gottheimer stocked shelves at his father's store. He was bar mitzvahed both in New Jersey and in Israel. He describes the experience as foundational. At the age of 16, Gottheimer served as a U.S. Senate page for Frank Lautenberg, a senator from New Jersey. Through high school and college, Gottheimer held internships with C-SPAN, the secretary of the Senate, and Tom Foley, the speaker of the U.S. House of Representatives.

Gottheimer graduated from West Essex High School in 1993. He attended the University of Pennsylvania, where he graduated in 1997 with a Bachelor of Arts degree in American history Phi Beta Kappa and summa cum laude. He was a member of the Alpha Epsilon Pi fraternity, master and president of the Interfraternity Council, a member of Sphinx Senior Society, and a University Scholar. While at Penn, he served on the "rapid response team" for Bill Clinton's 1996 reelection campaign. After Clinton's reelection, Gottheimer attended Pembroke College, Oxford, on a Thouron Award, studying toward a Ph.D. in modern history. In 2004, Gottheimer graduated from Harvard Law School with a Juris Doctor.

== Early career ==
Gottheimer joined the Clinton administration as a speechwriter in 1998, at age 23, working in the administration until its end in 2001. While attending law school, he worked as an adviser for Wesley Clark's 2004 presidential campaign, John Kerry's 2004 presidential campaign, and Hillary Clinton's 2008 presidential campaign. After the 2004 election, Gottheimer worked for the Ford Motor Company as their director of strategic communications, then became executive vice president at the PR firm Burson–Marsteller in 2006. From 2010 to 2012, he worked for the Federal Communications Commission, where he led a public/private initiative related to broadband internet. He subsequently became a strategist at Microsoft.

== U.S. House of Representatives ==
=== Elections ===
==== 2016 ====
In the 2016 election, Gottheimer ran against Scott Garrett, the seven-term Republican incumbent, for the House of Representatives in New Jersey's 5th congressional district. The race was characterized as New Jersey's most closely-watched and one of the most competitive, divisive, and expensive in the country.

In December 2015, the New York Times ran an article about Gottheimer's campaign, calling him a "protégé" of the Clintons and highlighting his early success fundraising, especially from politically connected donors. By June 30, 2016, Gottheimer's campaign had raised over $2.9 million, and it ultimately acquired $4.3 million by the end of the race. Outside Democratic groups would go on to spend an additional $6.4 million boosting Gottheimer. Wall Street donors who had previously supported Garrett, then chairman of the House Financial Services Committee, began migrating to Gottheimer due to Garrett's social conservatism and Gottheimer's Clinton-style approach to economics—which Gottheimer touted by referencing Ronald Reagan and downplaying his own party affiliation while presenting himself as "very fiscally conservative" at fundraisers.

Throughout the campaign, Gottheimer promoted himself as pro-business but socially progressive. He contrasted his social values with Garrett's, who Gottheimer called a "shameless bigot," especially citing reports that Garrett had refused to pay dues to the NRCC because it backed gay Republicans and other candidates who supported same-sex marriage. Gottheimer also called Garrett "anti-woman" for supporting a constitutional amendment that would outlaw abortion, and he criticized Garrett for voting against a ban on Confederate flags in military cemeteries, arguing these positions put him out of step with the district's values. The Associated Press summarized the policy distinctions of the race as Gottheimer "[pitching] himself as a fiscal conservative who is socially liberal, promising not to raise taxes while also pledging to fight for LGBT and abortion rights."

In November 2016, Gottheimer was elected with 51.1% of the vote against Scott Garrett's 46.7%, even as Republican presidential nominee Donald Trump narrowly won the district over Democrat Hillary Clinton. In all seven of his previous elections Garrett had won by at least eleven percentage points. Though Gottheimer lost in the district's share of Passaic, Sussex, and Warren counties, he led by over 30,000 votes in the more populous Bergen County portion.

==== 2018 ====
Gottheimer faced John J. McCann Jr. in his first race for re-election in 2018. In Gottheimer's first three months in office he raised $752,000, and during the second quarter of the 2018 cycle Gottheimer raised $1,500,000. NJ.com noted that anti-Trump sentiment during the midterm elections likely helped Gottheimer, as McCann echoed the president on taxes, health care, and immigration.

Gottheimer was reelected in 2018, defeating John McCann with 56% of the vote.

==== 2020 ====
In 2020, Gottheimer faced a primary challenge from, Arati Kreibich. During the campaign Gottheimer remarked that, "...if Bernie Sanders, socialized medicine and extremism are more of your view, then my opponent is probably your candidate." Gottheimer received endorsements from Nancy Pelosi and Hakeem Jeffries. In July 2020, Gottheimer won the primary election with 70.1% of the vote.

Gottheimer was elected to his third term, against Frank Pallotta, with 53 percent of the vote, running ahead of Joe Biden's 52 percent of the vote.

==== 2022 ====
The fifth district was redrawn, giving it a 6-point increase of Democratic voters, making the district safer for Gottheimer.

In May 2022, Gottheimer was accused of influencing the Republican primary, and helping Pallotta receive the 2022 Republican primary. This was common strategy where Democrats boosted the far-right Republican candidates, making it easier to defeat in the general election.

As of October 2022, Gottheimer had $14 million in campaign funds, raising $7.9 million for the 2021-2022 cycle, spending $2.5 million.

Gottheimer characterized Pallotta as a "far-right extremist" who would undermine the congressman's bipartisan, "commonsense" approach to legislating. Gottheimer was elected to his fourth term in November 2022, defeating Frank Pallotta, with 54.7% of the vote.

==== 2024 ====
Gottheimer announced he would seek re-election to his fifth term in February 2024. By early October, Gottheimer's campaign funds were at $20.3 million, raising $9.3 million for the 2023-2024 cycle.

In March 2024, the day after Mary Jo-Ann Guinchard won the Bergen County GOP line, Gottheimer began criticizing her as a "right-wing extremist" and "MAGA Mary," claiming that she was opposed to abortion, against red-flag laws, and associated with "anti-government extremist groups and January 6th sympathizers."

Gottheimer was elected to his fifth term in November 2024, defeating Guinchard, with 54.5% of the vote.

==== 2026 ====
In 2025, upon losing the gubernatorial primary to Mikie Sherrill, Gottheimer made it clear that he would seek re-election to the House in 2026.

=== Committee assignments ===
For the 119th Congress:

- Committee on Financial Services
  - Subcommittee on Capital Markets
  - Subcommittee on Digital Assets, Financial Technology, and Artificial Intelligence
  - Subcommittee on National Security, Illicit Finance and International Financial Institutions
- Permanent Select Committee on Intelligence
  - Subcommittee on National Intelligence Enterprise
  - Subcommittee on National Security Agency and Cyber (Ranking Member)

=== Caucus memberships ===
- Black Maternal Health Caucus
- Congressional Asian Pacific American Caucus
- Congressional Equality Caucus
- Future Forum
- New Democrat Coalition
- Climate Solutions Caucus
- Problem Solvers Caucus
- Congressional Coalition on Adoption
- Congressional Blockchain Caucus
- Congressional Caucus for the Equal Rights Amendment
- Congressional Ukraine Caucus
- Rare Disease Caucus
- Blue Dog Coalition

== 2025 gubernatorial campaign ==
On November 15, 2024, Gottheimer announced that he would run for governor of New Jersey in 2025, seeking to succeed outgoing Democratic Governor Phil Murphy.

Like other candidates for governor in 2025, Gottheimer positioned his campaign as addressing affordability; he especially cited high property taxes, calling for a 15% reduction. Gottheimer contributed $9.6 million from his congressional campaign funds to a Super PAC called Affordable New Jersey, which immediately began purchasing ads in support of his gubernatorial bid. In a February 2025 Democratic primary debate, opponents Ras Baraka and Steve Fulop criticized Gottheimer's support for the Laken Riley Act, which he defended by saying "If you’re a murderer, a rapist, you break into people’s homes, you shouldn’t be here."

Gottheimer placed fourth in the Democratic primary on June 10, 2025, receiving 11.8% of the vote and losing to Democratic congresswoman Mikie Sherrill. Gottheimer lost every county besides his home county, Bergen, where he came in first with 37% of the vote versus Sherrill's 23%.

== Political positions ==
Gottheimer is considered to be a centrist Democrat. He is a member of the Blue Dog Coalition. He described himself as "socially liberal, fiscally conservative, and passionately centrist" in favor of compromise guided by his Jewish values in 2016. During Donald Trump's first presidency, Gottheimer voted in line with Trump only 38% of the time, but more often than any other Democrat in Congress. During 2021 and 2022, Gottheimer voted with President Joe Biden's stated position 100% of the time, according to a FiveThirtyEight analysis. In 2023, of 54 measures "on which Biden expressed a clear position," Gottheimer voted for Biden's position 86% of the time.

Gottheimer is considered steadfastly pro-Israel. Haaretz described him as "one of the [Democratic] party's most outspoken supports of Israel," the New York Times called him "a staunch supporter of the U.S.-Israel relationship," and Politico referred to him as an "Israel hawk."

Gottheimer is an outspoken critic of democratic socialism, saying "The DSA are not Democrats. They’re socialists, who want to hijack the Democratic Party," and calling them "anti-American, anti-Democratic." In June 2026, Gottheimer was one of 10 House Democrats to sign onto the Promise to America, a pro-capitalist, anti-socialist pledge, after three candidates backed by the DSA won Democratic congressional primaries in New York. In July 2026, Gottheimer declared that he did not consider New York City mayor Zohran Mamdani, who is seen as a leader of the democratic socialist movement, to be a Democrat.

=== Social issues ===
==== Abortion ====
Gottheimer has been vocal for abortion rights, legislatively voting for Women's Health Protection Act, Ensuring Access to Abortion Act; voting against Supporting Pregnant and Parenting Women and Families Act; introducing Freedom to Decide Act; and cosponsoring Stop Anti-abortion Disinformation Act. Gottheimer condemned the Supreme Court's Dobbs v. Jackson Women's Health Organization decision, which overturned Roe v. Wade, stating, "We must always oppose any attempt...[to] stand between a woman, her doctor, and her faith, when making personal health care decisions..."

==== LGBTQ rights ====
Gottheimer supports same-sex marriage, saying, "I think that people should be able to love and marry whomever they want." Legislatively, Gottheimer voted for the Respect for Marriage Act and introduced the Freedom from Discrimination in Credit Act (which passed under the Equality Act) and the Elder Pride Protection Act.

==== Gun control ====
Gottheimer supports gun control measures like red flag laws and raising the age to purchase a semi-automatic rifle. Gottheimer has asked House Republicans to help pass multiple gun laws, saying there was "no reason" not to pass the laws. Gottheimer voted for the Bipartisan Safer Communities Act; voted against the Concealed Carry Reciprocity Act; introduced the ALYSSA act, which required silent panic alarms in schools and increased investment in School Resource Officers; and helped to pass a renewal of the Federal Assault Weapons Ban.

==== Drugs ====
In 2019, Gottheimer stated his opposition to the legalization of recreational marijuana. The statement came after he voted for a bill that would end the federal penalization of banks that serve the cannabis industry.

==== Food ====
On May 22, 2023, Gottheimer wrote to the Department of Agriculture, suggesting it revise expiration-date guidelines to reduce food waste. Gottheimer simultaneously supported the Food Date Labeling Act to "establish an easy-to-understand, uniform food date labeling system" that would also "allow food to be sold or donated after a 'best if used by' date," in order to support food pantries and the needy.

In July 2024, Gottheimer joined New Jersey state senators Brian Stack and Nicholas Scutari to promote the federal Stop SCAMS Act, a bill he introduced to protect food assistance beneficiaries from scammers. The senators, noting that such scams had affected 6,200 New Jerseyans over the past two years, announced corresponding state-level legislation — both bills mandating the modernization of benefit EBT cards by replacing magnetic strips with EMV.

==== Health care ====
In 2017, Gottheimer explained that he supported some aspects of the Affordable Care Act (allowing adults to stay on their parents' health insurance until age 26 and requiring coverage for individuals with pre-existing conditions) but expressed a desire to "fix" aspects such as the medical device tax and the Cadillac tax.

Gottheimer felt that the Trump Administration's American Health Care Act of 2017 did not reflect an effort "to reach across the aisle" and would raise healthcare costs for senior citizens.

As of 2019, Gottheimer opposed single-payer healthcare.

In 2022, Gottheimer voted for the Right to Contraception Act, which "guarantee[d] the right to get and use birth control, including emergency contraception."

In February 2024, following an Alabama Supreme Court ruling that decided frozen embryos had rights as children, Gottheimer said, "What Alabama is doing, what many states are doing, what many people in Congress unfortunately are doing, they are conducting a war on women's healthcare and a war on women overall." At the same time, Gottheimer introduced the Securing Access to Fertility Everywhere (SAFE) Act, which would "protect families, doctors and medical facilities from prosecution involving any IVF treatment [such as wrongful death charges for transporting embryonic cells]," and publicly supported Sen. Tammy Duckworth's Right to Build Families Act, which would secure access to IVF treatments.

In June 2024, Gottheimer (a member of the Black Maternal Health Caucus) was joined by Rep. Lauren Underwood at Hackensack University Medical Center in support of the Black Maternal Health Momnibus Act, a 13-bill package aimed at improving social and institutional barriers to maternal health.

==== Immigration ====
In March 2019, Gottheimer co-sponsored the Dream and Promise Act of 2019, joining, one week after the bill was introduced, more than 200 other congresspeople in doing so. According to The Record, the bill would have granted, "...permanent legal protection to more than 2 million undocumented immigrants," including Dreamers and those with temporarily protected status and DED protections. Speaking retrospectively in 2023, Gottheimer criticized the House Speaker's ability to unilaterally block a vote on any bill (arguing it "paralyzed" bipartisan progress), in part because, "That's what killed the immigration bill in 2019...[which] would have provided a path to citizenship for Dreamers," as, ultimately, "We had 300 co-sponsors but...Paul Ryan would not bring it to the floor".

In June 2019, Gottheimer supported a $4.6 billion emergency border aid package, which provided $1 billion for migrant shelter and food and $3 billion for childcare, because he did not want to "let the perfect be the enemy of the good". The bill especially angered progressives, in part because it set aside $280 million for ICE and $1 billion for Customs and Border Protection, resulting in 95 Democratic representatives voting against it.

In October 2023, Gottheimer backed a bill by Sen. Lindsey Graham that packaged together funds for increased domestic border security with funds for military assistance to Ukraine in its defense against Russia; Congress ended its session in December 2023 without voting on it. In February 2024, Gottheimer then co-sponsored Rep. Brian Fitzpatrick's Defending Borders, Defending Democracies Act, which would have reinstated President Trump's "Remain in Mexico" policy and blocked the use of federal funds to transfer migrants "unless it is for adjudicating their immigration case."

In January 2025, Gottheimer voted for the Laken Riley Act (after it was amended by the Senate; he was absent for the original House vote); he was one of 46 House Democrats, and the only Democrat from New Jersey, to join all House Republicans in supporting the bill. He later expressed reservations at the idea of the government "go[ing] into churches and schools to round up innocent people". Gottheimer later declined to comment when asked about the bill applying to non-violent offenses and targeting migrants accused but not convicted of crimes.

In January 2026, following a surge of ICE agents in Minneapolis and the killings of Renée Nicole Good and Alex Pretti, Gottheimer voted against a bill which would have funded the Department of Homeland Security, remarking "What we’re seeing in Minnesota is deeply disturbing. I believe in keeping out gang members, criminals and terrorists, but we certainly don’t need inadequately trained ICE agents, with zero guardrails, roaming the streets and Home Depots acting like vigilantes," and expressing hope for a future bill that included "accountability measures." On January 28, Gottheimer announced the ICE Standards Act, which would standardize initial and annual training for agents, require agents to prioritize de-escalation and risk minimization, mandate the use of body and dashboard cameras, and restrict enforcement at sensitive locations like schools or voting sites unless exigent circumstances exist. On February 3, Gottheimer voted for an appropriations bill that temporarily funded the DHS without any reforms to ICE. He was one of 21 Democrats and the only Democrat from New Jersey to join House Republicans in passing the bill.

In May 2026, protests erupted around the Delaney Hall immigrant detention center in Newark following detainees having launched a hunger and labor strike to call attention to the facility's conditions. In late May, Gottheimer along with minority leader Hakeem Jeffries and Reps. LaMonica McIver and Rob Menendez attended the facility for an oversight visit. In June 2026, Gottheimer praised Gov. Mikie Sherrill's decision to deploy state police to manage protestors, calling it "decisive action to protect the community from out-of-state, lawless protestors at Delaney Hall Detention Facility" and arguing that protestors crossed the line from peaceful demonstration into unlawful conduct. Other Democratic politicians, including Newark mayor Ras Baraka, criticized Sherril's response as unnecessary and escalatory.

==== Congestion pricing ====
Gottheimer has staunchly opposed congestion pricing in New York City, one of the most polluted and congested areas in the world. Gottheimer's rationales for opposing congestion pricing have been that the revenue is not directed to the PATH rail system or New Jersey Transit, that most opinions offered in the MTA's virtual hearings were by his analysis opposed to congestion pricing, or that increased emissions near the George Washington Bridge would cause cancer in New Jersey children.

Several times, Gottheimer introduced legislation, with either Rep. Jeff Van Drew or Rep. Mike Lawler, to withhold funding to New York's Metropolitan Transportation Authority unless the pricing scheme introduced exemptions for drivers from New Jersey or from portions of New York City outside Manhattan.

In January 2024, Gottheimer produced a study estimating that the congestion pricing plan (as approved by the MTA) would generate $3.4 billion in revenue per year, exceeding New York City's $1 billion target; the study also projected that the plan would still raise about $1.5 billion yearly even if every eligible crossing from New Jersey into Manhattan was excluded. Gottheimer, furthermore, warned that the Port Authority could lose around $83 million in tolls collected per year from a decrease in Lincoln and Holland Tunnel crossings. Gottheimer ultimately argued these findings demonstrated that New Jersey crossings ought to be exempted from (what he called) the "congestion tax". John J. McCarthy, the MTA chief of policy and external relations, said of Gottheimer, "here he is again with yet another publicity stunt fighting for the status quo".

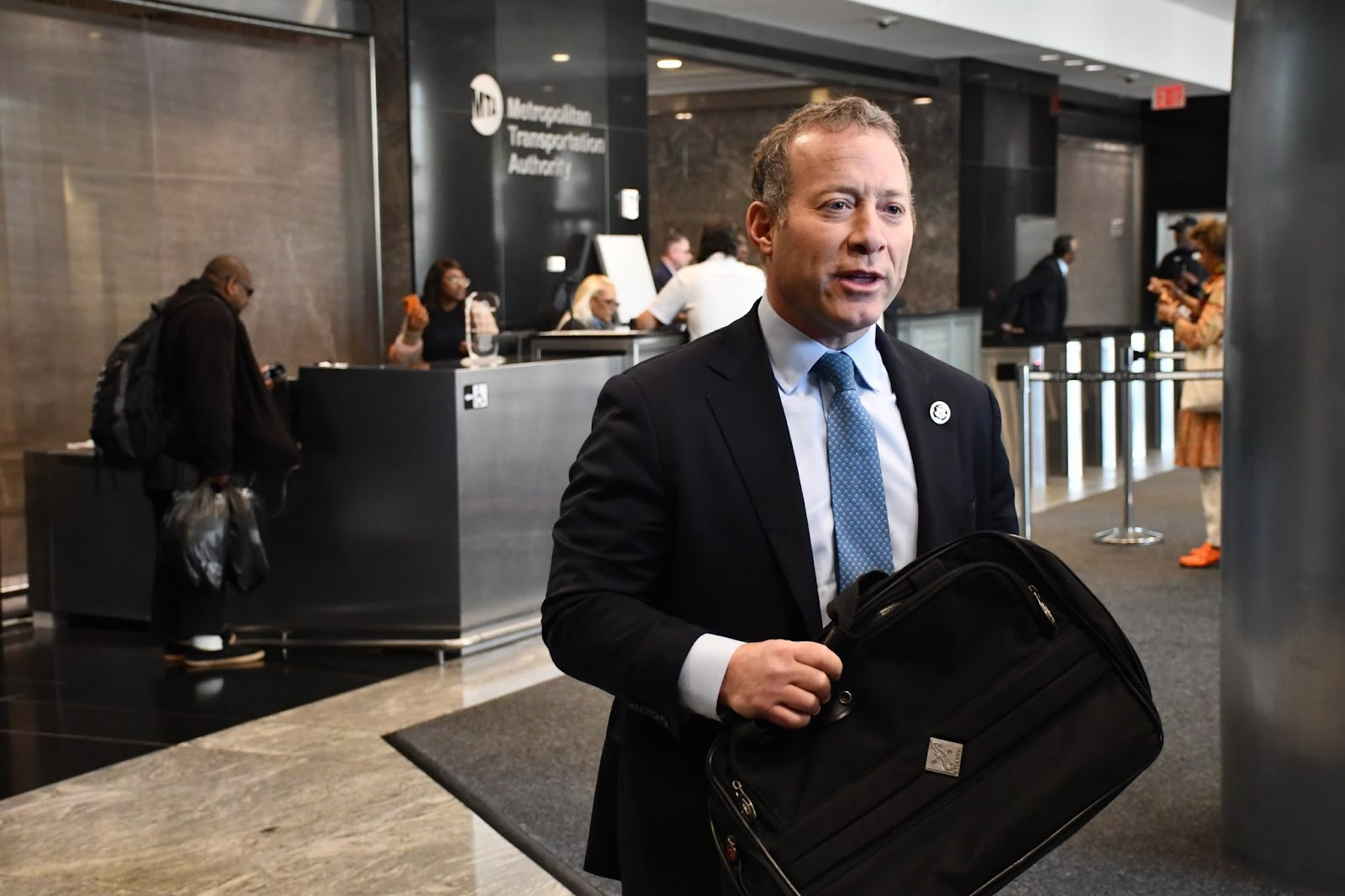
Gottheimer visits the MTA office in Manhattan to request a meeting with CEO Janno Lieber.

In April 2024, as the plan was set to begin on June 15, the MTA announced that New Jersey (especially Bergen and Hudson counties) would receive a cut of the funds generated from congestion pricing; Gottheimer rebuked the new measure as insufficient. The following week, Gottheimer visited the MTA headquarters to demand, unsuccessfully, that the agency provide financial documents that justified the congestion pricing fee; joined Rep. Nicole Malliotakis to introduce bipartisan legislation that would block the congestion pricing plan from taking effect; and wrote to the House Transportation and Infrastructure Committee, requesting that they arrange a hearing on the MTA's plan and subpoena MTA CEO Janno Lieber to appear. In May 2024, Gottheimer and Rep. Anthony D’Esposito introduced legislation that, unless the congestion pricing plan was terminated, would bar Lieber from using federal funds to pay for work-related travel by car, which was to be exempt from congestion tolls; Gottheimer described the MTA funding car travel, in light of its support for congestion pricing, as a "for thee and not for me" attitude, saying that "Lieber seems to think he's above it all."

When New York Governor Kathy Hochul indefinitely paused Manhattan congestion pricing in June 2024, Gottheimer celebrated. Hochul resumed the implementation in January 2025, leading to a feud with the Trump administration; Gottheimer called the tolls "outrageous".

==== Law enforcement ====
Gottheimer cosponsored the Public Safety Officer Pandemic Response Act of 2020, voted for the Thin Blue Line Act, and supported the Never Forget the Heroes Act.

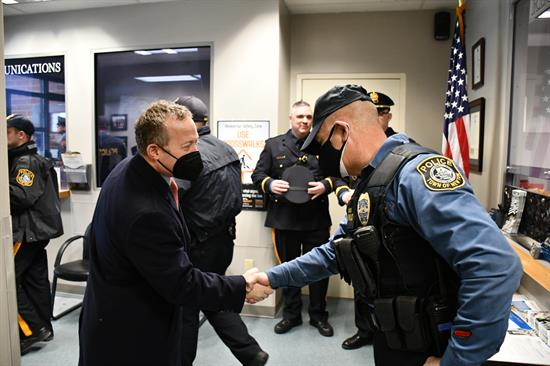
Gottheimer visits Newton, NJ police department, 2022

In January 2022, Gottheimer introduced the Invest to Protect Act, which aimed to provide $200 million in funds over five years to smaller police departments. The spending would be targeted at provisions such as officer safety and de-escalation training, body cameras, recruitment and retention, and mental health resources. Gottheimer led efforts to more quickly bring the bill to a vote (such as trying to package it with a July assault weapons ban); CNN linked Gottheimer's push to crime and policing being an election issue and, therefore, vulnerable Democrats hoping to pass police-funding legislation before the 2022 midterms. The Invest to Protect Act passed the House in September 2022 but failed to advance further than a unanimous consent passage in the Senate. In May 2023, Gottheimer reintroduced the bill in the 118th Congress.

In June 2024, Gottheimer announced an amendment to the package funding the Department of Homeland Security through 2025 that would set aside $620 million for additional security at the 2026 World Cup games—eight matches of which, including the final, would be held at MetLife Stadium in East Rutherford. The funds would pay for increased fire, medical, and law enforcement personnel locally and at affected transit facilities.

=== Climate change ===
In September 2022, Gottheimer touted that the Bipartisan Infrastructure Law of 2021 (which he helped develop and push through Congress) and Inflation Reduction Act of 2022 (which he voted for) were "seismic progress" in fighting climate change. Gottheimer argued that the infrastructure bill funded environmental projects such coastal resiliency, ecosystem repairs, and electric-vehicle infrastructure, while the Inflation Reduction Act provided "serious long-term investments in alternative energy" and incentives for states, communities, and individuals to "rethink how they approach energy."

=== Artificial intelligence ===
In February 2025, Gottheimer and Rep. Darin LaHood introduced a bill that would ban DeepSeek, a Chinese artificial intelligence app, from federal government devices.

In his 2025 bid to be the Democratic nominee for governor of New Jersey, Gottheimer released a campaign ad that used AI to portray the congressman as a shirtless boxer sparring with Donald Trump in a boxing ring.

In August 2025, Gottheimer introduced the Unleashing AI Innovation in Financial Services Act, which "would direct the Securities and Exchange Commission, the Federal Reserve, the Consumer Financial Protection Bureau and other federal financial agencies to create in-house AI innovation labs," that would act as sandboxes to test AI projects "without unnecessary or unduly burdensome regulation or expectation of enforcement actions."

In December 2025, Gottheimer, Rep. Ted Lieu, and Rep. Valerie Foushee were chosen by leadership to chair the House Democratic Commission on AI and the Innovation Economy, which aimed to "work with AI companies, stakeholders and congressional committees that oversee aspects of the sector to help develop policy expertise." Sludge criticized Gottheimer and the committee leadership as having "[deep] ties to Big Tech and AI, from holding millions of dollars in tech stock to the contributions they’ve raised for their campaigns and the Republican-backed deregulation bills they've signed onto."

In February 2026, Gottheimer introduced The AI Workforce Training Act, which would create a federal tax credit for companies that train their employees in AI skills. Businesses could claim a credit for 30% of AI training expenses, up to $2,500 per employee per year.

In the lead up to the 2026 midterm elections, Anthropic ran ads supporting Gottheimer while Leading the Future, a pro-AI SuperPAC, endorsed him.

In September 2026, Gottheimer announced three new bills focused on AI security. He and Republican Rep. Mike Lawler introduced the Stop Rogue AI Act, which would task the National Institute of Standards and Technology with developing national standards for the control of AI agents, and The American AI Security Act, which would require developers of certain advanced AI models to provide the National Security Agency with access to evaluate the programs prior to their release. Gottheimer also introduced The China FIREWALL Act with Republican Rep. Nick LaLota, which would expand on a DeepSeek ban to prohibit all Chinese-developed AI models from government-issued devices and bar federal agencies from purchasing software that relies on those models. At the time, Gottheimer argued AI offers positive opportunities but must be handled appropriately, lest the threats outweigh the benefits, saying: "This can't be the Wild West...We gotta win the race, but in the right way."

=== Economy ===
==== Labor ====
Seeking to stave off a strike during the 2022 railroad labor dispute, Gottheimer, along with 79 House Republicans and all but 8 House Democrats, voted for a measure that forced rail companies and their unions to agree to a tentative agreement reached in September, which included "a 24-percent increase in wages over five years, more schedule flexibility and one additional paid day off". The deal had been rejected by several rail unions because it lacked paid sick leave.

In December 2023, Gottheimer pushed for bipartisan legislation to fund the FAA so they could hire and train more air traffic controllers, citing a 3,000-staffer national shortage and only 54% of essential tristate-area positions being filled. To this end, Gottheimer signed a bipartisan letter "demanding" that any bill to fund the FAA must stipulate (and include money for) the hiring of air traffic personnel to capacity, then he introduced it to leaders of the House Transportation and Senate Commerce committees. He also sponsored legislation that would begin a Government Accountability Office investigation into flight delays at airports in New Jersey, New York, and Connecticut.

==== Cryptocurrency ====
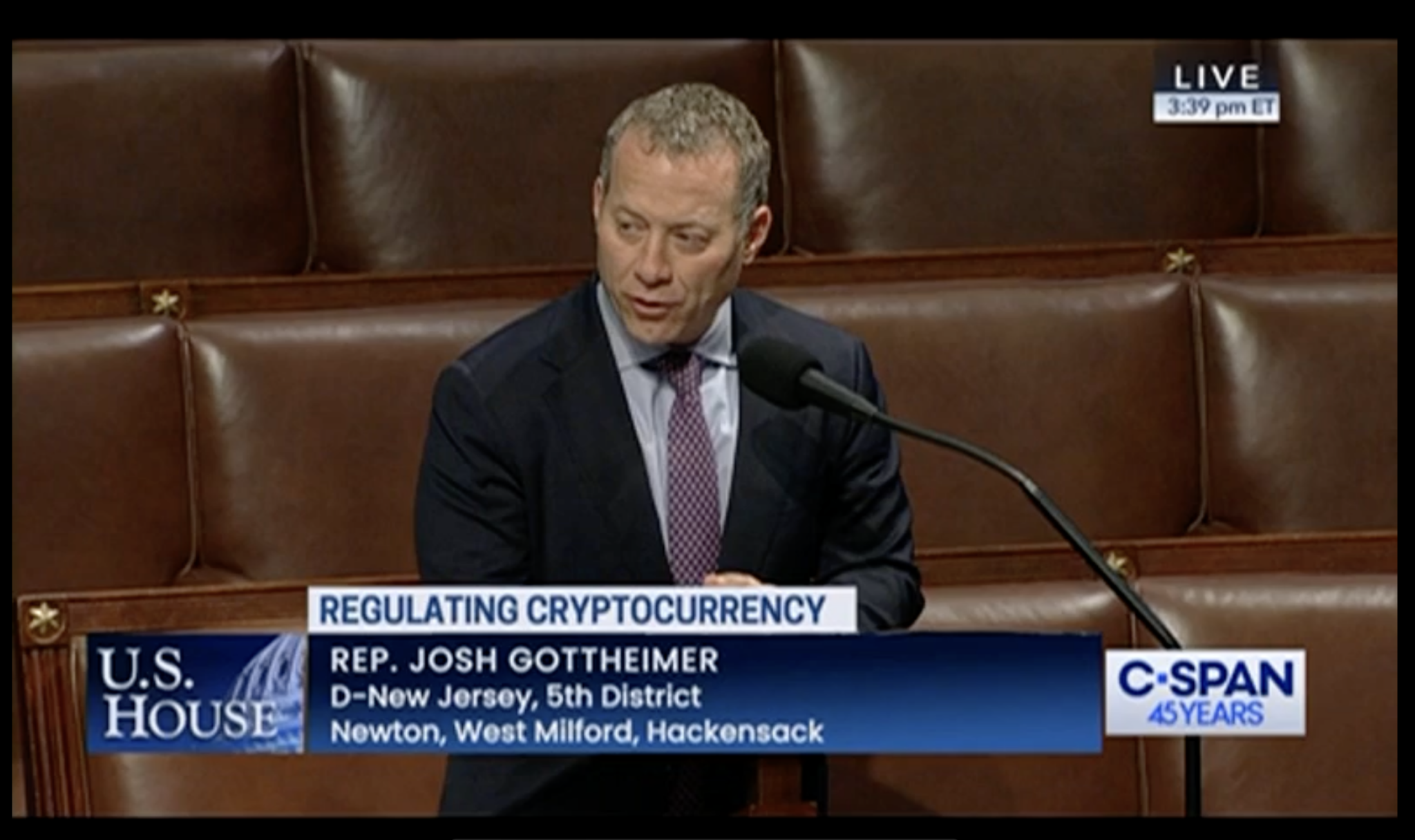
Gottheimer speaks on the House floor in support of FIT21 cryptocurrency framework.

In February 2022, Gottheimer drafted legislation to define digital currencies as stablecoins if they could be backed one-for-one by U.S. dollars. Later, in July 2023, Gottheimer voted in the House Financial Services committee to advance a Republican-led bill that would establish regulations for stablecoins by authorizing the SEC to oversee digital assets while also installing new restrictions on the agency. Gottheimer and five other Democratic committee members approved the bill, bucking Democratic chairwoman Maxine Waters who argued it had loopholes and was "a wish list of Big Crypto."

Gottheimer helped push the Republican-led Financial Innovation and Technology for the 21st Century (FIT21) Act through the House Financial Services Committee in May 2024; the bill eventually passed in the House later that month. The bill simplified digital currency regulation and was purported to enhance investor protections while encouraging cryptocurrency companies to establish themselves in the United States rather than abroad; in a press release, Gottheimer described the bill as establishing rules to guide entrepreneurs and protect consumers. Later the same week, Gottheimer led a bipartisan group of congresspeople in writing to SEC Chairman Gary Gensler pushing for the approval of spot Ethereum ETFs, which they argued provided investors with a transparent and regulated entryway into cryptocurrency trading.

==== Taxes ====
On April 15, 2017, Gottheimer announced that he would be introducing the "Anti-Moocher Bill", under which states receiving more federal dollars than they contribute to the national treasury would pay their "fair share", asking: "Why should Alabama get our federal tax dollars and get a free ride, while we're left holding the bag with higher property taxes? It just doesn't make sense." In October 2017, Gottheimer and Rep. Leonard Lance introduced the Return on Investment Accountability Act, which they wrote would, "...give tax credits to individuals whose states get less funding from the federal government than they pay in aggregate".

In August 2023, Gottheimer proposed a plan that would provide families with tax credits to be used towards the administrative and equipment costs of youth sports, as well as creating a federal grant program to invest in recreational youth sports programs and organizations.

===== SALT deduction =====
Gottheimer is a proponent of restoring the full State And Local Tax (SALT) deduction, which was capped at $10,000 by the 2017 Tax Cuts and Jobs Act.

In January 2018, Gottheimer was the first New Jersey lawmaker to propose that towns establish charitable funds for municipal expenditures that residents could donate to and, thereafter, receive an equal credit on their property tax bills—allowing homeowners to deduct their full property tax expenses as charitable contributions on federal tax forms. The workaround was signed into law by Governor Phil Murphy after passing in the state legislature in April 2018, but it was ultimately blocked by an IRS ruling.

Gottheimer has made numerous attempts to uncap the SALT deduction, such as last-minute efforts to negotiate its reduction in 2017; attempts to include the deduction's restoration in Build Back Better legislation circa February 2022; and, beginning in February 2023, leading a bipartisan caucus devoted to the issue.

In February 2024, Gottheimer publicly promoted a bill that would have doubled the SALT deduction cap to $20,000, but, later that week, he abstained from a procedural vote (which failed) that would have brought the bill to the floor; a 'yes' vote would also have allowed consideration of a Republican resolution denouncing the Biden administration's energy policies.

==== Infrastructure ====
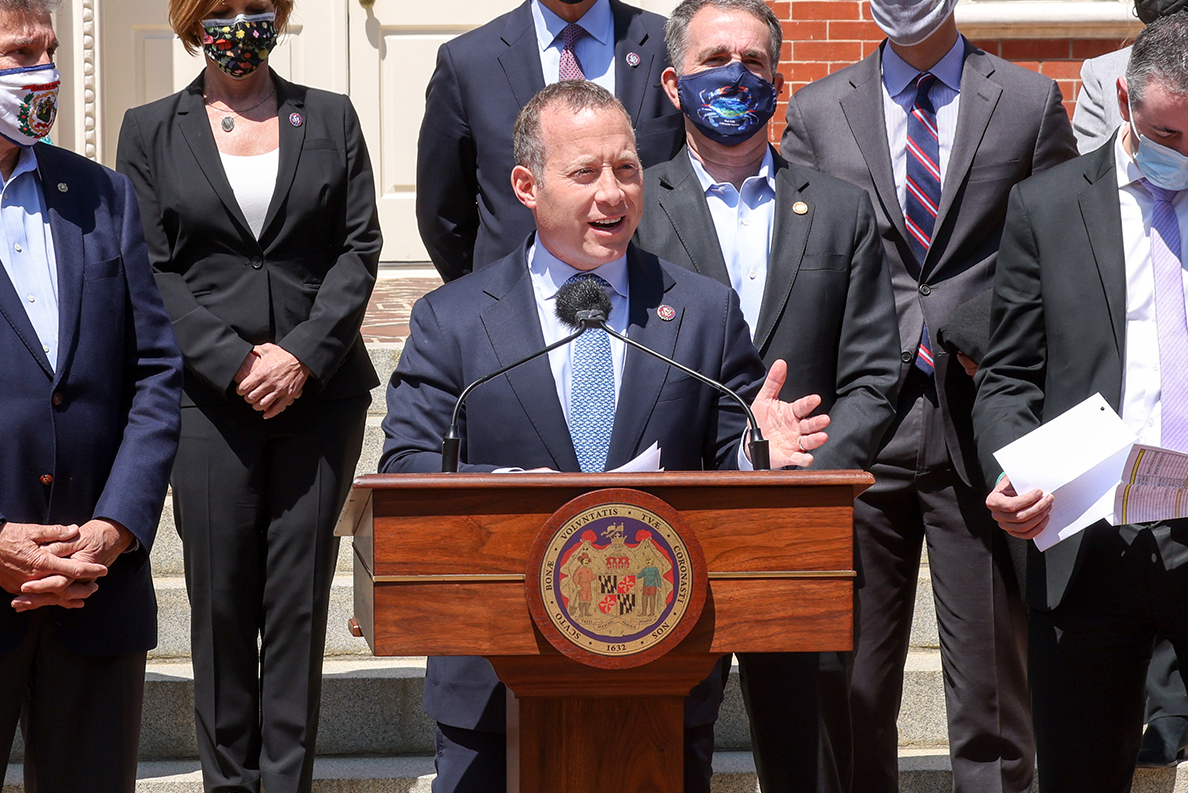
Gottheimer speaks at a Maryland infrastructure press conference, April 2021

Gottheimer supported measures to restore the Lackawanna Cut-Off and the Gateway Tunnel.

In August 2021, Gottheimer led a group of conservative Democrats, dubbed "The Unbreakable Nine," to separate $1 trillion in physical infrastructure funding from a $3.5 trillion social infrastructure package that was critical to the Biden Administration's Build Back Better agenda. Progressive Democrats preferred that the two be voted on together so that the bundle was more appealing to members of Congress who supported the physical infrastructure investments but would not vote for the social spending on its own. Ultimately, the two packages were voted on separately, with the Bipartisan Infrastructure Bill passing and the Build Back Better Act failing.

In January 2024, Gottheimer campaigned against electric car manufacturers excluding AM radio from newly produced vehicles. At a media event near a Tesla dealership on Route 17, Gottheimer was joined by the New Jersey Broadcasters Association director to argue that AM radio is still widely used and necessary in emergency situations; he also warned that, if unregulated, car manufacturers may eventually charge fees for all infotainment options.

In March 2024, while touting $1.8 million in federal grants to improve local pedestrian safety acquired as a result of the Bipartisan Infrastructure Bill, Gottheimer announced that he would support three acts to address pedestrian safety: the PHASE Act, which "directs the National Institute of Standards and Technology to come up with new solutions to address distracted driving and will implement pedestrian-friendly infrastructure for cities and towns with a new grant program"; the Sarah Debbink Langenkamp Active Transportation Safety Act, which "works toward giving state and local governments funds for bike and walking paths"; and the Complete Streets Act, which "focuses on more accessible transportation options for children, seniors and people with disabilities...direct[ing] states to find new approaches to pedestrian travel."

In April 2024, Gottheimer introduced the Enhancing Transparency from Airlines Act, which would codify Department of Transportation rules that require airlines "to provide direct refunds rather than vouchers following a 'significant diversion' in flights...includ[ing] a three-hour delay for domestic flights and a six-hour delay for international trips," while also "requiring airlines to communicate all fees upfront."

=== Governance and ethics ===
==== Congressional stock trading ====
Gottheimer has been criticized for inappropriately handling stock trades during his time as a congressman. In August 2022, filings revealed that Gottheimer failed to report an exchange of stocks in his portfolio within the mandated 45-day period; in September 2022, analysis indicated that Gottheimer made, "...trades involving 326 companies and 43 potential conflicts of interest," over a three-year period; and in April 2023, it was shown that Gottheimer sold shares in impacted companies before and during the 2023 banking crisis. His team has stated, "Prior to taking office, Josh turned over management of his portfolio to a third party and only receives statements of prior transactions".

In February 2022, Gottheimer pledged to establish a blind trust to manage his assets; however, as of August 2022, he had yet to create one, and as of June 2024, the electronic statement that was cited to substantiate this pledge had been removed from Gottheimer's House website.

==== Government shutdowns ====
In January 2018, Gottheimer was one of six House Democrats who voted with Republicans for a short-term spending bill in an attempt to stave off a federal government shutdown.

In February 2022, with the previous year's continuing resolution set to expire on the 18th, Gottheimer was the only Democrat to vote against a stopgap bill to extend funding through March 11; the measure passed. Gottheimer argued, "Stop-gap measures for short-term government funding weaken our military and harm...the ability for our states to plan critical infrastructure projects, and much more," so, since there were "more than 200 hours" before the deadline, Congress should have negotiated towards an omnibus deal "until the last possible minute".

In September 2023, facing the possibility of a shutdown on the 30th, Gottheimer and the rest of the Problem Solvers Caucus endorsed a continuing resolution plan to fund the government until January 2024, which included aid to Ukraine, disaster-relief funds, and enhanced border security. Gottheimer also suggested using a discharge petition if other funding methods failed. He later co-headlined a No Labels-organized virtual "exclusive congressional update" to discuss this “commonsense bipartisan framework” aimed at preventing a government shutdown despite “partisan actors on both sides of the aisle”.

In January 2024, facing another possibility of a shutdown, Gottheimer urged Speaker Mike Johnson to "support a six-week government funding extension to allow time for a longer-term budget deal to be reached". Gottheimer blamed the looming shutdown on "ultra-right extremists", and, on January 18, voted for a successful stopgap bill to fund the government through a deadline in March.

=== Foreign policy ===
==== China ====
In June 2021, Gottheimer co-sponsored a resolution led by Rep. Mike Gallagher which condemned the Chinese Communist Party for human rights violations. The resolution cited instances such as the annexation of Tibet and the treatment of Uyghurs in Xinjiang, concluding that the group "looks forward to the day that the CCP no longer exists."

In September 2021, Gottheimer and Rep. Claudia Tenney led a bipartisan group of congresspeople in writing a letter to Secretary of State Antony Blinken, warning that the Chinese-Iranian alliance was antithetical to American national security interests. In particular, they noted that China disregarded international sanctions on Iran by importing Iranian oil and, according to the group, "bolstered" Iran's ballistic missile program while "complicating" efforts to keep at bay its nuclear program.

Gottheimer has criticized TikTok and supported banning the platform should it remain under ownership by a Chinese corporation. In March 2023, Gottheimer argued that TikTok posed a national security threat, alleging that TikTok's parent company, ByteDance, provided data from its users to the Chinese Communist Party. After Rep. Jamaal Bowman publicly opposed a potential TikTok ban, Gottheimer remarked that, "Anyone defending TikTok is either too caught up in being a social media celebrity or they've been brainwashed by the Chinese government's propaganda." In November 2023, shortly after the start of the Gaza war, Gottheimer and Rep. Don Bacon, joined by ADL leader Jonathan Greenblatt, announced the Stop Hate Act, which aimed to require social media companies to address individuals using their platforms for terroristic purposes; Gottheimer said that, "China is pro-Hamas, so it only makes sense for them to push anti-Israel, anti-American content on TikTok" aimed at young people. At the same time, Gottheimer called on the Department of Justice to register TikTok as a foreign agent. Later in November 2023, Gottheimer criticized a trend of TikTok videos "sympathizing" with Osama bin Laden and his reasoning behind orchestrating the 9/11 attacks, arguing again that it was Chinese propaganda, and therefore, "TikTok must be banned or sold to an American company." In February 2024, Gottheimer joined Rep. Dan Crenshaw in sending a letter to Secretary of Commerce Gina Raimondo requesting that the Department of Commerce add ByteDance to its export control list. In March 2024, Gottheimer was an original sponsor of (and voted for) a bill that would ban TikTok in the United States unless it was sold to a company that does not operate in a foreign adversary country. Gottheimer led a letter co-signed by fiver other House Democrats asking Trump to comply with the TikTok divest-or-ban law and not grant further extensions to it, in June 2025.

Throughout late 2023 and 2024, Gottheimer supported Republican-led, Democrat-led, and bipartisan bills calling for aid to Taiwan and other Indo-Pacific allies in defense against China and its influence, especially in the South China Sea. This aid, however, was always tied to military aid for Israel in its Gaza war and/or Ukraine for its defense against Russia; in November 2023, Gottheimer supported a bill funding only Israel at the expense of waiting for the opportunity to support all three causes together.

==== Iran ====
Gottheimer opposed the 2015 Iran nuclear deal (saying he would have voted against it had he been in Congress at the time) and approved of President Trump exiting the agreement in 2018. One of Gottheimer's primary concerns with the deal was that, "...it didn't address the elephant in the room, which is [Iran's] support for terror."

In January 2020, in the wake of the Trump administration having ordered a drone strike to assassinate Qasem Soleimani, Gottheimer said that the Iranian general had "imminent plans to attack Americans" making it necessary to "act deliberately to contain the threat posed by Iran"; Gottheimer later reiterated that "I know what I believe: We killed a terrorist," and "we were responding to years of action by Iran." At the same time, Gottheimer expressed his support for President Trump intensifying economic sanctions against Iran. Later in the month, Gottheimer was one of eight House Democrats to vote against a war powers resolution that, in reaction to the assassination, emphasized the president's responsibility to consult Congress before engaging in military hostilities.

Throughout 2022, Gottheimer opposed the Biden administration as it attempted to reenter a nuclear agreement with Iran. In March, when the measure was brought up in diplomatic talks, Gottheimer said it would "make zero sense" to remove the Islamic Revolutionary Guard Corps (IRGC) from the State Department's list of designated foreign terrorist organizations, arguing it would further enable Iran to fund terrorism through its proxies. In April, Gottheimer led a group of 18 House Democrats expressing concerns about delisting the IRGC and protesting Russia's involvement as a mediator in the negotiations. In August, Gottheimer led a group of lawmakers in denouncing a proposal that would reflect the 2015 deal, arguing that "Iran, the world's leading state sponsor of terror...can't be trusted," and that, under such a framework, Iran would be "strengthened with an estimated one trillion dollars in sanctions relief over a decade".

In October 2023, following the outbreak of the Gaza war, Gottheimer led a group of lawmakers in demanding that Iran “be held fully accountable for its continued role in funding Hamas and Islamic terror,” and urging "the administration to take all necessary steps to cut off Iranian funding sources."

In February 2026, as President Trump amassed U.S. military forces around Iran, Gottheimer was the first Democrat to oppose an Iran war powers resolution introduced by Reps. Ro Khanna and Thomas Massie; Gottheimer and Republican Rep. Mike Lawler announced they opposed any resolution that would require congressional approval for a military strike against the country, saying it "would restrict the flexibility needed to respond to real and evolving threats and risks signaling weakness at a dangerous moment." On February 28, Gottheimer celebrated the U.S. and Israel having launched joint airstrikes against Iran, writing "the United States, with our key democratic ally Israel, took decisive action to defend our national security, fight terror, protect our allies, and stand with the Iranian people."

==== Israel ====
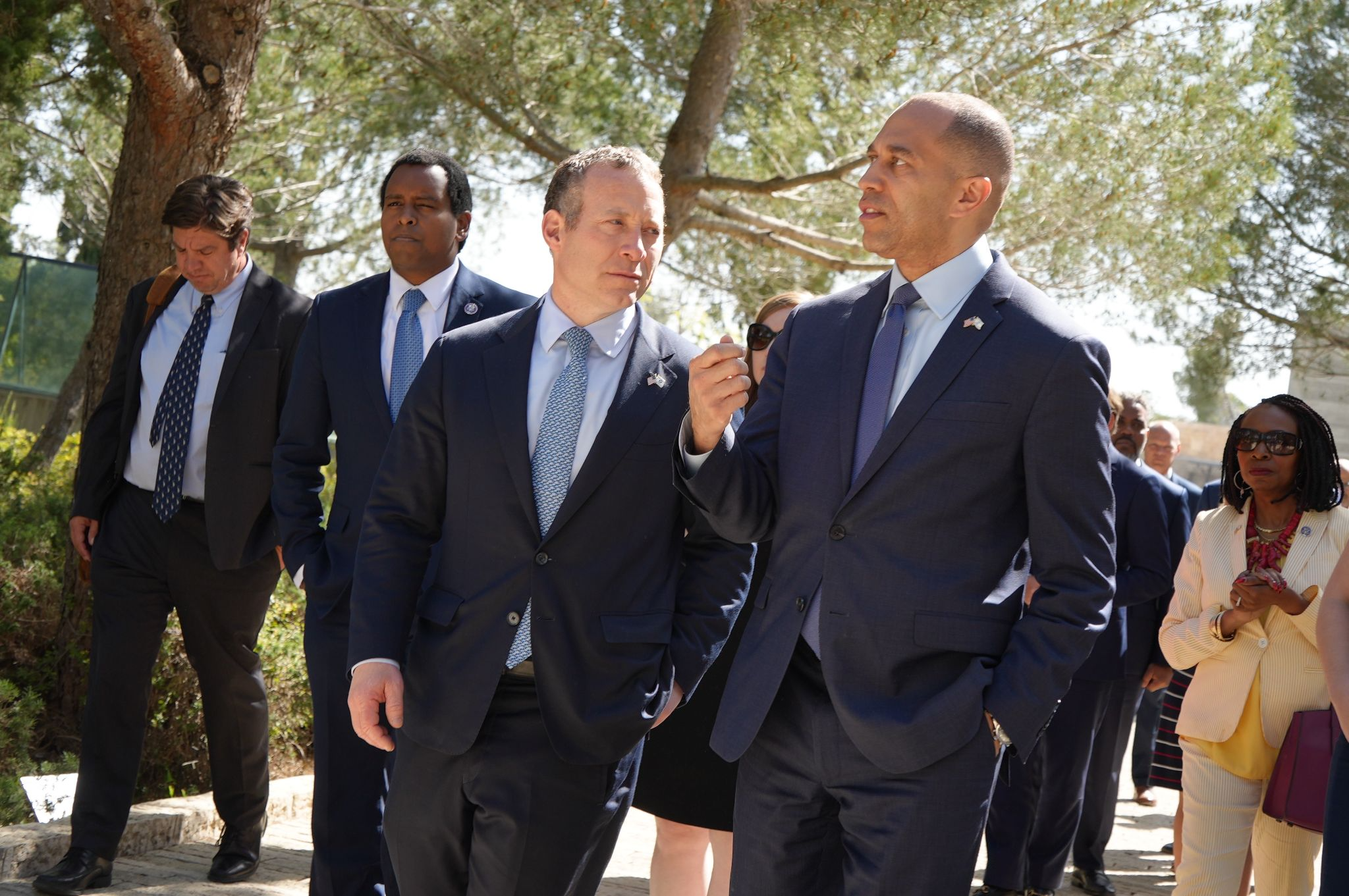
Rep. Josh Gottheimer alongside House Dem. Leader Hakeem Jeffries on an April 2023 congressional delegation to Israel

Gottheimer has said that, "Our relationship with Israel is a vital relationship" and "Israel [is] our most vital ally in the Middle East". Gottheimer has stated that the security of the United States and of Israel are so intertwined as to be inseparable. Gottheimer has opposed conditions on aid to Israel, stating, "I’ve worked personally against and successfully killed attempts to condition aid [to Israel]...I'll continue to work to kill conditions on aid [to the sole] democracy in the region and a critical ally".

In February 2017, Gottheimer stated that the United States embassy in Israel should be moved from Tel Aviv to Jerusalem, but that the move "should be left up to conversations between [Israeli and Palestinian] governments."

In March 2023, Gottheimer reaffirmed his pledge to "support Israel's security, grow the Abraham Accords, support a two-state solution and counter threats to Israel and the U.S." At the same time, Gottheimer urged members of Congress to refrain from voicing their concerns over proposed judicial reforms in Israel.

In April 2023, Gottheimer made two official trips to Israel within one week—once as a part of a 12-member delegation of House Democrats, including Minority Leader Hakeem Jeffries, and once as one of five Democrats to join Speaker Kevin McCarthy on a bipartisan visit. During the same month, Gottheimer co-sponsored legislation reaffirming the House's support for military aid to Israel.

In May 2023, Gottheimer and Rep. Mike Lawler introduced legislation expanding anti-boycott laws to include blocking boycotts organized by international governmental organizations, with the intended effect of stopping the Boycott, Divestment, and Sanctions movement in the United States. The legislation would prohibit American citizens and companies from supporting boycotts imposed by global entities (IGOs) against U.S. allies including Israel. The bill faced heavy criticism from House Republicans and conservatives who said it would violate Americans' First Amendment rights; House Republican leadership scrapped a vote on the bill in May 2025.

==== Gaza war (2023–present) ====
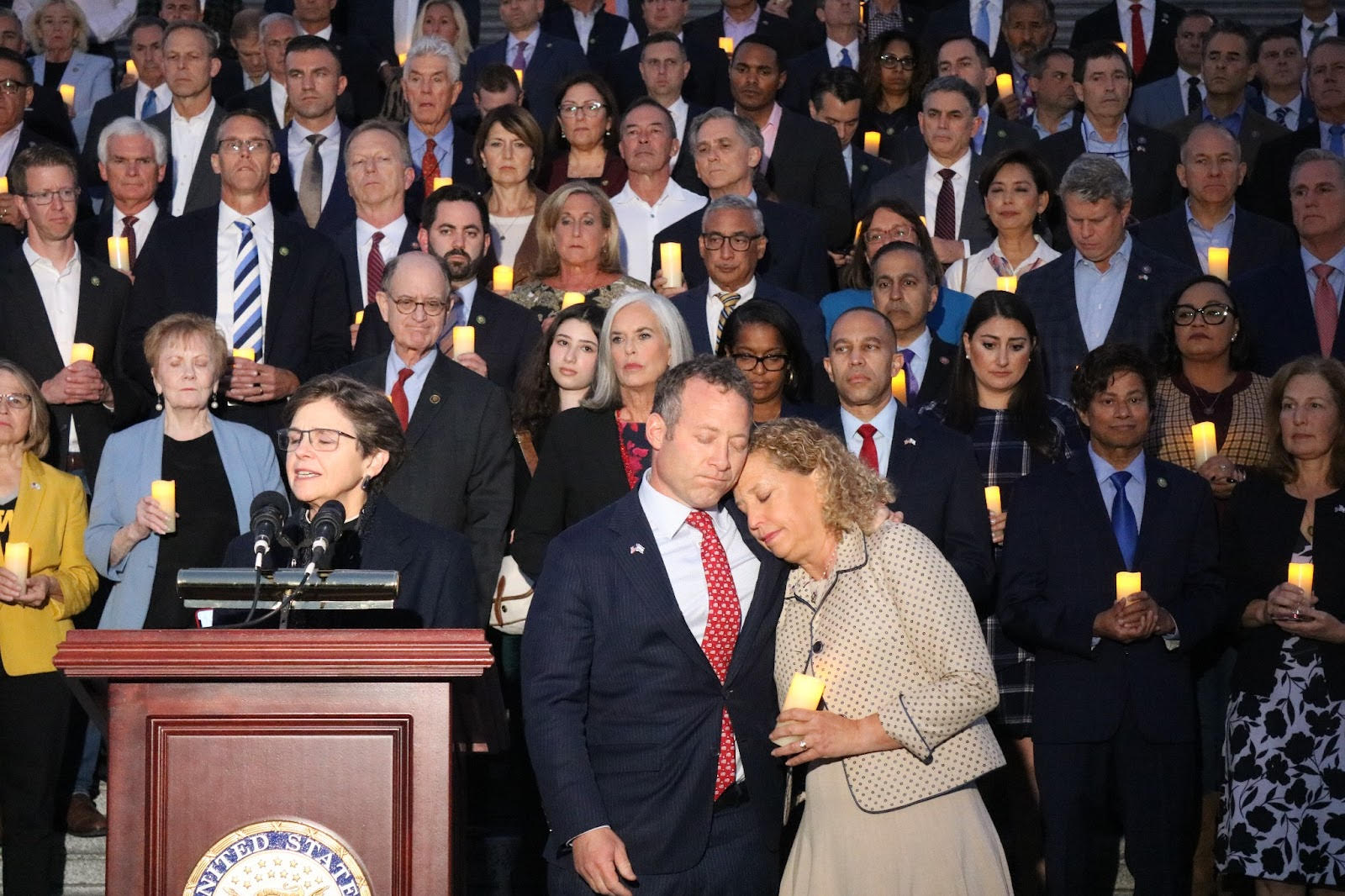
Gottheimer and Rep. Debbie Wasserman Schultz lead a vigil on the steps of the U.S. Capitol following the October 7 attack on Israel.

Following the October 7 attacks and the outbreak of the Gaza war, Gottheimer condemned Reps. Rashida Tlaib and Cori Bush's criticism of Israel, stating, "It sickens me that while Israelis clean the blood of their family members shot in their homes...[Bush and Tlaib] believe Congress should strip U.S. funding...and allow innocent civilians to suffer." On November 7, 2023, Gottheimer voted to censure Tlaib for "promoting false narratives regarding the October 7, 2023, Hamas attack" and her use of the slogan "from the river to the sea".

During a meeting with fellow House Democrats after October 7, Gottheimer interjected when Pennsylvania representative Susan Wild said that she didn't want any religious community to feel ostracized due to the massacre, specifically mentioning that Muslim clerics in her district hadn't attended a vigil for the victims. Gottheimer reportedly replied by either saying "because they're all guilty" or "because they should feel guilty." Greg Casar subsequently began arguing with Gottheimer, with Gottheimer saying not enough people had condemned Hamas. Casar replied by saying that Gottheimer didn't know whether Muslim leaders in Pennsylvania had failed to do so. Gottheimer subsequently denied that his comments regarding guilt were targeted towards Muslims.

On October 10, 2023, Gottheimer sponsored the "Operation Swords of Iron" Iron Dome Appropriations Act.

On October 16, 2023, Gottheimer (along with Reps. Don Bacon, Jared Moskowitz, and Claudia Tenney) led a group of 63 Democrats and 50 Republicans in drafting a letter to President Biden, in which they, "...ask[ed] him to boost Israel's security, hold Iran accountable for its role in funding Hamas...and put pressure on nations who support Hamas, including Qatar and Türkiye...[as well as] thanked the President for his unwavering support for the State of Israel [and] reaffirmed their commitment to increasing American security assistance".

On October 25, 2023, Gottheimer voted for a House resolution declaring solidarity with Israel and condemning Hamas. After the vote, Gottheimer criticized 15 colleagues including Rep. Andre Carson who voted in the minority, describing them as "despicable" and unrepresentative of the party; Carson responded by calling Gottheimer "cowardly" and "not acting in the role as a member of Congress". CNN described the Gottheimer–Carson scuttle as a microcosm of the broader divisions within the Democratic Party over Israel.

On November 2, 2023, Gottheimer was one of 12 House Democrats to vote for a $14.3 billion aid package to Israel that was funded by cutting the IRS' budget. Though Gottheimer disapproved of reducing funds for countering tax fraud, he viewed passing the aid and displaying support for Israel as paramount. On the same night, the House passed the Hamas International Financing Prevention Act (which Gottheimer cosponsored in January) that "would require the president to [report] on foreign entities that...assist Hamas or PIJ and...[to sanction] those entities, including [by] suspending U.S. assistance, seizing property...and denying exports".

On November 18, 2023, Gottheimer denounced Sen. Bernie Sanders' proposal that the U.S. condition military assistance to Israel on "a fundamental change in [Israel's] military and political positions," saying that, "Conditioning aid to Israel will...help Hamas in their goal of completely annihilating Israel and the Jewish people," therefore, "Any legislation that conditions security aid to our key democratic ally, Israel, is a nonstarter and will lose scores of votes."

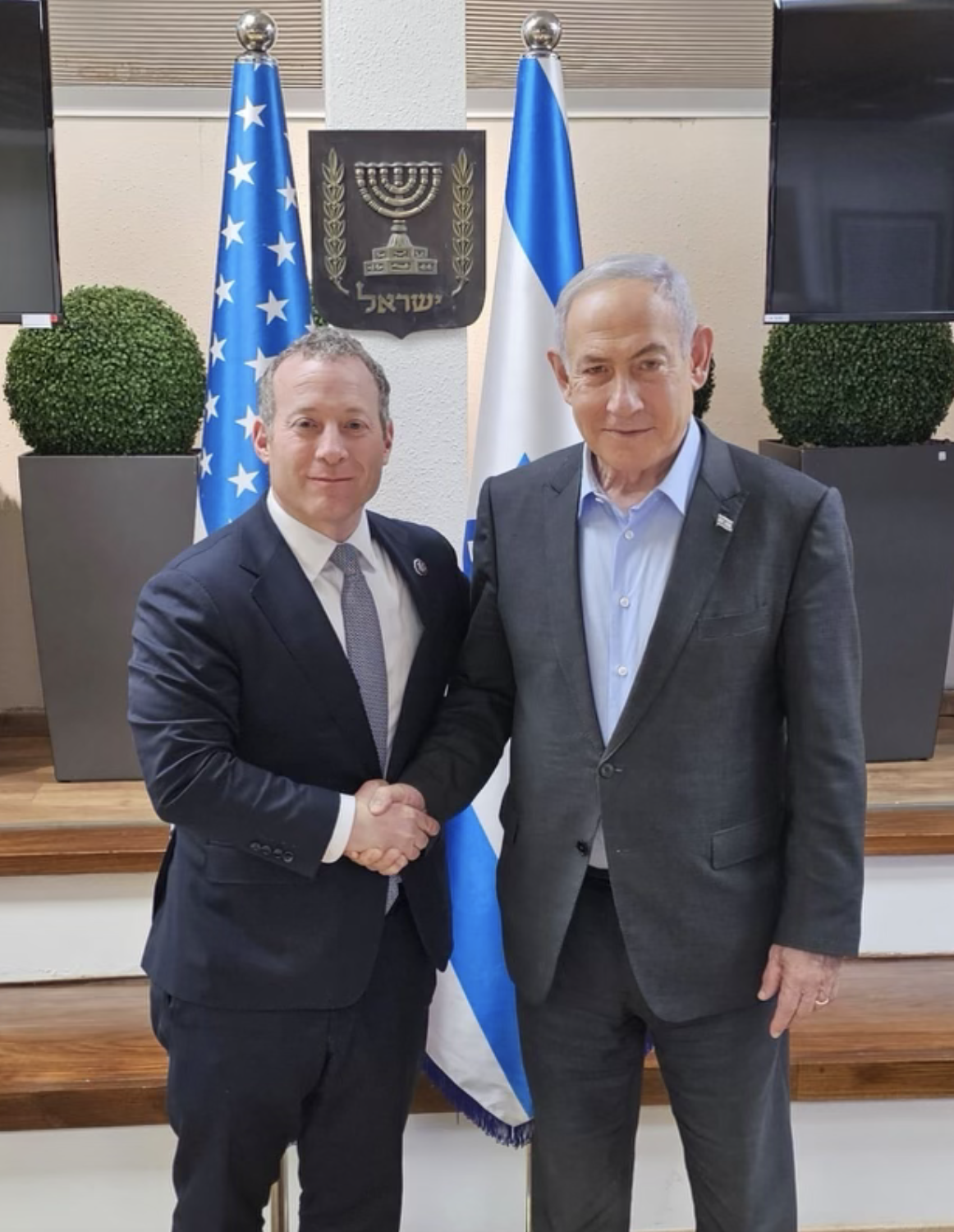
Gottheimer meets with PM Netanyahu on a House Intelligence Committee trip to Israel, Dec. 2023

In December 2023, Gottheimer led an official House Intelligence Committee trip to Israel, during which he and other congresspeople met with Prime Minister Benjamin Netanyahu, the director of Mossad, and other Israeli officials regarding the Gaza war. According to a statement by Gottheimer and his remarks at a virtual press conference, these meetings included discussions over Qatar's role as a negotiator, Houthi attacks on commercial vessels, sexual and gender-based violence in the October 7 attacks, the importance of avoiding civilian casualties, planning for Gaza's future after the war, and a deradicalization campaign in Palestine.

In January 2024, following Israel's claim that UNRWA officials contributed to Hamas' October 7 attack, the U.S. State Department suspended future 2024 payments to the agency. After the incident, Gottheimer argued that UNRWA is "flawed to the core" due to "systemic issues," saying the U.S. was justified in pulling funding because "it's time for UNRWA to disappear." Gottheimer went on to, in April 2024, rally congresspeople to include a ban on supporting UNWRA's Gaza efforts in legislation funding the State Department through 2025; the letter Gottheimer circulated amongst colleagues also proposed ending U.S. support for any international organization whose conduct constitutes antisemitism under a controversial definition crafted by the International Holocaust Remembrance Association. In May 2024, Gottheimer and Rep. Brian Mast introduced legislation aimed to recover the $121 million sent to UNWRA just prior to US funding being suspended.

On March 26, 2024, Gottheimer joined Sen. John Fetterman to denounce the Biden Administration's decision to, by abstaining, allow a U.N. Security Council resolution that, "demands an immediate ceasefire for the month of Ramadan respected by all parties leading to a permanent sustainable ceasefire, and also demands the immediate and unconditional release of all hostages," to pass. Gottheimer later expounded that he believed the resolution was indicative of how, "The international community has long unfairly scrutinized and ostracized Israel at the U.N.," before adding, "Israel has the right to defend herself from existential threats".

On April 5, 2024, Gottheimer returned from a trip to the Middle East where he met with Egyptian and Qatari officials who were negotiating the Gaza war. He reported being "hopeful that a temporary pause is within reach," urging Prime Minister Netanyahu to "empower" his negotiators to allow increased humanitarian aid to enter Gaza. He also decried news that Hamas had rejected certain "nonstarters" such as "full Israeli military withdrawal from Gaza, a permanent cease-fire, the return of displaced Palestinians to northern Gaza and...the release of an unspecified number of Palestinian prisoners held in Israeli jails."

On April 14, 2024, following Iran having launched airstrikes against Israel, Gottheimer and Rep. Joe Wilson led a bipartisan group of 89 House members in writing to Speaker Mike Johnson, urging him to immediately bring the Senate-passed Supplemental Aid package (which included military funds for Israel) to the floor for a vote. The group argued, "This weekend, the Iranian regime [having] launched hundreds of drones, cruise missiles, and ballistic missiles directly against our key, democratic ally in the Middle East, Israel," means that, "Time is of the essence, and we must ensure critical aid is delivered to Israel and our other democratic allies facing threats from our adversaries around the world."

On May 10, 2024, Gottheimer led a group of 26 House Democrats in writing to National Security Advisor Jake Sullivan to criticize the Biden administration having "paused transfers of ammunition and 500-pound and 2000-pound bombs" in opposition to Israel's invasion of Rafah. Later, on May 16, Gottheimer was one of 16 House Democrats to join Republicans in passing the Israel Security Assistance Support Act, which would compel the Biden administration to reverse the pause by partially defunding the State Department, Defense Department, and Executive Office of the President unless the cancelled weapons shipments were resumed.

On May 30, 2024, Gottheimer led a group of 19 House Democrats in writing to Secretary of State Antony Blinken and Treasury Secretary Janet Yellen in support of sanctioning ICC officials, specifically mentioning Chief Prosecutor Karim Khan. The letter was in response to the Biden administration declining to impose sanctions against the ICC after it applied for arrest warrants against Israeli leaders for war crimes. The letter argued for sanctions due to signatories' belief that, "The charges against Israeli leaders are baseless [and] reflect the ICC's well-documented historical bias against Israel."

In June 2024, Gottheimer spoke out against the Maldives having announced plans to ban Israeli passport holders from entering the country—the nation's response to Israel's role in the ongoing Gaza conflict. Gottheimer called the ban "a blatant act of Jew hatred" and said "They shouldn't get a cent of American dollars until they reverse course," prompting him to develop legislation called the Protecting Allied Travel Here (PATH) Act that would condition U.S. aid to the Maldives on allowing Israeli passport holders into the country.

On July 3, 2024, Gottheimer met with Benjamin Netanyahu, IDF Chief of Staff Herzi Halevi, and Tzachi Hanegbi, the director of Israel's national security council, at the Israeli prime minister's office in Jerusalem. After the meeting, Netanyahu thanked Gottheimer "for his consistent support of Israel, as well as for the American support for Israel since the start of the war."

In June 2024, Gottheimer, Rep. Jared Moskowitz, and three Republicans introduced an amendment to the State Department's funding bill barring the Biden administration from citing Gaza Health Ministry death tolls. The House passed it 269–144, with support from 62 Democrats and all but two Republicans. The Gaza Health Ministry, long cited by U.S., Israeli officials, and media, is the only official source for death data in Gaza.

==== Syria ====
Gottheimer said that he thought President Donald Trump acted appropriately in striking Syria in response to the 2018 use of chemical weapons by the Syrian government. "There's room the president has to deal with a crisis, and I believed, if you looked at the heinous crimes and atrocities committed, poisoning your own children, that demanded a response, and I'm glad he responded."

==== Ukraine ====
Gottheimer and Rep. Brian Fitzpatrick introduced House legislation to support Sen. Joe Manchin's initiative to close American ports to Russian oil, natural gas, and coal products.

In October 2023, Gottheimer backed Sen. Lindsey Graham's bill to simultaneously fund Ukraine military assistance (which had, after debate, previously been excluded from the September 2023 continuing resolution to fund the US government) and increased domestic border security. When speaking on the bill, Gottheimer claimed it was necessary to "support Ukraine to make sure we stand up to Putin and to China and Iran, which is critical to our national security and to our allies". Lawmakers were not able to pass Graham's package (or any other Ukraine/border funding bill) before Congress ended its session in December 2023.

In February 2024, Rep. Brian Fitzpatrick introduced the Defending Borders, Defending Democracies Act, which had three Republican and three Democratic co-sponsors from the Problem Solvers Caucus. The bill included $47.7 billion in aid to Ukraine, $10.4 billion for Israel, and $4.9 billion for allies in the Indo-Pacific in an effort to combat China. Gottheimer, at first, did not support Fitzpatrick's bill, but later co-sponsored it after introducing a humanitarian aid package.

==== Venezuela ====
In January 2026, after President Trump ordered the U.S. military to capture Venezuelan President Nicolás Maduro, Gottheimer commended the operation and said that Maduro "undermined democracy" and "enabled the flow of drugs to America."

=== Electoral politics ===
In June 2021, Gottheimer joined Reps. Hakeem Jeffries and Terri Sewell to launch the Team Blue PAC, which aimed to defend incumbent Democrats against primary challenges. In February 2022, Team Blue's first slate of endorsements backed moderate incumbents against progressive challengers. Left-wing groups like Justice Democrats claimed the PAC's intentions were to quash progressivism in "deep-blue" districts, while Gottheimer said, "We want to support common-sense members who are delivering for their districts."

In September 2023, Gottheimer defended New Jersey's county line system, under which candidates supported by county-level party organizations had their names advantageously placed on primary ballots in that county. Gottheimer said, "It gives rank and file Democrats at the local level a strong voice in selecting their best candidates." In June 2024, after a judge ordered that the Democratic Party could not use county line ballots for New Jersey's 2024 primaries (and as the system faced further judication), Gottheimer conceded, "I'm going to respect where it comes out in the courts."

In June 2024, Gottheimer was the first Democratic congressperson to endorse incumbent Rep. Jamaal Bowman's opponent, George Latimer, in the hotly-contested Democratic primary that was defined in large part by Bowman's criticism of Israel during the Gaza war.

==== 2024 presidential election ====
On July 9, 2024, after Joe Biden's widely criticized debate performance in late June, Gottheimer said "it's up to [Biden] what he wants to do." On July 21, Biden announced his departure from the race, prompting Gottheimer to say "it's time to move forward, united in our shared goals." The next day, Gottheimer followed a wave of Democrats in supporting Vice President Kamala Harris, whom Biden had endorsed, to be the Democratic nominee.

==== Bipartisanship ====
Gottheimer was ranked the eighth most bipartisan member of the House for 2017 by the Bipartisan Index, a metric published by The Lugar Center and Georgetown's McCourt School of Public Policy. For 2020, 2021, and 2022, Gottheimer was ranked the most bipartisan Democrat in the House — placing second overall behind Rep. Brian Fitzpatrick for 2022.

Gottheimer is the Democratic co-chair of the bipartisan Problem Solvers Caucus. Gottheimer has pointed to his work with the Problem Solvers Caucus as proof that he is not "ideologically rigid." He has also said that members of Congress "are more bipartisan than people think." In October 2023, reports noted fractures emerging amongst the Problem Solvers: Republican caucus leadership made a bipartisan appeal urging members to vote to retain Kevin McCarthy as Speaker, but every Democrat ultimately voted to remove him; Gottheimer called the incident "an emotional day" for the caucus. Furthermore, in March 2024, Politico reported that some members of the caucus questioned Gottheimer's bipartisan credentials, writing, "one data point is particularly irksome to Republicans in the group: Fitzpatrick [the Republican co-chair], a purple-district lawmaker, has bucked his party far more often this Congress than Gottheimer, who now represents a safe seat."

Since being elected, Gottheimer has worked with the No Labels organization, with founder Nancy Jacobson saying, "we put Congressman Gottheimer in there"; though the caucus was announced in 2014, it was launched in 2017 with Gottheimer, upon just having taken office, becoming its first (and thus far only) Democratic co-chair. In September 2023, Gottheimer co-headlined a No-Labels-organized event despite having, recently before, denounced the group's intentions of putting up a third-party presidential candidate in 2024. According to The Intercept, "Wealthy executives and investors have funneled hundreds of thousands through No Labels's Problem Solvers PAC to members of the caucus," including Gottheimer.

In February 2024, "hardline" House Republicans floated removing Speaker Mike Johnson after he agreed to a spending deal with Senate Democrats; Gottheimer, meanwhile, aimed to give Johnson "room to put bipartisan legislation on the floor" by authoring a resolution that, "...would require party leadership or a majority of either party's caucus to sanction any vote to vacate the speaker's chair," (as opposed to the contemporaneous rule that any single member could force a vote on removal) and which was contingent on Johnson holding a vote on a defense spending package including aid to Israel and Ukraine.

=== Other politicians ===
==== Bob Menendez ====
Gottheimer, after the senator endorsed him in the 2020 Democratic primary, proclaimed that, "New Jersey is incredibly fortunate to have Bob Menendez in the Senate...He's a real champion for our families and I'm honored and grateful to have his support.”

In September 2023 (the day after the senator was charged with taking bribes and providing sensitive information to the Egyptian government), Gottheimer called on Menendez to resign, writing, "For the good of the state, he should step aside as he focuses on his defense”.

Following Menendez's 2023 indictment, there was some speculation Gottheimer might run for the Senate seat. However, in November, Gottheimer endorsed Tammy Murphy in the 2024 Democratic primary for the seat. When Murphy dropped out of the race in March 2024, Gottheimer switched to endorse Rep. Andy Kim.

==== Donald Trump ====
In 2017, Gottheimer called for an independent commission to probe alleged ties between Donald Trump and Russia.

On the possibility of impeaching Trump over the Ukraine scandal, in September 2019 Gottheimer said, "We need to make sure this is fact-driven and evidence-based. You can't prejudge something that is so solemn and obviously could have a big historical impact on our country, and you need to keep the country together."

Gottheimer voted to impeach Trump during both his first impeachment and his second impeachment.

Gottheimer was one of eight Democrats to vote against a resolution that would curtail Trump's war powers following the assassination of Iranian general Qasem Soleimani in January 2020.

When asked during a 2020 primary election forum in what ways he supported Trump, Gottheimer answered that, "He's good on the relationship with U.S.-Israel. Although I don't agree with everything that...Netanyahu does or says, I think it's a very important relationship to the United States".

==== Markwayne Mullin ====
Gottheimer and Republican Markwayne Mullin, a former House member and US senator who was DHS secretary during Trump's second term, met at the gym when they served together in the lower chamber, becoming friendly and developing what several publications called a "bromance." When Mullin was a senator in 2024, he and Gottheimer worked closely to push a package for military aid to Ukraine; throughout 2026, after Mullin became DHS secretary, they were in communication regarding migrant detention facilities; and in June 2026, their daughters, rising high school seniors Ellie Gottheimer and Larra Mullin, co-wrote a children's picture book that showcased "the power of bipartisan cooperation."

=== Antisemitism ===
Gottheimer has confronted fellow Democratic representatives over their comments and stances that he has considered antisemitic: In March 2019, Gottheimer was involved in drafting a House resolution to condemn the "myth of dual loyalty" after Ilhan Omar had accused certain supporters of Israel of having "allegiance to a foreign country"; in February 2023, Gottheimer "convinced" Omar to sign a resolution (which he authored) that condemned antisemitism before she was removed from the Foreign Affairs Committee due to her past comments pertaining to Israel; and in July 2023, Gottheimer co-wrote a statement denouncing as "unacceptable" Pramila Jayapal having remarked that Israel is a "racist state".

In January 2020, Gottheimer spoke out against a "massive wave of anti-Semitism on college campuses" as well as touted his efforts to fund the Nonprofit Security Grant Program and secure related grants for New Jersey religious institutions. In May 2024, Gottheimer announced he had helped secure $4.8 million in federal grants to "invest in physical protections, training and security technology" for 34 "synagogues, mosques, churches, religious schools and community centers" across his district.

In September 2023, Gottheimer called on the University of Pennsylvania to disinvite Roger Waters and Marc Lamont Hill as speakers at the school's Palestine Writes Literature Festival. Due to accusations of antisemitism and Waters' criticisms of Israel, Gottheimer claimed the musician would be given, "a bully pulpit" and that, "antisemitism and anti-Israel advocates [would be] given a platform to spew hate". In the same letter, Gottheimer asked for Princeton University to reconsider its use of Jasbir Puar's text The Right to Maim in classes on decolonial studies, calling the text "offensive, antisemitic blood libel [...] containing antisemitic tropes and anti-Israel sentiment". Both universities responded by denying Gottheimer's requests and citing academic freedom: Christopher L. Eisgruber, Princeton's president, stated, "all students can thrive here, but not by censoring our curriculum," while M. Elizabeth Magill, Penn's president, said, "[we] fiercely support [...] the expression of views that are controversial and even those that are incompatible with our institutional values".

On December 4, 2023, Gottheimer wrote to the president of Rutgers University, asking that the school cancel a seminar with Noura Erakat, Nick Estes, and Marc Lamont Hill, advertised as being about the interrelation of the Gaza war with settler colonialism and anti-Blackness, due to the congressman's belief that Estes and Lamont Hill were "well-known antisemites" and the seminar would "promote hate speech and exacerbate the potential for violence and attacks toward Rutgers’ Jewish students". Rutgers declined to cancel the event citing academic freedom. Media connected Gottheimer's back-and-forth with Rutgers to the broader developments on college campuses following the October 7 attacks.

After the presidents of Harvard, University of Pennsylvania, and Massachusetts Institute of Technology were interrogated at the December 5 2023 United States Congress hearing on antisemitism, Gottheimer called for the aforementioned university presidents to resign over the statements they made, saying that "when directly asked [...] if calling for genocide of Jews violated their school's code of conduct [...the presidents] couldn't deliver a simple yes or no answer". Also in December 2023, Gottheimer was one of 95 Democrats to vote for a resolution that "clearly and firmly states that anti-Zionism is antisemitism."

In January 2024, Gottheimer condemned the Teaneck school district for partnering with a local chapter of the Council on American-Islamic Relations (who it enlisted alongside the Anti-Defamation League and Facing History & Ourselves) as part of its "Togetherness and Belonging" program. Gottheimer called it "outrageous and unacceptable", taking umbrage at previous remarks by CAIR's national director Nihad Awad about the Gaza war. A spokesperson for CAIR-NJ responded that "We have consistently made clear that our critique is of Israel as a nation state and not of Jews". In February 2024, Teaneck High School students organized a march and protest to support a ceasefire in Gaza, which Gottheimer condemned as, "...an antisemitic, anti-Israel protest during school hours."

In February 2024, a sticker with the design of the Palestinian flag reading that read "Boycott Israeli Apartheid" was found affixed to a poster featuring a since-freed hostage from Hamas' October 7 attack on Israel, which was displayed outside Gottheimer's Capitol Hill office. Gottheimer described the incident as, "nothing less than a blatant act of antisemitism and hate," and said, "I refuse to be silent in the face of this horrific behavior, which only serves to perpetuate and amplify the skyrocketing levels of antisemitism across our nation." In March 2024, Gottheimer reported a second, similar instance concerning a poster outside his office; he called the incident "truly deprived and heinous."

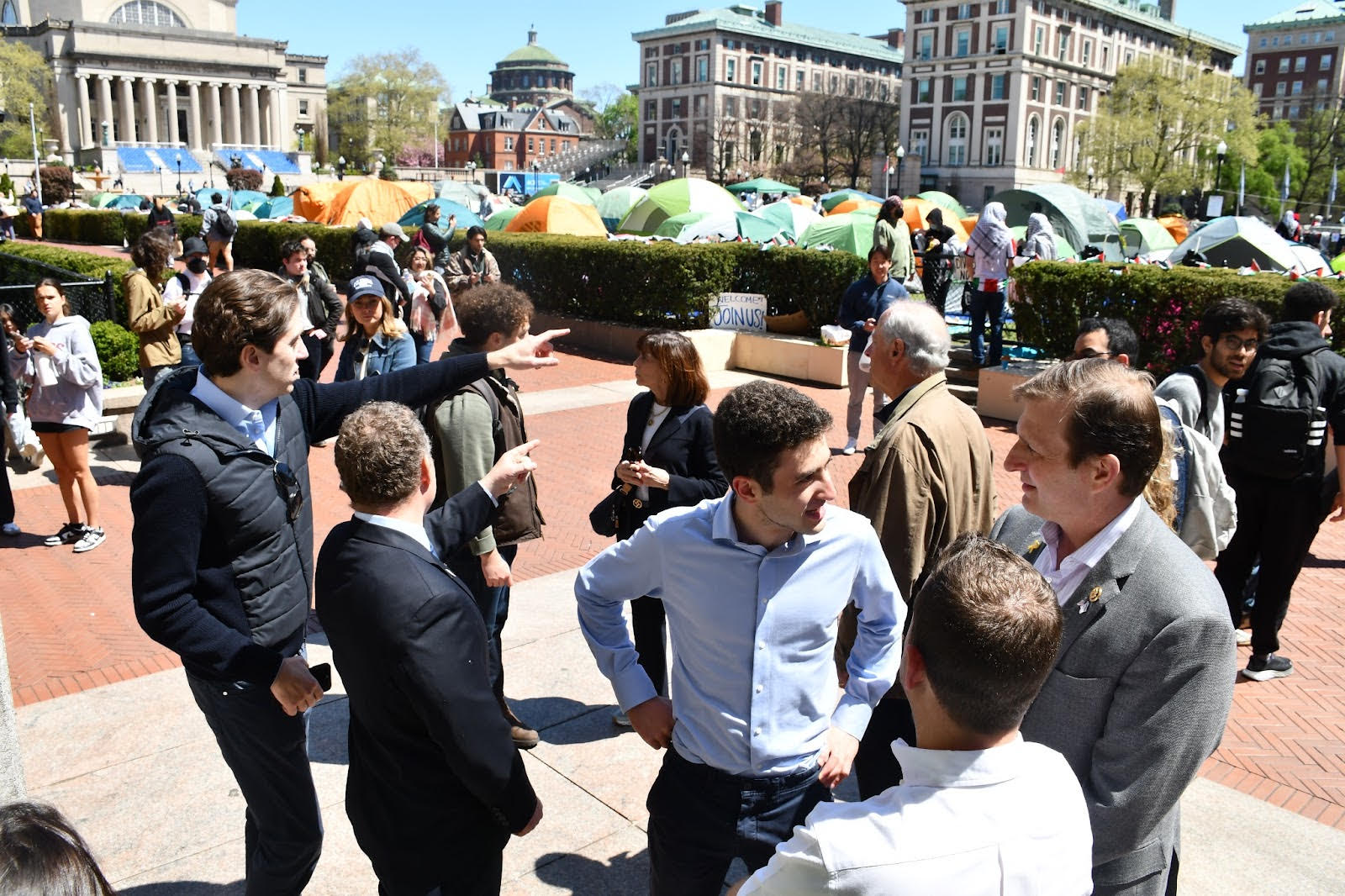
US Reps. tour Columbia University in light of Pro-Palestine encampments.

In April 2024, Gottheimer and fellow Jewish lawmakers Reps. Dan Goldman, Jared Moskowitz, and Kathy Manning visited Columbia University and held a press conference at the school's Center for Jewish Life. The visit came on the sixth day of heightened pro-Palestinian student protests at Columbia, following, the week before, Columbia's president and other administrators having testified before congress regarding increased antisemitism on campus. At the press conference, the lawmakers condemned the demonstrations as antisemitic and dangerous, with Gottheimer reaffirming that "We will do everything in our power to keep you safe and do everything in Washington [D.C.] we can to make sure that you feel welcome at this university", before warning that, "Columbia University, if they don't follow through, will pay the price." Later that month, Gottheimer and Rep. Dan Goldman led a group of 21 House Democrats in writing to Columbia's board of trustees, expressing disappointment that Columbia University had not yet disbanded the encampment, exhorting unwilling trustees to resign, and arguing that the encampments constituted "an apparent violation of Title VI of the Civil Rights Act." In May 2024, following similar encampments at Rutgers University having disbanded upon the administration conceding to eight of the protester's ten demands, Gottheimer and Rep. Donald Norcross sent a letter to Rutgers president Jonathan Holloway, claiming Rutgers "appeased the demands of violent and hateful agitators".

In May 2024, the Antisemitism Awareness Act, which Gottheimer co-authored, passed 320-91 in the House. The bill, in response to pro-Palestine protests at American universities, would stipulate that the Education Department use the International Holocaust Remembrance Alliance's definition of antisemitism when applying federal anti-discrimination laws, such as during Title VI proceedings: the bill would lower the threshold for student civil rights complaints alleging antisemitism and threaten with civil rights enforcement universities that do not protect students according to the new standards. Speaking on the House floor before the vote, Gottheimer linked the bill to protests at Columbia University and claimed, "This bill is a critical step we can take to stand against hate." The next day, responding to criticisms that the bill would infringe upon free speech rights, Gottheimer said: "You should, of course, protect free speech in this great country...[but] harassing and intimidating and discrimination...[and] Hate shouldn't be allowed on our college campuses."

== Electoral history ==
2016 Democratic primary results
Party	Candidate	Votes	%
Democratic	Joshua S. Gottheimer	43,250	100.0
Total votes		43,250	100.0

New Jersey's 5th congressional district, 2016
Party	Candidate	Votes	%
Democratic	Josh Gottheimer	172,587	51.1
Republican	Scott Garrett (incumbent)	157,690	46.7
Libertarian	Claudio Belusic	7,424	2.2
Total votes		337,701	100.0
Democratic gain from Republican			

New Jersey's 5th congressional district, 2018
Party	Candidate	Votes	%
Democratic	Josh Gottheimer (incumbent)	169,546	56.2
Republican	John J. McCann	128,255	42.5
Libertarian	James Tosone	2,115	0.7
Independent	Wendy Goetz	1,907	0.6
Total votes		301,823	100.0
Democratic hold			

2020 Democratic primary results
Party	Candidate	Votes	%
Democratic	Josh Gottheimer (incumbent)	52,406	66.5
Democratic	Arati Kreibich	26,418	33.5

New Jersey's 5th congressional district, 2020
Party	Candidate	Votes	%
Democratic	Josh Gottheimer (incumbent)	225,175	53.2
Republican	Frank Pallotta	193,333	45.6
Independent	Louis Vellucci	5,128	1.2

New Jersey's 5th congressional district election, 2022
Party	Candidate	Votes	%
Democratic	Josh Gottheimer (incumbent)	145,559	54.7
Republican	Frank Pallotta	117,873	44.3
Libertarian	Jeremy Marcus	1,193	0.5
Independent	Trevor Ferrigno	700	0.3
Independent	Louis Vellucci	618	0.2
Total votes		265,943	100.0
Democratic hold			

New Jersey's 5th congressional district election, 2024
Party	Candidate	Votes	%
Democratic	Josh Gottheimer (incumbent)	208,359	54.6
Republican	Mary Jo-Ann Guinchard	165,287	43.3
Green	Beau Forte	3,428	0.9
Libertarian	James Tosone	2,540	0.6
Independent	Amir Aarif	2,375	0.6
Total votes		381,889	100.0
Democratic hold			

== Books ==
Gottheimer is the editor of Ripples of Hope (2003), a collection of American civil-rights speeches. The text of one of the speeches included in the book, which was delivered by Martin Luther King Jr. in Selma on January 25, 1965, was previously unpublished. Gottheimer acquired the text from an Alabama police consultant who had transcribed it from FBI surveillance tapes.

Despite not working on any of the Obama campaigns, Gottheimer also co-authored Power of Words (2011) with Mary Frances Berry, a book about Barack Obama's speeches. Power of Words sold poorly, with less than 1,000 copies purchased across all formats, and was upsetting to former Obama campaign staffers, given Gottheimer's position and actions in the 2008 Clinton campaign.

== Personal life ==
Gottheimer is a native of North Caldwell. He moved to Wyckoff prior to his first run for Congress in 2016, then moved to Tenafly, where he currently resides, before announcing his bid for governor in 2024. He is Jewish and a member of the Alpha Epsilon Pi fraternity. He married Marla Tusk in 2006. They have two children.

== Bibliography ==
- Gottheimer, Josh, ed. (2003). Ripples of Hope: Great American Civil Rights Speeches. New York: Basic Civitas Books. p. 463. ISBN 0-465-02752-0.
- Berry, Mary Frances (2011). Gottheimer, Josh (ed.). Power in Words: The Stories behind Barack Obama's Speeches, from the State House to the White House. Beacon Press. ISBN 978-0-807-00169-1.

== See also ==
- List of Harvard University politicians
- List of Jewish members of the United States Congress

U.S. House of Representatives
Preceded by Scott Garrett	Member of the U.S. House of Representatives from New Jersey's 5th congressional district 2017–present	Incumbent
Party political offices
Preceded by Kurt Schrader	Democratic Co-Chair of the Problem Solvers Caucus; 2017–2025; Served alongside: Tom Reed, Brian Fitzpatrick	Succeeded by Tom Suozzi
U.S. order of precedence (ceremonial)
Preceded by Vicente Gonzalez	United States representatives by seniority 166th	Succeeded by Clay Higgins
