= New York's congressional districts =

U.S. House districts in the state of New York

A map of New York's congressional districts in use from the 2024 elections Interactive map version

The U.S. state of New York contains 26 congressional districts. Each district elects one member of the United States House of Representatives to represent it.

The state was redistricted in 2022, following the 2020 U.S. census. It lost one seat in Congress. According to CNN, unnamed census officials stated that if 89 more people had been counted in New York's census results, and all other states' population figures had remained the same, New York would not have lost a congressional seat.

== Current districts and representatives ==
The list below shows the members of the United States House delegation from New York, along with district boundaries and district CPVI ratings. As of February 2025, New York is represented by 26 members of Congress, including nineteen Democrats and seven Republicans.

Current U.S. representatives from New York
Region	District	Member (Residence)	Party	Incumbent since	CPVI (2025)	District map
Suburban Long Island	1st	Nick LaLota (Amityville)	Republican	January 3, 2023	R+4	
Suburban Long Island	2nd	Andrew Garbarino (Bayport)	Republican	January 3, 2021	R+6	
Suburban Long Island	3rd	Tom Suozzi (Glen Cove)	Democratic	February 13, 2024	EVEN	
Suburban Long Island	4th	Laura Gillen (Rockville Centre)	Democratic	January 3, 2025	D+2	
New York City	5th	Gregory Meeks (Queens)	Democratic	February 3, 1998	D+24	
New York City	6th	Grace Meng (Queens)	Democratic	January 3, 2013	D+6	
New York City	7th	Nydia Velázquez (Brooklyn)	Democratic	January 3, 1993	D+25	
New York City	8th	Hakeem Jeffries (Brooklyn)	Democratic	January 3, 2013	D+24	
New York City	9th	Yvette Clarke (Brooklyn)	Democratic	January 3, 2007	D+22	
New York City	10th	Dan Goldman (Manhattan)	Democratic	January 3, 2023	D+32	
New York City	11th	Nicole Malliotakis (Staten Island)	Republican	January 3, 2021	R+10	
New York City	12th	Jerry Nadler (Manhattan)	Democratic	November 3, 1992	D+33	
New York City	13th	Adriano Espaillat (Manhattan)	Democratic	January 3, 2017	D+32	
New York City	14th	Alexandria Ocasio-Cortez (Queens)	Democratic	January 3, 2019	D+19	
New York City	15th	Ritchie Torres (The Bronx)	Democratic	January 3, 2021	D+27	
North of NYC	16th	George Latimer (Rye)	Democratic	January 3, 2025	D+18	
North of NYC	17th	Mike Lawler (Pearl River)	Republican	January 3, 2023	D+1	
North of NYC	18th	Pat Ryan (Gardiner)	Democratic	September 13, 2022	D+2	
North of NYC	19th	Josh Riley (Ithaca)	Democratic	January 3, 2025	D+1	
North of NYC	20th	Paul Tonko (Amsterdam)	Democratic	January 3, 2009	D+8	
North of NYC	21st	Elise Stefanik (Schuylerville)	Republican	January 3, 2015	R+10	
North of NYC	22nd	John Mannion (Geddes)	Democratic	January 3, 2025	D+4	
North of NYC	23rd	Nick Langworthy (Pendleton)	Republican	January 3, 2023	R+10	
North of NYC	24th	Claudia Tenney (Cleveland)	Republican	February 11, 2021	R+11	
North of NYC	25th	Joseph Morelle (Irondequoit)	Democratic	November 13, 2018	D+10	
North of NYC	26th	Tim Kennedy (Buffalo)	Democratic	April 30, 2024	D+11	

== 2024 redistricting ==
Following the New York Court of Appeals' December 2023 decision in Hoffman v New York State Ind. Redistricting. Commn., the New York State Legislature drew new congressional district maps to be used beginning in the 2024 elections.

== Obsolete districts ==
- New York's 27th congressional district, obsolete since the 2020 U.S. census
- New York's 28th congressional district, obsolete since the 2010 U.S. census
- New York's 29th congressional district, obsolete since the 2010 U.S. census
- New York's 30th congressional district, obsolete since the 2000 U.S. census
- New York's 31st congressional district, obsolete since the 2000 U.S. census
- New York's 32nd congressional district, obsolete since the 1990 U.S. census
- New York's 33rd congressional district, obsolete since the 1990 U.S. census
- New York's 34th congressional district, obsolete since the 1990 U.S. census
- New York's 35th congressional district, obsolete since the 1980 U.S. census
- New York's 36th congressional district, obsolete since the 1980 U.S. census
- New York's 37th congressional district, obsolete since the 1980 U.S. census
- New York's 38th congressional district, obsolete since the 1980 U.S. census
- New York's 39th congressional district, obsolete since the 1980 U.S. census
- New York's 40th congressional district, obsolete since the 1970 U.S. census
- New York's 41st congressional district, obsolete since the 1970 U.S. census
- New York's 42nd congressional district, obsolete since the 1960 U.S. census
- New York's 43rd congressional district, obsolete since the 1960 U.S. census
- New York's 44th congressional district, obsolete since the 1950 U.S. census
- New York's 45th congressional district, obsolete since the 1950 U.S. census

== Historical district maps ==
Maps of New York State's congressional districts
2003 to 2013

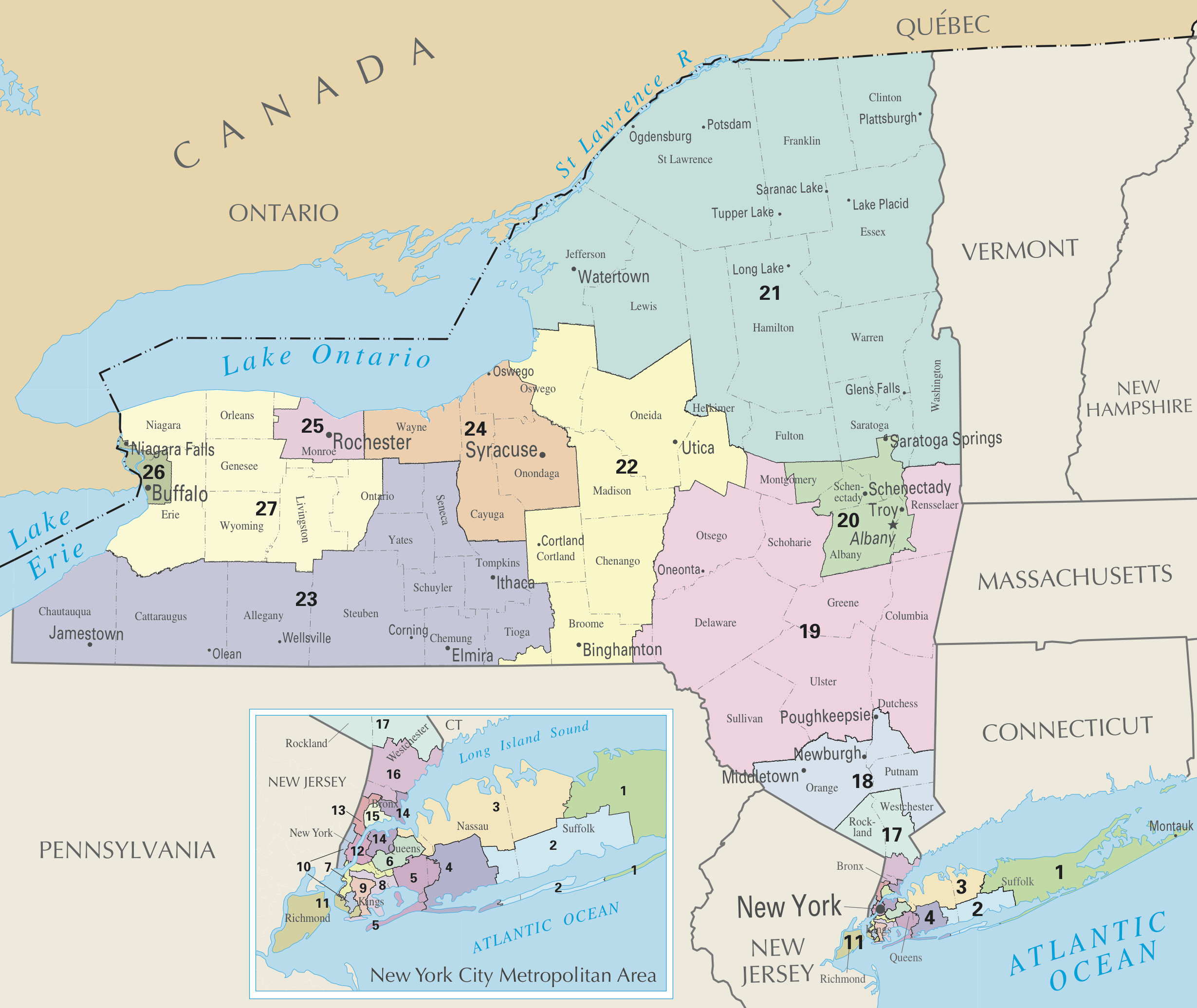
2013 to 2023.

2023 to 2025

== See also ==
- Elections in New York
- List of United States congressional districts
- List of United States representatives from New York
- New York's at-large congressional seat
- New York's congressional delegations
