= Conservative coalition =

Circa 1939-1963 congressional cross-party coalition in the United States

The conservative coalition, founded in 1937, was an unofficial alliance of members of the United States Congress which brought together the conservative wings of the Republican and Democratic parties to oppose President Franklin Delano Roosevelt's New Deal. In addition to Roosevelt, the conservative coalition dominated Congress for four presidencies, blocking legislation proposed by Roosevelt and his successors. By 1937, the conservatives were the largest faction in the Republican Party which had opposed the New Deal in some form since 1933. Despite Roosevelt being a Democrat himself, his party did not universally support the New Deal agenda in Congress. Democrats who opposed Roosevelt's policies tended to hold conservative views, and allied with conservative Republicans. These Democrats were mostly located in the South. According to James T. Patterson: "By and large the congressional conservatives agreed in opposing the spread of federal power and bureaucracy, in denouncing deficit spending, in criticizing industrial labor unions, and in excoriating most welfare programs. They sought to 'conserve' an America which they believed to have existed before 1933."

The coalition dominated Congress from 1939 to 1963, when former Senate Majority Leader Lyndon Johnson assumed the presidency and broke its influence. Johnson took advantage of weakened conservative opposition, and Congress passed many progressive economic and social reforms in his presidency. The conservative coalition, which controlled key congressional committees and made up a majority of both houses of Congress during the Presidency of John F. Kennedy, had prevented the implementation of progressive reforms since the late 1930s. It remained a declining political force until it disappeared in the mid-1990s when few conservative Democrats remained in Congress.

Never a formalized alliance, the conservative coalition most often appeared on votes affecting labor unions based on Congressional roll call votes. Congressional opponents of civil rights reform—consisting of white Southern Democrats and Republicans, despite being an overall minority in both chambers—prevented major congressional action on civil rights during the relevant time period through control of influential committees and by exploiting the Senate filibuster rule. The conservative coalition opposition weakened on civil rights bills, ultimately enabling President Johnson and Everett Dirksen to convince sufficient numbers of Senate Republicans to ally with liberal Democrats to invoke cloture and push through the Civil Rights Act of 1964. None the less, often, the coalition had the power to prevent unwanted bills from even coming to a vote. As chairmanship of committees in Congress was largely dictated by seniority, the coalition included many committee chairmen from the South who had served for many years and who blocked bills by simply not reporting them from their committees. Furthermore, Howard W. Smith, chairman of the House Rules Committee, often could kill a bill simply by not reporting it out with a favorable rule; he lost some of that power in 1961. The conservative coalition was not unified with regard to foreign policy, as most Southern Democrats were internationalists. Most Republicans supported isolationism until President Dwight D. Eisenhower took office in 1953.

== History ==
=== Origins ===
In 1936, President Franklin D. Roosevelt was re-elected in a landslide; Alf Landon, his Republican opponent, could only win two states. In the 1937–1939 session of Congress, the Republicans would have only 17 senators (out of a total of 96) and 89 congressmen (out of a total of 435). Given his party's overwhelming majorities, FDR decided he could overcome opposition to his liberal New Deal policies by the conservative justices of the Supreme Court, which had struck down many New Deal agencies as unconstitutional. Roosevelt proposed to expand the size of the court from nine to fifteen justices; if the proposal met with success, he would be able to "pack" the court with six new justices who would support his policies.

However, the Southern Democrats, who controlled the entire South at the time with little Republican opposition, were divided between liberal and conservative factions. While the Southern Democrats included many New Deal supporters, there were also many conservatives among them who were opposed to the expansion of federal power. Among their leaders were Senators Harry Byrd and Carter Glass of Virginia and Vice President John Nance Garner of Texas. U.S. Senator Josiah Bailey (D-NC) released a "Conservative Manifesto" in December 1937, which included several statements of conservative philosophical tenets, including the line "Give enterprise a chance, and I will give you the guarantees of a happy and prosperous America." The document called for a balanced federal budget, state's rights, and an end to labor union violence and coercion. Over 100,000 copies were distributed and it marked a turning point in terms of congressional support for New Deal legislation.

==== Attacking liberal policies ====
Coalition opposition to Roosevelt's "court packing" Judiciary Reorganization Bill of 1937 was first led by House coalition Democrat and House Judiciary Committee chairman Hatton W. Sumners. Sumners refused to endorse the bill, actively chopping it up within his committee in order to block the bill's chief effect of Supreme Court expansion. Finding such stiff opposition within the House, the administration arranged for the bill to be taken up in the Senate. Congressional Republicans decided to remain silent on the matter, denying pro-bill congressional Democrats the opportunity to use them as a unifying force. Republicans then watched from the sidelines as their Democratic coalition allies split the Democratic party vote in the Senate, defeating the bill.

In the hard-fought 1938 congressional elections, the Republicans scored major gains in both houses, picking up six Senate seats and 80 House seats. Thereafter the conservative Democrats and Republicans in both Houses of Congress would often vote together on major economic issues, thus defeating many proposals by liberal Democrats. The Fair Labor Standards Act of 1938 was the last major New Deal legislation that Roosevelt succeeded in enacting into law. A confidential British Foreign Office analysis of the Senate Foreign Relations Committee in April 1943 stated that although the committee had 15 Democrats, seven Republicans, and one independent, because of the Republican-conservative Democratic alliance only 12 of the 23 members supported Roosevelt's policies. Conservatives also had strong representation in Congress in the post-war years. A handful of liberal measures, notably the minimum wage laws, did pass when the conservative coalition split.

=== After the New Deal (1940–1960) ===
Some infrastructure bills received conservative support, and funding for more highways was approved under both FDR and President Dwight D. Eisenhower; Eisenhower also expanded public housing. While such liberal successes did happen, they often required negotiations between factions controlling different House committees. With conservatives heavily influencing the House agenda through the House Rules Committee and the threat of possible filibusters in the Senate (which then required a 2/3 majority to break) several liberal initiatives such as a health insurance program were stopped. Truman's civil rights act died in Congress, leaving him to use executive orders to act against segregation. Much of Truman's Fair Deal in 1949–1951 was defeated, with exceptions such as a public housing provision when conservatives split. Truman was frustrated by continued conservative strength in Congress, in spite of liberal gains in the 1948 midterm elections. As noted by one study, "First of all, only one-third of the Senate is up for election every two years. In spite of the fact that the House has a narrow liberal majority, there are only 38 votes in the Senate wholeheartedly committed to the liberal program endorsed by the American voters last November." Also, while northern Democrats supported the Truman Administration's social welfare initiatives 91% of the time, the corresponding figure for southern Democrats was 46%.

During his presidency, John F. Kennedy attempted with some success to reduce the conservative hold over the Rules Committee, which had blocked liberal reform measures over the years. As one study has noted, “Proposals for “reform” of the Rules Committee arose because Committee conservatives, retaining their positions through seniority even in “liberal” Congresses, could block liberal legislation either by denying it a rule or by refusing to permit it to go to conference.” As another study has noted, "By the late 1930s, the coalition succeeded in winning enough votes in the Rules Committee to prevent many Roosevelt (and later, Truman) proposals from reaching the floor, even though the measures had been reported by legislative committees of the House. Because of the seniority system, conservatives retained control of the Rules Committee in many Congresses in which, in the House as a whole, liberals were preponderant." In 1961, the House narrowly voted 217–212 in favor of a plan to enlarge the Rules Committee from 12 to 15 members. The aim of this was to provide committee liberals with a majority on most issues "and thereby prevent conservative Republicans and Southern Democrats on the Committee from blocking House floor action on liberal Administration proposals approved by legislative committees." In this the plan was successful, as the enlarged House Rules Committee gave liberals a majority; albeit a precarious one. In January 1963 the enlargement of the Rules Committee was made permanent, with the House voting 235–196 in favor.

In its heyday in the 1940s and 1950s, the coalition's most important Republican leader was Senator Robert A. Taft of Ohio; the leading Democrats in the coalition were Senator Richard Russell, Jr. of Georgia and Congressmen Howard W. Smith of Virginia and Carl Vinson of Georgia. Although the coalition usually voted together on urban and labor issues, they were divided on other economic issues, such as farm and Western issues (such as water). Conservative Southern Democrats generally favored high government spending on rural issues, and in this urban and liberal Democrats supported them while Republicans were opposed. For this reason, Democratic caucuses of 230 to 260 seats were enough to pass Democratic farm programs, whereas on labor issues even Houses with in excess of 280 Democratic Members could not pass labor priorities. Foreign policy goals also presented a contrast. Prior to World War II most, though not all, conservative Republicans were non-interventionists who wanted to stay out of the war at all costs, while most, though not all, Southern conservatives were interventionists who favored helping the British defeat Nazi Germany. After the war, a minority of conservative Republicans (led by Taft) opposed military alliances with other nations, especially NATO, while most Southern Democrats favored such alliances.

During the post-war period, Republican presidents often owed their legislative victories to ad hoc coalitions between conservative Republicans and conservative southern Democrats. The liberal wing of the Democratic Party (elected mainly from Northern cities and Unionized regions), on the other hand, tended to combine with Republicans from the west and the north to put their own legislation through.

==== Civil Rights Era (1960–1972) ====
Under President Lyndon Johnson, who had an intimate knowledge of the inner workings of Congress, liberal Democrats, together with Conservative and Liberal Republicans led by Senate Minority Leader Everett Dirksen, convinced all but six Republicans to vote for cloture on the Civil Rights Act of 1964. This vote broke a Southern filibuster led by Senators Robert Byrd (D-WV) and Strom Thurmond (D-SC). Though a greater percentage of Republicans than Democrats (about 80% versus 60% respectively) voted for cloture and for the bill, the 1964 GOP Presidential nominee, Barry Goldwater (R-AZ), voted against cloture; before his presidential campaign Goldwater had supported civil rights legislation but opposed the Civil Rights Act of 1964 on constitutional grounds, believing private individuals had the right to choose with whom they engaged in business. The GOP was massively defeated in 1964, but recovered its strength in the congressional elections of 1966, and elected Richard Nixon president in 1968. Throughout the 1954–1980 era the Republicans were a minority in both the House and Senate, but most of the time they cooperated with Conservative Democrats.

In defining the size of the Conservative Coalition in 1964, one study noted that

As of adjournment Oct. 3, the potential strength of the conservative coalition was 56 of the 100 votes in the Senate and 280 of the 429 votes in the House (there were 5 vacancies and the House Speaker is not counted because he rarely votes). This constituted a winning majority in each chamber. The figures are based on a lineup of 33 Republicans and 23 Southern Democrats in the Senate and 176 Republicans and 104 Southern Democrats in the House. Counting only bare majorities of the two blocs in the coalition (the point at which the coalition is defined in this study), its strength, assuming all Members voted, would be 17 Republicans and 12 Southern Democrats in the Senate (29 total) and 89 Republicans and 53 Southern Democrats (142 total) in the House. In neither chamber would the coalition have a winning majority. Therefore, whether the coalition won or lost depended not only on how large a majority of Southern Democrats and Republicans it could muster, but also on how many votes it would win away from the opposing faction, the Northern Democrats.

In 1968, Nixon and native Southerner and American Independent candidate George Wallace carried the same number of states in the South. The coalition "found itself frequently allied with a conservative President against the restricted power of the Congressional liberals" in Nixon's first year as president in 1969, according to the 1969 Congressional Quarterly almanac. Conservative senators blocked an amendment that would have blocked the Safeguard anti-ballistic missile but lacked the votes to confirm Supreme Court nominee Clement Haynsworth.

==== Post-Watergate Era (1973–1994) ====
With Nixon's reelection and sweep of the South—as well as nearly every state in the country—in 1972, the Democratic stronghold of the Solid South had fallen to the GOP at the presidential level, save for 1976, 1992, and 1996, when a Southern Democrat was the Democratic nominee. However most of the state and local elections were still dominated by Democrats until the 1990s; at first these long-serving Southern Democrats still wielded great power due to the seniority system through chairing powerful committees; however, the strong Democratic victory in 1974 following the Watergate scandal led to a tremendous number of Northern and liberal Democratic freshmen in House, tilting the balance of the Democratic Caucus away from the Southerners. These Watergate Babies joined forces with more senior liberals and stripped committee chairmanship from three senior Southern Democrats: Wright Patman, William R. Poage, and F. Edward Hébert, and otherwise reformed the House, making it more responsive to the overall Democratic Caucus and leadership, and with less power for committee chairs (and the minority party.) The size of the conservative coalition was diminished as a result of the 1974, with the number of its members in the House of Representatives falling 176 to 163.

Over in the Senate, the similarly large Democratic majority modified Rule 22, which governs the filibuster, shrinking the required majority to invoke cloture in most cases from two-thirds of the Senate to the current three-fifths, or 60 votes. These actions together greatly reduced the power of the Southern Democrats to steer and block legislation in the House and Senate, and reduced the institutional benefits of being loyal to the Democratic Party. Many surviving Southern Democrats switched parties and became Republicans after that party gained a majority in 1995.

Boll weevils was a political term used in the mid-to-late 20th century to describe a bloc of conservative Democrats, mostly Southerners, who remained in the United States Congress throughout the 1970s and 1980s. These included Democratic House members as conservative as Georgia's Larry McDonald, who was also a leader in the John Birch Society. During the administration of Ronald Reagan, the term "boll weevils" was applied to this bloc of conservative Democrats, who consistently voted for Reagan administration policies, such as tax cuts, increases in military spending, and deregulation. The boll weevils were contrasted with the "gypsy moth Republicans"—moderate Republicans from the Northeast and Midwest who opposed many of Reagan's economic policies.

=== Decline and end ===
As a result of the 1994 "Republican Revolution", Republicans became the majority of Southern members of the U.S. House of Representatives for the first time since the Reconstruction era, also replacing many conservative Democratic congressmen. A few Democratic Congressmen switched parties, such as Alabama Senator Richard Shelby. After declining in the 1980s, the conservative coalition ended after 1994. However, many similarly conservative Democrats served until the 2010 midterm elections. The Blue Dog Coalition is considered the main successor to the conservative coalition among Democrats, as it began after the 1994 midterm elections.

== Main members ==
Senators

- Josiah Bailey (D–NC)
- John W. Bricker (R–OH)
- Harry F. Byrd (D–VA)
- Everett Dirksen (R–IL)
- Barry Goldwater (R–AZ)
- Richard Russell Jr. (D–GA)
- Robert A. Taft (R–OH)
- Strom Thurmond (D–SC; later R–SC)
- Arthur Vandenberg (R–MI)
- Joseph McCarthy (R–WI)
- William F. Knowland (R–CA)

Representatives

- Leslie C. Arends (R–IL)
- Howard W. Smith (D–VA)
- Carl Vinson (D–GA)
- Howard Buffett (R–NE)
- Charles A. Halleck (R–IN)

Other

- Vice President John Nance Garner (D–TX)

== See also ==
- American Liberty League
- Democratic Study Group
- Court Packing Plan
- New Deal coalition
- Solid South
- Southernization
