= Conservative Manifesto =

Conservative anti-New Deal position statement

The Conservative Manifesto (officially titled "An Address to the People of the United States") was a position statement drafted in 1937 by a bipartisan conservative coalition of politicians in the United States. Those involved in its creation included longtime opponents of President Franklin Roosevelt's New Deal as well as former supporters who had come to believe its programs were proving ineffective.

== Background ==
The Conservative Manifesto is an economic plan that was based on a set of beliefs that were relatively universal to the conservative coalition on both the Democrat and Republican sides of the aisle of in 1937 and heavily influenced the conservative platform going forward from this point. It was first expressed by a number of conservative Republicans and Democrats who were concerned with Franklin Roosevelt's New Deal plan for solving the Great Depression believing it was steering the country towards collectivism. However, most have reportedly denied involvement and so the responsibility was taken up by Josiah Bailey, a congressman from North Carolina. The document was leaked to the public by the New York Times, in this case two reporters named Joseph Alsop and Robert Kitner During its initial leak by the New York Times it was seen as anti-New Deal, and there is some level of truth to this. Its original intent was to convince Roosevelt that there needed to be some level of balance between enterprise and government and that there was some bipartisan opposition to Roosevelt's New Deal as it was being implemented up until this point. Ultimately the Manifesto was delivered to the people of the United States through a document called "An address to the People of the United States" on 19 December 1937.

== Provisions ==
The full text of the Manifesto, as read into the record of the U.S. Senate, is available here (beginning on page 1937): https://www.congress.gov/75/crecb/1937/12/20/GPO-CRECB-1937-pt2-v82-11.pdf.

Following is a summary of its provisions:

1. Immediate revision of taxes on capital gains and undistributed profits in order to free investment funds.
2. Reduced expenditures to achieve a balanced budget, and thus, to still fears deterring business expansion.
3. An end to coercion and violence in relations between capital and labor.
4. Opposition to unnecessary government competition with private enterprise.
5. Recognition that private investment and enterprise require a reasonable profit.
6. Safeguarding the collateral upon which credit rests.
7. Reduction of taxes, or if this proved impossible at the moment, firm assurance of no further increases.
8. Maintenance of state rights, home rule, and local self-government, except where proved definitely inadequate.
9. Economical and non-political relief to unemployed with maximum local responsibility.
10. Reliance upon the American form of government and the American system of enterprise.

== Josiah Bailey ==
Josiah Bailey was the leader of the conservatives that drafted the Conservative Manifesto. He was a Senator from North Carolina from 1931 to his death in 1946 and served on the committee of commerce and the committee of claims. He was a member of the North Carolina Constitutional Commission, United States Collector of Internal Revenue for North Carolina. He was an editor with the Biblical Recorder, and was a practitioner of law who was admitted to the bar in 1908. He was the only name to actually be applied to the conservative manifesto as he was the only one to not deny his involvement and openly state his support before his official address.

== The New Deal ==
The New Deal was an economic plan put forth by Franklin Roosevelt that was notable in the speed by which it reacted to problems but heavily criticized by opponents the method by which it went about solving those problems which could be seen as hasty. The New Deal:

- Closed many of the weaker banks in the country and halted the export of gold from the U.S.
- Confiscated both gold & gold certificates from the American people, devalued the dollar, and annulled the gold clauses, which brought a (so-far) definitive end to the gold standard in the U.S.
- Created the Agricultural Adjustment Administration in 1933 in order to manipulate prices by buying and holding food, as well as providing subsidies for low production among farmers.
- Created the Tennessee Valley Authority in 1933 to create a hydroelectric project on the Tennessee River.
- Created the National Recovery Administration in order to regulate competition amongst businesses (declared unconstitutional in 1935).
- Created the Federal Emergency Relief Administration in order to create state and local jobs.
- Created the Civilian Conservation Corps to put people to work on natural resource projects.
- Passed the Wagner Act allowing workers to collectively bargain A.K.A. form unions.
- Passed the Social Security Act in order to provide welfare for minors, the disabled, and the elderly.
- Passed the Housing Act to give funds for low income housing.
- Passed the Fair Labor Standards in order to institute the standard work week and the national minimum wage.

There were also many other pieces of legislation passed beyond these, but these are the major laws passed and organizations created.

== Events leading up to the Conservative Manifesto ==
Josiah Bailey was an influential member of the Southern Democratic Conservative Party and had been a United States Senator for North Carolina since 1931. He wished to answer the growing needs of the public while adhering to the traditional values of individualism, hard work, self-help, balanced budgets, strong local governments and administrative efficiency. Bailey respected Roosevelt as a leader and recognized that while Roosevelt intended to be moderate in order to attempt to not fracture the nation but believed that the struggles of the Great Depression was causing him to abandon the conservatives of both parties. He also believed that Roosevelt was experimenting without much thought to economic theory and that he would go too far and cause more harm than good. Josiah Bailey started out his term in the United States Senate being a weak objector of President Franklin D. Roosevelt. He later claimed that this was simply an act so that he may get re-elected and eventually go on the offensive. Bailey agreed with the idea behind the New Deal: to promote enterprise but crack down on extreme corporate profits. It wasn't until he saw Roosevelt begin to build a new party around himself that Bailey began to start making his own move with the manifesto.

== Repercussions ==
Bailey's Conservative Manifesto created a marked change in how politics worked, particularly in the South. This piece consolidated conservative efforts in order to halt further New Deal legislation. This ultimately led to a downturn of Roosevelt's power in congress as more of his policy were denied as the country entered the "Roosevelt Recession", a downturn of the economy that had been looming for the better part of a year, that Roosevelt thought would blow over relatively quickly. As for the president himself, he was decidedly against the ideas of the conservative manifesto as he attempted to break through the conservative wall against the New Deal policy.
