= Josiah Bailey =

American politician (1873–1946)

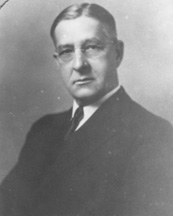

United States Senator from North Carolina
- In office March 4, 1931 – December 15, 1946
- Preceded by: F.M. Simmons
- Succeeded by: William B. Umstead

Personal details
- Born: Josiah William Bailey; September 14, 1873 Warrenton, North Carolina, U.S.
- Died: December 15, 1946 (aged 73) Raleigh, North Carolina, U.S.
- Party: Democratic
- Spouse: Edith Walker Pou (m. 1916)
- Education: Wake Forest College

Josiah William Bailey (September 14, 1873 – December 15, 1946) was an American politician who served as a U.S. senator from the state of North Carolina from 1931 to 1946. Bailey vacillated in his political affiliations. He was a leading reformer in the 1910s, promoting education and Wilsonian programs. As Senator he supported the early New Deal but by 1938 was a leader of the anti-New Deal faction of Southern Democrats. When war loomed in 1939, he moved to support Roosevelt's interventionist foreign policy. Likewise he supported Roosevelt's wartime domestic program, while opposing labor unions.

== Early life and education ==
Born in Warrenton, North Carolina, he grew up in Raleigh and graduated from Wake Forest College (now Wake Forest University).

== Career ==
Before turning to a career in law, Bailey was editor of the Biblical Recorder, a newspaper for North Carolina Baptists. He was a presidential elector in 1908.

Elected to the United States Senate in 1930, defeating longtime incumbent Furnifold McLendel Simmons, Bailey earned a reputation as a conservative while in office. In 1937, he coauthored the bipartisan Conservative Manifesto, a document criticizing President Franklin Roosevelt's New Deal and proposing more conservative alternatives. Among other things, the Manifesto called for lower taxes and less spending.

That same year, Bailey gave a rousing floor speech against President Roosevelt's court-packing bill, which convinced at least three freshman Republicans, thought by Senate Majority Leader Joseph T. Robinson to be definite supporters, to oppose the measure.

A segregationist and white supremacist, Bailey filibustered anti-lynching legislation in 1938.

During his time in office, he served as chairman of the Committee on Claims and Committee on Commerce.

Bailey died in office in 1946.

== See also ==
- List of members of the United States Congress who died in office (1900–1949)

Party political offices
Preceded by Furnifold McLendel Simmons	Democratic nominee for U.S. Senator from North Carolina (Class 2); 1930, 1936, 1942	Succeeded by J. Melville Broughton
U.S. Senate
Preceded by Furnifold McLendel Simmons	U.S. senator (Class 2) from North Carolina; 1931–1946; Served alongside: Cameron A. Morrison, Robert Rice Reynolds, Clyde R. Hoey	Succeeded by William Bradley Umstead
