= Transportation policy of the United States =

Transportation in the United States is governed by laws and regulations of the federal government. The Department of Transportation is responsible for carrying out federal transportation policy, and the Department of Homeland Security is responsible for security in transportation.

== Policy development ==
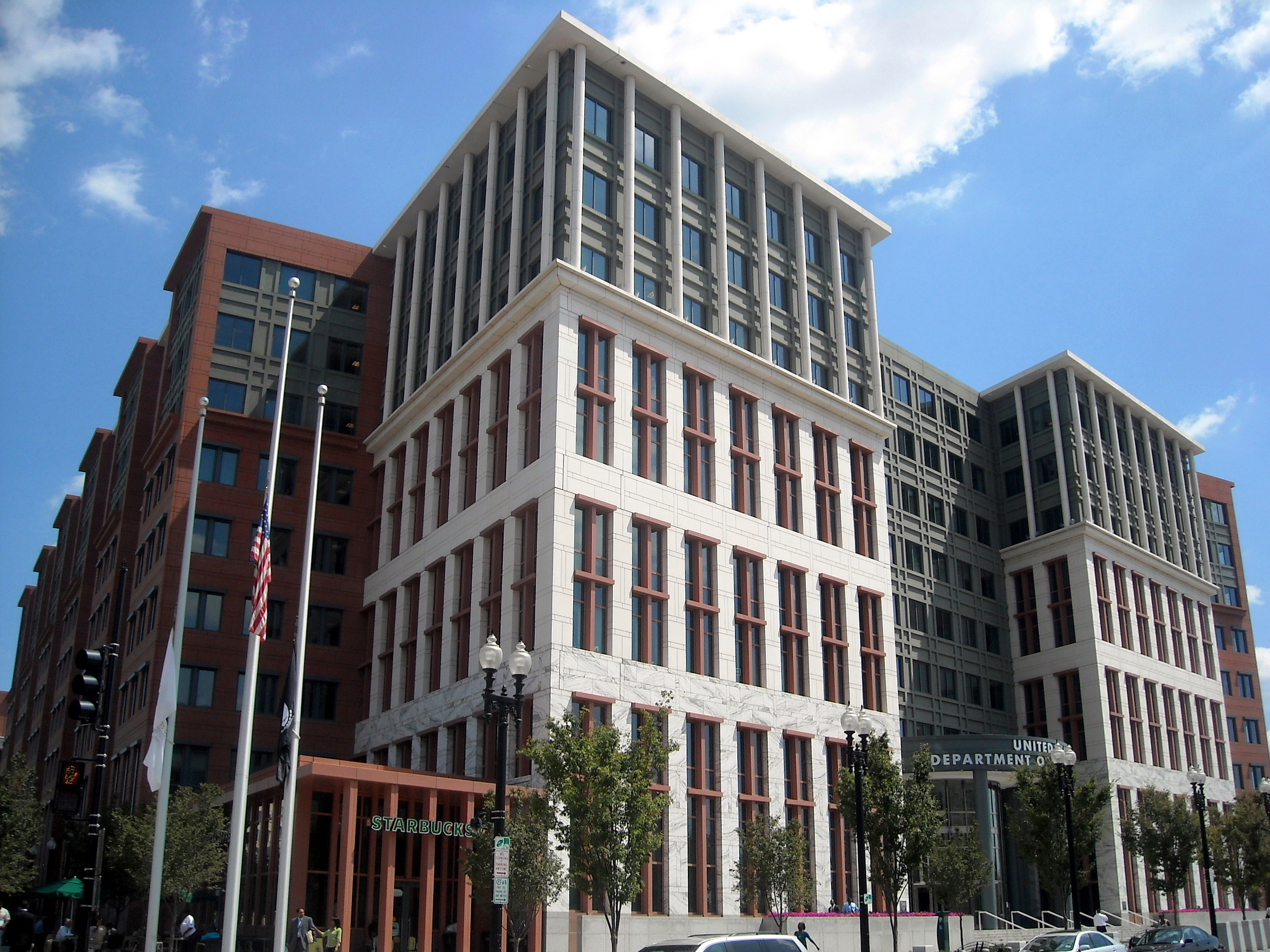
The Department of Transportation headquarters in Washington, D.C.

The Commerce Clause of the United States Constitution grants Congress the power to regulate interstate commerce, and this power was upheld by the Supreme Court in Gibbons v. Ogden. Transportation regulations are created by agencies within the Department of Transportation, and the department is responsible for carrying out federal transportation policy. The mission statement of the Department of Transportation is "to deliver the world’s leading transportation system, serving the American people and economy through the safe, efficient, sustainable, and equitable movement of people and goods." Congress is also authorized to establish post roads as part of the Postal Clause. Federal transportation policy is codified under Title 49 of the United States Code and Title 49 of the Code of Federal Regulations.

The need for federal transportation policy arose as the United States spread westward in the 19th century. The National Road was funded by the federal government in 1806 to connect the East Coast and the Midwest. The General Survey Act of 1824 authorized surveys to plan transportation routes that were considered to be of national importance. The Department of Transportation was established in 1967. The Hazardous Materials Transportation Act of 1975 tasked the Department of Transportation with regulating the transport of hazardous materials. Transportation policy was heavily deregulated in the 1970s and 1980s. Transportation planning was reformed by the Intermodal Surface Transportation Efficiency Act of 1991.

The September 11 attacks and the 2001 anthrax attacks prompted significant changes to transportation security policy in the 2000s. The Aviation and Transportation Security Act created the Transportation Security Administration (TSA), which took over responsibilities for airport security from private companies. The Department of Homeland Security was created by the Homeland Security Act of 2002, and this department took control of the TSA, U.S. Customs and Border Protection, and the United States Coast Guard, among other agencies.

Regarding public transportation, systems are supported by federal funding and managed by state and local governments, with federal funding including revenue from motor fuel taxes and state and local funding including revenue from sale and income taxes. However, there has historically been more focus on the funding of highways rather than public transportation systems, with infrastructure for public transit being defunded to support new construction of highways. Public transportation relies on federal funding to create more choices of transit, maintain affordability, connect with private businesses, and improve mobility efficiency. Public transportation also relies on state and local governments for proper regulation and coordination between agencies, as well as proper distribution of funds.

== Aviation policy ==
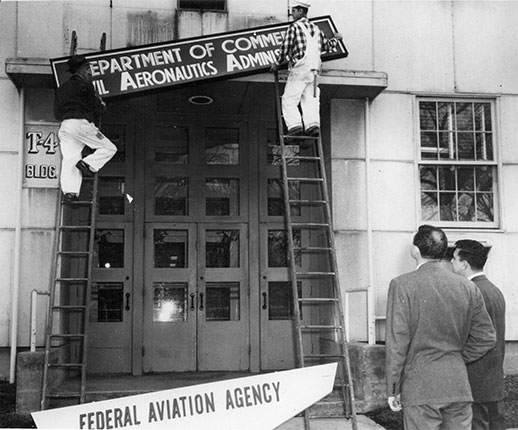
The Civil Aeronautics Administration is replaced by the Federal Aviation Agency.

Air transportation in the United States is overseen by the Federal Aviation Administration, which is responsible for airports, air traffic control, and aviation safety regulations. Regulations vary depending on the type of aircraft, with aircraft of different sizes and purposes subject to different regulations. Other relevant organizations to aviation policy include the Transportation Security Administration, which is responsible for security in airports, and NASA, which is responsible for aviation research. Airports in the United States are typically publicly owned with operations contracted to private companies, though airports may be privatized under the Airport Investment Partnership Program of 1997. Foreign air carriers are required to comply with the International Civil Aviation Organization and to establish an aviation security agreement with the United States before operating in American airspace.

The first federal aviation agency was created in 1915, when the National Advisory Committee for Aeronautics (NACA) was established to conduct aeronautical research. The Air Commerce Act of 1926 established the Aeronautic Branch within the Department of Commerce to regulate aviation, and the branch was reformed into the Bureau of Air Commerce in 1934. In 1938, the Civil Aeronautics Act replaced the Bureau of Air Commerce with the Civil Aeronautics Authority, granting the new agency regulatory powers over airline fares and routes. Two years later, the Civil Aeronautics Authority was split into the Civil Aeronautics Administration, which regulated air traffic control, and the Civil Aeronautics Board, which regulated aviation safety. The Federal Aviation Act of 1958 replaced the Civil Aeronautics Authority with the Federal Aviation Agency, which would later be named the Federal Aviation Administration (FAA). The NACA was also replaced at this time, with the National Aeronautics and Space Administration (NASA) being established to expand aeronautic research to cover space travel research. The National Transportation Safety Board was established in 1967 to take over the accident investigation powers of the Civil Aeronautics Board. The Airline Deregulation Act of 1978 relinquished federal control over airline fares and routes and abolished the Civil Aeronautics Board.

== Maritime policy ==
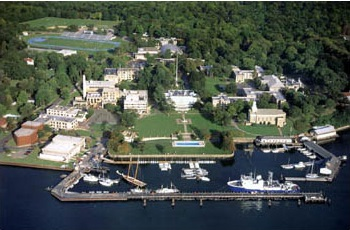
The United States Merchant Marine Academy

Water transport in the United States is overseen by the Maritime Administration, the Great Lakes St. Lawrence Seaway Development Corporation, and the Federal Maritime Commission. The United States Merchant Marine is a fleet of civilian and federal owned ships that transports goods in American waters and serves as an auxiliary to the Navy. Federal courts have jurisdiction over maritime law.

The United States Shipping Board was created in 1916. The Merchant Marine Act of 1920 regulates maritime commerce and restricts cabotage. The Shipping Board was abolished in 1934 and replaced by the United States Maritime Commission in 1936. The Maritime Commission was replaced by the Maritime Administration in 1950.

== Rail policy ==
The Interstate Commerce Commission in 1905

Rail transportation in the United States is overseen by the Federal Railroad Administration. Amtrak is a government-owned corporation responsible for intercity rail.

Several Pacific Railroad Acts were passed in the 1860s to encourage the development of a transcontinental railroad, and the first transcontinental railroad was constructed to connect the eastern railroad networks to the West Coast in 1869. Throughout the 19th century, railroads were privately owned, resulting in natural monopolies and price fixing, particularly among shorter routes. Congress responded by passing the Interstate Commerce Act of 1887, the first law to create a federal regulatory body for a specific industry. The Interstate Commerce Act applied several regulations to railroad prices and established the Interstate Commerce Commission (ICC). The powers of the ICC were expanded by laws such as the Elkins Act of 1903, the Hepburn Act of 1906, the Mann–Elkins Act of 1910, and the Valuation Act of 1913. The Railroad Safety Appliance Act of 1893 was passed as an early regulation of rail safety.

Congress funded high-speed rail with the High-Speed Ground Transportation Act of 1965. The 4R Act of 1976 and the Staggers Rail Act of 1980 deregulated railroads as part of an overhaul of American transportation policy. The ICC was replaced with the Surface Transportation Board in 1995.

== Road policy ==
Interstate highways in the continental United States

Driving in the United States is overseen by the Federal Highway Administration (FAH). The federal government is responsible for the interstate highways, while most other roads are maintained by local and state governments. Road safety is a major concern in American transportation policy. About 95% of transportation-related deaths occur on streets, roads, and highways. Road safety policy is overseen by the Federal Motor Carrier Safety Administration (FMCSA) and the National Highway Traffic Safety Administration (NHTSA). The United States is also a party to the Geneva Convention on Road Traffic.

In 1905, the Office of Public Roads was established by merging the Division of Tests and the Office of Public Road Inquiries. 10% of the excess funds produced by the U.S. Forest Service were appropriated for the production of federal roads serving national forests. Its name was changed to the Bureau of Public Roads in 1919. The Federal Aid Road Act of 1916 was the first law to fund federal highways, and several Federal-Aid Highway Acts were passed through the 20th century to build on this law. The Federal-Aid Highway Act of 1944 authorized the construction of interstate highways, and the federal government set standards with input from state administrations. Upon entering the Korean War military readiness became a concern and the Federal-Aid Highway Act of 1952 increased funding for the highways to this end. President Eisenhower was a strong advocate for a national highway system, and his administration successfully pushed for further expansion in the Federal-Aid Highway Acts of 1954 and 1956. The National Maximum Speed Law was enacted in 1974 and would not be repealed until 1995. The Motor Carrier Act of 1980 deregulated trucking.

The Highway Beautification Act establishes regulations for the environments surrounding federal highways. Interstate Highway standards are regulated by the American Association of State Highway and Transportation Officials. Road signs are standardized by the Federal Highway Administration in the Manual on Uniform Traffic Control Devices. The Highway Trust Fund is used to finance federal road maintenance. Odometer fraud is a federal crime under the Federal Odometer Act.

== See also ==
- Public transportation in the United States
- Transportation safety in the United States
- Timeline of United States railway history
- Space policy of the United States
