= Timeline of the history of the United States (1900–1929) =

This section of the timeline of United States history concern events from 1900 to 1929.

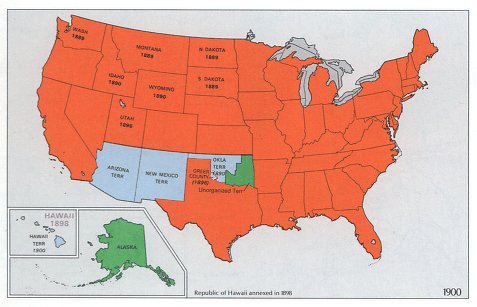
U.S. territorial extent in 1900

== 1900s ==
=== Presidency of William McKinley ===
- 1900 – 1900 United States presidential election: President William McKinley reelected; Theodore Roosevelt elected vice president.

=== Presidency of Theodore Roosevelt ===
- March 4, 1901 – President McKinley begins second term; Roosevelt becomes the 25th vice president.
- September 6, 1901 – McKinley is shot, in Buffalo, New York.
- September 14, 1901 – President McKinley dies, Vice President Roosevelt becomes the 26th president
- 1901 – U.S. Steel founded by John Pierpont Morgan
- 1901 – Hay–Pauncefote Treaty
- 1901 – Louis Armstrong born
- 1902 – Drago Doctrine
- 1902 – First Rose Bowl game played
- 1902 – Newlands Reclamation Act
- 1903 – Great Train Robbery movie opens
- 1903 – Harley-Davidson Motor Company created
- 1903 – Ford Motor Company formed
- 1903 – First World Series
- 1903 – Elkins Act
- 1903 – Big stick ideology
- 1903 – Hay–Bunau-Varilla Treaty
- 1903 – Hay–Herrán Treaty
- 1903 – United States Department of Commerce and Labor created
- 1903 – The Wright brothers make their first powered flight in the Wright Flyer at Kitty Hawk, North Carolina
- 1904 – Roosevelt Corollary to Monroe Doctrine
- 1904 – Panama Canal Zone acquired
- 1904 – Louisiana Purchase Exposition, St. Louis
- 1904 – 1904 United States presidential election: Theodore Roosevelt elected president for full term; Charles W. Fairbanks elected vice president
- March 4, 1905 – President Roosevelt begins full term, Fairbanks becomes the 26th vice president
- 1905 – Niagara Falls conference
- 1905 – Industrial Workers of the World
- 1905 – Albert Einstein publishes his theory of relativity
- 1906 – Susan B. Anthony dies
- 1906 – Algeciras Conference
- 1906 – Pure Food and Drug Act and Federal Meat Inspection Act
- 1906 – Hepburn Act
- 1906 – Theodore Roosevelt negotiates Treaty of Portsmouth, receives Nobel Peace Prize

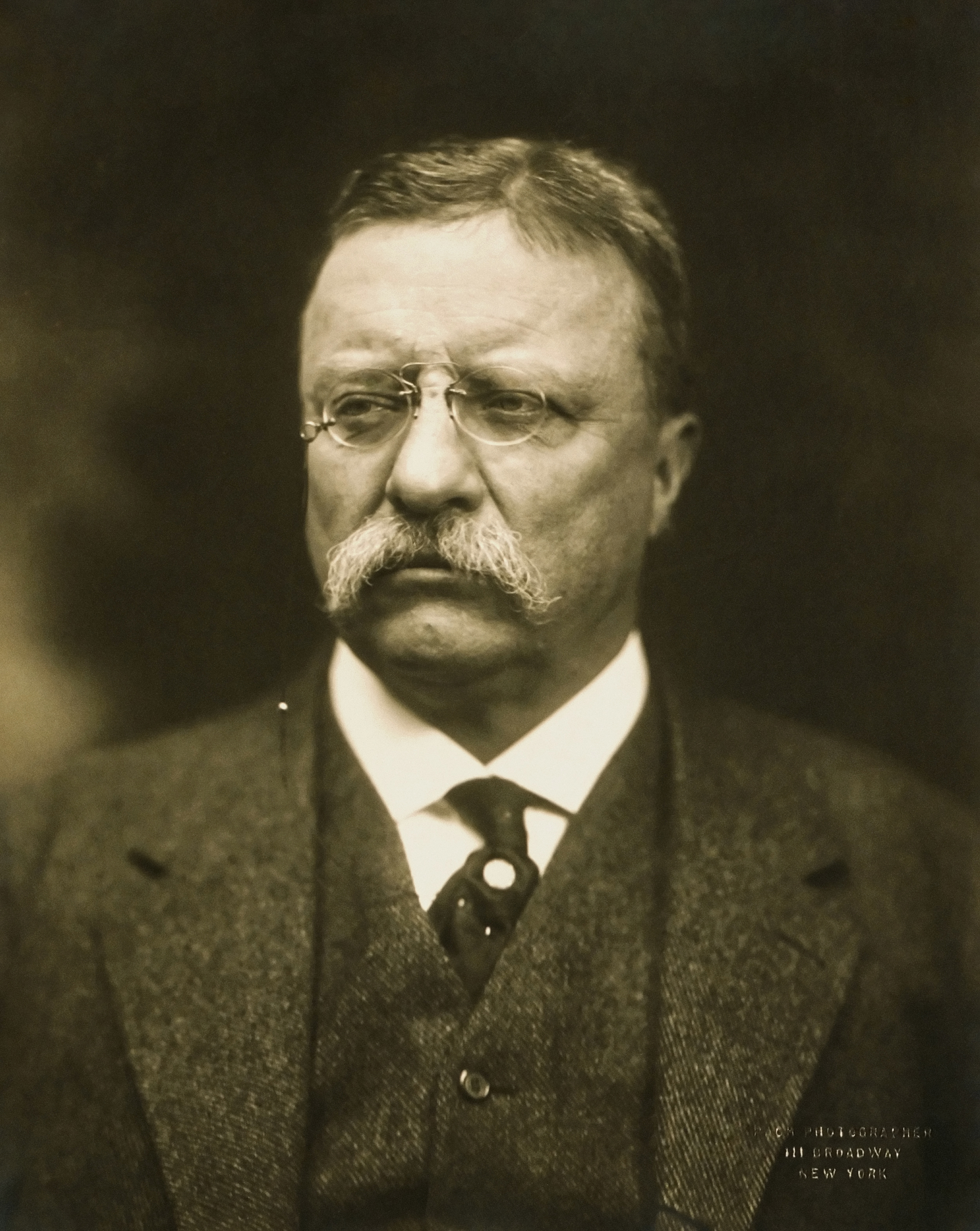
Teddy Roosevelt, the Bull Moose, led American progressives in the early 20th century.

- 1906 – San Francisco earthquake
- 1907 – Oklahoma becomes a state
- 1907 – Gentlemen's Agreement
- 1907 – Coal mine explodes in Monongah, West Virginia, killing at least 361. Worst industrial accident in American history.
- 1908 – Ford Model T appears on the market
- 1908 – Root–Takahira Agreement
- 1908 – Federal Bureau of Investigation established
- 1908 – Aldrich–Vreeland Act
- 1908 – 1908 United States presidential election: William Howard Taft elected president; James S. Sherman vice president. William Jennings Bryan loses for the third and final time.
- 1909 – The U.S. penny is changed to the Abraham Lincoln design

=== Presidency of William Howard Taft ===
- March 4, 1909 – Taft becomes the 27th president; Sherman becomes the 27th vice president
- 1909 – Robert Peary claims to have reached the North Pole
- 1909 – NAACP founded by W. E. B. Du Bois
- 1909 – Payne–Aldrich Tariff Act
- 1909 – Taft implements dollar diplomacy
- 1909 – Pinchot–Ballinger controversy

== 1910s ==
- 1910 – Mann–Elkins Act
- 1910 – Mann Act
- 1911 – Supreme Court breaks up Standard Oil
- 1911 – Triangle Shirtwaist Factory fire
- 1911 – First Indianapolis 500 is staged; Ray Harroun is the first winner
- 1912 – RMS Titanic sank
- 1912 – New Mexico and Arizona become states
- 1912 – Girl Scouts of the USA was started by Juliette Gordon Low
- 1912 – Theodore Roosevelt shot, but not killed, while campaigning for the presidency
- October 30, 1912 – Vice President Sherman dies
- 1912 – 1912 United States presidential election: Woodrow Wilson elected president, Thomas R. Marshall, vice president. Roosevelt becomes the only third party candidate to come in second for well over a century.

=== Presidency of Woodrow Wilson ===
- March 4, 1913 – Wilson becomes the 28th president and Marshall becomes the 28th vice president
- 1913 – Woman Suffrage Procession, a large woman suffrage parade in Washington, D.C., is organized by Alice Paul and held on the eve of Wilson's inaugural
- 1913 – 16th Amendment, establishing an income tax
- 1913 – End of the Philippine–American War
- 1913 – The Armory Show opens in New York City introducing Modern art both American and European to the American public.
- 1913 – 17th Amendment, establishing the direct election of U.S. Senators.
- 1913 – Underwood Tariff
- 1913 – Federal Reserve Act was passed by the 63rd United States Congress and signed into law by President Woodrow Wilson on December 23, 1913. Federal Reserve Act
- 1913 – Henry Ford develops the modern assembly line
- 1914 – Mother's Day established as a national holiday
- 1914 – Federal Trade Commission created
- 1914 – Clayton Antitrust Act
- 1914 – ABC Powers
- 1914 – World War I begins when Austria–Hungary declares war on Serbia
- 1915 – The Birth of a Nation opens
- 1915 – RMS Lusitania sunk
- 1915 – First transcontinental telephone is hooked up
- 1916 – the U.S. acquires Virgin Islands
- 1916 – Jeannette Rankin first woman elected to U.S. congress
- 1916 – Louis Brandeis appointed to Supreme Court
- 1916 – Adamson Act
- 1916 – Federal Farm Loan Act
- 1916 – Jones Act
- 1916 – 1916 United States presidential election: Woodrow Wilson is reelected president and Thomas R. Marshall is reelected vice president, by a mere 3,773 votes in California
- 1916 – Germany agrees to restrict submarine warfare
- 1916 – The Great Migration begins
- 1917 – Zimmermann Telegram
- March 4, 1917 – President Wilson and Vice President Marshall begin their second terms
- 1917 – U.S. enters World War I
- 1917 – Espionage and Sedition Acts
- 1917 – Lansing–Ishii Agreement
- 1917 – National Hockey League formed
- 1917 – U.S. Virgin Islands purchased from Denmark
- 1917 – Temperance movement leads to prohibition laws in 29 states
- 1917–1919 – Silent Sentinels hold a vigil outside the White House gates in favor of women's suffrage, a nearly two–and–a–half year demonstration organized by Alice Paul and the National Woman's Party
- 1917–1920 – First Red Scare, marked by a widespread fear of Bolshevism and anarchism
- 1918 – President Wilson's Fourteen Points, which assures citizens that the Great War was being fought for a moral cause and postwar peace in Europe
- 1918 – Republicans win back Congress in the Midterm elections.
- 1918 – Armistice agreement ends World War I
- 1918 – Spanish flu pandemic begins
- 1918 – Daylight saving time is first adopted
- 1919 – Treaty of Versailles agreed to by victorious powers.
- 1919 – President Wilson has a massive stroke. First Lady Edith Wilson takes over in a "silent coup".
- 1919 – United States Senate rejects Treaty of Versailles and League of Nations
- 1919 – 18th Amendment, establishing Prohibition
- 1919 – Black Sox Scandal during that year's World Series, with the fallout lasting for decades
- 1919 – Sherwood Anderson publishes Winesburg, Ohio
- 1919 – Palmer Raids

== 1920s ==
- 1920 – 19th Amendment, grants women the right to vote
- 1920 – The Great Steel Strike ends
- 1920 – Sacco and Vanzetti arrested
- 1920 – First radio broadcasts, by KDKA in Pittsburgh and WWJ in Detroit
- 1920 – Volstead Act
- 1920 – Esch–Cummins Act
- 1920 – Economy collapses. The Recession of 1920–1921 begins.
- 1920 – National Football League is formed
- 1920 – 1920 United States presidential election: Warren G. Harding elected president, and Calvin Coolidge vice president.

=== Presidency of Warren G. Harding ===
- March 4, 1921 – Harding becomes the 29th president and Coolidge becomes the 29th vice president
- 1921 – Washington Disarmament Conference of 1921
- 1921 – Emergency Quota Act
- 1921 – Tulsa race massacre
- 1921 – After refusing to sign the Treaty of Versailles and join the League of Nations, the U.S. Senate signed separate treaties with Germany, Austria, and Hungary.
- 1922 – Fordney–McCumber Tariff
- 1922 – Lincoln Memorial is dedicated
- 1922 – The Nine Power Treaty
- The Early 1920s – Hollywood becomes the center of the movie industry.
- 1923 – Teapot Dome scandal
- August 2, 1923 – President Harding dies; Vice President Coolidge becomes the 30th president

=== Presidency of Calvin Coolidge ===
- 1923 – The Cotton Club opens in Harlem
- 1923 – Yankee Stadium was built
- 1924 – Immigration Act Basic Law
- 1924 – Indian Citizenship Act
- 1924 – J. Edgar Hoover is appointed director of the Bureau of Investigation – the predecessor to the FBI.,
- 1924 – 1924 United States presidential election: Calvin Coolidge elected president for a full term, Charles G. Dawes elected vice president
- 1924 – The Dawes Plan
- March 4, 1925 – President Coolidge begins full term, Dawes becomes the 30th vice president
- 1925 – Scopes Trial, whose outcome found that the teaching of evolution in the classroom "does not violate church and state or state religion laws but instead, merely prohibits the teaching of evolution on the grounds of intellectual disagreement"
- 1925 – Nellie Tayloe Ross elected governor of Wyoming
- 1925 – WSM broadcasts the Grand Ole Opry for the first time.
- 1925 – Countee Cullen published a book of poems called Color.
- 1925 – F. Scott Fitzgerald publishes The Great Gatsby
- 1926 – NBC founded as the U.S.'s first major broadcast network
- 1926 – United States intervenes in Nicaragua
- 1926 – Opportunity Magazine publishes Langston Hughes' The Weary Blues
- 1926 – The Sun Also Rises by Ernest Hemingway is published.
- 1927 – Sacco and Vanzetti executed, seven years after they were convicted of murdering two men during an armed robbery in Massachusetts
- 1927 – Charles Lindbergh makes first trans–Atlantic flight
- 1927 – The Jazz Singer, the first motion picture with sound, is released
- 1927 – U.S. citizenship granted to inhabitants of U.S. Virgin Islands
- 1927 – Columbia Broadcasting System (later called CBS) was founded, and becomes the second national radio network in the U.S.
- 1927 – The 15,000,000th Model T rolled off the Assembly Line at Ford Motor Company.
- 1927 – Babe Ruth hits a record 60 home runs in a single season
- 1928 – Disney's Steamboat Willie opens, the first animated picture to feature Mickey Mouse
- 1928 – Kellogg–Briand Pact
- 1928 – Amelia Earhart becomes the first woman to fly across the Atlantic Ocean.
- 1928 – First color motion pictures are demonstrated by George Eastman
- 1928 – 1928 United States presidential election: Herbert Hoover elected president and Charles Curtis vice president

=== Presidency of Herbert Hoover ===
- 1929 – St. Valentine's Day Massacre
- March 4, 1929 – Hoover becomes the 31st president and Curtis becomes the 31st vice president.
- 1929 – Wall Street crash of 1929 occurs, resulting in the Great Depression.

== See also ==
- Roaring Twenties
- History of the United States (1865–1917)
- History of the United States (1917–1945)
