= Industrial Commission =

United States government body

The Industrial Commission was a United States government body in existence from 1898 to 1902, to recommend changes in national industrial and economic policy and programs. The commission was established by an act of Congress and was composed of members of Congress and Presidential appointees.

== Background and mission ==
The Panic of 1893 created substantial economic instability and uncertainty throughout the United States in the mid-to late 1890s. One response to this uncertainty was a proposal from the National Association of Manufacturers that Congress create a federal Department of Commerce and Industry. During the 1890s Congress declined to establish such a department, but it considered creating a commission to study the nation's economic situation. In 1897 President Grover Cleveland vetoed a bill that would have established the Industrial Commission. In 1898, after the election of President William McKinley, Congress again approved legislation for the commission, and McKinley signed the bill on June 18, 1898.

The commission was charged with investigating railroad pricing policy, industrial concentration, and the impact of immigration on labor markets, and making recommendations to the President and Congress.

== Membership ==
The commission comprised 19 members, 10 of which were members of Congress and 9 appointed by the President. McKinley selected appointees from the business community and organized labor. Members included McKinley's Ohio running mate, Commissioner Andrew L. Harris (a Governor of Ohio and Civil War General) who served as Chair of the Agriculture Subcommittee.

== Recommendations, dissolution and aftermath ==
In 1902 the commission completed its business and issued a final report totaling about 1,000 pages in 18 volumes. Included among its many recommendations were a call for more extensive federal regulation of trusts, and that the financial records of national corporations and banks be subject to inspection at all times.

Congress established the United States Department of Commerce and Labor in 1903. President Theodore Roosevelt supported enforcement of the Sherman Antitrust Act and expanded regulation of trusts during his administration. Legislative reforms included the Elkins Act (1903) and the Hepburn Act (1906), which expanded the jurisdiction of the Interstate Commerce Commission in the regulation of railroads.

== See also ==
- Commission on Industrial Relations, also known as the Walsh Commission, established in 1912
