= Square Deal =

Domestic policy of U.S. president Theodore Roosevelt

- President Roosevelt draws the Square Deal - labor, railroads, capital, and government - for Railroad President Mellen's benefit
- Founder: Theodore Roosevelt
- Ideology: Progressivism
- Political position: Centre to centre-left
- Major Legislation: Elkins Act (1903); Hepburn Act (1906); Pure Food and Drug Act (1906); Meat Inspection Act (1906); Trust-busting (Northern Securities Co.)

Party flag

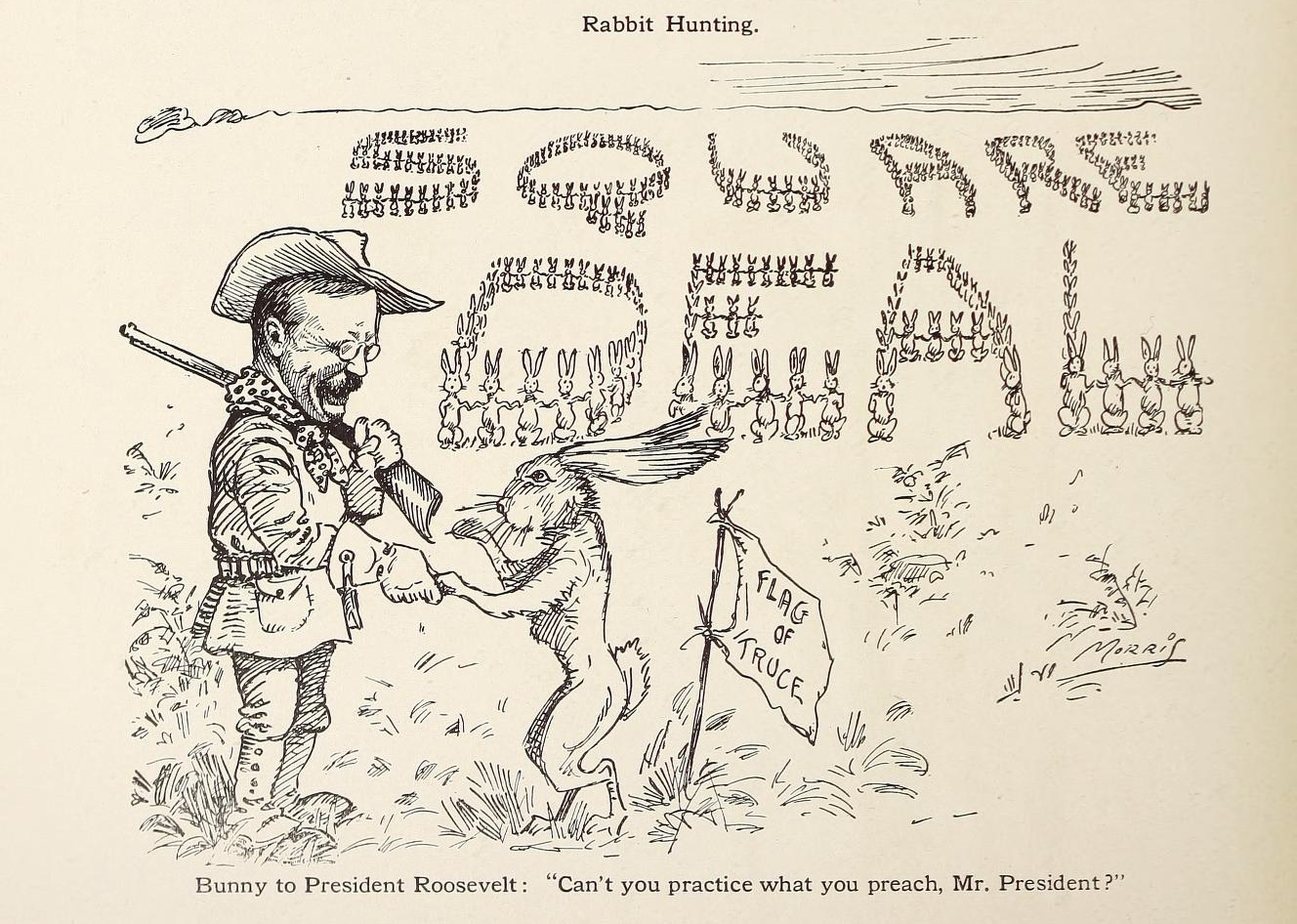
Editorial cartoon by William C. Morris, c. 1906–1908

The Square Deal was Theodore Roosevelt's domestic program, which reflected his three major goals: conservation of natural resources, corporate law, and consumer protection.

These three demands are often referred to as the "three C's" of Roosevelt's Square Deal. Thus, it aimed at helping middle-class citizens and involved attacking plutocracy and bad trusts while at the same time protecting business from the most extreme demands of organized labor. He explained in 1901–1909:

When I say that I am for the square deal, I mean not merely that I stand for fair play under the present rules of the game, but that I stand for having those rules changed so as to work for a more substantial equality of opportunity and of reward for equally good service.

A Progressive Era Republican, Roosevelt believed in government action to mitigate social evils, and as president he in 1908 denounced "the representatives of predatory wealth" as guilty of "all forms of iniquity from the oppression of wage workers to unfair and unwholesome methods of crushing competition, and to defrauding the public by stock-jobbing and the manipulation of securities."

During his second term, Roosevelt tried to extend his Square Deal further, but was blocked by conservative Republicans in Congress.

== History ==
=== Coining of the term ===
Address to the Boys Progressive League "A square deal for every man and every woman in the United States. . .") by former President Theodore Roosevelt, New York City, recorded March 4, 1913 (according to Allen Koenigsberg's latest research).

The press was using the term "Square Deal" as early as 1871 in a New York Times local news article that reads "Many of the inscriptions on the front of trucks, drays, and other vehicles are quite amusing. On one there is a picture of a hand containing four aces, and over it is inscribed square deal." In 1888, in "letters from the people" (letters to the editor), one writer signed off as "Square Deal". In 1890, the phrase started to appear in headlines, e.g., "Give China a Square Deal" and "Not a Square Deal".

An early usage of "square deal" by Theodore Roosevelt in the press occurred in 1899, when The New York Times quoted his saying, "I did not appoint a man because he came from Dr. Wall's or any other church; I gave each man a square deal on his own account. That is what I mean by Americanism."

In 1901, he declared "a square deal for every man, big or small, rich or poor" during a speech in Lynn, Massachusetts, recorded by stereograph (photo) image.

In a 1903 speech in Springfield, Illinois, he stated, "It seems to me eminently fitting that the guard around the tomb of Lincoln should be composed of colored soldiers. It was my own good fortune at Santiago to serve beside colored troops. A man who is good enough to shed his blood for his country is good enough to be given a square deal afterwards."

In October 1904, while Roosevelt was readying publication of his book A Square Deal for Every Man (Chicago, R. J. Thompson, 1905), The New York Times reported:

No sooner have the Democrats concluded their task of going through the President's many books with a fine-tooth comb to ferret out campaign material, than Republicans come forth with a pamphlet of about the same size, and prepared on a somewhat similar plan, making conspicuous Mr. Roosevelt's sentiments on numerous civic and governmental questions. It Is entitled "A Square Deal for Every Man" and the paragraphs printed, which are more numerous than those in "Roosevelt, Historian", are culled, to some extent, from the same volumes. Republicans are now considering the purchase of over a million of those booklets. Chairman Cortelyou has discussed has matter, and negotiations on the subject were continued yesterday at the White House.

—

The 94-page pamphlet's 75 topics include: America, A Good American, Alaska, Anarchy, Army and Navy, Capital, Character, Charity, Citizenship, Farmer, Peace, Publicity, Trusts, Weaklings, and World Power. Some imitate the form of proverbs. During 1905, Roosevelt capitalized on his slogan in the newspapers, who added "square deal" to headlines:

- "A 'Square Deal' for the Negro" (January 17) about "negro suffrage"
- "A Square Deal for the South" (January 27)
- "Talks of Square Deal: President's Address at Press Club Banquet" (February 14)
- "Upholds the President: Mormons Know He Will Give Them a Square Deal" (April 10)
- "The 'Square Deal' Defined: President Offers Some Explanations of the Meaning of the Term" (April 15)
- "The Square Deal" (May 18)

The press praised Roosevelt's Square Deal:

His explanation of that is entirely plain and understandable. It contemplates no injury to any interest, but an opportunity for all on absolutely equal terms. That is a principle the justice of which is universally recognized, and which ought to be more generally acknowledged in this country than in any other.

—

The press also criticized him for it:

In his insistence upon "a square deal for all," President Roosevelt uses a phrase which is as catchy and as impracticable as either of those "glittering generalities" or the Declaration of Independence that have been shining and ringing all over the civilized world for a hundred and twenty-nine years and bid fair to serve for centuries to come as a potent inspiration in every struggle against tyranny and oppression, every movement toward greater liberty.

—

Other politicians tried to capitalize on the phrase, too, e.g., U.S. Representative Henry Sherman Boutell of Illinois.

=== Initial legislation ===
In 1903, with Roosevelt's support, Congress passed the Elkins Act. This stated that railroads were not allowed to give rebates to favored companies any longer. These rebates had treated small Midwestern farmers unfairly by not allowing them equal access to the services of the railroad. The Interstate Commerce Commission controlled the prices that railroads could charge.

Legislation was passed which specified that meat had to be processed safely with proper sanitation. Foodstuffs and drugs could no longer be mislabeled, nor could consumers be deliberately misled.

Roosevelt gave high priority to environmental conservation, and safeguarded millions of acres of wilderness from commercial exploitation. Roosevelt's conservation efforts were driven by practicality as well as by a love for nature. Influenced by early wise-use advocates like Gifford Pinchot, Roosevelt believed that nature existed to benefit humanity. In a conserved wilderness, water could be taken to irrigate farmland, sport could be had, and timber could be harvested.

Acting on these beliefs, Roosevelt set up the federal Reclamation Service in 1902. The agency, through the use of dams and irrigation, created arable land in areas that had been too dry to farm, and the Reclamation Service eventually brought millions of acres of farmland into service. During Roosevelt's time in office, 24 reclamation projects were set up, and 150 national forests were created.

=== Second term ===
Roosevelt, moving to the left of his Republican Party base, called for a series of reforms that were mostly not passed. He sought a national incorporation law. All corporations had state charters, which varied greatly state by state. He called for a federal income tax, but the Supreme Court had ruled in 1895 that any income tax would require a constitutional amendment. Roosevelt sought an inheritance tax so the great family fortunes could not be inherited without the tax for generations.

In the area of labor legislation, Roosevelt called for limits on the use of court injunctions against labor unions during strikes. Injunctions were a powerful weapon that mostly helped business. He wanted an employee liability law for industrial injuries, pre-empting state laws. He called for an eight-hour law for federal employees. In other areas he also sought a postal savings system to provide competition to local banks, and, finally, campaign finance reform.

He secured passage of the Hepburn Act in 1906, which increased the regulating power of the Interstate Commerce Commission. Eventually, many of the proposals he championed were enacted under Democrats Woodrow Wilson and Franklin Delano Roosevelt. When Roosevelt ran for president on an independent Progressive Party ticket in 1912, in addition to these policies he proposed stringent new controls on the court system, especially state courts, to make them more democratic. His court policies in particular caused his anointed successor, William Howard Taft, to lead a counter-crusade which defeated Roosevelt in the Republican presidential primaries in 1912.

== Impact and specific provisions ==
=== Labor ===
Labor unions in the age of Samuel Gompers were generally on the Democratic side, but Roosevelt felt that favorable policies toward them would gain votes or at least neutralize their opposition. He had opposed unions in 1896, when they supported William Jennings Bryan, then came to appreciate their value after 1900. He played a central role in negotiating a compromise to end the Coal strike of 1902, which was threatening the nation's energy supply. He decided they also needed a square deal, and a stronger voice and collective bargaining with corporations.

- A measure was approved that providing that eight hours should constitute a day's labor on irrigation works.
- Abolished slavery and involuntary servitude in the Philippine Islands, with violation of the Act being punishable by forfeiture of contracts and a fine of not less than $10,000.
- A measure was approved safeguarding the lives of employees in mines in U.S. territories by regulating the amount of ventilation and providing that entries, etc., should be kept well dampened with water to cause coal dust to settle.
- A measure was approved exempting from taxation in the District of Columbia household effects to the value of $1,000, wearing apparel, libraries, school books, family portraits and heirlooms.
- A measure was approved providing for Government supervision of employment agencies in the District of Columbia.
- An Act relating to safety appliances on railroad trains was improved.
- A measure was approved requiring the collection of labor statistics in Hawaii.
- A measure was approved for the better protection of seamen.
- A measure was approved for securing the wages of employees on public works.
- A measure was approved for protecting the health of motormen and conductors on street railways in the District of Columbia.
- A measure was approved for a more thorough inspection of steam vessels.
- A measure was approved for safeguarding factory employees in the District of Columbia against accidents.
- A measure was approved making wages preferred claims.
- A measure was approved to provide for an investigation of women and child labor in the United States.
- A measure was approved restricting child labor in the District of Columbia.
- A measure was approved incorporating the National Child Labor Committee.
- A measure was approved establishing the Foundation for the Promotion of Industrial Peace.
- A measure was approved to regulate the hours of labor of railroad employees in the District of Columbia and the Territories.
- A measure was approved making railroad companies engaged in interstate commerce or operating in the District of Columbia, the Territories, the Panama Canal Zone, or other United States possessions, liable for injuries to, or death of, employees while on duty.
- A measure was approved safeguarding the lives of miners in the U.S. Territories and the District of Alaska.
- A measure was approved permitting leave of absence, with pay, on Labor Day to per diem employees of the Government.
- A measure was approved granting to injured employees on the Panama Canal absence, with pay for time necessarily lost as a result of injuries.
- A measure was approved for the inspection of boilers.
- A measure was approved prohibiting peonage.
- The first Federal employment service (forerunner of the United States Employment Service) was created in the Bureau of Immigration and Naturalization, Department of Commerce and Labor (1907).

=== Health and welfare ===
- The Pure Food and Drug Act of 1906 and the Meat Inspection Act of 1906 were both widely accredited from Upton Sinclair's The Jungle.
- The Federal Employers Liability Act of 1908.
- The Federal Employee's Compensation Act of 1908 provided workers' compensation for a number of federal employees.
- Legislation was introduced (1902) that expanded the scientific work of the Acoustic Laboratory and appropriated a budget specific to the laboratory's work.
- In 1902 Congress gave authority to strengthen the Public Health Service.
- An Act of 1903 enabled the Secretary of Agriculture "to prevent the spread of contagious and infectious diseases of live-stock."
- In 1902, $5,000 was appropriated to the Bureau of Chemistry by Congress "to study chemical preservatives and colors and their effects on digestion and health," with studies drawing attention to the problem of food adulteration.
- The Oleomargarine Act (1902) authorized the definition of oleomargarine "for the purpose of collecting taxes on imported product, and also to discourage imitation of butter."
- The Biologics Control Act was passed (1902) "to ensure purity and safety of serums, vaccines, and similar products used to prevent or treat diseases in humans."
- The Bureau of the Census was authorized (1902) to collect information related to health and disease from around the country.
- The first Certified Color Regulations (1907) listed 7 colors found suitable for use in foods.
- A Housing Commission was appointed (1908) to evaluate slum conditions.
- Corporate welfare work was encouraged by the Roosevelt Administration; a policy continued under Roosevelt's successor William Howard Taft.

=== Conservation ===
- The Newlands Reclamation Act (1902) led to the first 21 federal irrigation projects such as Theodore Roosevelt Dam in Arizona.
- The Transfer Act of 1905.
- The Antiquities Act of 1906 gave the president authority to restrict the use of particular public lands in America.
- 16 million additional acres of Western forest were signed into federal protection.
- In Alaska, Roosevelt created the Tongass and the Chugach forest reserves.
- In Hawaii, Roosevelt set several small islands aside as the Hawaiian Islands Bird Reservation.
- Pelican Island in Florida was proclaimed as the first federal bird reservation in 1903 (total of 51 bird reservations established by Roosevelt administration).
- Improvements of waterways and reservation of water power sites were carried out.
- The provisions of the Newlands Act were extended to Texas (1906).
- The National Forest Service was established (1905).
- A National Conservation Commission was appointed (1908) to prepare "first inventory of natural resources."
- From 1901 to 1909, Roosevelt signed legislation establishing five national parks: Crater Lake, Oregon; Wind Cave, South Dakota; Sullys Hill, North Dakota; Mesa Verde, Colorado; and Platt, Oklahoma.
- In one of a series of acts aimed at regulating the harvesting of Alaskan wildlife, Congress passed "An Act For the protection of game in Alaska, and for other purposes," known as the Alaska Game Act, protecting certain game animals in Alaska.
- A preservation of remaining buffalo herds was started.
- 18 national monuments were declared during Roosevelt's time in office.

=== Public projects ===
- The Newlands Reclamation Act of 1902.
- The Kinkaid Act of 1904.
- The Forest Homestead Act (1906) allowed the patenting, or deeding, of millions of acres of potential agricultural land within the national forests.
- The Inland Waterways Commission was created (1907) for the purpose of developing a new approach to river development.

=== Veterans ===
- The Civil War program was transformed into a system of old-age pensions for Union veterans. His executive order of 1904 declared that old age itself constituted a disability: "When a claimant has passed the age of sixty-two years he is disabled one-half in ability to perform manual labor and is entitled to be rated at six dollars a month; after sixty-five years at eight dollars a month; after sixty-eight years at ten dollars a month, and after seventy years at twelve dollars a month." This order provided tens of thousands of Union veterans with non-contributory old-age pensions.
- A 1906 statute provided for veterans that "the age of sixty-two years and over shall be considered a permanent specific disability within the meaning of the pension laws."
- In 1907, the pension provisions of the federal government were extended to all Civil War Union veterans, regardless of whether they were disabled.

=== Education ===
- The Adams Act (1906) provided additional funds to states for agricultural research.
- The Carnegie Foundation for the Advancement of Teaching was chartered by an Act of Congress (1906).
- The 1907 Nelson Amendment to the second Morrill Act provided $25,000 annually in order to assist teacher-training courses in the mechanical arts and agriculture.

=== Rural areas ===
- The Rural Free Delivery postal service was made permanent (1902).
- The Alaska Native Allotment Act (1906) authorized the Secretary of the Interior "to allot individual Alaska Natives a homestead of up to 160 acres of land."
- A Commission on Country Life was established (1908) to investigate ways of making country life more attractive.

=== Business regulation ===
- The Expediting Act of 1903.
- The Elkins Act 1903.
- A Department of Commerce and Labor was set up (1903) to regulate business and enforce economic regulations.
- The Hepburn Act of 1906 strengthened the Interstate Commerce Commission; prior to that, the commission had minimal resources to carry out its duties.
- Under the Immunity of Witnesses Act (1906) corporate officials could no longer make a plea of immunity to avoid testifying in cases which dealt with the illegal activities of their corporations.
- The Aldrich–Vreeland Act (1908) introduced government regulation of any issues of "emergency" currency.

== See also ==
- Progressive Party (United States, 1912)
- New Nationalism (Theodore Roosevelt)
- The New Freedom
- New Deal (1933-1938)
- Fair Deal (1945-1953)
- Share Our Wealth (1934)
