= Valuation Act =

American federal law passed in 1913

- Other short titles: Physical Valuation Act of 1913
- Long title: An Act to amend an Act entitled "An Act to regulate commerce," approved February fourth, eighteen hundred and eighty-seven, and all Acts amendatory thereof by providing for physical valuation of the property of carriers subject thereto and securing information concerning their stocks and bonds and boards of directors
- Enacted by: the 62nd United States Congress
- Effective: March 1, 1913

Citations
- Public law: Public Law 62-400
- Statutes at Large: 37 Stat. 701

Codification
- Acts amended: Interstate Commerce Act of 1887
- U.S.C. sections created: Section 19a (Interstate Commerce Act)

Legislative history
- Introduced in the House of Representatives as H.R. 22593 by William C. Adamson (D‑GA) on March 25, 1912; Committee consideration by House Committee on Interstate and Foreign Commerce; Passed the House of Representatives on December 5, 1912 (Voice vote); Passed the Senate on February 24, 1913 (Voice vote); Reported by the joint conference committee on February 24 – February 25, 1913; agreed to by the House of Representatives on February 27, 1913 (Voice vote) and by the Senate on February 28, 1913 (Voice vote); Signed into law by President William Howard Taft on March 1, 1913

Major amendments
- Esch-Cummins Act (1920)

Valuation map of the Luverne Branch in Luverne, Alabama, a long-since abandoned rail line

Valuation map of Moncrief Yard in Jacksonville, FL

The Valuation Act is a 1913 United States federal law that required the Interstate Commerce Commission (ICC) to assess the value of railroad property. This information would be used to set rates for the transport of freight.

== Background ==
The act was the brainchild of ICC commissioners Charles A. Prouty and Franklin K. Lane. Its objective was the setting of fair rates for freight shipments. It was a classic piece of Progressive Era legislation designed to find a scientific basis for setting tariffs (shipping charges) by determining the correct value of each railroad's real property and assets. Members of Congress assumed that with this information, the ICC would be able to set rates according to the principle of a reasonable rate of return on the real value of each railroad and the industry as a whole.

== Implementation ==
The law amended the Interstate Commerce Act of 1887 and required the ICC to organize a Bureau of Valuation in order to undertake the assessments. The ICC formulated a set of procedural and reporting standards for the valuation process, and then permitted the individual railroads to complete the valuation under the nominal supervision of an ICC administration. In 1914 Prouty resigned from his Commissioner post at the ICC to serve as the first Valuation Bureau Chairman.

Although the original intent of the Valuation Act was to prepare a one-time assessment of railroad assets, subsequent legislation had the effect of prolonging the process. The Esch-Cummins Act of 1920 expanded the ICC's rate-setting responsibilities, and the agency in turn required updated valuation data from the railroads. The enlarged process led to a major increase in ICC staff, and the valuations continued for almost 20 years.

Congress passed a minor amendment to the law in 1922.

== Aftermath ==
The valuation process turned out to be of limited use in helping the ICC set rates fairly.

== See also ==
- Hepburn Act (1906; authorized ICC to set rates)
- History of rail transport in the United States
