= Trust (business) =

Business group designed to reduce competition in a market

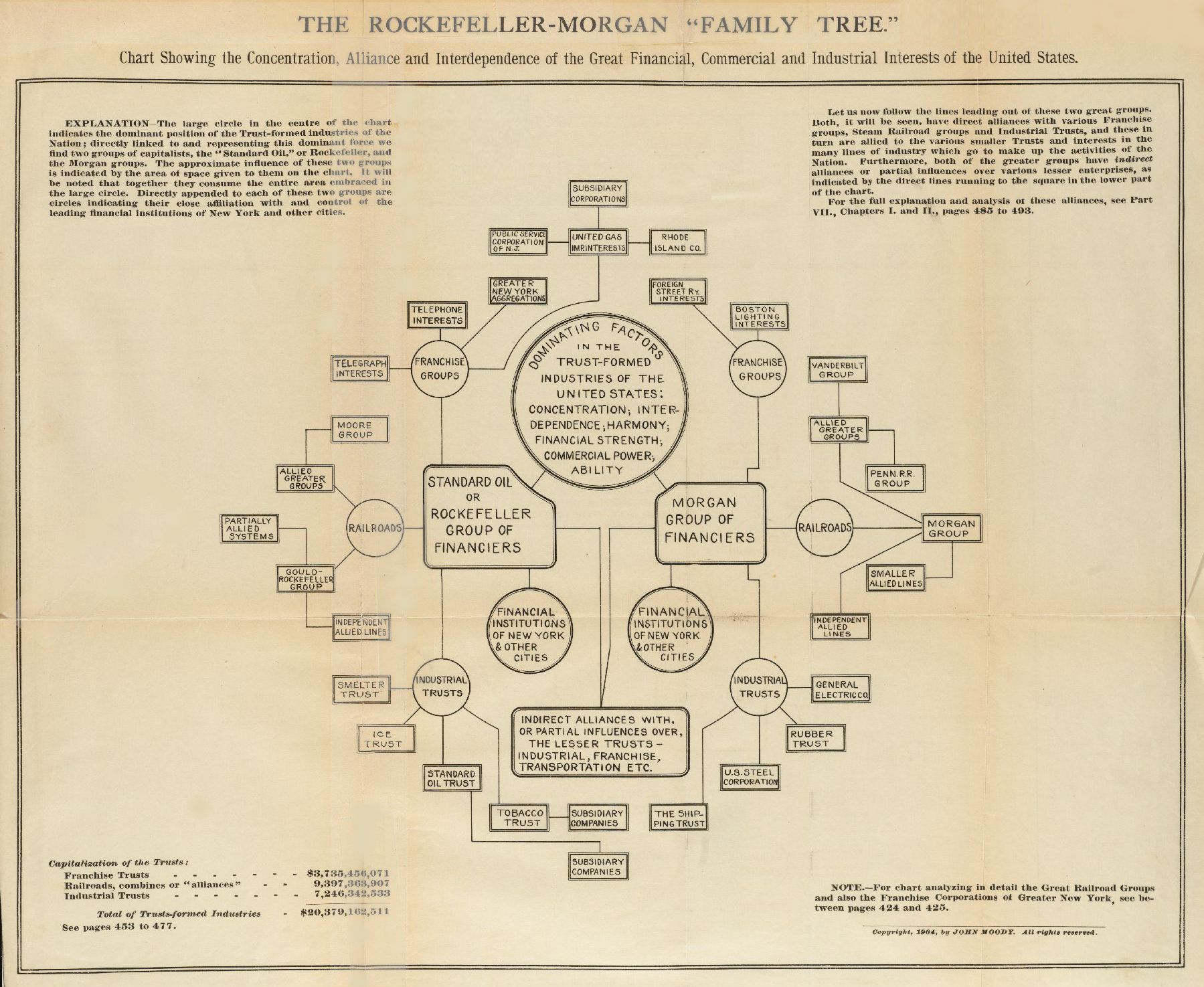
The Rockefeller-Morgan Family Tree (1904), which depicts how the largest trusts at the turn of the 20th century were in turn connected to each other

A trust or corporate trust is a large grouping of business interests with significant market power, which may be embodied as a corporation or as a group of corporations that cooperate with one another in various ways. These ways can include constituting a trade association, owning participating interests in one another, constituting a corporate group (sometimes specifically a conglomerate), or combinations thereof. The term trust is often used in a historical sense to refer to monopolies or near-monopolies in the United States during the Second Industrial Revolution in the 19th century and early 20th century. The use of corporate trusts during this period is the historical reason for the name "antitrust law".

In the broader sense of the term, relating to trust law, a trust is a legal arrangement based on principles developed and recognised over centuries in English law, specifically in equity, by which one party conveys legal possession and title of certain property to a second party, called a trustee. The trustee holds the property, while any benefit from the property accrues to another person, the beneficiary. Trusts are commonly used to hold inheritances for the benefit of children and other family members, for example. In business, such trusts, with corporate entities as the trustees, have sometimes been used to combine several large businesses in order to exert complete control over a market, which is how the narrower sense of the term grew out of the broader sense.

In the United States, the use of corporate trusts died out in the early 20th century as U.S. states passed laws making it easier to create new corporations.

== History ==
The OED (Oxford English Dictionary) dates use of the word trust in a business organization sense from 1825.

The business or "corporate" trust came into use in the 19th-century United States, during the Gilded Age, as a legal device to consolidate industrial activity across state lines. In 1882 John D. Rockefeller and other owners of Standard Oil faced several obstacles to managing and profiting from their large oil refining business. The existing approach of separately owning and dealing with several companies in each state was unwieldy, often resulting in turf battles and non-uniform practices. Furthermore, the Pennsylvania legislature proposed to tax out-of-state corporations on their entire business activity. Concerned that other states could follow, Standard Oil had its attorney Samuel C. T. Dodd adapt the common law instrument of a trust to avoid cross-state taxation and to impose a single management hierarchy. The Standard Oil Trust was formed pursuant to a trust agreement in which the individual shareholders of many separate corporations agreed to convey their shares to the trust; it ended up entirely owning 14 corporations and also exercised majority control over 26 others. Nine individuals held trust certificates and acted as the trust's board of trustees. One of those trustees, Rockefeller himself, held 41% of the trust certificates; the next most powerful trustee held about 13%. This trust became a model for other industries.

An 1888 article explained the difference between trusts in the traditional sense and the new corporate trusts:

A trust is ... simply the case of one person holding the title of property, whether land or chattels, for the benefit of another, termed a beneficiary. Nothing can be more common or more useful. But the word is now loosely applied to a certain class of commercial agreements and, by reason of a popular and unreasoning dread of their effect, the term itself has become contaminated. This is unfortunate, for it is difficult to find a substitute for it. There may, of course, be illegal trusts; but a trust in and by itself is not illegal: when resorted to for a proper purpose, it has been for centuries enforced by courts of justice, and is, in fact, the creature of a court of equity.

— Theodore Dwight, Political Science Quarterly

Although such corporate trusts were initially set up to improve the organization of large businesses, they soon faced widespread accusations of abusing their market power to engage in anticompetitive business practices (in order to establish and maintain monopolies). Such accusations caused the term trust to become strongly associated with such practices among the American public and led to the enactment in 1890 of the Sherman Antitrust Act, the first U.S. federal competition statute.

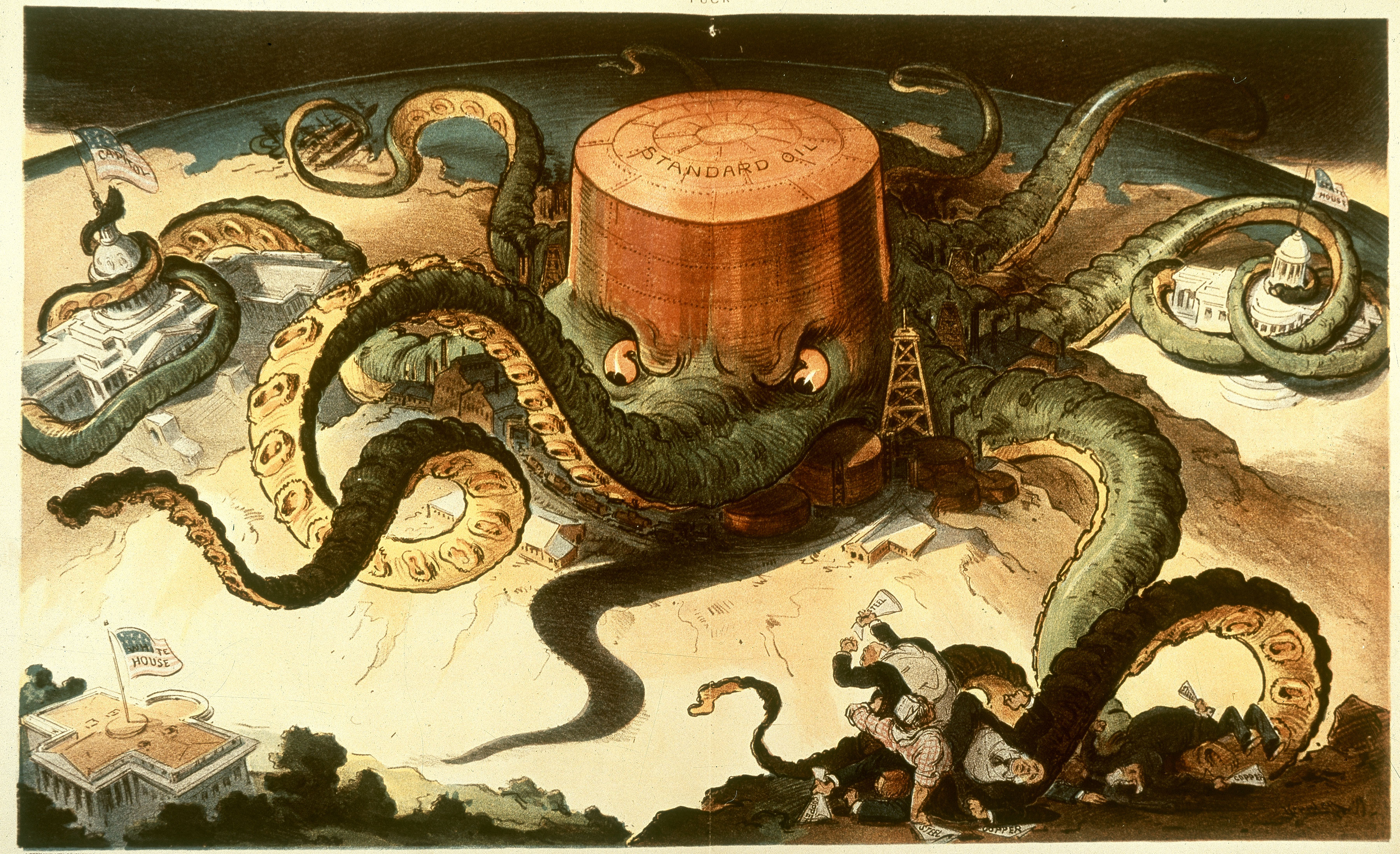
Octopus representing Standard Oil with arms wrapped around U.S. Congress and steel, copper, and shipping industries, and reaching for the White House

Meanwhile, trust agreements, the legal instruments used to create the corporate trusts, received a hostile reception in state courts during the 1880s and were quickly phased out in the 1890s in favor of other devices like holding companies for maintaining centralized corporate control. For example, the Standard Oil Trust terminated its own trust agreement in March 1892. Regardless, the name stuck, and American competition laws are known today as antitrust laws as a result of the historical public aversion to trusts, while other countries use the term competition laws instead.

Monopoly pricing had also become a contentious issue, with several states passing Granger Laws to regulate railroad and grain elevator prices to protect farmers. The Interstate Commerce Act of 1887 created the Interstate Commerce Commission for similar purposes, federalizing the movement against anti-competitive business practices.

In 1898, President William McKinley launched the trust-busting era (one aspect of the Progressive Era) when he appointed the U.S. Industrial Commission. Theodore Roosevelt seized upon the commission's report and based much of his presidency (1901–1909) on trust-busting.

Prominent trusts included:

- Standard Oil
- U.S. Steel
- the American Tobacco Company
- the International Mercantile Marine Company
- the match companies controlled by Ivar Kreuger, the Match King

Other companies also formed trusts, such as the Motion Picture Patents Company or Edison Trust which controlled the movie patents. Patents were also important to the Bell Telephone Company, as indicated by the massive litigation that came to be known as The Telephone Cases.

== See also ==
- Chaebol
- Keiretsu
- Trust company

== Bibliography ==
- Moody, John (1904). The Truth About The Trusts: A Description and Analysis of the American Trust Movement. New York: Moody Publishing. XIII. OCLC 1832950.
- Boudreaux, Donald J.; DiLorenzo, Thomas J. (1993). "The Protectionist Roots of Antitrust" (PDF). The Review of Austrian Economics. 6 (2): 81–96.
- Orbach, Barak; Campbell, Grace (2012). "The Antitrust Curse of Bigness". Southern California Law Review.
