= Esch–Cummins Act =

Transportation Act of 1920
- Other short titles: Esch–Cummins Act
- Long title: An Act To provide for the termination of Federal control of railroads and systems of transportation; to provide for the settlement of disputes between carriers and their employees; to further amend an Act entitled "An Act to regulate commerce," approved February fourth, eighteen hundred and eighty-seven, as amended, and for other purposes
- Enacted by: the 66th United States Congress
- Effective: March 1, 1920

Citations
- Public law: Public Law 66-152
- Statutes at Large: 41 Stat. 456

Codification
- Acts amended: Interstate Commerce Act of 1887, Railway Administration Act of 1918
- Acts repealed: Title III repealed by Railway Labor Act (1926)

Legislative history
- Introduced in the House of Representatives as H.R. 10453 by John J. Esch (R‑WI) on November 8, 1919; Committee consideration by House Committee on Interstate and Foreign Commerce; Passed the House of Representatives on November 17, 1919 (203–115); Passed the Senate on December 20, 1919 (46–30); Reported by the joint conference committee on December 22, 1919 – February 18, 1920; agreed to by the House of Representatives on February 21, 1920 (250–150) and by the Senate on February 23, 1920 (47–17); Signed into law by President Woodrow Wilson on February 28, 1920

United States Supreme Court cases
- Railroad Commission of Wisconsin v. Chicago, Burlington & Quincy Railroad Co. (1922), Dayton-Goose Creek Railway Co. v. United States (1924)

The Transportation Act, 1920, commonly known as the Esch–Cummins Act, was a United States federal law that returned railroads to private operation after World War I, with much regulation. It also officially encouraged private consolidation of railroads and mandated that the Interstate Commerce Commission (ICC) ensure their profitability. The act was named after Rep. John J. Esch and Sen. Albert B. Cummins.

== Background ==
The United States had entered World War I in April 1917, and the government found that the nation's railroads were not prepared to serve the war effort. On December 26, 1917, President Woodrow Wilson had ordered that U.S. railroads be nationalized in the public interest. This order was implemented through the creation of the United States Railroad Administration. Congress ratified the order in the Railway Administration Act of 1918.

== Major provisions ==
- Terminated federal control of railroads from March 1, 1920.
- Authorized the government to make settlements with railroad carriers for matters caused by nationalization, such as compensation and other expenses.
- Directed the ICC to prepare and adopt a plan for the consolidation of the railway properties of the United States into a limited number of systems. See Ripley Plan to consolidate railroads into regional systems.
- Granted authority to the ICC to set minimum shipping rates, oversee railroads' financial operations, and regulate acquisitions and mergers.
- Established procedures for settling labor disputes between railroads and employees. A Railroad Labor Board was created to regulate wages and settle disputes.

== Subsequent legislation ==
Title III of the Esch–Cummins Act, which pertained to labor disputes, was repealed in 1926 by the Railway Labor Act.

== See also ==
- Interstate Commerce Act of 1887
- Elkins Act of 1903
- Mann-Elkins Act of 1910
- Railway Labor Act of 1926
- History of rail transport in the United States
