= Bureau of Corporations =

Investigative agency in the US Commerce and Labor Department

Agency overview
- Formed: February 14, 1903
- Dissolved: 1915
- Superseding agency: Federal Trade Commission
- Jurisdiction: Federal government of the United States
- Headquarters: Washington, D.C.
- Agency executive: Joseph E. Davies, Commissioner of Corporations
- Parent department: Department of Commerce and Labor
- Key documents: Hepburn Act (1906); Federal Water Power Act of 1920 (Esch Act); Public Utility Holding Company Act of 1935

The Bureau of Corporations, predecessor to the Federal Trade Commission, was created as an investigatory agency within the Department of Commerce and Labor in the United States.

== Background ==
After being sought by President Theodore Roosevelt, Congress passed a law creating the Bureau and the Department on February 14, 1903, and Roosevelt considered the Bureau's creation one of his greatest achievements.

The main role of the Bureau was to study and report on industry, looking especially for monopolistic practices. Its 1906 report on petroleum transportation made recommendations that became part of the Hepburn Act of 1906, and was used when the Justice Department successfully prosecuted and broke up Standard Oil in 1911.

In 1912 the Bureau issued a report on the development of water power in the United States, including its ownership or control, and fundamental economic principles involved in utilization of this new and rapidly growing energy source. The report noted an increasing concentration of ownership and control of widely separated waterpower developments in the hands of a few; a substantial interrelationship among leading water-power interests, as well as a significant and increasing affiliation between water-power companies and street-railway and electric-lighting companies. The report stressed the importance of promptly adopting a definitive public policy concerning water-power development. The various concerns expressed would initially be regulated by the Federal Water Power Act of 1920. The business, managerial, and financial practices of these early utility holding companies would proliferate, but remain largely unregulated until the Public Utility Holding Company Act of 1935.

Congress ordered the Bureau to investigate the meatpacking industry, specifically "the unusually large margins between the price of beef cattle and the selling prices of fresh beef, and whether the said conditions have resulted in whole or in part from any contract, combination, in the form of trust or otherwise, or conspiracy, in restraint of commerce". The Bureau also conducted studies of tobacco, steel, lumber and other industries.

== Merger ==
The Bureau became part of the new Federal Trade Commission in 1915. The new Commission took over both staff and ongoing investigations from the Bureau. Commissioner of Corporations, Joseph E. Davies, became the FTC's first Chairman and Davies' deputy Francis Walker became the chief economist of the FTC.
