= Staggers Rail Act =

1980 U.S. railroad deregulation bill

- Long title: A bill to reform the economic regulation of railroads, and for other purposes.
- Enacted by: the 96th United States Congress
- Effective: October 14, 1980

Citations
- Public law: Pub. L. 96–448

Legislative history
- Introduced in the Senate as "Harley O. Staggers Rail Act of 1980" (S. 1946) by Howard Cannon (D-NV) on October 29, 1979; Committee consideration by Senate Commerce, Science, and Transportation; Passed the Senate on April 1, 1980 (91-4); Passed the House on September 9, 1980 (337-20); Reported by the joint conference committee on September 29, 1980; agreed to by the Senate on September 30, 1980 (66-2) and by the House on September 30, 1980; Signed into law by President Jimmy Carter on October 14, 1980

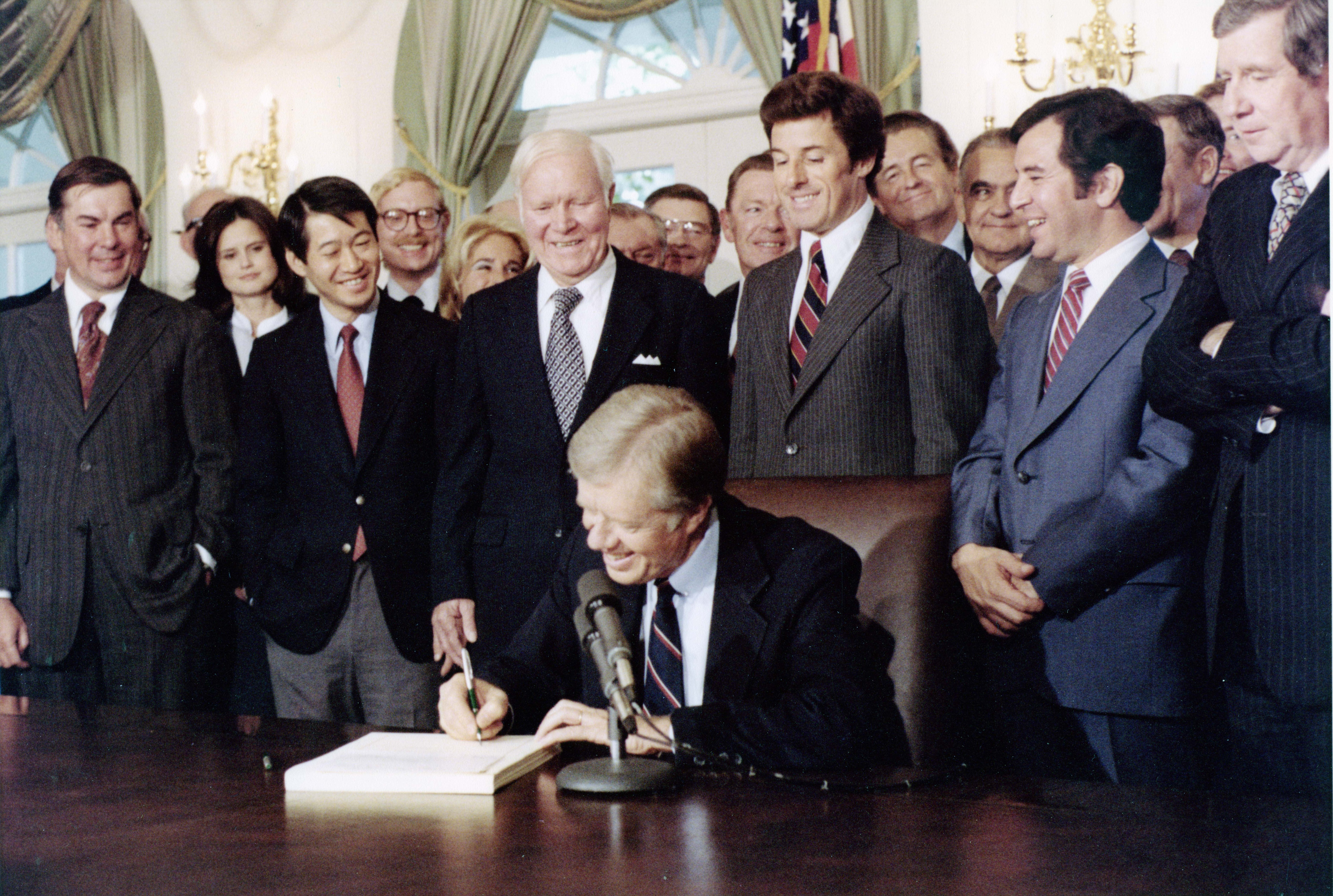
President Jimmy Carter signs the Staggers Rail Act into law on October 14, 1980. Representative Harley O. Staggers, sponsor of the bill, stands to the president's right.

The Staggers Rail Act of 1980 is a United States federal law that deregulated the American railroad industry to a significant extent, and it replaced the regulatory structure that had existed since the Interstate Commerce Act of 1887.

== Background ==
After the Great Depression and World War II, many railroads were driven out of business by competition from government-funded interstate highways and from airlines that relied on public airports and government air traffic control. Cars and trucks, running on government-built roads, all but ended passenger train service and severely reduced railroads' cargo revenues. Railroads continued to be regulated by the Interstate Commerce Commission (ICC) and a complex system for setting shipping rates.

The Staggers Act followed the Railroad Revitalization and Regulatory Reform Act of 1976 (often called the "4R Act"), which reduced federal regulation of railroads and authorized implementation details for Conrail, the new northeastern railroad system. The 4R reforms included allowance of a greater range for railroad pricing without close regulatory restraint, greater independence from collective rate making procedures in rail pricing and service offers, contract rates, and, to a lesser extent, greater freedom for entry into and exit from rail markets.

Although the 4R Act established the guidelines, the ICC at first, did not give much effect to its legislative mandates. As regulatory change began to appear from 1976 to 1979, including the phasing out of the collective ratemaking authority, most major railroads shifted away from their effort to maintain the historic regulatory system and came to support greater freedom for rail pricing, for higher and lower rail rates.

Major railroad shippers also continued to believe that they would be better served by more flexibility to arrive at tailored arrangements that were mutually beneficial to a particular shipper, and to the carrier serving a particular shipper. The judgments supported a second round of legislation.

== Summary ==
The major regulatory changes of the Staggers Act were:

- A rail carrier could establish any rate for a rail service unless the ICC were to determine that there was no effective competition for rail services.
- Rail shippers and rail carriers would be allowed to establish contracts subject to no effective ICC review unless the Commission determined that the contract service would interfere with the rail carrier's ability to provide common carrier service (a finding rarely made that is not apparent in the history of the rail industry thereafter).
- The scope of authority to control rates to prevent "discrimination" among shippers was substantially curtailed.
- Across-the-board industry-wide rate increases were phased out.
- The dismantling of the collective rate making machinery among railroads begun in 1976 was reaffirmed, with railroads not allowed to agree to rates they could perform on their own systems and were not allowed to participate in the determination of the rates on traffic in which they did not effectively participate.

The Act also had provisions allowing the Commission to require access by one railroad to another railroad's facilities if one railroad had effective "bottleneck" control of traffic. The provisions dealt with "reciprocal switching" (handling of railroad cars between long-haul rail carriers and local customers) and trackage rights. However, the provisions did not have as much effect as the others mentioned.

The act was named for Harley Staggers (D-WV), who chaired the House Committee on Energy and Commerce.

== Impact ==
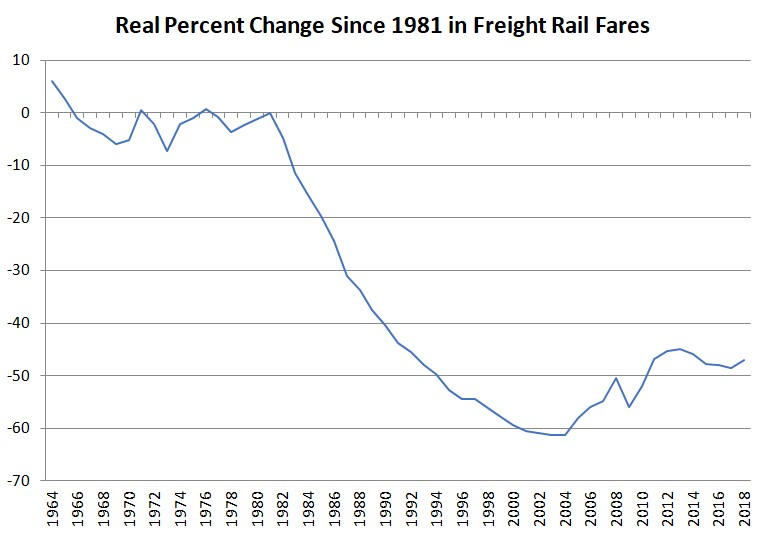
Percent change in freight rail fares since Staggers Act deregulation.

By 1997, studies of the rail industry showed dramatic benefits for both railroads and their users from the alteration to the regulatory system. According to studies by the Department of Transportation's Freight Management and Operations, railroad industry costs and prices were halved over a ten-year period, the railroads reversed their historic loss of traffic (as measured by ton-miles) to the trucking industry, and railroad industry profits began to recover, after decades of low profits and widespread railroad insolvencies. In 2007, the Government Accountability Office reported to Congress, "The railroad industry is increasingly healthy and rail rates have generally declined since 1985, despite recent rate increases.... There is widespread consensus that the freight rail industry has benefited from the Staggers Rail Act."

The Association of American Railroads, the principal railroad industry trade association, stated that the Staggers Act has led to a 51 percent reduction in average shipping rates, and $480 billion has been reinvested by the industry into their rail systems.

== Related deregulatory legislation ==
The Staggers Act was one of three major deregulation laws passed by Congress in a two-year period, as the cumulative result of efforts to reform transport regulation begun in 1971, during the Nixon administration. The other two laws were the Airline Deregulation Act of 1978 and the Motor Carrier Act of 1980. This legislation in effect superseded almost a century of detailed regulation begun with the establishment of the ICC in 1887. The Interstate Commerce Commission Termination Act of 1995 abolished the ICC and created its successor agency, the Surface Transportation Board, an administrative affiliate of the United States Department of Transportation.

== See also ==
- History of rail transport in the United States
