= Interstate Commerce Act of 1887 =

United States federal law

- Long title: An act to regulate commerce
- Enacted by: the 49th United States Congress
- Effective: April 7, 1887

Citations
- Public law: Pub. L. 49–104
- Statutes at Large: 24 Stat. 379

Legislative history
- Passed the U.S. House on February 4, 1887; Passed the U.S. Senate on February 4, 1887

Major amendments
- Elkins Act; Hepburn Act; Mann–Elkins Act; Valuation Act; Motor Carrier Act of 1935; Railroad Revitalization and Regulatory Reform Act; Staggers Rail Act; Motor Carrier Act of 1980

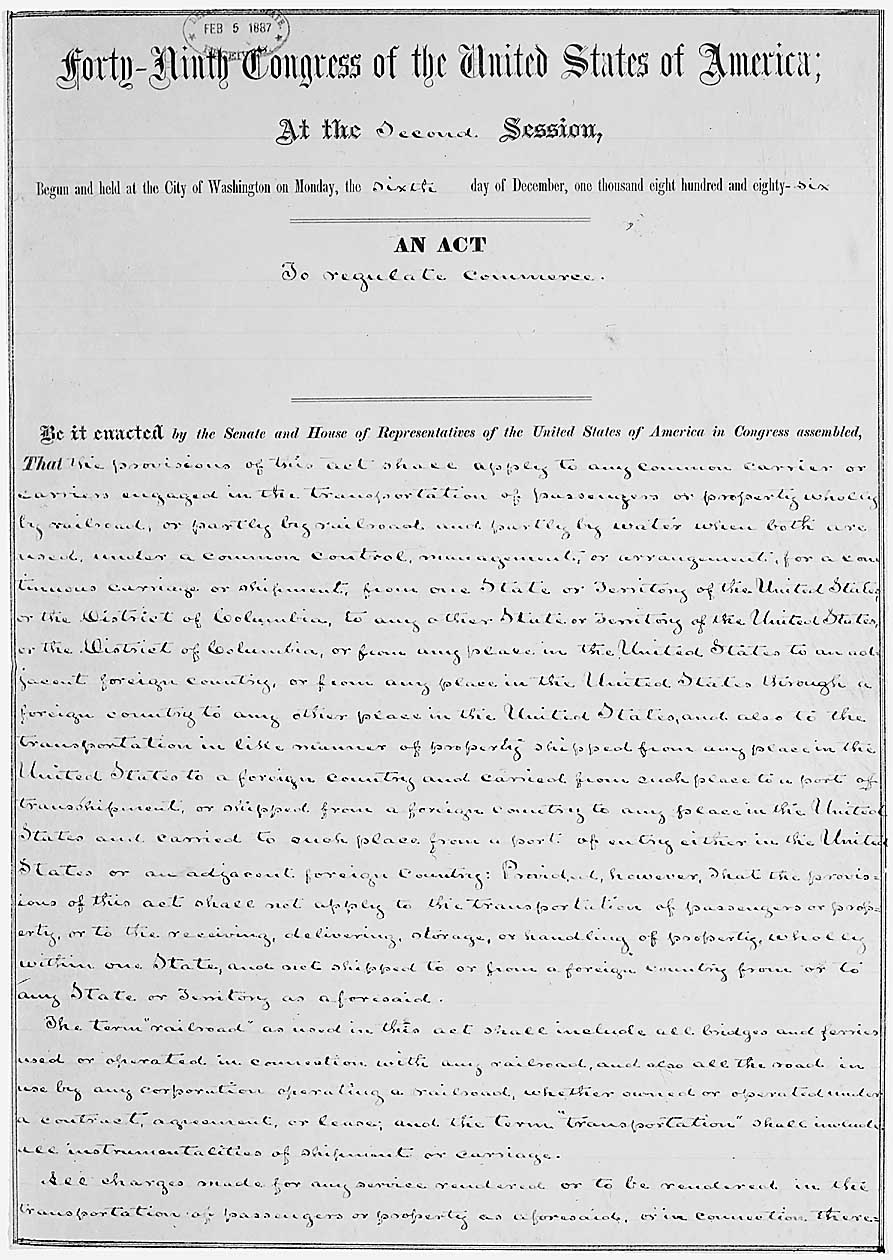
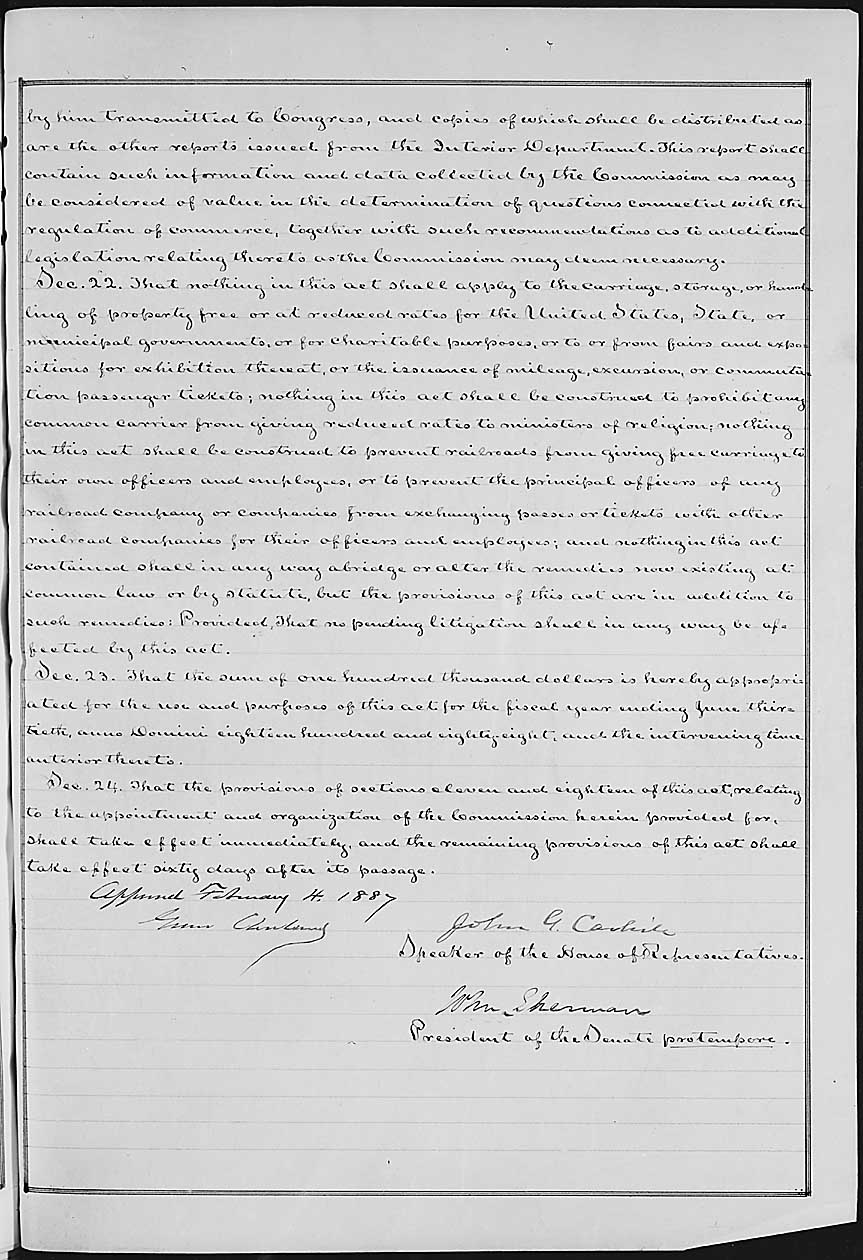
Act of February 4, 1887 (Interstate Commerce Act)

The Interstate Commerce Act of 1887 is a United States federal law that was designed to regulate the railroad industry, particularly its monopolistic practices. The Act required that railroad rates be "reasonable and just", but did not empower the government to fix specific rates. It also required that railroads publicize shipping rates and prohibited short haul or long haul fare discrimination, a form of price discrimination against smaller markets, particularly farmers in Western or Southern Territory compared to the official Eastern states. The Act created a federal regulatory agency, the Interstate Commerce Commission (ICC), which it charged with monitoring railroads to ensure that they complied with the new regulations.

With the passage of the Act, the railroad industry became the first industry subject to federal regulation by a regulatory body. It was later amended to regulate other modes of transportation and commerce.

== Background of the act ==
The act was passed in response to rising public concern with the growing power and wealth of corporations, particularly railroads, during the late nineteenth century. Railroads had become the principal form of transportation for both people and goods, and the prices they charged and the practices they adopted greatly influenced individuals and businesses. In some cases, the railroads were perceived to have abused their power as a result of too little competition. Railroads also banded together to form pools and trusts that fixed rates at higher levels than they could otherwise command.

Responding to a widespread public outcry, states passed numerous pieces of legislation. Through the 1870s various constituencies, notably the Grange movement representing farmers, lobbied Congress to regulate railroads. While the Senate would investigate and report its findings and recommendations in 1874, Congress declined to step in, mirroring the lack of consensus in approach. In the 1886 decision on Wabash, St. Louis & Pacific Railway Company v. Illinois however, the U.S. Supreme Court ruled that state laws regulating interstate railroads were unconstitutional because they violated the Commerce Clause of the Constitution, which gives Congress the exclusive power "to regulate Commerce with foreign nations, and among the several States, and with the Indian Tribes." With many of those questions of approach decided, Congress passed the Interstate Commerce Act the following year; it was signed into law by President Grover Cleveland on February 4, 1887.

The act worked to keep rates and railroad revenue up on routes where competition existed. It did this by attempting to force publicity about rates and make rebates and discrimination illegal. ('Discrimination' meant lower rates for certain customers, e.g. politicians, large customers, sharp bargainers, long haul shippers, shippers in competitive markets, low season travelers.) Railroads saw that competition made it hard to pay their stockholders and bondholders the amount of money promised to them, and competition was therefore "bad."

== Jurisdiction of the act ==
The act also created the Interstate Commerce Commission (ICC), the first independent regulatory agency of the US government. As part of its mission, the ICC heard complaints against the railroads and issued cease and desist orders to combat unfair practices. While the ICC was empowered to investigate and prosecute railroads and other transportation companies that were alleged to have violated the act, its jurisdiction was limited to companies that operated across state lines. Over time the courts would further narrow the agency's authority, and in 1903 Congress established the Department of Commerce and Labor and its Bureau of Corporations to study and report on wider industries and their monopolistic practices. By 1906, the Supreme Court had ruled in favor of a railroad company in fifteen out of the sixteen cases over which it presided.

== Amendments ==
=== Early twentieth century ===
Congress passed a minor amendment to the Act in 1903, the Elkins Act. Major amendments were enacted in 1906 and 1910. The Hepburn Act of 1906 authorized the ICC to set maximum railroad rates, and extended the agency's authority to cover bridges, terminals, ferries, sleeping cars, express companies and oil pipelines. The Mann-Elkins Act of 1910 strengthened ICC authority over railroad rates and expanded its jurisdiction to include regulation of telephone, telegraph, and cable companies. The Valuation Act of 1913 required the ICC to organize a Bureau of Valuation that would assess the value of railroad property. This information would be used to set freight shipping rates.

=== Motor Carrier Act of 1935 ===
In 1935, Congress passed the Motor Carrier Act, which amended the Interstate Commerce Act to regulate bus lines and trucking as common carriers.

=== Later amendments ===
Congress enacted simplifying and reorganizing amendments in 1978, 1983 and 1994.

=== Deregulation ===
Congress passed various railroad deregulation measures in the 1970s and 1980s. The Railroad Revitalization and Regulatory Reform Act of 1976 (often called the "4R Act") gave railroads more flexibility in pricing and service arrangements. The 4R Act also transferred some powers from the ICC to the newly formed United States Railway Association, a government corporation, regarding the disposition of bankrupt railroads. The Staggers Rail Act of 1980 further reduced ICC authority by allowing railroads to set rates more freely and become more competitive with the trucking industry.

The Motor Carrier Act of 1980 deregulated the trucking industry.

=== Abolition ===
Congress abolished the ICC in 1995 (see Interstate Commerce Commission Termination Act) and many of its remaining functions were transferred to a new agency, the Surface Transportation Board.

== See also ==
- History of rail transport in the United States
