= Samuel Calvin Tate Dodd =

American lawyer (1836–1907)

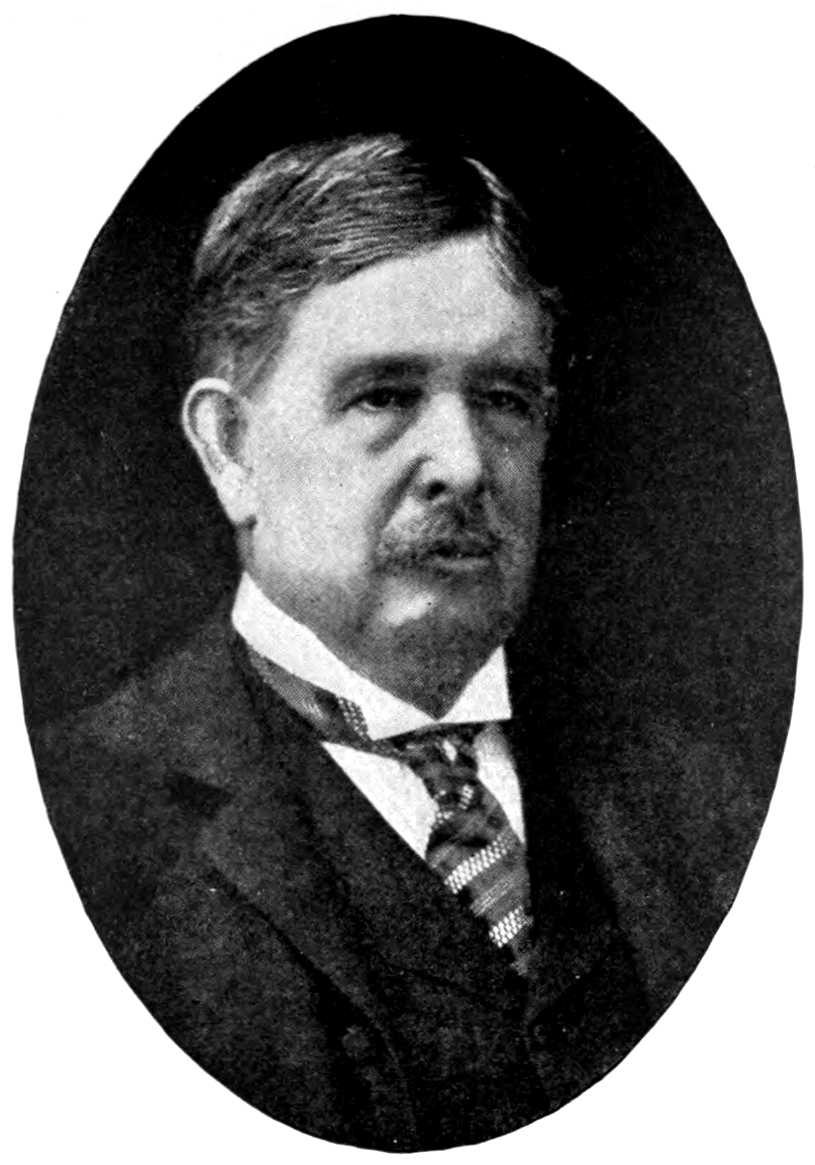
- Born: February 20, 1836; Franklin, Pennsylvania, U.S.
- Died: 1907 (aged 70–71)

Samuel Calvin Tate Dodd (February 20, 1836 – 1907) was an American lawyer notable for his work for John D. Rockefeller. Dodd created the business trust arrangement that enabled Rockefeller's control of many oil companies, and he organized Standard Oil, one of the earliest large holding companies. Dodd was an opponent of the Sherman Antitrust Act and argued that only "unreasonable" restraints of trade should be illegal; this view was adopted (after Dodd's death) by the United States Supreme Court in Standard Oil Co. of New Jersey v. United States (though the court found Standard Oil's behavior to be unreasonable and ordered the company's break-up).
