= United States Department of Commerce and Labor =

Executive government department (1903–1913)

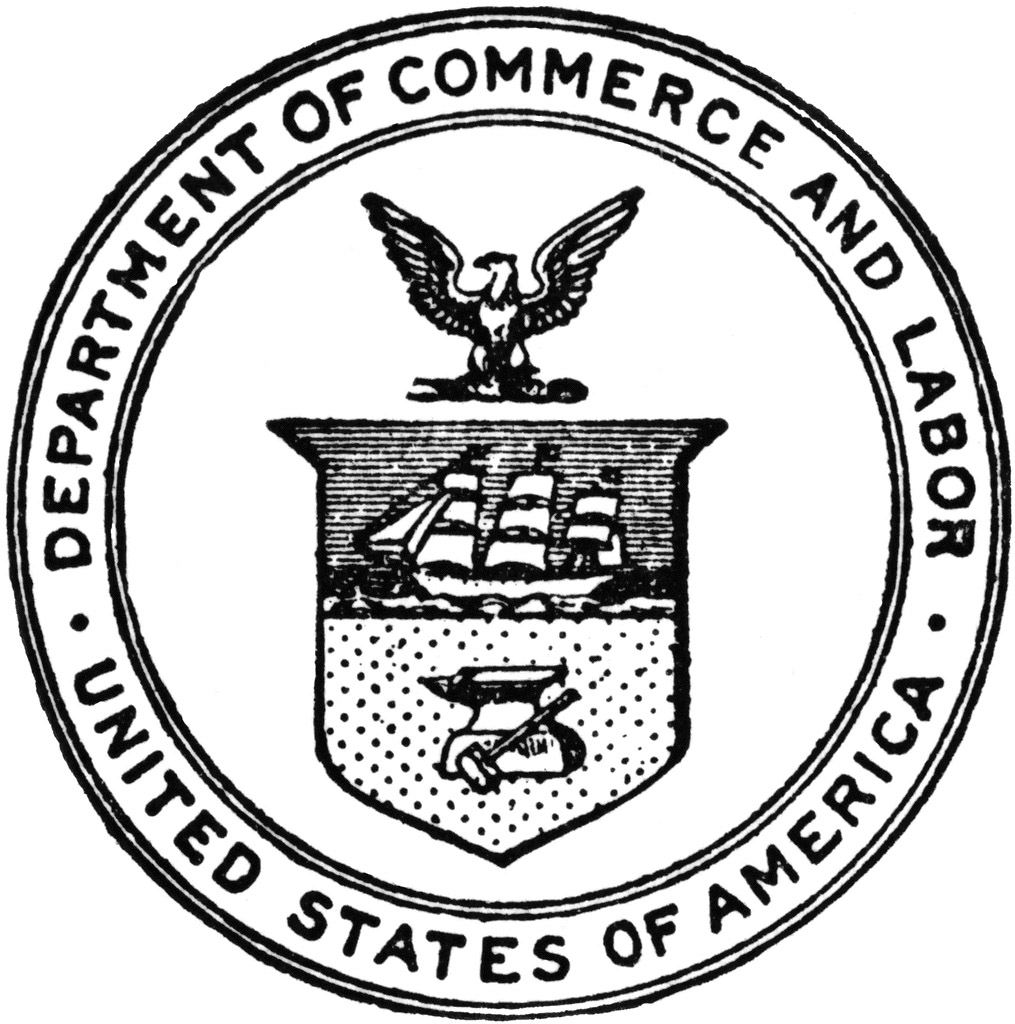
- Seal of the U.S. Department of Commerce and Labor

Agency overview
- Formed: February 14, 1903; 123 years ago
- Preceding agency: none
- Dissolved: March 4, 1913; 113 years ago
- Superseding agencies: United States Department of Commerce; United States Department of Labor
- Jurisdiction: United States
- Headquarters: Washington, D.C.
- Employees: 10,125 (July 1, 1903)
- Agency executive: Secretary; Assistant Secretary

Secretary of Commerce and Labor of the United States of America
- United States Department of Commerce and Labor
- Style: Mr. Secretary
- Member of: Cabinet
- Reports to: The president
- Seat: Washington, D.C.
- Appointer: The president; with Senate advice and consent
- Term length: No fixed term
- Formation: February 14, 1903; 123 years ago
- First holder: George B. Cortelyou
- Final holder: Charles Nagel
- Abolished: March 4, 1913; 113 years ago
- Succession: Secretary of Commerce; Secretary of Labor

The United States Department of Commerce and Labor was a short-lived Cabinet department of the United States government, which was concerned with fostering and supervising big business. It existed from 1903 to 1913. The United States Department of Commerce is its successor agency, and it also is the predecessor of the United States Department of Labor.

== Origins and establishment ==
Calls in the United States for the creation of an executive department of the United States government devoted to fostering and supervising business and manufacturing can be traced to least as far back as 1787. By the latter decades of the 19th century, the momentum behind the creation of such a department grew, its advocates pointing to the existence of various U.S. agencies to promote and regulate agriculture, fisheries, forestry, labor, mining, and transportation and noting that the United States was virtually alone among the countries of the world in lacking a government agency to perform the same function for commerce and industry.

In the first session of the 57th United States Congress (1901–1903), a bill was introduced in the United States Senate to address this shortcoming by establishing the Department of Commerce and Labor. It passed the Senate with little or no opposition, and during the second session of the 57th Congress passed the United States House of Representatives as well. President Theodore Roosevelt signed the bill into law on February 14, 1903, creating the department. The department was given "the province and duty to ... foster, promote, and develop the foreign and domestic commerce, the mining, manufacturing, shipping, and fishing industries, the labor interests, and the transportation facilities of the United States."

The United States Secretary of Commerce and Labor was the head of the department and a member of the United States Cabinet, and an Assistant Secretary of Commerce and Labor served under the secretary. On February 16, 1903, President Roosevelt appointed his personal secretary, George B. Cortelyou, as the first secretary of commerce and labor. He was confirmed by the U.S. Senate the same day and established a temporary headquarters at the White House in Washington, D.C., on February 18, 1903. After the department moved into another temporary headquarters in downtown Washington, D.C., it began operations on March 16, 1903. It opened its permanent headquarters in Washington, D.C., on June 17, 1903.

The department's subordinate agencies were placed under its control on July 1, 1903. In remarks for the occasion, Secretary Cortelyou noted that the subordination of agencies to the Department of Commerce and Labor on that day had given the department a total workforce of 10,125 people.

== Subordinate agencies ==
On July 1, 1903, the Department of Commerce and Labor took control of 13 subordinate agencies, making the department one of the largest and most complicated in the U.S. Government. Although the youngest executive department, it took the responsibility for the oversight of some of the oldest U.S. Government agencies and programs. Nine of its subordinate agencies were transferred from other executive departments, two previously were independent agencies, and two were new agencies established as of that date:

- The United States Lighthouse Board, established in 1852 and responsible for lighthouses and other aids to navigation, was transferred from the United States Department of the Treasury. The transfer included the Lighthouse Establishment, established in 1791 and overseen by the Lighthouse Board.
- The Bureau of the Census, established in 1902 and responsible for the decennial United States census and for producing data on the American people and economy, was transferred from the United States Department of the Interior.
- The United States Coast and Geodetic Survey, established in 1807, known as the Survey of the Coast from 1807 to 1836 and as the United States Coast Survey from 1836 to 1878 and responsible for hydrographic surveys of coastal waters, hydrography, oceanography, geology, geophysics, geodesy, topography, meteorology, astronomy, cartography, navigation, pilotage, and the study of tides, was transferred from the Department of the Treasury.
- The Bureau of Statistics (an ancestor of the Bureau of Economic Analysis), established in 1866, transferred from the Department of the Treasury. The Bureau of Statistics was responsible for collecting and publishing statistics on domestic and foreign commerce.
- The Bureau of Foreign Commerce, established in 1842 and known as the Bureau of Statistics, State Department, from 1874 to 1897, transferred from the United States Department of State. The Bureau of Foreign Commerce and its responsibility for gathering and publishing statistics on foreign commerce were consolidated with and merged into the Department of Commerce and Labor's Bureau of Statistics upon transfer, and the Bureau of Foreign Commerce lost its distinct identity.
- The National Bureau of Standards, established in 1830 as the Office of Weights and Measures and known as that until 1901, responsible for standardizing weights and measures in the United States, transferred from the Department of the Treasury.
- The Steamboat Inspection Service, established in 1871 and responsible for the safety of lives and property at sea, transferred from the Department of the Treasury.
- The United States Commission of Fish and Fisheries, a previously independent agency established in 1871 and widely referred to as the United States Fish Commission, responsible for promoting, preserving, and investigating the fisheries of the United States. Upon its transfer to the Department of Commerce and Labor, it was reorganized and renamed the United States Bureau of Fisheries.
- The Department of Labor, established in 1884 and known as the Bureau of Labor until 1888, transferred from the Department of the Interior. Lacking executive status, it was renamed the Bureau of Labor under the Department of Commerce and Labor and given the responsibility for the collection of information on labor hours and earnings and "means of promoting material, social, intellectual, moral prosperity." It was the ancestor of the Bureau of Labor Statistics.
- The Bureau of Navigation, established in 1884 and responsible for enforcing laws related to the construction, equipment, operation, inspection, safety, and documentation of merchant ships, transferred from the Department of the Treasury.
- The Bureau of Immigration (the ancestor of the Immigration and Naturalization Service), established in 1891 as the Office of the Superintendent of Immigration, responsible for applying immigration law, and first referred to as the "Bureau of Immigration" in 1895, transferred from the Department of the Treasury.
- The Bureau of Corporations, a new agency established on July 1, 1903, to investigate the organization, conduct, and management of any corporation, joint stock company, or corporate combination engaged in commerce between U.S. states or with foreign countries, except for common carriers already under the jurisdiction of the Interstate Commerce Commission in accordance with the Interstate Commerce Act of 1887. In essence, the Interstate Commerce Commission had jurisdiction over railroads and the Bureau of Corporations over all other industries engaged in interstate or international commerce.
- The Bureau of Manufactures, a new agency authorized as of July 1, 1903, to foster, promote, and develop the manufacturing industries of the United States and domestic and foreign markets for them, as well as to collect and compile statistics relevant to that duty. The Bureau of Manufactures was not actually established until 1905.

In addition, the jurisdiction, supervision, and control of the fisheries of the District of Alaska, including the harvesting of fur seals and salmon, was transferred from the Department of the Treasury to the Department of Commerce and Labor as of July 1, 1903.

== 1903–1913 ==
Cortelyou served as secretary until June 1904, when he left to manage Theodore Roosevelt's 1904 reelection campaign. California congressman Victor H. Metcalf succeeded him as secretary and described Cortelyou's work in setting up the department during his short tenure as having been "as thorough and complete" as possible. Under Metcalf in 1905, the department established the Bureau of Manufactures, which was the component most directly related to the department's main mission of promoting industry and commerce.

New York businessman and former U.S. Minister to the Ottoman Empire Oscar S. Straus and Missouri politician and lawyer Charles Nagel served as the final two secretaries of commerce and labor. During their tenures, the department increasingly became a focal point for requests for many kinds of scientific, sociological, statistical, and commercial information.

== Dissolution ==
During the decade of the Department of Commerce and Labor′s existence, American manufacturing expanded and American laborers increasingly moved from farming to manufacturing jobs. This trend put increasing pressure on the U.S. Government to separate labor-related functions from the department and give labor its own executive department.

In response, on March 4, 1913, President William Howard Taft on his last day in office signed legislation renaming the department the United States Department of Commerce and transferring its bureaus and agencies specializing in labor to the new United States Department of Labor, which was established on the same date. Corresponding with the division of the department in 1913, the Secretary of Commerce and Labor's position was divided into separate positions of United States Secretary of Commerce and United States Secretary of Labor. The Bureau of Corporations became part of the Department of Commerce in 1913, but was spun off as an independent agency, the Federal Trade Commission, in 1915.

== Later proposals ==
In 2011 and 2013, in response to federal budget-cutting efforts, United States Senator Richard Burr (R-N.C.), sponsored S. 1116, a proposal to re-combine the Department of Commerce and the Department of Labor as the "Department of Commerce and the Workforce." No action on this proposal has been taken beyond referral to committee.

== List of secretaries of commerce and labor ==
Parties

Republican (4)

No.	Portrait	Name	State	Start	End	President
1		George B. Cortelyou (1862–1940)	New York	February 18, 1903	June 30, 1904	Theodore Roosevelt (1901–1909)
2		Victor H. Metcalf (1853–1936)	California	July 1, 1904	December 16, 1906	Theodore Roosevelt (1901–1909)
3		Oscar Straus (1850–1926)	New York	December 17, 1906	March 5, 1909	Theodore Roosevelt (1901–1909)
4		Charles Nagel (1849–1940)	Missouri	March 6, 1909	March 4, 1913	William Howard Taft (1909–1913)

== See also ==
- United States Department of Commerce
- United States Department of Labor
