= Mann–Elkins Act =

US federal law related to railroad rates

- Other short titles: Railway Rate Act of 1910
- Long title: An Act To create a commerce court, and to amend an Act entitled "An Act to regulate commerce," approved February fourth, eighteen hundred and eighty-seven, as heretofore amended, and for other purposes
- Enacted by: the 61st United States Congress
- Effective: June 18, 1910

Citations
- Statutes at Large: 36 Stat. 539

Codification
- Acts amended: Interstate Commerce Act of 1887

Legislative history
- Introduced in the House of Representatives as H.R. 17536 by Charles E. Townsend (R‑MI) on January 10, 1910; Committee consideration by House Committee on Interstate and Foreign Commerce; Passed the House of Representatives on May 10, 1910 (201–126); Passed the Senate on June 3, 1910 (50–12); Reported by the joint conference committee on June 4 – June 14, 1910; agreed to by the House of Representatives on June 14, 1910 (Voice vote) and by the Senate on June 16, 1910 (50–11); Signed into law by President William Howard Taft on June 18, 1910

The Mann–Elkins Act, also called the Railway Rate Act of 1910, was a United States federal law that strengthened the authority of the Interstate Commerce Commission (ICC) over railroad rates. The law also expanded the ICC's jurisdiction to include regulation of telephone, telegraph and wireless companies, and created a commerce court.

== Background ==
President William Howard Taft was concerned about controlling unfair trade practices and competition in the railroad industry. During his 1908 presidential campaign, Taft called for a railroad rate law and policies to boost competition in the rail industry. His administration argued that the Interstate Commerce Act (1887) and the Hepburn Act (1906) were only partially effective in addressing problems that the railroads had imposed upon the national economy. Taft supported amending the Interstate Commerce Act to allow the ICC's initiation of suspending of railroad rate increases (rather than just by responding to complaints). Taft also recommended that railroads should be allowed to arrange rate increases among themselves. (The latter proposal was not adopted in the enacted legislation.)

== Overview ==
The Mann-Elkins Act was a piece of reform legislation developed during the Progressive era. The principal sponsors were Congressmen Stephen Benton Elkins and James Robert Mann. While there had been concern in Congress about the limited effectiveness of the ICC generally, the act was developed in direct response to rate increases that western railroads announced in 1910.

=== Rate setting ===
The 1910 act amended the 1887 and 1906 acts by authorizing the ICC to investigate railroad rate increases, suspending rates where warranted and placing the burden of proof upon the railroad for demonstrating reasonableness. The law mandated that the ICC is "empowered to determine and prescribe what will be the just and reasonable individual or joint rate or rates..." This was the first federal law to authorize setting of maximum rates for a single industry during peacetime. The "long-and-short haul" clause of the 1887 act was strengthened to prohibit railroads from charging passengers more for a short trip, compared to a longer ride, over the same route unless specifically approved by the ICC.

The Act terminated the railroad companies' ability to give free or discounted rates to those who were employees or family of employees.

=== Regulation of additional industries ===
The act extended the authority of the ICC to regulate the telecommunications industry, and designated telephone, telegraph and wireless companies as common carriers.

=== Commerce court ===
The act created the short-lived United States Commerce Court for adjudication of railway disputes. Any appeals from commerce court decisions would go directly to the United States Supreme Court, to increase the efficiency and speed of cases. This disallowed the railroad companies from dragging out long court cases. The Court presided until 1913, when it was abolished by Congress.

== Aftermath ==
Following implementation of the act, railroads had difficulty securing revenue sufficient to keep pace with their rising costs, although the ICC had allowed some rate increases. Investors had overexpanded the nation's trackage, so by late 1915 fully one-sixth of the railroad trackage in the country belonged to roads in receivership (bankruptcy). The national railway investment of 17.5 billion dollars, of which more than half was funded debt, had an estimated worth of sixteen billion dollars. As the United States considered entering World War I, the government identified nationwide inadequacies in terminals, trackage, and rolling stock. In December 1917 the ICC recommended federal control of the railroad industry to ensure efficient operation during wartime. President Woodrow Wilson issued an order for nationalisation of the railroads on December 26, 1917. The United States Railroad Administration was established to manage the railroads during the war, and was abolished in 1920 by the Esch–Cummins Act.

The Mann–Elkins Act paved the way for the Communications Act of 1934. The 1934 law consolidated portions of the Mann-Elkins Act and other laws affecting the telephone and radio industries, to create a unified authority for telecommunications within a new agency, the Federal Communications Commission.

== See also ==
- Elkins Act (1903)
- History of rail transport in the United States
