= Elkins Act =

1903 United States federal law

- Long title: An Act To further regulate commerce with foreign nations and among the States.
- Nicknames: Elkins Act
- Enacted by: the 57th United States Congress
- Effective: February 19, 1903

Citations
- Public law: Pub. L. 57–103
- Statutes at Large: 32 Stat. 847

Codification
- Acts amended: Interstate Commerce Act of 1887

Legislative history
- Introduced in the Senate by Stephen B. Elkins; Signed into law by President Theodore Roosevelt on February 19, 1903

The Elkins Act is a 1903 United States federal law that amended the Interstate Commerce Act of 1887. The Act authorized the Interstate Commerce Commission (ICC) to impose heavy fines on railroads that offered rebates, and upon the shippers that accepted these rebates. The railroad companies were not permitted to offer rebates. Railroad corporations, their officers, and their employees, were all made liable for discriminatory practices.

Prior to the Elkins Act, the livestock and petroleum industries paid standard rail shipping rates, but then would demand that the railroad company give them rebates. The railroad companies resented being extorted by the commercial and industrial trusts and therefore welcomed passage of the Elkins Act. The law was sponsored by President Theodore Roosevelt as a part of his "Square Deal" domestic program, and greatly boosted his popularity.

== Background ==
Congress passed the Elkins Act as an amendment to the Interstate Commerce Act. Without restrictive legislation, large firms could demand rebates or prices below the collusive price from railroad companies as condition for their business. As a result, it was common practice for railroads to offer competitive lower rates for transport between the large cities with high density of firms than the monopolistic rates between less industrial cities, irrespective of length of travel. Trusts constituted such a substantial portion of a carrier's revenue that the trusts could demand rebates as a condition for business, and the carrier would be forced to cooperate.

== Purpose ==
The ICC had been unable to protect competition and fair pricing. Section 2 of the Interstate Commerce Act prohibits a carrier from offering preferential prices or rebates; however, enforcement of this section was ineffective. Powerful trusts would pay the standard shipping price, but demand a rebate from the carrier. Court cases brought before the commission generally did not result in punitive action, as the ICC was composed primarily of railroad interests. Carriers found guilty of price discrimination, moreover, could appeal the ICC decision to federal courts, delaying punishment for years.

The Elkins Act was named for its sponsor, Senator Stephen B. Elkins of West Virginia, who introduced a bill in 1902 at the behest of the Pennsylvania Railroad. The law was passed by the 57th Congress and signed by President Roosevelt on February 19, 1903. The Act made it a misdemeanor for a carrier to impose preferential rebates, and implicated both the carrier and the recipient of the low price. The Act also abolished imprisonment as a punishment for breaching the law, so a violator could only be fined. By reducing the severity of punishment, legislators hoped to encourage firms to testify against each other, and promote stricter enforcement of the law.

== Impact ==
Following the passage of the Elkins Act, real freight rates decreased only slightly. In 1905, leaders in the regulation movement testified before Congress to identify the reduction in prices that resulted from the Act. Yet, in the first months following the passage of the law, the most pronounced change in railroad pricing was the elimination of rebates. However, later analysis has found that decreases in carrier prices are better attributable to decreases in the costs of operation due to technology advances. The elimination of rebates led the railroads to seek other methods to compete for business, leading Governor Albert B. Cummins of Iowa to declare, in 1905, that the elimination of rebates simply forces railroads to seek alternative noncompetitive means to secure business. Thus the act was more effective in stabilizing prices and entrenching price collusion than demonstrably lowering prices.

A diverse group of stakeholders publicly supported the Elkins Act. Citizens who supported the law hoped that reducing price discrimination would lower freight prices uniformly, and railroad interests lobbied for the passage of the Act as a means of enforcing collusive pricing. While the Act restricted preferential pricing, it did not specify what constituted a "reasonable" shipping rate; thus, railroads could use the law to entrench a system of collusive prices. Collusion is unsustainable in a market where it is easy to undercut competitors. However, in industries that only have a small number of competitors (e.g. railroads, airlines, or transportation companies operating between two given cities) collusion is far more likely. The result of the Elkins Act was that railroads had a stronger mechanism to protect their collusive prices and corporate trusts were weakened in their ability to gain shipping discounts. Farmers and other railroad users, instead of benefiting from greater competition, were unaffected by the Act.

While farmers may have benefited from the establishment of a price ceiling on freight rates, the nature of the railroad industry may have not have permitted perfect competition. Economist Robert Harbeson argues that the price wars prior to the Elkins Act suggest that the railroad industry was more oligopolistic. In an industry with decreasing marginal costs and high fixed costs, it would be futile to enforce a price cap. Moreover, he argues, stronger regulation would have prevented carriers from reaching economies of scale.

== Contemporary criticism ==
In reaction to the Elkins Act, it was argued that the law was drafted by Congress on behalf of the railroads, and that while some railroads curtailed rebates for some customers, for others the practice continued unabated. Congress was criticized for enacting only monetary fines for violations of the law and avoiding imposition of criminal penalties.

== Subsequent legislation ==
Citing the shortcomings of the Elkins Act, Progressives began to call for greater regulation of railroad interests, and, in 1906, President Roosevelt signed the Hepburn Act to replace the Elkins Act. The Hepburn Act set maximum freight rates for railroads, representing the greater interests of Americans. The regulations of the Hepburn Act strained railroads, which saw new competition from the rise of trucks and automobiles. The Panic of 1907 was, in part, a result of the turmoil of the railroad industry that resulted from the Hepburn Act.

== See also ==
- History of rail transport in the United States
- Mann-Elkins Act (1910)
