= Hepburn Act =

1906 United States federal law

- Long title: An Act to amend an act entitled "An act to regulate commerce," approved February fourth, eighteen hundred and eighty-seven, and all Acts amendatory thereof, and to enlarge the powers of the Interstate Commerce Commission
- Enacted by: the 59th United States Congress
- Effective: June 29, 1906

Citations
- Public law: Pub. L. 59–337
- Statutes at Large: 34 Stat. 584

Codification
- Acts amended: Interstate Commerce Act of 1887

Legislative history
- Introduced in the House as H.R. 12987; Signed into law by President Theodore Roosevelt on June 29, 1906

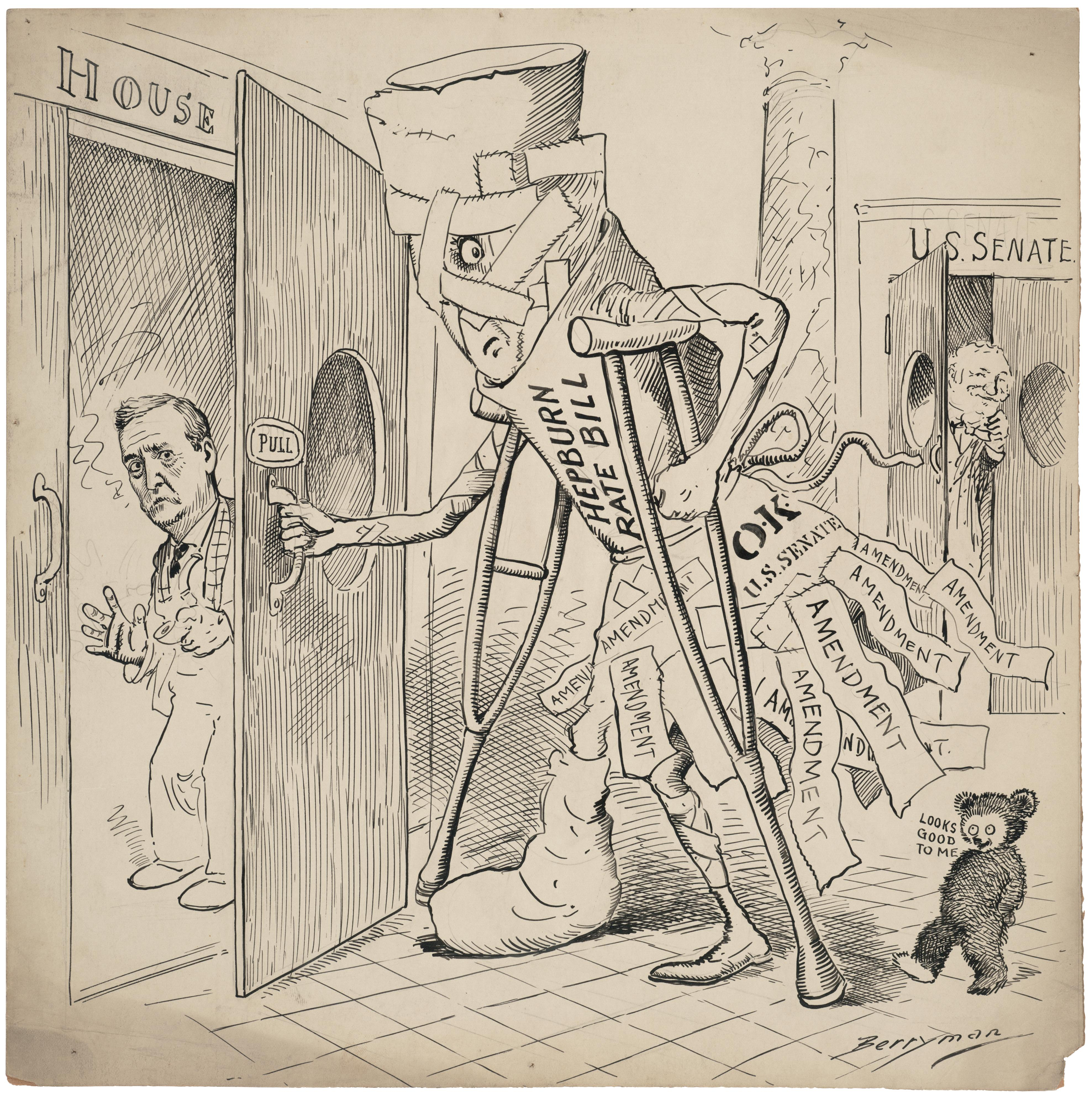
This illustration entitled, "Hepburn Rate Bill", by cartoonist Clifford Berryman, which appeared in the Washington Post on May 15, 1906, depicts the Hepburn Bill, which was strongly endorsed by President Theodore Roosevelt, finally getting past the Senate on its way to the House and showing the beatings it had taken by all of the amendments added in an attempt to block it.

The Hepburn Act is a 1906 United States federal law that expanded the jurisdiction of the Interstate Commerce Commission (ICC) and gave it the power to set maximum railroad rates. This led to the discontinuation of free passes to loyal shippers. In addition, the ICC could view the railroads' financial records, a task simplified by standardized bookkeeping systems. For any railroad that resisted, the ICC's conditions would remain in effect until the outcome of legislation said otherwise. By the Hepburn Act, the ICC's authority was extended to cover bridges, terminals, ferries, railroad sleeping cars, express companies and oil pipelines.

== Background ==
In the President's fifth State of the Union message, Theodore Roosevelt called for the creation of some legislation which would grant powers to control prices of shipping rates. He said:

As I said in my message of December 6 last, the immediate and most pressing need, so far as legislation is concerned, is the enactment into law of some scheme to secure to the agents of the Government such supervision and regulation of the rates charged by the railroads of the country engaged in interstate traffic as shall summarily and effectively prevent the imposition of unjust or unreasonable rates. It must include putting a complete stop to rebates in every shape and form. This power to regulate rates, like all similar powers over the business world, should be exercised with moderation, caution, and self-restraint; but it should exist, so that it can be effectively exercised when the need arises.

The Hepburn Act was named for its sponsor, ten-term Iowa Republican congressman William Peters Hepburn. The final version was close to what President Theodore Roosevelt had asked for a year earlier, and it easily passed Congress with only three dissenting votes. The Act, along with the Elkins Act of 1903, was a component of one of Roosevelt's major policy goals: railroad regulation.

In Interstate Commerce Commission v. Cincinnati, New Orleans & Texas Pacific Railway Co. (1897), the Supreme Court ruled that the Interstate Commerce Act of 1887 did not grant the Interstate Commerce Commission an implied power to set reasonable rail transport rates. This act addressed this issue by explicitly granting such price control power to the agency under a "just-and-reasonable" standard. Railroads were forced to either comply or cease operations. Appeals of district court rulings on this act's application would directly go to the Supreme Court to speed the rate-setting process.

Anti-rebate provisions were toughened, free passes were outlawed, and the penalties for violation were increased. The ICC staff grew from 104 in 1890 to 178 in 1905, 330 in 1907, and 527 in 1909. Finally, the ICC gained the power to prescribe a uniform system of accounting, require standardized reports, and inspect railroad accounts.

The limitation on railroad rates depreciated the value of railroad securities, a factor in causing the Panic of 1907.

In 1914 the Supreme Court ruled that oil pipelines are common carriers subject to the supervision of the ICC.

== Significance ==
Scholars consider the Hepburn Act the most important piece of legislation affecting railroads in the first half of the 20th century. Economists and historians debate whether it crippled the railroads, giving so much advantage to the shippers that a giant unregulated trucking industry—undreamed of in 1906—eventually took away their business.

In Baer Bros. Mercantile Co. v. Denver & Rio Grande Railroad Co., the Supreme Court held that the Hepburn Act treated the Interstate Commerce Commission's authority to award reparations and prescribe future rates as distinct functions. Because reparation orders were quasi-judicial while rate-setting orders were quasi-legislative, the validity of a reparation order did not depend on the Commission simultaneously prescribing a new rate. The Court explained that the Interstate Commerce Commission's reparations and rate-setting powers operated independently. Some complainants, such as municipal organizations, could obtain prospective rate changes but were ineligible for reparations because they had suffered no shipping losses. Conversely, the commission could award reparations for unreasonable past rates without prescribing a new rate where existing rates had become reasonable by the time of the hearing. Commenting on this, Judge Henry Friendly said that the distinction between quasi-judicial reparations and quasi-legislative rate-setting was less clear in practice than the Baer decision suggested.

== Follow-up legislation ==
Congress passed the Mann–Elkins Act in 1910 during the administration of President William Howard Taft, to address limitations in implementation of the Hepburn Act. The Mann–Elkins Act authorized the ICC to initiate reviews of railroad rate increases, rather than simply responding to complaints from shippers. The 1910 law empowered the ICC to set "just and reasonable" maximum rates and placed the burden of proof upon the railroad for demonstrating reasonableness.

== See also ==
- History of rail transport in the United States
- Interstate Commerce Act (1887)
- The Hepburn Committee (1879)
- Louisville & Nashville Railroad Co. v. Mottley (1908)
