= Interstate Commerce Commission =

US federal regulatory agency (1887–1996)

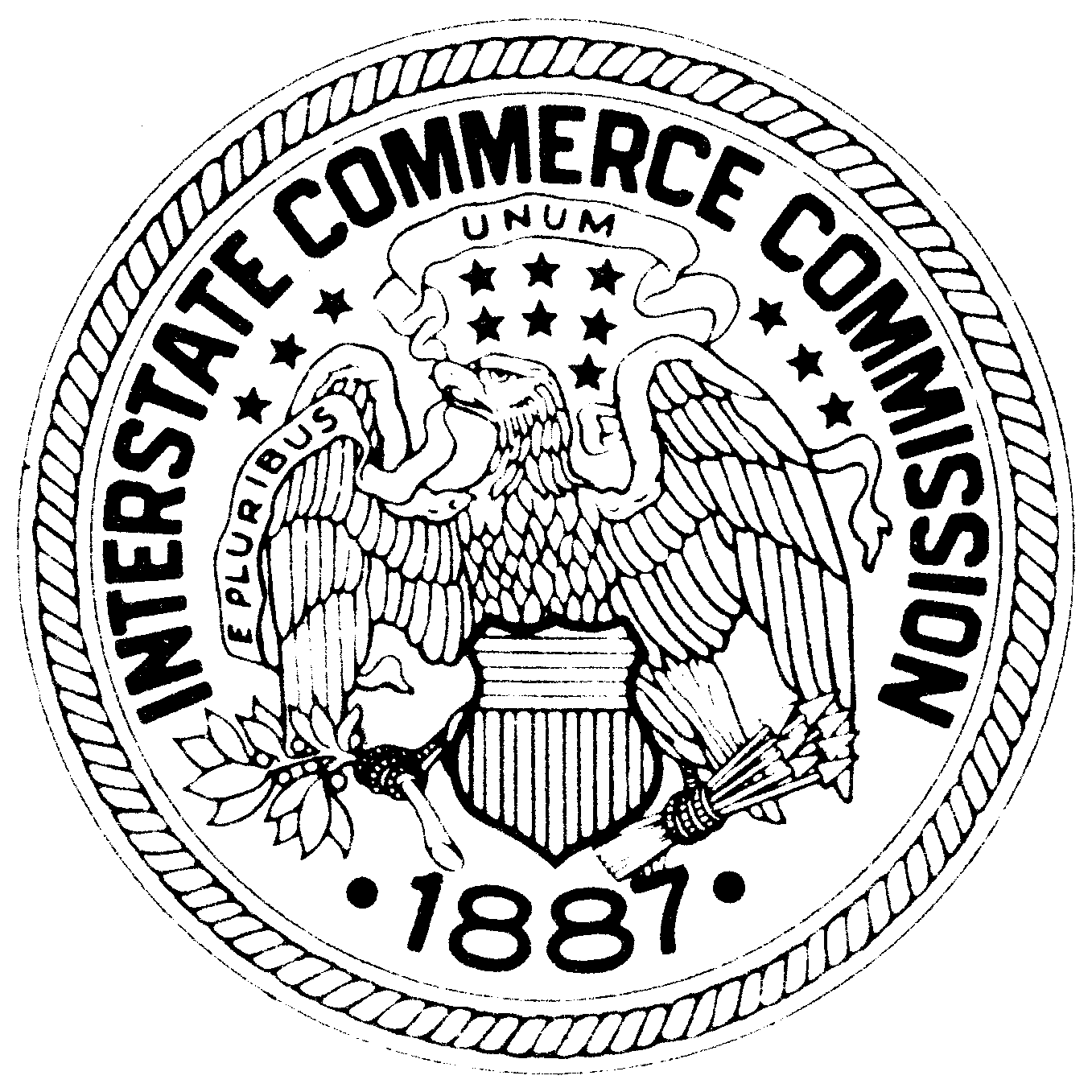
- Seal

Agency overview
- Formed: February 4, 1887
- Dissolved: January 1, 1996
- Superseding agency: Surface Transportation Board
- Jurisdiction: United States
- Key documents: Interstate Commerce Act of 1887; Interstate Commerce Commission Termination Act

The Interstate Commerce Commission (ICC) was a regulatory agency in the United States created by the Interstate Commerce Act of 1887. The agency's original purpose was to regulate railroads (and later trucking) to ensure fair rates, to eliminate rate discrimination, and to regulate other aspects of common carriers, including interstate bus lines and telephone companies. Beginning in 1906, Congress expanded the ICC's authority to regulate other modes of commerce. The Commission's five members were appointed by the president with the consent of the United States Senate. This was the first independent agency (or so-called fourth branch).

Over the course of the latter half of the 20th century, Congress took away many of the ICC's powers and reassigned them to other federal agencies. Congress eventually abolished the ICC in 1995 and transferred its remaining functions to a new agency, the Surface Transportation Board.

== Creation ==
The ICC was established by the Interstate Commerce Act of 1887, which was signed into law by President Grover Cleveland. The creation of the commission was the result of widespread and longstanding anti-railroad agitation. Western farmers, specifically those of the Grange Movement, were the dominant force behind the unrest, but Westerners generally — especially those in rural areas — believed that the railroads possessed economic power that they systematically abused. A central issue was rate discrimination between similarly situated customers and communities. Other potent issues included alleged attempts by railroads to obtain influence over city and state governments and the widespread practice of granting free transportation in the form of yearly passes to opinion leaders (elected officials, newspaper editors, ministers, and so on) so as to dampen any opposition to railroad practices.

Various sections of the Interstate Commerce Act banned "personal discrimination" and required shipping rates to be "just and reasonable."

President Cleveland appointed Thomas M. Cooley as the first chairman of the ICC. Cooley had been Dean of the University of Michigan Law School and Chief Justice of the Michigan Supreme Court.

== Initial implementation and legal challenges ==
The Commission had a troubled start because the law that created it failed to give it adequate enforcement powers.

The Commission is, or can be made, of great use to the railroads. It satisfies the popular clamor for a government supervision of the railroads, while at the same time that supervision is almost entirely nominal.

— Richard Olney, private attorney, in a letter to Charles Elliott Perkins, President of the Chicago, Burlington and Quincy Railroad, December 28, 1892.

Following the passage of the 1887 act, the ICC proceeded to set maximum shipping rates for railroads. However, in the late 1890s, several railroads challenged the agency's ratemaking authority in litigation, and the courts severely limited the ICC's powers.

The ICC became the United States' investigation agency for railroad accidents.

== Expansion of ICC authority ==
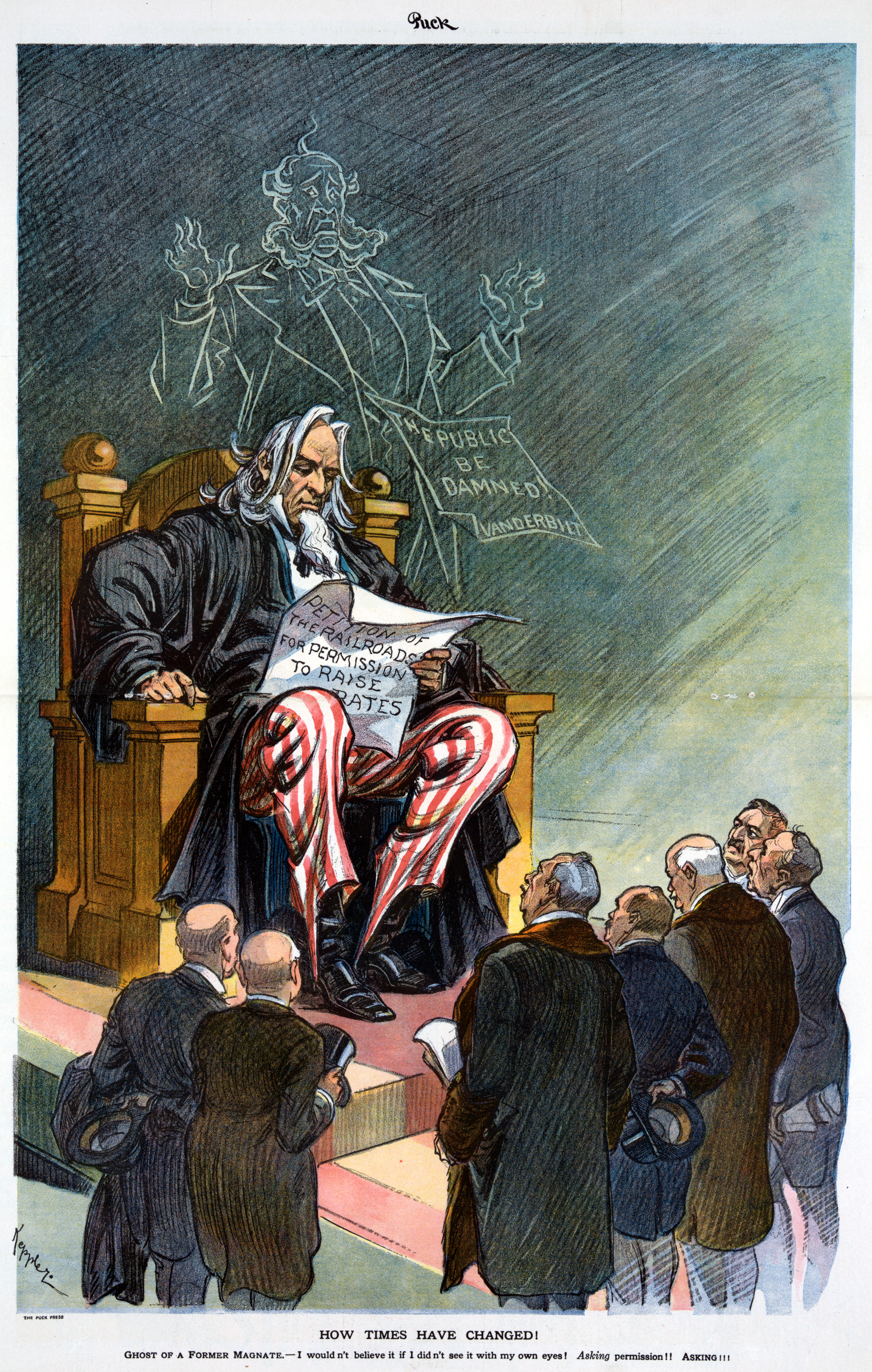
A 1914 cartoon shows railroad companies asking the ICC (depicted as Uncle Sam) for permission to raise rates, while the ghost of a horrified William Henry Vanderbilt looks on.

Congress expanded the commission's powers through subsequent legislation. The 1893 Railroad Safety Appliance Act gave the ICC jurisdiction over railroad safety, removing this authority from the states, and this was followed with amendments in 1903 and 1910. The Hepburn Act of 1906 authorized the ICC to set maximum railroad rates, and extended the agency's authority to cover bridges, terminals, ferries, sleeping cars, express companies and oil pipelines.

A long-standing controversy was how to interpret language in the Act that banned long haul-short haul fare discrimination. The Mann-Elkins Act of 1910 addressed this question by strengthening ICC authority over railroad rates. This amendment also expanded the ICC's jurisdiction to include regulation of telephone, telegraph and wireless companies.

The Valuation Act of 1913 required the ICC to organize a Bureau of Valuation that would assess the value of railroad property. This information would be used to set rates. The Esch-Cummins Act of 1920 expanded the ICC's rate-setting responsibilities, and the agency in turn required updated valuation data from the railroads. The enlarged process led to a major increase in ICC staff, and the valuations continued for almost 20 years. The valuation process turned out to be of limited use in helping the ICC set rates fairly.

In 1934, Congress transferred the telecommunications authority to the new Federal Communications Commission.

In 1935, Congress passed the Motor Carrier Act, which extended ICC authority to regulate interstate bus lines and trucking as common carriers.

== Ripley Plan to consolidate railroads into regional systems ==
The Transportation Act of 1920 directed the Interstate Commerce Commission to prepare and adopt a plan for the consolidation of the railway properties of the United States into a limited number of systems. Between 1920 and 1923, William Z. Ripley, a professor of political economy at Harvard University, wrote up ICC's plan for the regional consolidation of the U.S. railways. His plan became known as the Ripley Plan. In 1929 the ICC published Ripley's Plan under the title Complete Plan of Consolidation. Numerous hearings were held by ICC regarding the plan under the topic "In the Matter of Consolidation of the Railways of the United States into a Limited Number of Systems".

The proposed 21 regional railroads were as follows:

1. Boston and Maine Railroad; Maine Central Railroad; Bangor and Aroostook Railroad; Delaware and Hudson Railway
2. New Haven Railroad; New York, Ontario and Western Railway; Lehigh and Hudson River Railway; Lehigh and New England Railroad
3. New York Central Railroad; Rutland Railroad; Virginian Railway; Chicago, Attica and Southern Railroad
4. Pennsylvania Railroad; Long Island Rail Road
5. Baltimore and Ohio Railroad; Central Railroad of New Jersey; Reading Railroad; Buffalo and Susquehanna Railroad; Buffalo, Rochester and Pittsburgh Railway; 50% of Detroit, Toledo and Ironton Railroad; 50% of Detroit and Toledo Shore Line Railroad; 50% of Monon Railroad; Chicago and Alton Railroad (Alton Railroad)
6. Chesapeake and Ohio-Nickel Plate Road; Hocking Valley Railway; Erie Railroad; Pere Marquette Railway; Delaware, Lackawanna and Western Railroad; Bessemer and Lake Erie Railroad; Chicago and Illinois Midland Railway; 50% of Detroit and Toledo Shore Line Railroad
7. Wabash-Seaboard Air Line Railroad; Lehigh Valley Railroad; Wheeling and Lake Erie Railway; Pittsburgh and West Virginia Railway; Western Maryland Railway; Akron, Canton and Youngstown Railway; Norfolk and Western Railway; 50% of Detroit, Toledo and Ironton Railroad; Toledo, Peoria and Western Railroad; Ann Arbor Railroad; 50% of Winston-Salem Southbound Railway
8. Atlantic Coast Line Railroad; Louisville and Nashville Railroad; Nashville, Chattanooga and St. Louis Railway; Clinchfield Railroad; Atlanta, Birmingham and Coast Railroad; Gulf, Mobile and Northern Railroad; New Orleans, Jackson and Great Northern; 25% of Chicago, Indianapolis and Louisville Railway (Monon Railroad); 50% of Winston-Salem Southbound Railway
9. Southern Railway; Norfolk Southern Railway; Tennessee Central Railway (east of Nashville); Florida East Coast Railway; 25% of Chicago, Indianapolis and Louisville Railway (Monon Railway)
10. Illinois Central Railroad; Central of Georgia Railway; Minneapolis and St. Louis Railway; Tennessee Central Railway (west of Nashville); St. Louis Southwestern Railway (Cotton Belt); Atlanta and St. Andrews Bay Railroad
11. Chicago and North Western Railway; Chicago and Eastern Illinois Railroad; Litchfield and Madison Railway; Mobile and Ohio Railroad; Columbus and Greenville Railway; Lake Superior and Ishpeming Railroad
12. Great Northern-Northern Pacific Railway; Spokane, Portland and Seattle Railway; 50% of Butte, Anaconda and Pacific Railway
13. Milwaukee Road; Escanaba and Lake Superior Railroad; Duluth, Missabe and Northern Railway; Duluth and Iron Range Railroad; 50% of Butte, Anaconda and Pacific Railway; trackage rights on Spokane, Portland and Seattle Railway to Portland, Oregon.
14. Burlington Route; Colorado and Southern Railway; Fort Worth and Denver Railway; Green Bay and Western Railroad; Missouri–Kansas–Texas Railroad; 50% of Trinity and Brazos Valley Railroad; Oklahoma City-Ada-Atoka Railway
15. Union Pacific Railroad; Kansas City Southern Railway
16. Southern Pacific Railroad
17. Santa Fe Railway; Chicago Great Western Railway; Kansas City, Mexico and Orient Railway; Missouri and North Arkansas Railroad; Midland Valley Railroad; Minneapolis, Northfield and Southern Railway
18. Missouri Pacific Railroad; Texas and Pacific Railway; Kansas, Oklahoma and Gulf Railway; Denver and Rio Grande Western Railroad; Denver and Salt Lake Railroad; Western Pacific Railroad; Fort Smith and Western Railway
19. Rock Island-Frisco Railway; Alabama, Tennessee and Northern Railroad; 50% of Trinity and Brazos Valley Railroad; Louisiana and Arkansas Railway; Meridian and Bigbee Railroad
20. Canadian National; Detroit, Grand Haven and Milwaukee Railway; Grand Trunk Western Railroad
21. Canadian Pacific; Soo Line; Duluth, South Shore and Atlantic Railway; Mineral Range Railroad

=== Terminal railroads proposed ===
There were 100 terminal railroads that were also proposed. Below is a sample:

1. Toledo Terminal Railroad; Detroit Terminal Railroad; Kankakee & Seneca Railroad
2. Indianapolis Union Railway; Boston Terminal; Ft. Wayne Union Railway; Norfolk & Portsmouth Belt Line Railroad
3. Toledo, Angola & Western Railway
4. Akron and Barberton Belt Railroad; Canton Railroad; Muskegon Railway & Navigation
5. Philadelphia Belt Line Railroad; Fort Street Union Depot; Detroit Union Railroad Depot & Station; 15 other properties throughout the United States
6. St. Louis & O'Fallon Railway; Detroit & Western Railway; Flint Belt Railroad; 63 other properties throughout the United States
7. Youngstown & Northern Railroad; Delray Connecting Railroad; Wyandotte Southern Railroad; Wyandotte Terminal Railroad; South Brooklyn Railway

=== Plan rejected ===
Many small railroads failed during the Great Depression of the 1930s. Of those lines that survived, the stronger ones were not interested in supporting the weaker ones. Congress repudiated Ripley's Plan with the Transportation Act of 1940, and the consolidation idea was scrapped.

== Racial integration of transport ==
Although racial discrimination was never a major focus of its efforts, the ICC had to address civil rights issues when passengers filed complaints.

=== History ===
- April 28, 1941 - In Mitchell v. United States, the United States Supreme Court ruled that discrimination in which a colored man who had paid a first class fare for an interstate journey was compelled to leave that car and ride in a second class car was essentially unjust, and violated the Interstate Commerce Act. The court thus overturns an ICC order dismissing a complaint against an interstate carrier.
- June 3, 1946 - In Morgan v. Virginia, the Supreme Court invalidates provisions of the Virginia Code which require the separation of white and colored passengers where applied to interstate bus transport. The state law is unconstitutional insofar as it is burdening interstate commerce, an area of federal jurisdiction.
- June 5, 1950 - In Henderson v. United States, the Supreme Court rules to abolish segregation of reserved tables in railroad dining cars. The Southern Railway had reserved tables in such a way as to allocate one table conditionally for blacks and multiple tables for whites; a black passenger traveling first-class was not served in the dining car as the one reserved table was in use. The ICC ruled the discrimination to be an error in judgement on the part of an individual dining car steward; both the United States District Court for the District of Maryland and the Supreme Court disagreed, finding the published policies of the railroad itself to be in violation of the Interstate Commerce Act.
- September 1, 1953 - In Sarah Keys v. Carolina Coach Company, Women's Army Corps private Sarah Keys, represented by civil rights lawyer Dovey Johnson Roundtree, becomes the first black person to challenge the "separate but equal" doctrine in bus segregation before the ICC. While the initial ICC reviewing commissioner declined to accept the case, claiming Brown v. Board of Education (1954) "did not preclude segregation in a private business such as a bus company," Roundtree ultimately prevailed in obtaining a review by the full eleven-person commission.
- November 7, 1955 – ICC bans bus segregation in interstate travel in Sarah Keys v. Carolina Coach Company. This extends the logic of Brown v. Board of Education, a precedent ending the use of "separate but equal" as a defence against discrimination claims in education, to bus travel across state lines.
- December 5, 1960 - In Boynton v. Virginia, the Supreme Court holds that racial segregation in bus terminals is illegal because such segregation violates the Interstate Commerce Act. This ruling, in combination with the ICC's 1955 decision in Keys v. Carolina Coach, effectively outlaws segregation on interstate buses and at the terminals servicing such buses.
- September 23, 1961 - The ICC, at Attorney General Robert F. Kennedy's insistence, issues new rules ending discrimination in interstate travel. Effective November 1, 1961, six years after the commission's own ruling in Keys v. Carolina Coach Company, all interstate buses required to display a certificate that reads: "Seating aboard this vehicle is without regard to race, color, creed, or national origin, by order of the Interstate Commerce Commission."

== Criticism ==
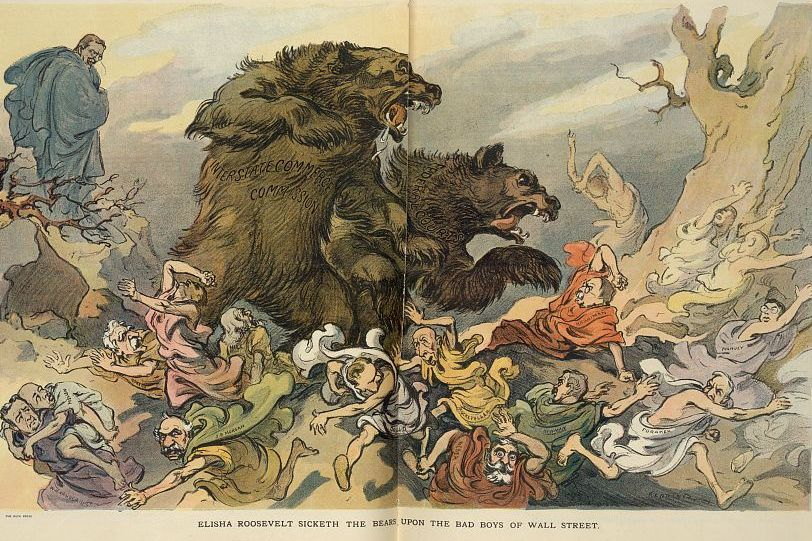
A Puck magazine cartoon from 1907 depicting two large bears named "Interstate Commerce Commission" and "Federal Courts" attacking Wall Street.

The limitation on railroad rates in 1906-07 depreciated the value of railroad securities, a factor in causing the panic of 1907.

Some economists and historians, such as Milton Friedman assert that existing railroad interests took advantage of ICC regulations to strengthen their control of the industry and prevent competition, constituting regulatory capture.

Economist David D. Friedman argues that the ICC always served the railroads as a cartelizing agent and used its authority over other forms of transportation to prevent them, where possible, from undercutting the railroads.

In March 1920, the ICC had Eben Moody Boynton, the inventor of the Boynton Bicycle Railroad, committed as a lunatic to an institution in Washington, D.C. Boynton's monorail electric light rail system, it was reported, had the potential to revolutionize transportation, superseding then-current train travel. ICC officials said that they had Boynton committed because he was "worrying them to death" in his promotion of the bicycle railroad. Based on his own testimony and that of a Massachusetts congressman, Boynton won release on May 28, 1920, overcoming testimony of the ICC's chief clerk that Boynton was virtually a daily visitor at ICC offices, seeking Commission adoption of his proposal to revolutionize the railroad industry.

== Abolition ==
Congress passed various deregulation measures in the 1970s and early 1980s which diminished ICC authority, including the Railroad Revitalization and Regulatory Reform Act of 1976 ("4R Act"), the Motor Carrier Act of 1980 and the Staggers Rail Act of 1980. Senator Fred R. Harris of Oklahoma strongly advocated the abolition of the Commission. In December 1995, when most of the ICC's powers had been eliminated or repealed, Congress finally abolished the agency with the ICC Termination Act of 1995. Final Chair Gail McDonald oversaw transferring its remaining functions to a new agency, the U.S. Surface Transportation Board (STB), which reviews mergers and acquisitions, rail line abandonments and railroad corporate filings.

ICC jurisdiction on rail safety (hours of service rules, equipment and inspection standards) was transferred to the Federal Railroad Administration pursuant to the Federal Railroad Safety Act of 1970.

Before the ICC was abolished motor carriers (bus lines, trucking companies) had safety regulations enforced by the Office of Motor Carriers (OMC) under the Federal Highway Administration (FHWA). The OMC inherited many of the "Economic" regulations enforced by the ICC in addition to the safety regulations imposed on motor carriers. In January 2000 the OMC became the Federal Motor Carrier Safety Administration (FMCSA), within the U.S. Department of Transportation. Prior to its abolition, the ICC gave identification numbers to motor carriers for which it issued licenses. The identification numbers were generally in the form of "ICC MC-000000". When the ICC was dissolved, the function of licensing interstate motor carriers was transferred to FMCSA. All interstate motor carriers that transport freight moving across state lines have a USDOT number, such as "USDOT 000000." USDOT numbers serve as critical infrastructure that enables seamless interstate commerce by standardizing carrier identification, facilitating regulatory oversight, and supporting the coordination of freight movement across state lines. There are private carriers, e.g. Walmart that move their own freight requiring only a USDOT number, and carriers with authority that haul freight for hire that are still required to have a USDOT number and a Motor Carrier (MC) number that replaced the ICC numbers.

== Legacy ==
The ICC served as a model for later regulatory efforts. Unlike, for example, state medical boards (historically administered by the doctors themselves), the seven Interstate Commerce Commissioners and their staffs were full-time regulators who could have no economic ties to the industries they regulated. Since 1887, some state and other federal agencies adopted this structure. And, like the ICC, later agencies tended to be organized as multi-headed independent commissions with staggered terms for the commissioners. At the federal level, agencies patterned after the ICC included the Federal Trade Commission (1914), the Federal Communications Commission (1934), the Securities and Exchange Commission (1934), the National Labor Relations Board (1935), the Civil Aeronautics Board (1940), Postal Regulatory Commission (1970) and the Consumer Product Safety Commission (1975).

In recent decades, this regulatory structure of independent federal agencies has gone out of fashion. The agencies created after the 1970s generally have single heads appointed by the President and are divisions inside executive Cabinet Departments (e.g., the Occupational Safety and Health Administration (1970) or the Transportation Security Administration (2002)). The trend is the same at the state level, though it is probably less pronounced.

=== International influence ===
The Interstate Commerce Commission had a strong influence on the founders of Australia. The Constitution of Australia provides (§§ 101-104; also § 73) for the establishment of an Inter-State Commission, modeled after the United States' Interstate Commerce Commission. However, these provisions have largely not been put into practice; the Commission existed between 1913–1920, and 1975–1989, but never assumed the role which Australia's founders had intended for it.

== See also ==
- Airline deregulation in the United States
- History of rail transport in the United States
- United States administrative law

== Sources ==
- Barnes, Catherine A. (1983). Journey from Jim Crow: The Desegregation of Southern Transit. New York: Columbia University Press. ISBN 978-0-231-05380-8.
- Catsam, Derek Charles (2009). Freedom's Main Line: The Journey of Reconciliation and the Freedom Rides. Lexington, KY: University Press of Kentucky. ISBN 978-0-8131-2511-4.
- Kolko, Gabriel (1965). Railroads and Regulation: 1877-1916. Princeton University Press. ISBN 978-0-8371-8885-0.
- Stone, Richard D. (1991). The Interstate Commerce Commission and the railroad industry: a history of regulatory policy. New York: Praeger. ISBN 978-0-275-93941-0.
- White, Richard (2011). Railroaded: The Transcontinentals and the Making of Modern America. W. W. Norton & Company. ISBN 978-0-393-06126-0.
