= History of the United States (1865–1917) =

The United States of America
- 1865–1917
| History of the United States (1849–1865) | History of the United States (1917–1945) |
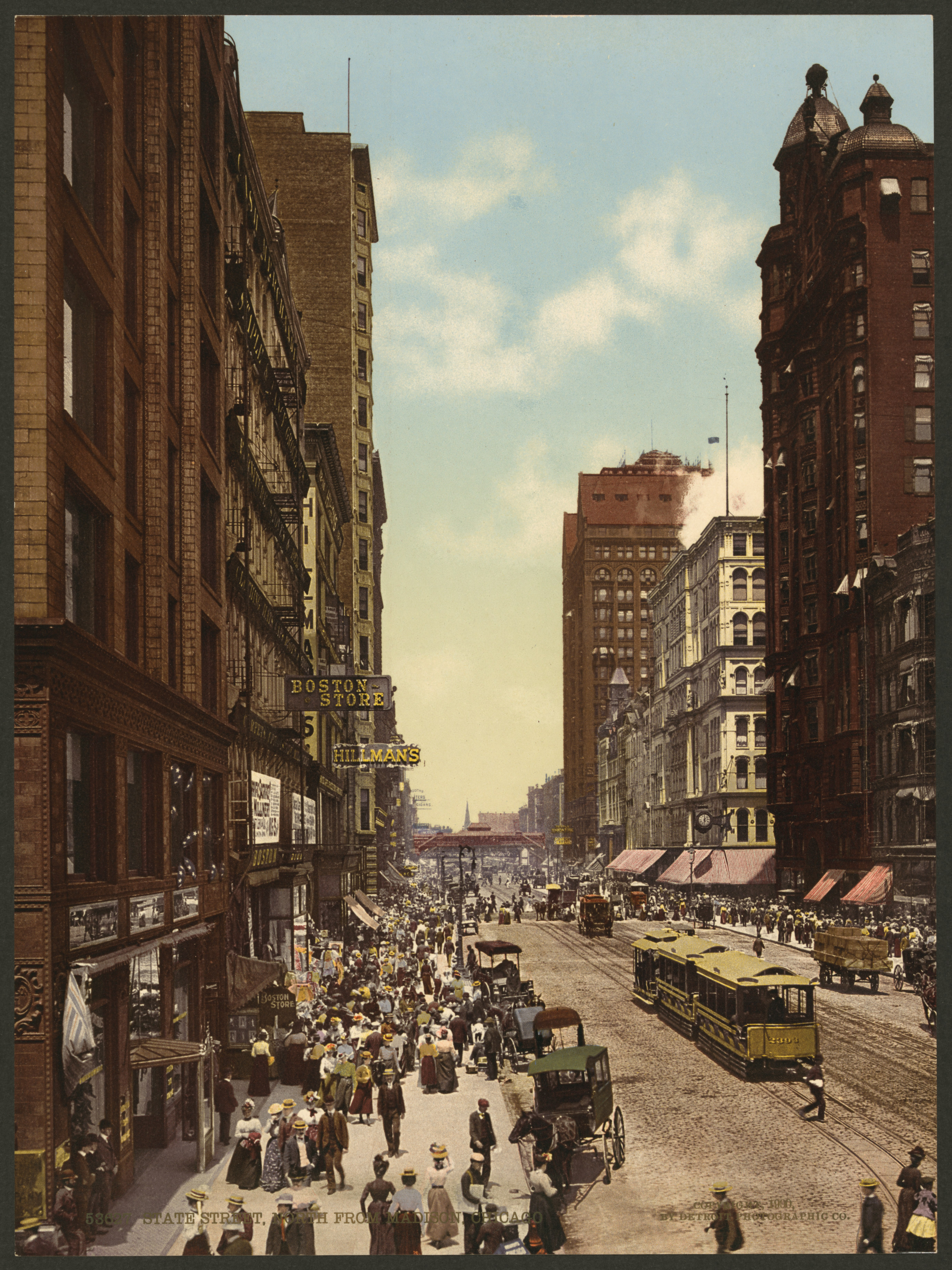
- State Street in Chicago, c. 1900. The post Civil War era saw the rise of the United States as a major industrial economy.
- Location: United States
- Including: Reconstruction era Nadir of American race relations Third Great Awakening; Second Industrial Revolution; Gilded Age; Progressive Era; Migrations: American frontier; Great Migration
- President(s): Abraham Lincoln; Andrew Johnson; Ulysses S. Grant; Rutherford B. Hayes; James A. Garfield; Chester A. Arthur; Grover Cleveland; Benjamin Harrison; William McKinley; Theodore Roosevelt; William Howard Taft; Woodrow Wilson
- Key events: Reconstruction Amendments; Farmers' Movement; First transcontinental railroad Formation of the KKK; Enforcement Acts; Compromise of 1877; Second Industrial Revolution; Assassination of James A. Garfield; American Federation of Labor; Spanish–American War; Philippine–American War; Assassination of William McKinley; Square Deal; Banana Wars; Mexican Border War

The history of the United States from 1865 to 1917 was marked by the Reconstruction era, the Gilded Age, and the Progressive Era, and includes the rise of industrialization and the resulting surge of immigration in the United States.

This period of rapid economic growth and soaring prosperity in the Northern United States and the Western United States saw the U.S. become the world's dominant economic, industrial, and agricultural power. The average annual income (after inflation) of non-farm workers grew by 75% from 1865 to 1900, and then grew another 33% by 1918.

With a victory in 1865 over the Southern Confederate States in the Civil War, the United States became a united nation with a stronger national government. Reconstruction brought the end of legalized slavery plus citizenship for the former slaves, but their new-found political power was rolled back within a decade, and they became second-class citizens under a "Jim Crow" system of deeply pervasive segregation that would stand for the next 80–90 years. Politically, during the Third Party System and Fourth Party System the nation was mostly dominated by Republicans (except for two Democratic presidents). After 1900 and the assassination of President William McKinley, the Progressive Era brought political, business, and social reforms (e.g., new roles for and government expansion of education, higher status for women, a curtailment of corporate excesses, and modernization of many areas of government and society). The Progressives worked through new middle-class organizations to fight against the corruption and behind-the-scenes power of entrenched, state political party organizations and big-city "machines". They demanded—and won—women's right to vote, and the nationwide prohibition of alcohol 1920–1933.

In an unprecedented wave of European immigration, 27.5 million new arrivals between 1865 and 1918 provided the labor base necessary for the expansion of industry and agriculture, as well as the population base for most of fast-growing urban America.

By the late nineteenth century, the United States had become a leading global industrial power, building on new technologies (such as the telegraph and steel), an expanding railroad network, and abundant natural resources such as coal, timber, oil, and farmland, to usher in the Second Industrial Revolution.

It was also during this period that the United States began to emerge as a global superpower. The U.S. easily defeated Spain in 1898, which unexpectedly brought a small empire. Cuba quickly was given independence, and the Philippines eventually became independent in 1946. Puerto Rico (and some smaller islands) became permanent U.S. territories, as did Alaska (added by purchase in 1867). The independent Republic of Hawaii was annexed by the U.S. as a territory in 1898.

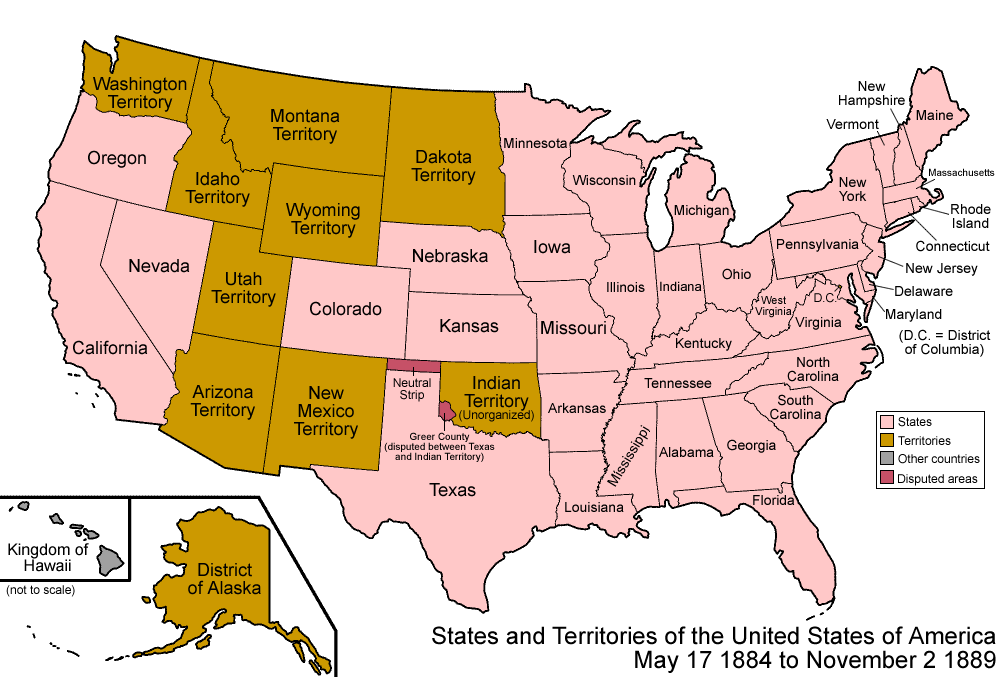

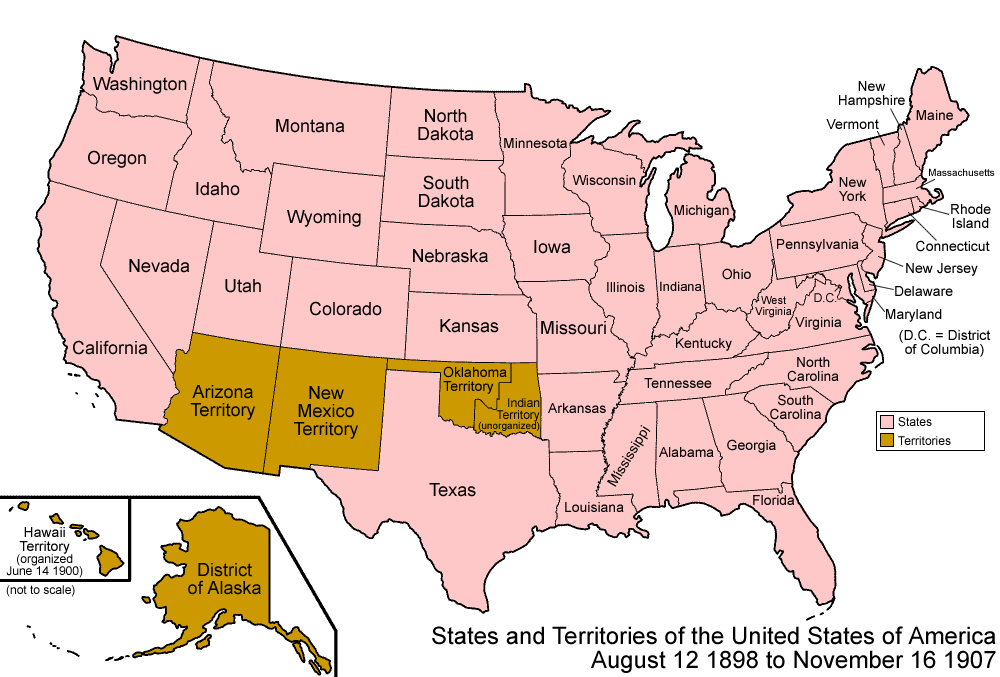

== Reconstruction era ==
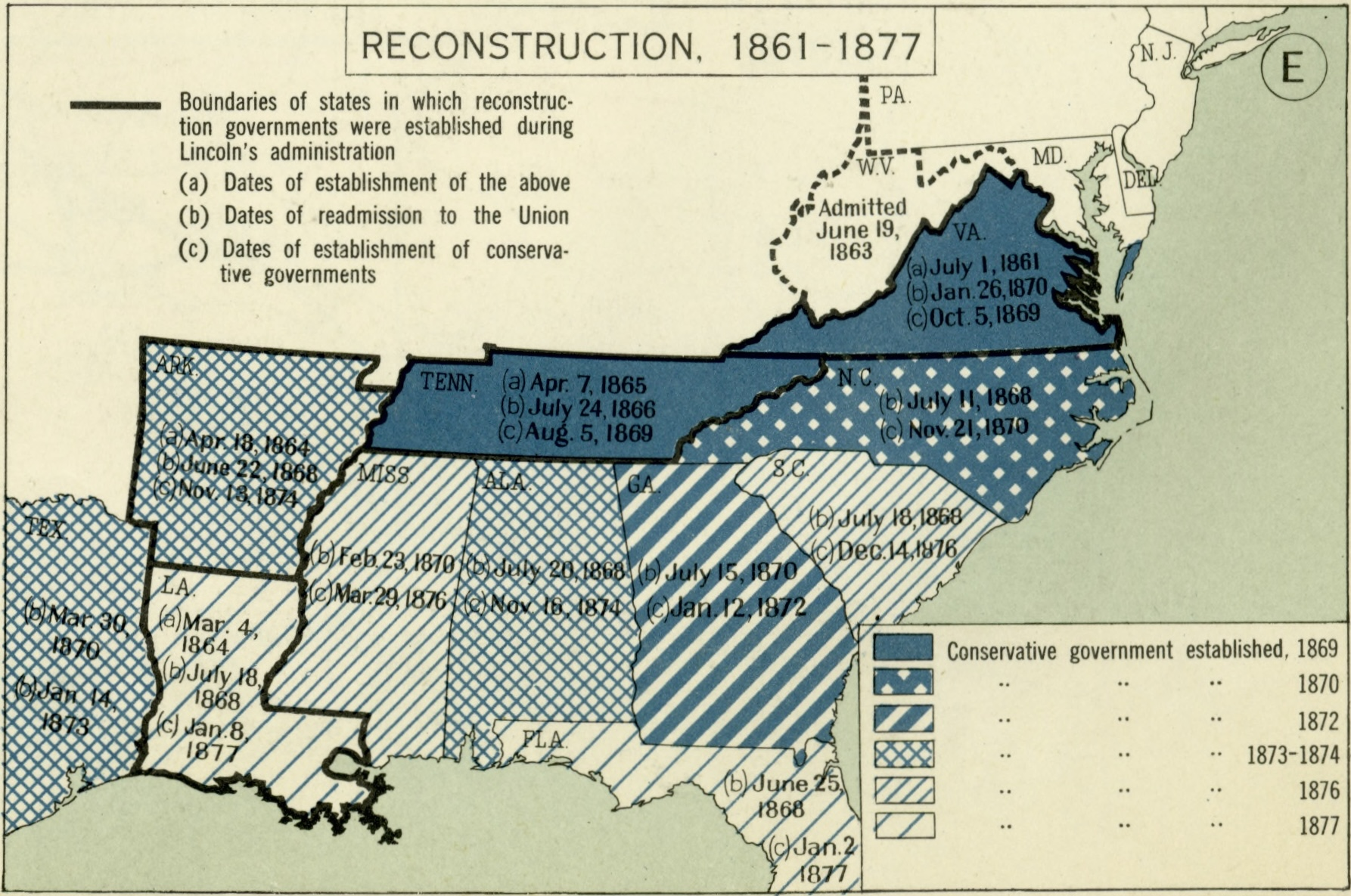
Map of Reconstruction in the United States, 1861–1877.

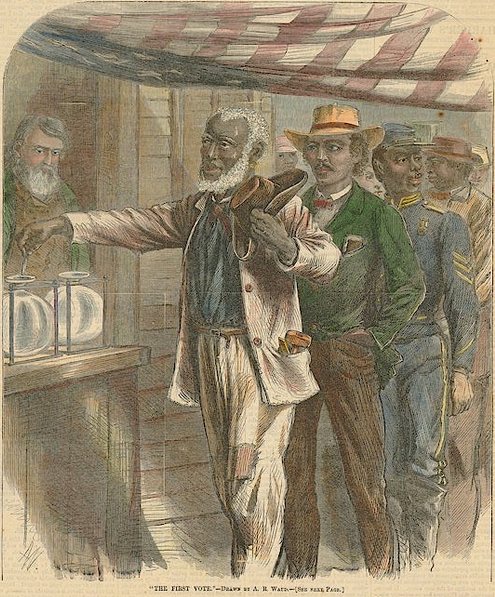
Reconstruction gave male, Black farmers, businessmen and soldiers the right to vote for the first time in 1867, as celebrated by Harper's Weekly on its front cover, Nov. 16, 1867.

Reconstruction was the period from 1863 to 1877, in which the federal government temporarily took control—one by one—of the Southern states of the Confederacy. Before his assassination in April 1865, President Abraham Lincoln had announced moderate plans for reconstruction to re-integrate the former Confederates as fast as possible. Lincoln set up the Freedmen's Bureau in March 1865, to aid former enslaved people in finding education, health care, and employment. The final abolition of slavery was achieved by the Thirteenth Amendment, ratified in December 1865. However, Lincoln was opposed by the Radical Republicans within his own party who feared that the former Confederates would never truly give up on slavery and Confederate nationalism, and would always try to reinstate them behind-the-scenes. As a result, the Radical Republicans tried to impose legal restrictions that would strip most ex-rebels' rights to vote and hold elected office. The Radicals were opposed by Lincoln's vice president and successor, Tennessee Democrat Andrew Johnson. However, the Radicals won the critical elections of 1866, winning enough seats in Congress to override President Johnson's vetoes of such legislation. They even successfully impeached President Johnson (in the House of Representatives), and almost removed him from office (in the Senate) in 1868. Meanwhile, they gave the South's "freedmen" new constitutional and federal legal protections.

The Radicals' reconstruction plans took effect in 1867 under the supervision of the U.S. Army, allowing a Republican coalition of Freedmen, sympathetic local whites, and recent arrivals from the North to take control of Southern state governments. They ratified the Fourteenth Amendment, giving enormous new powers to the federal courts to deal with justice at the state level. These state governments borrowed heavily to build railroads and public schools, increasing taxation rates. The backlash of increasingly fierce opposition to these policies drove most of the sympathetic local whites out of the Republican Party and into the Democratic Party. President Ulysses S. Grant enforced civil rights protections for African-Americans that were being challenged in South Carolina, Mississippi, and Louisiana. The Fifteenth Amendment was ratified in 1870 giving African-Americans the right to vote in American elections.

U.S. Representative Thaddeus Stevens was one of the major policymakers regarding Reconstruction, and obtained a House vote of impeachment against President Andrew Johnson. Hans Trefousse, his leading biographer, concludes that Stevens "was one of the most influential representatives ever to serve in Congress. [He dominated] the House with his wit, knowledge of parliamentary law, and sheer willpower, even though he was often unable to prevail."

Reconstruction ended at different times in each state, the last in 1877, when Republican Rutherford B. Hayes won the contentious presidential election of 1876 over his opponent, Samuel J. Tilden. To deal with disputed electoral votes, Congress set up an Electoral Commission. It awarded the disputed votes to Hayes. The white South accepted the "Compromise of 1877" knowing that Hayes proposed to end Army control over the remaining three state governments in Republican hands. White Northerners accepted that the Civil War was over and that Southern whites posed no threat to the nation.

The end of Reconstruction marked the end of the brief period of civil rights and civil liberties for African Americans in the South, where most lived. Reconstruction caused permanent resentment, distrust, and cynicism among white Southerners toward the federal government, and helped create the "Solid South," which typically voted for the (then-)socially conservative Democrats for all local, state, and national offices. White supremacists created a segregated society through "Jim Crow Laws" that made black people second-class citizens with very little political power or public voice. The white elites (called the "Redeemers"—the southern wing of the "Bourbon Democrats") were in firm political and economic control of the south until the rise of the Populist movement in the 1890s. Local law enforcement was weak in rural areas, allowing outraged mobs to use lynching to redress alleged-but-often-unproven crimes charged to black people.

Historians' interpretations of the Radical Republicans have dramatically shifted over the years, from the pre-1950 view of them as tools of big business motivated by partisanship and hatred of the white South, to the perspective of the neoabolitionists of the 1950s and afterwards, who applauded their efforts to give equal rights to the freed slaves.

In the South itself the interpretation of the tumultuous 1860s differed sharply by race. Americans often interpreted great events in religious terms. Historian Wilson Fallin contrasts the interpretation of Civil War and Reconstruction in white versus black using Baptist sermons in Alabama. White preachers expressed the view that:

God had chastised them and given them a special mission – to maintain orthodoxy, strict Biblicism, personal piety, and traditional race relations. Slavery, they insisted, had not been sinful. Rather, emancipation was a historical tragedy and the end of Reconstruction was a clear sign of God's favor.

In sharp contrast, Black preachers interpreted the Civil War, emancipation and Reconstruction as:

God's gift of freedom. They appreciated opportunities to exercise their independence, to worship in their own way, to affirm their worth and dignity, and to proclaim the fatherhood of God and the brotherhood of man. Most of all, they could form their own churches, associations, and conventions. These institutions offered self-help and racial uplift, and provided places where the gospel of liberation could be proclaimed. As a result, black preachers continued to insist that God would protect and help them; God would be their rock in a stormy land.

Historians in the 21st century typically consider Reconstruction to be a failure, but they "disagree on what caused Reconstruction to fail, focusing on whether it went too far, too fast or did not go far enough."

However, historian Mark Summers in 2014 sees a positive outcome:

if we see Reconstruction's purpose as making sure that the main goals of the war would be filled, of a Union held together forever, of a North and South able to work together, of slavery extirpated, and sectional rivalries confined, of a permanent banishment of the fear of vaunting appeals to state sovereignty, backed by armed force, then Reconstruction looks like what in that respect it was, a lasting and unappreciated success.

== The West ==
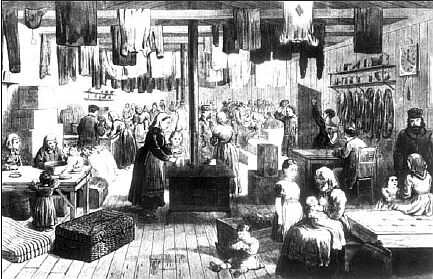
Temporary quarters for Volga Germans in central Kansas, 1875

In 1869, the first transcontinental railroad opened up the far west mining and ranching regions. Travel from New York to San Francisco now took six days instead of six months. After the Civil War, many from the East Coast and Europe were lured west by reports from relatives and by extensive advertising campaigns promising "the Best Prairie Lands", "Low Prices", "Large Discounts For Cash", and "Better Terms Than Ever!". The new railroads provided the opportunity for migrants to go out and take a look, with special family tickets, the cost of which could be applied to land purchases offered by the railroads. Farming the plains was indeed more difficult than back east. Water management was more critical, lightning fires were more prevalent, the weather was more extreme, rainfall was less predictable. The fearful stayed home. The actual migrants looked beyond fears of the unknown. Their chief motivation to move west was to find a better economic life than the one they had. Farmers sought larger, cheaper and more fertile land; merchants and tradesmen sought new customers and new leadership opportunities. Laborers wanted higher paying work and better conditions. With the Homestead Act of 1862 providing free land to citizens and the railroads selling cheap lands to European farmers, the settlement of the Great Plains was swiftly accomplished, and the frontier had virtually ended by 1890.

=== American Indian assimilation ===
Expansion into the plains and mountains by miners, ranchers and most of settlers led to conflict with some of the regional American Indian tribes. The government insisted the American Indians either move into the general society and become assimilated, or remain on assigned reservations. State and territorial militias used force to keep those choosing reservation life from threatening nearby tribes or settlers. The violence petered out in the 1880s and practically ceased after 1890. By 1880 the buffalo herds, a foundation for the hunting economy, had disappeared.

American Indians had the choice of living on reservations. The US government provided food, supplies, education and medical care. Individuals could move out on their own in Western society and earning wages, typically on a ranch. Reformers wanted to give as many American Indians as possible the opportunity to own and operate their own farms and ranches, and the issue was how to give individual Indians land owned by the tribe. To assimilate the Indians into American society, reformers set up training programs and schools, such as the Carlisle Indian Industrial School in Carlisle, Pennsylvania, that produced many prominent Indian leaders. The anti-assimilation traditionalists on the reservations, however, resisted integration. The reformers decided the solution was to allow Indians still on reservations to own land as individuals.

The Dawes Act of 1887 was an effort to integrate American Indians into the mainstream; the majority accepted integration and were absorbed into American society, leaving a trace of American Indian ancestry in millions of American families. Those who refused to assimilate remained in poverty on the reservations, supported by Federal food, medicine and schooling. In 1934, U.S. policy was reversed again by the Indian Reorganization Act which attempted to protect tribal and communal life on the reservations.

=== Farming ===
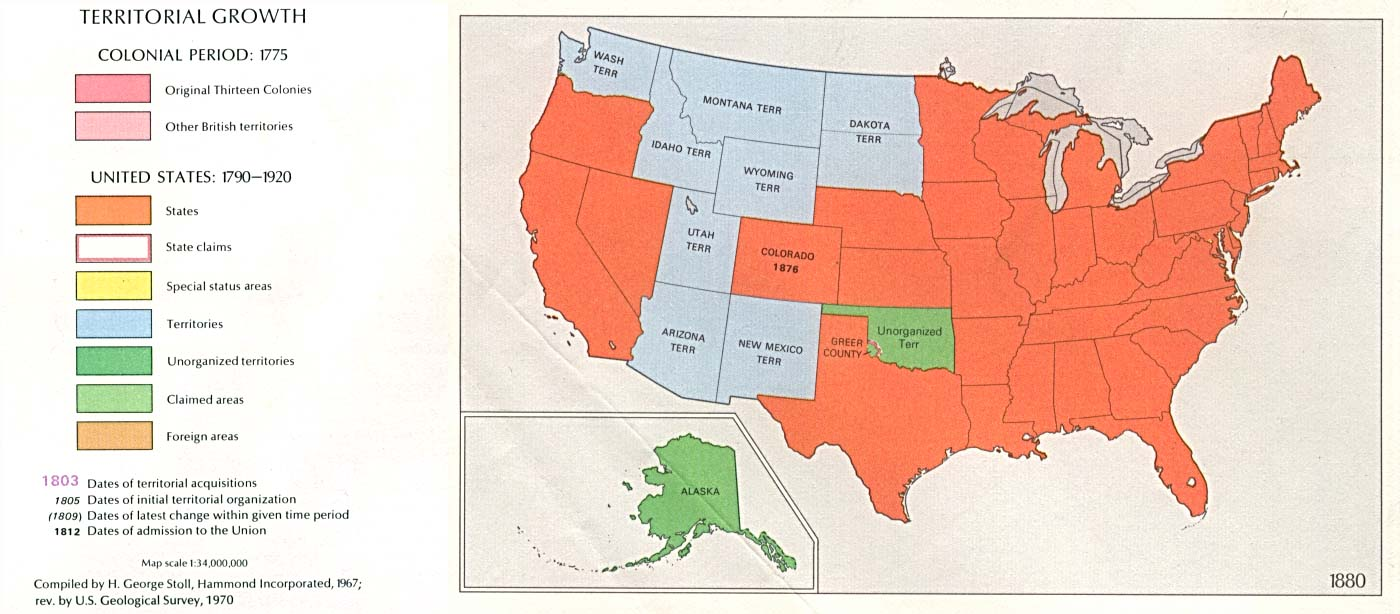
Map of the United States, 1870–80. Orange indicates statehood, light blue territories, and green unorganized territories.

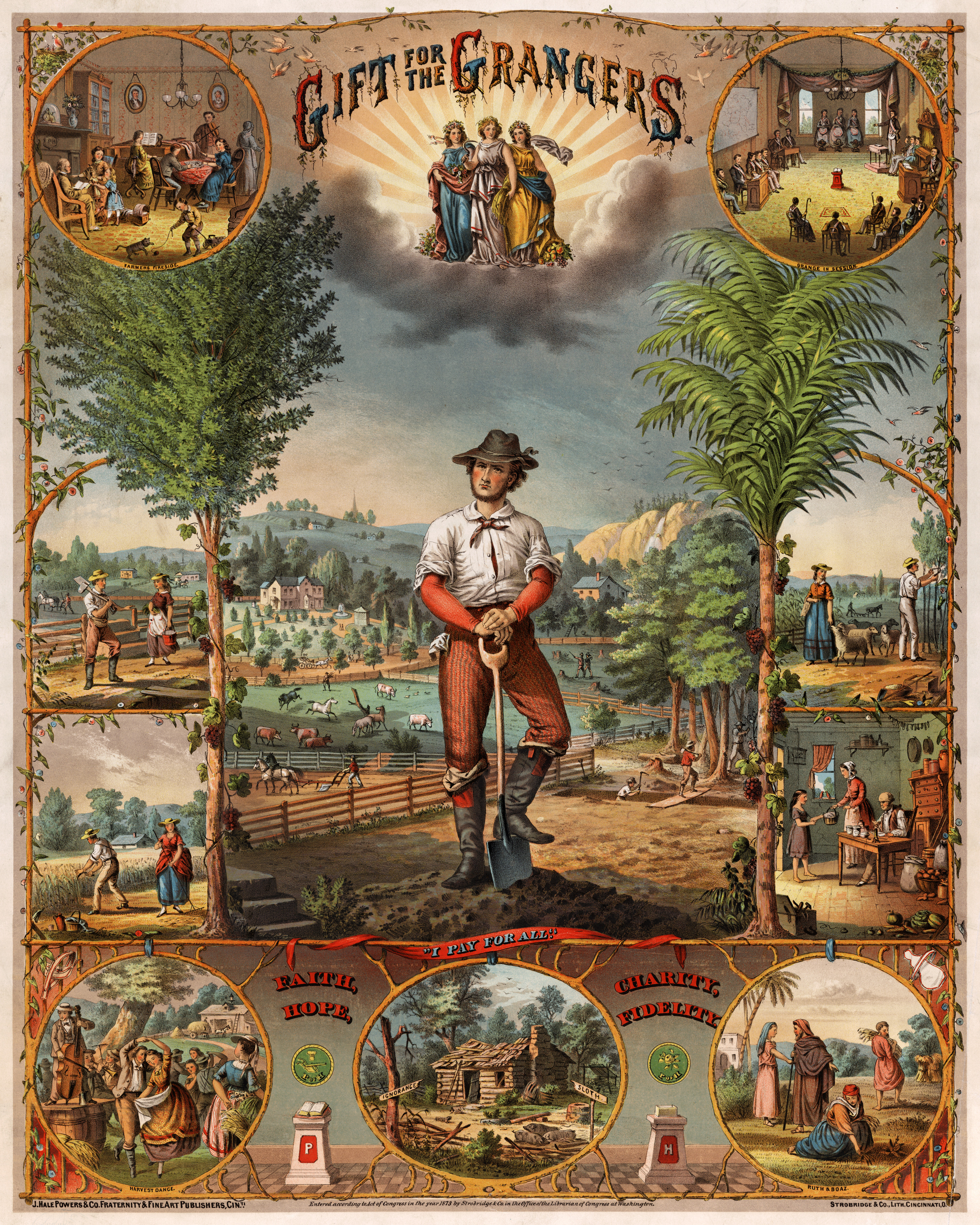
Grange poster hailing the yeoman farmer, 1873

A dramatic expansion in farming took place. The number of farms tripled from 2.0 million in 1860 to 6.0 million in 1905. The number of people living on farms grew from about 10 million in 1860 to 22 million in 1880 to 31 million in 1905. The value of farms soared from $8.0 billion in 1860 to $30 billion in 1906.

The federal government issued 160-acre (65 ha) tracts virtually free to settlers under the Homestead Act of 1862. Even larger numbers purchased lands at very low interest from the new railroads, which were trying to create markets. The railroads advertised heavily in Europe and brought over, at low fares, hundreds of thousands of farmers from Germany, Scandinavia and Britain.

Despite their remarkable progress and general prosperity, 19th-century U.S. farmers experienced recurring cycles of hardship, caused primarily by falling world prices for cotton and wheat.

Along with the mechanical improvements which greatly increased yield per unit area, the amount of land under cultivation grew rapidly throughout the second half of the century, as the railroads opened up new areas of the West for settlement. The wheat farmers enjoyed abundant output and good years from 1876 to 1881 when bad European harvests kept the world price high. They then suffered from a slump in the 1880s when conditions in Europe improved. The farther west the settlers went, the more dependent they became on the monopolistic railroads to move their goods to market, and the more inclined they were to protest, as in the Populist movement of the 1890s. Wheat farmers blamed local grain elevator owners (who purchased their crop), railroads and eastern bankers for the low prices.

The first organized effort to address general agricultural problems was the Grange movement that reached out to farmers. It grew to 20,000 chapters and 1.6 million members. The Granges set up their own marketing systems, stores, processing plants, factories and cooperatives. Most went bankrupt. The movement also enjoyed some political success during the 1870s. A few Midwestern states passed "Granger Laws", limiting railroad and warehouse fees.

=== Family life ===
Few single men attempted to operate a farm; farmers clearly understood the need for a hard-working wife, and numerous children, to handle the many chores, including child-rearing, feeding and clothing the family, managing the housework, and feeding the hired hands. During the early years of settlement, farm women played an integral role in assuring family survival by working outdoors. After a generation or so, women increasingly left the fields, thus redefining their roles within the family. New conveniences such as sewing and washing machines encouraged women to turn to domestic roles. This was further supported by the scientific housekeeping movement, promoted across the land by the media and government extension agents, as well as county fairs which featured achievements in home cookery and canning, advice columns for women in the farm papers, and home economics courses in the schools.

Although the eastern image of farm life on the prairies emphasizes the isolation of the lonely farmer and farm life, in reality rural folk created a rich social life for themselves. For example, many joined a local branch of the Grange; a majority had ties to local churches. It was popular to organize activities that combined practical work, abundant food, and simple entertainment such as barn raisings, corn huskings, and quilting bees. One could keep busy with scheduled Grange meetings, church services, and school functions. The womenfolk organized shared meals and potluck events, as well as extended visits between families.

Childhood on the American frontier is contested territory. One group of scholars argues the rural environment was salubrious for it allowed children to break loose from urban hierarchies of age and gender, promoted family interdependence, and in the end produced children who were more self-reliant, mobile, adaptable, responsible, independent and more in touch with nature than their urban or eastern counterparts. However other historians offer a grim portrait of loneliness, privation, abuse, and demanding physical labor from an early age.

== Industrialization ==
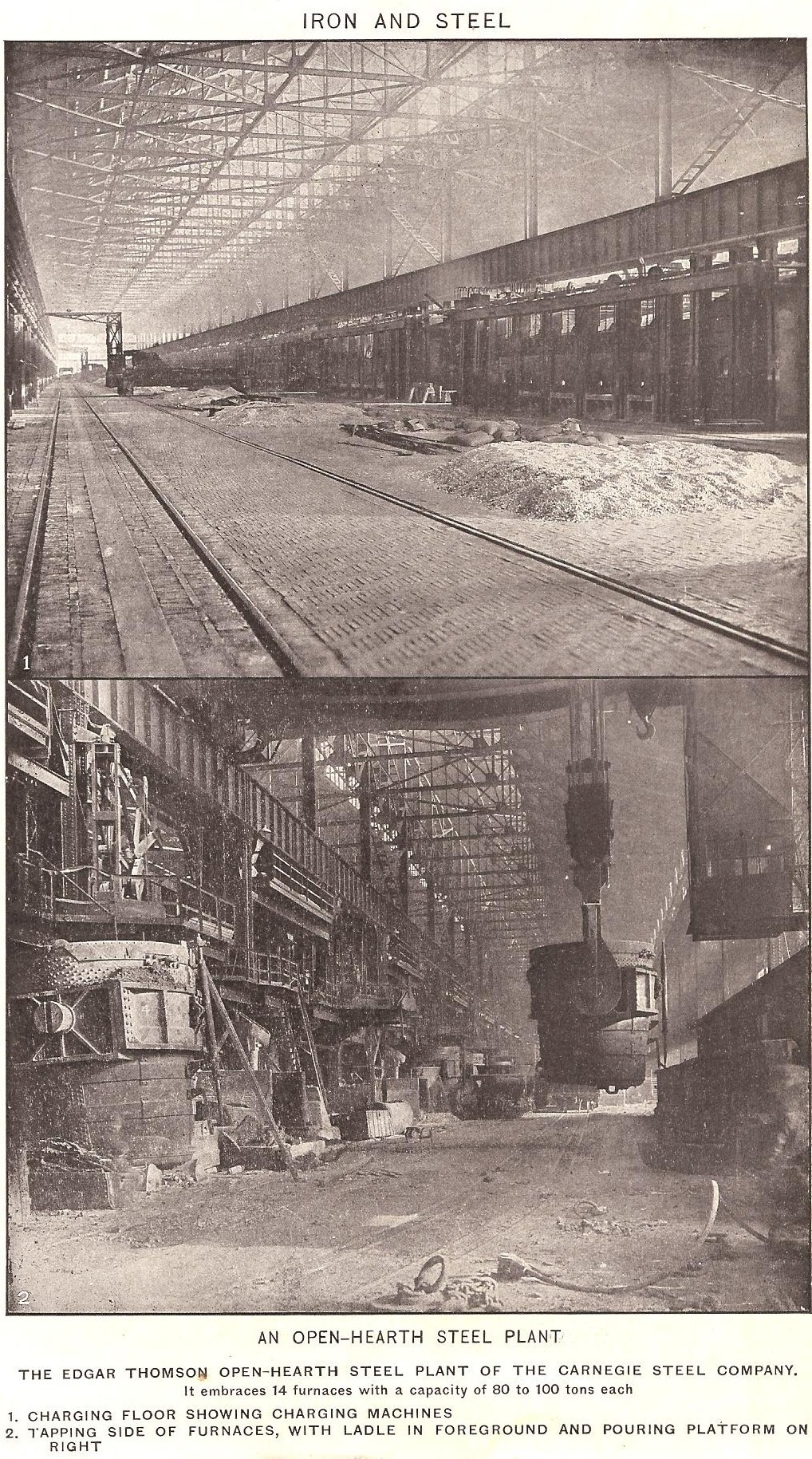
Blast furnace at Edgar Thomson Steel Works near Pittsburgh, 1915

From 1865 to about 1913, the U.S. grew to become the world's leading industrial nation. Land and labor, the diversity of climate, the ample presence of railroads (as well as navigable rivers), and the natural resources all fostered the cheap extraction of energy, fast transport, and the availability of capital that powered this Second Industrial Revolution. The average annual income (after inflation) of non-farm workers grew by 75% from 1865 to 1900, and then grew another 33% by 1918.

Where the First Industrial Revolution shifted production from artisans to factories, the Second Industrial Revolution pioneered an expansion in organization, coordination, and the scale of industry, spurred on by technology and transportation advancements. Railroads opened the West, creating farms, towns, and markets where none had existed. The first transcontinental railroad, built by nationally oriented entrepreneurs with British money and Irish and Chinese labor, provided access to previously remote expanses of land. Railway construction boosted opportunities for capital, credit, and would-be farmers.

New technologies in iron and steel manufacturing, such as the Bessemer process and open-hearth furnace, combined with similar innovations in chemistry and other sciences to vastly improve productivity. New communication tools, such as the telegraph and telephone allowed corporate managers to coordinate across great distances. Innovations also occurred in how work was organized, typified by Frederick Winslow Taylor's ideas of scientific management.

To finance the larger-scale enterprises required during this era, the corporation emerged as the dominant form of business organization. Corporations expanded by merging, creating single firms out of competing firms known as "trusts" (a form of monopoly). High tariffs sheltered U.S. factories and workers from foreign competition, especially in the woolen industry. Federal railroad land grants enriched investors, farmers and railroad workers, and created hundreds of towns and cities. Business often went to court to stop labor from organizing into unions or from organizing strikes.

The nation's industrial base remained firmly rooted in the Northeast and Midwestern states. The South benefited less and remained poor, rural, and backward, although the abolition of slavery and the breakup of large plantations after the Civil War had a leveling effect and reduced the wealth inequality that had become a serious problem in the late antebellum period—during the postwar years it became possible for many lower class Southerners to own land for the first time. The South did not attract immigration outside New Orleans due to its lack of major port cities and the ethnic makeup of the non-black population remained primarily Anglo-Irish with small communities of Jews, French Huguenots, and Germans. Some Southerners felt keenly aware of their backwardness and believed the South ought to compete with Northern industry—one Atlanta newspaper editor in the 1880s wrote "A Confederate army veteran died. He was buried in a Yankee suit in a Yankee coffin in a hole dug with a Yankee shovel. The only things the South furnished were the hole and the corpse." Attempts at trying to set up industry in the South met with only modest success as the region lacked investment money and Northern financiers were content to keep the place as a source of raw materials for Northern factories. The sweltering summer weather of the region also discouraged industrial activity. The most successful Southern industrial venture by far was textiles which benefited from low labor costs and right to work laws forbidding workers from unionizing.

Powerful industrialists, such as Andrew Carnegie, John D. Rockefeller and Jay Gould, known collectively by their critics as "robber barons", held great wealth and power, so much so that in 1888 Rutherford B. Hayes noted in his diary that the United States ceased being a government for the people and had been replaced by a "government of the corporation, by the corporation, and for the corporation." Critics in this period also bemoaned the disappearance of great political minds in America—the age of Thomas Jefferson, James Madison, and Henry Clay was gone and the nation's best and brightest gravitated to industry rather than government or politics. In a context of cutthroat competition for wealth accumulation, the skilled labor of artisans gave way to well-paid skilled workers and engineers, as the nation deepened its technological base. Meanwhile, a steady stream of immigrants encouraged the availability of cheap labor, especially in mining and manufacturing.

=== Labor and management ===
In the fast-growing industrial sector, wages were about double the level in Europe, but the work was harder with less leisure. Economic depressions swept the nation in 1873–75 and 1893–97, with low prices for farm goods and heavy unemployment in factories and mines. Full prosperity returned in 1897 and continued (with minor dips) to 1920.

The pool of unskilled labor was constantly growing, as unprecedented numbers of immigrants—27.5 million between 1865 and 1918 —entered the U.S. Most were young men eager for work. The rapid growth of engineering and the need to master the new technology created a heavy demand for engineers, technicians, and skilled workers. Before 1874, when Massachusetts passed the nation's first legislation limiting the number of hours women and child factory workers could perform to 10 hours a day, virtually no labor legislation existed in the country. Child labor reached a peak around 1900 and then declined (except in Southern textile mills) as compulsory education laws kept children in school. It was finally ended in the 1930s.

=== Labor organization ===
The first major effort to organize workers' groups on a nationwide basis appeared with The Noble Order of the Knights of Labor in 1869. Originally a secret, ritualistic society organized by Philadelphia garment workers, it was open to all workers, including African Americans, women, and farmers. The Knights grew slowly until they succeeded in facing down the great railroad baron, Jay Gould, in an 1885 strike. Within a year, they added 500,000 workers to their rolls, far more than the thin leadership structure of the Knights could handle.

The Knights of Labor soon fell into decline, and their place in the labor movement was gradually taken by the American Federation of Labor (AFL). Rather than open its membership to all, the AFL, under former cigar-makers union official Samuel Gompers, focused on skilled workers. His objectives were "pure and simple": increasing wages, reducing hours, and improving working conditions. As such, Gompers helped turn the labor movement away from the socialist views earlier labor leaders had espoused. The AFL would gradually become a respected organization in the U.S., although it would have nothing to do with unskilled laborers.

In times of economic depression, layoffs and wage cuts angered workers, leading to violent labor conflicts in 1877 and 1894. In the Great Railroad Strike in 1877, railroad workers across the nation went on strike in response to a 10-percent pay cut. Attempts to break the strike led to bloody uprisings in several cities. The Haymarket Riot took place in 1886, when an anarchist allegedly threw a bomb that killed several police dispersing a strike rally at the McCormick Harvesting Machine Company in Chicago. Anarchists were arrested and convicted, weakening the movement.

In commemoration of the Haymarket Riots, May 1 would be acknowledged by socialist and communist movements worldwide as International Workers' Day, Labor Day, or May Day, and became an official holiday in many countries. In 1893, President Cleveland signed into law a bill making Labor Day an official US holiday, but on the first weekend of September to avoid the socialistic connotations of May Day.

At its peak, the Knights claimed 700,000 members. By 1890, membership had plummeted to fewer than 100,000, then faded away. The killing of policemen greatly embarrassed the Knights of Labor, which was not involved with the bomb but which took much of the blame.

In the riots of 1892 at Carnegie's steel works in Homestead, Pennsylvania, a group of 300 Pinkerton detectives, whom the company had hired to break a bitter strike by the Amalgamated Association of Iron, Steel and Tin Workers, were fired upon by strikers and 10 were killed. As a result, the National Guard was called in to guard the plant; non-union workers were hired and the strike broken. The Homestead plant completely barred unions until 1937.

Two years later, wage cuts at the Pullman Palace Car Company, just outside Chicago, led to a strike, which, with the support of the American Railway Union, soon brought the nation's railway industry to a halt. The shutdown of rail traffic meant the virtual shutdown of the entire national economy, and President Grover Cleveland acted vigorously. He secured injunctions in federal court, which Eugene Debs and the other strike leaders ignored. Cleveland then sent in the Army to stop the rioting and get the trains moving. The strike collapsed, as did the ARU, and Debs, a once middle-of-the-road social reformer, converted to a full-blown socialist while serving a sentence in Federal prison for defying a court order to cease striking.

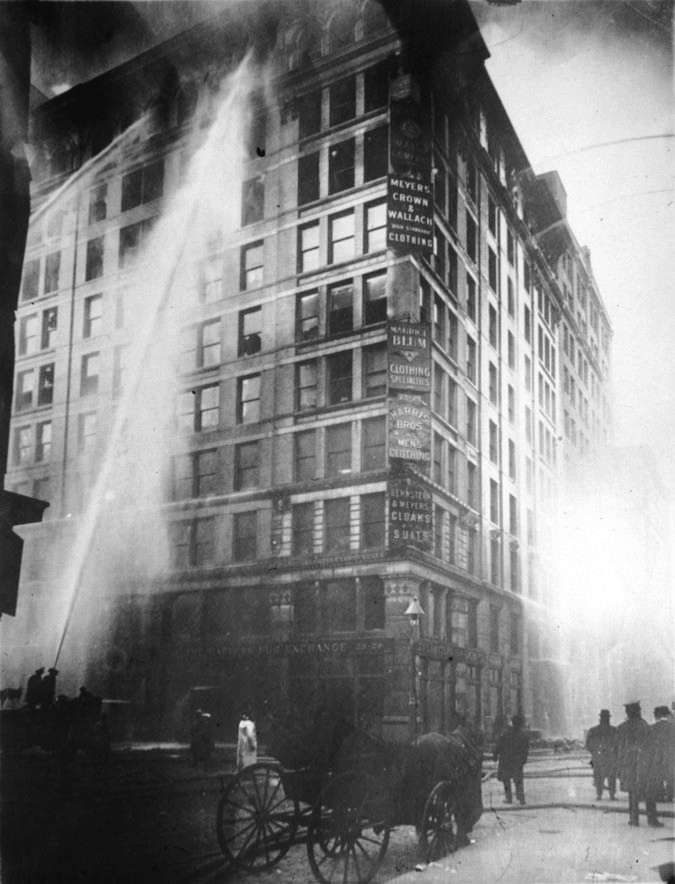
The 1911 Triangle Shirtwaist Factory fire killed 146 garment workers.

The most militant working class organization of the 1905–1920 era was the Industrial Workers of the World (IWW), formed largely in response to abysmal labor conditions (in 1904, the year before its founding, 27,000 workers were killed on the job) and discrimination against women, minorities, and unskilled laborers by other unions, particularly the AFL. The "Wobblies," as they were commonly known, gained particular prominence from their incendiary and revolutionary rhetoric. Openly calling for class warfare, direct action, workplace democracy and "One Big Union" for all workers regardless of sex, race or skills, the Wobblies gained many adherents after they won a difficult 1912 textile strike (commonly known as the "Bread and Roses" strike) in Lawrence, Massachusetts. They proved ineffective in managing peaceful labor relations and members dropped away, primarily because the union failed to build long-term worker organizations even after a successful campaign, leaving the workers involved at the mercy of employers once the IWW had moved on. However, this was not fatal to the union. That the IWW directly challenged capitalism via direct action at the point of production prompted swift and decisive action from the state, especially during and after World War I. According to historian Howard Zinn, "the IWW became a threat to the capitalist class, exactly when capitalist growth was enormous and profits huge." The IWW strongly opposed the 1917–18 war effort and faced a campaign of repression from the federal government. More than a few Wobblies, such as Frank Little, were beaten or lynched by mobs or died in American jails.

== Gilded Age ==
The "Gilded Age" that was enjoyed by the topmost percentiles of American society after the recovery from the Panic of 1873 floated on the surface of the newly industrialized economy of the Second Industrial Revolution. It was further fueled by a period of wealth transfer that catalyzed dramatic social changes. It created for the first time a class of the super-rich "captains of industry", the "robber barons" whose network of business, social and family connections ruled a largely White Anglo-Saxon Protestant social world that possessed clearly defined boundaries. The term Gilded Age for this era was adopted by 1920s historians who took it from Mark Twain and Charles Dudley Warner's 1873 book, The Gilded Age: A Tale of Today, which pointed out the ironic difference between a "gilded" and a Golden Age.

Politically, the Republican Party was in ascendancy and would largely remain so until the 1930s with brief interruptions. The Civil War had collapsed the Democrats' national machine and given the GOP the chance to entrench its own national machine that held for 70 years. Republicans fully took credit for winning the war and abolishing slavery, and were firmly established as the party of big business, the gold standard, and economic protectionism. Republican voter strength came mostly out of the small and medium sized towns and rural areas of the Northeast and Midwest, as well as the majority of Union army veterans—the Grand Army of the Republic, a veterans' fraternal organization that wielded huge political power in the 1880s-1890s, was also referred to as "Generally All Republicans." The addition of new states in the West gave the GOP still more national strength.

Democrats in the North were mostly an urban party that relied on immigrant laborers for a base, however in the Gilded Age there was not a major ideological gap between the two parties outside tariffs versus free trade. In the South, the end of Reconstruction quickly established the Democrat Party's absolute rule over the region that held for a century. Only small pockets of Republican support existed in the South once black voter suppression was complete by the 1890s—usually these consisted of counties that had not supported secession during the war. German-Americans provided a small but stable Republican presence in a few areas of Texas and Eastern Tennessee remained a largely Republican area.

Nonetheless, national elections in the Gilded Age were close, contentious, and attracted a lot of energy and voter enthusiasm. This began to change after William McKinley's victory in 1896. For 17 years afterward, the country came close to a one party Republican state and there were periods when Democrats were nearly reduced to a regional Southern party. Voter turnout and enthusiasm sharply fell off.

With the end of Reconstruction, there were few major political issues at stake and the 1880 presidential election was the quietest in a long time. James Garfield, the Republican candidate, won a very close election, but a few months into his administration was shot by a disgruntled public office seeker. Garfield was succeeded by Vice President Chester Arthur.

Reformers, especially the "Mugwumps" complained that powerful parties made for corruption during the Gilded Age or "Third Party System". Voter enthusiasm and turnout during the period 1872–1892 was very high, often reaching practically all men. The major issues involved modernization, money, railroads, corruption, and prohibition. National elections, and many state elections, were very close. The 1884 presidential election saw a mudslinging campaign in which Republican James G. Blaine was defeated by Democrat Grover Cleveland, a reformer. During Cleveland's presidency, he pushed to have Congress cut tariff duties. He also expanded civil services and vetoed many private pension bills. Many people were worried that these issues would hurt his chances in the 1888 election. When they expressed these concerns to Cleveland, he said "What is the use of being elected or reelected, unless you stand for something?" As was typical of the age, Cleveland took a conservative, constrained view of the Constitution and Federal powers. When the Texas port of Indianola was flattened by a devastating 1886 hurricane, he declined to give Federal relief funds for the town as he believed the Constitution did not grant him any such authority. "Although the people should support the government, the government should not support the people," Cleveland said.

The dominant social classes of the Northeast proclaimed an "American Renaissance", which could be identified by the creation of new public institutions such as hospitals, museums, colleges, opera houses, libraries, and orchestras. As well as by the Beaux-Arts architectural style, which became prominent after Chicago hosted the World's Columbian Exposition of 1893.

== Social history ==
Urbanization (the rapid growth of cities) went hand in hand with industrialization (the growth of factories and railroads), as well as expansion of farming. The rapid growth was made possible by high levels of immigration.

=== Immigration ===
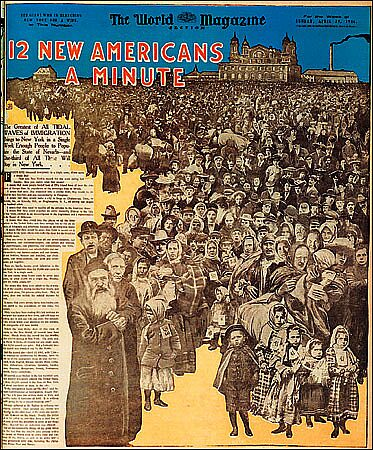
The Sunday magazine of the New York World appealed to immigrants with this 1906 cover page celebrating their arrival at Ellis Island.

From 1865 through 1918 an unprecedented and diverse stream of immigrants arrived in the United States, 27.5 million in total. In all, 24.4 million (89%) came from Europe, including 2.9 million from Great Britain, 2.2 million from Ireland, 2.1 million from Scandinavia, 3.8 million from Germany, 4.1 million from Italy, 7.8 million from Russia and other parts of Central and Eastern Europe. Another 1.7 million came from Canada. Most came through the port of New York City, and from 1892, through the immigration station on Ellis Island, but various ethnic groups settled in different locations. New York and other large cities of the East Coast became home to large Jewish, Irish, and Italian populations, while many Germans and Central Europeans moved to the Midwest, obtaining jobs in industry and mining. At the same time, about one million French Canadians migrated from Quebec to New England.

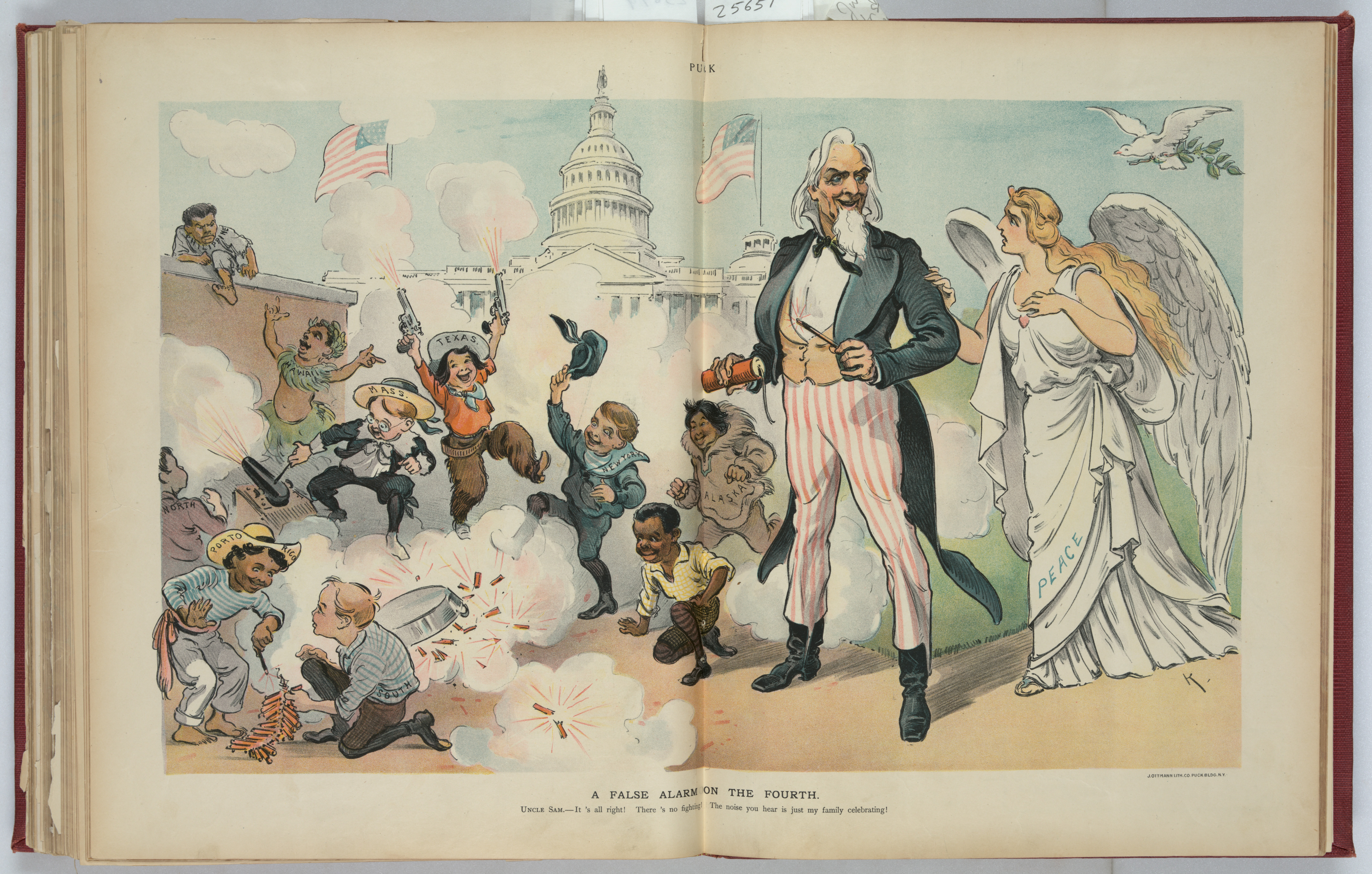
Celebrating ethnic pluralism on 4th of July. 1902 Puck editorial cartoon.

Immigrants were pushed out of their homelands by poverty or religious threats, and pulled to America by jobs, farmland and kin connections. They found economic opportunity at factories, mines and construction sites, and found farm opportunities in the Plains states.

While most immigrants were welcomed, Asians were not. Many Chinese had been brought to the west coast to construct railroads, but unlike European immigrants, they were seen as being part of an entirely alien culture. After intense anti-Chinese agitation in California and the west, Congress passed the Chinese Exclusion Act in 1882. An informal agreement in 1907, the Gentlemen's Agreement, stopped Japanese immigration.

Some immigrants stayed temporarily in the U.S. then returned home, often with savings that made them relatively prosperous. Most, however, permanently left their native lands and stayed in hope of finding a better life in the New World. This desire for freedom and prosperity led to the famous term, the American Dream.

=== Religion ===
The Third Great Awakening was a period of renewal in Evangelical Protestantism from the late 1850s to the 1900s. It affected pietistic Protestant denominations and had a strong sense of social activism. It gathered strength from the postmillennial theology that the Second Coming of Christ would come after mankind had reformed the entire earth. A major component was the Social Gospel Movement, which applied Christianity to social issues and gained its force from the Awakening, as did the worldwide missionary movement. New groupings emerged, such as the Holiness movement and Nazarene movements, and Christian Science.

At the same time, the Catholic Church grew rapidly, with a base in the German, Irish, Polish, and Italian immigrant communities, and a leadership drawn from the Irish. The Catholics were largely working class and concentrated in the industrial cities and mining towns, where they built churches, parochial schools, and charitable institutions, as well as colleges. Catholic clergy in the United States were generally young, energetic, and had progressive ideas; they stood in sharp contrast to the stagnant, embattled, and reactionary Catholic Church in Europe.

The Jewish community grew rapidly, largely from immigrants fleeing anti-Semitic pogroms in Russia and Austria-Hungary. Settling primarily in and around New York City, these new Jewish Americans avoided the Reform synagogues of the older German Jews and instead formed Orthodox and Conservative synagogues.

=== Nadir of race relations ===
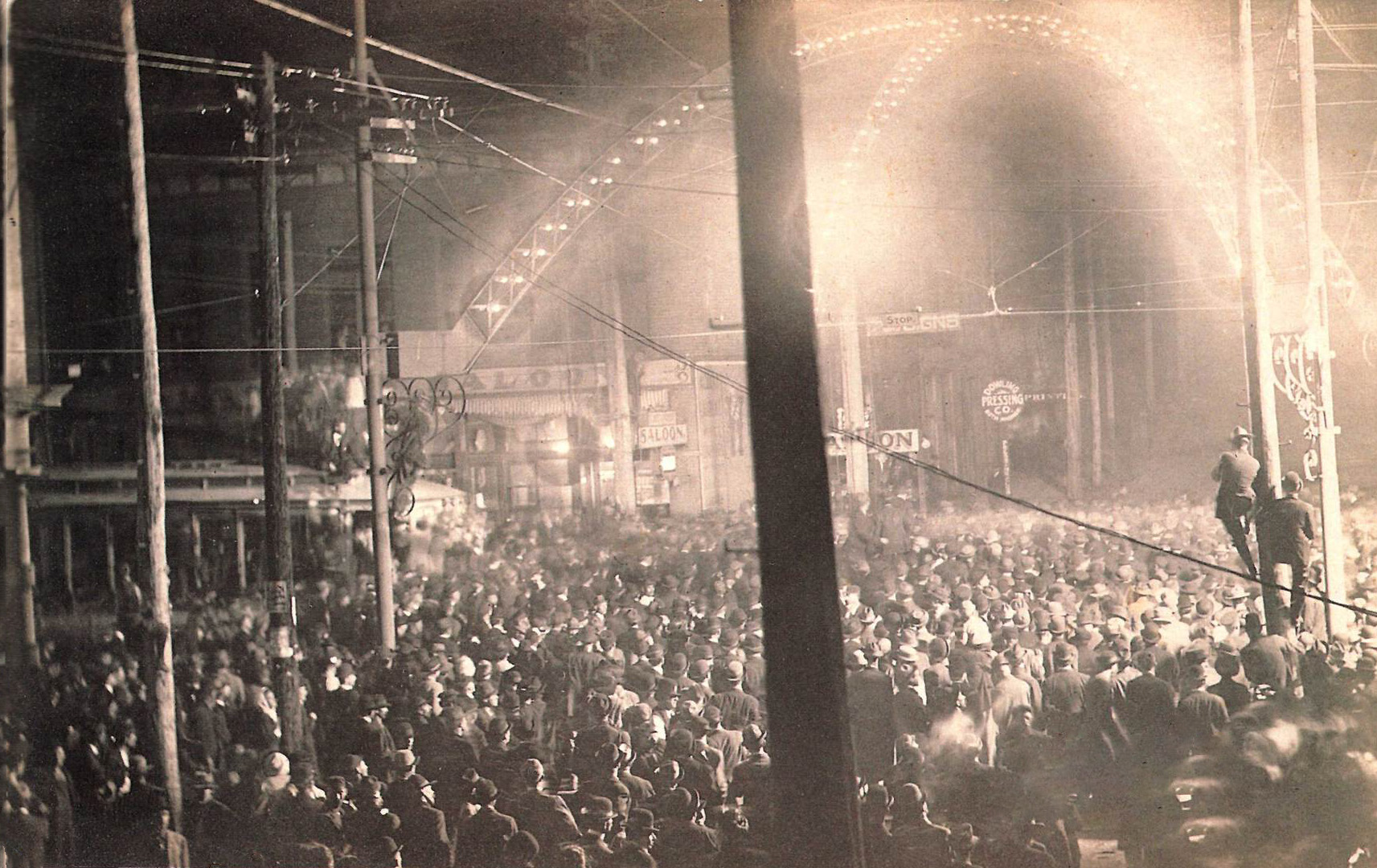
The mob-style lynching of William "Froggie" James, Cairo, Illinois, 1909

Even before Reconstruction was officially concluded in 1877, the Supreme Court made a series of rulings curbing the 14th Amendment. Federal attempts at enforcing civil rights essentially ceased until the 1950s.

In the 1896 case Plessy v. Ferguson, the U.S. Supreme Court effectively upheld the Jim Crow system of racial segregation by its "separate but equal" doctrine.

The 1880s marked the beginning of the lynching epidemic. More than 4,000 lynchings are documented across the United States from the 1880s to the 1930s. They occurred in all regions of the country aside from New England, but were primarily centered in the South and West. While in the Southern states most lynching victims were black, in the West they were usually Native Americans, Chinese, or Mexicans. Although uncommon, there were occasional lynchings of whites as well. Lynchings of black people frequently involved mutilations, burning, and torture. State and local officials often condemned mob violence but the perpetrators were seldom brought to justice even when their identities were known.

Black people accused of crimes often fared poorly in the courtrooms of Southern states as well. Juries were entirely white and liable to sentence black defendants to death at a higher rate than their white counterparts. A longtime injustice cited by civil rights organizations was the widespread execution of black men for non-homicidal rape—a number of states in this time had rape as a capital crime which theoretically applied to all citizens but critics pointed out that most convictions involved a black man accused of an attack on a white female and called it a form of legal lynching. However, these executions continued as late as the 1950s-60s until the Supreme Court in the 1970s limited capital punishment in the United States to strictly first degree murder. Black people were also heavily used by state prisons and local jails in the South as gang labor on chain gangs.

D. W. Griffith's The Birth of a Nation (1915), the first great American film, made heroes of the Ku Klux Klan in Reconstruction.

=== Populism ===
By 1880, the Granger movement began to decline and was replaced by the Farmers' Alliance. From the beginning, the Farmers' Alliance were political organizations with elaborate economic programs. According to one early platform, its purpose was to "unite the farmers of America for their protection against class legislation and the encroachments of concentrated capital." Their program also called for the regulation—if not the outright nationalization—of the railroads; currency inflation to provide debt relief; the lowering of the tariff; and the establishment of government-owned storehouses and low-interest lending facilities. These were known as the Ocala Demands.

During the late 1880s, a series of droughts devastated the West. Western Kansas lost half its population during a four-year span. By 1890, the level of agrarian distress was at an all-time high. Mary Elizabeth Lease, a noted populist writer and agitator, told farmers that they needed to "raise less corn and more hell". Working with sympathetic Democrats in the South and small third parties in the West, the Farmers' Alliance made a push for political power. From these elements, a new political party, known as the Populist Party, emerged. The elections of 1890 brought the new party into coalitions that controlled parts of state government in a dozen Southern and Western states and sent a score of Populist senators and representatives to Congress.

Its first convention was in 1892, when delegates from farm, labor and reform organizations met in Omaha, Nebraska, determined at last to make their mark on a U.S. political system that they viewed as hopelessly corrupted by the monied interests of the industrial and commercial trusts.

The pragmatic portion of the Populist platform focused on issues of land, railroads and money, including the unlimited coinage of silver. The Populists showed impressive strength in the West and South in the 1892 elections, and their candidate for president, James B. Weaver, polled more than a million votes. It was the currency question, however, pitting advocates of silver against those who favored gold, that soon overshadowed all other issues. Agrarian spokesmen in the West and South demanded a return to the unlimited coinage of silver. Convinced that their troubles stemmed from a shortage of money in circulation, they argued that increasing the volume of money would indirectly raise prices for farm products and drive up industrial wages, thus allowing debts to be paid with inflated dollars.

Conservative groups and the financial classes, on the other hand, believed that such a policy would be disastrous, and they insisted that inflation, once begun, could not be stopped. Railroad bonds, the most important financial instrument of the time, were payable in gold. If fares and freight rates were set in half-price silver dollars, railroads would go bankrupt in weeks, throwing hundreds of thousands of men out of work and destroying the industrial economy. Only the gold standard, they said, offered stability.

The financial Panic of 1893 heightened the tension of this debate. Bank failures abounded in the South and Midwest; unemployment soared and crop prices fell badly. The crisis, and President Cleveland's inability to solve it, nearly broke the Democratic Party.

The Democratic Party, which supported silver and free trade, absorbed the remnants of the Populist movement as the presidential elections of 1896 neared. The Democratic convention that year was witness to one of the most famous speeches in U.S. political history. Pleading with the convention not to "crucify mankind on a cross of gold", William Jennings Bryan, the young Nebraskan champion of silver, won the Democrats' presidential nomination. The remaining Populists also endorsed Bryan, hoping to retain some influence by having a voice inside the Bryan movement. Despite carrying the South and all the West except California and Oregon, Bryan lost the more populated, industrial North and East—and the election—to the Republican William McKinley with his campaign slogan "A Full Dinner Pail".

In 1897, the economy began to improve, mostly from restored business confidence. Silverites—who did not realize that most transactions were handled by bank checks, not sacks of gold—believed the new prosperity was spurred by the discovery of gold in the Yukon. In 1898, the Spanish–American War drew the nation's attention further away from Populist issues. If the movement was dead, however, its ideas were not. Once the Populists supported an idea, it became so tainted that the vast majority of American politicians rejected it; only years later, after the taint had been forgotten, was it possible to achieve Populist reforms, such as the direct popular election of Senators in 1914.

== Women's suffrage ==
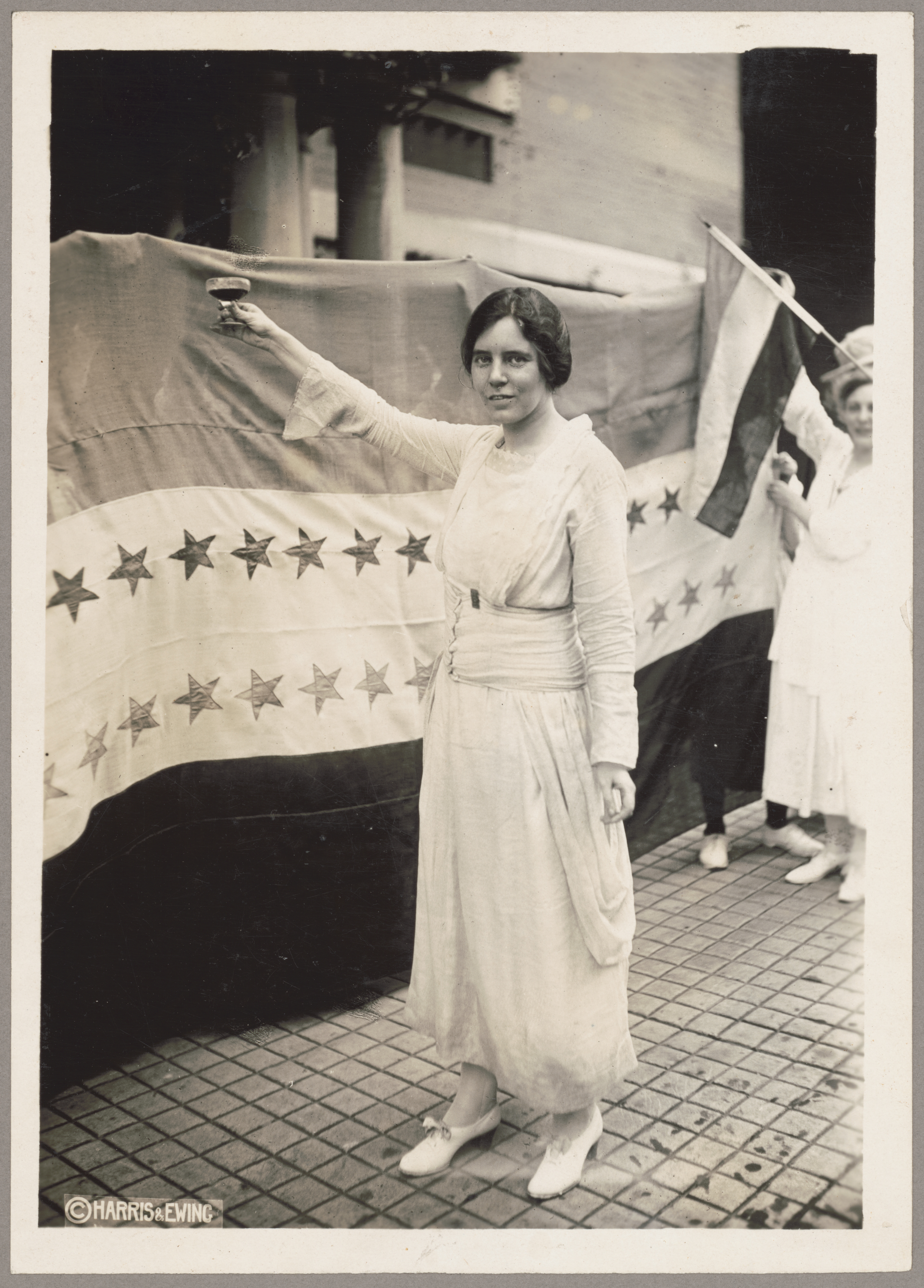
Alice Paul stands victorious before the Women's Suffrage Amendment's ratification banner.

The women's suffrage movement began with the 1848 Seneca Falls Convention; many of the activists became politically aware during the abolitionist movement. The movement reorganized after the Civil War, gaining experienced campaigners, many of whom had worked for prohibition in the Women's Christian Temperance Union. By the end of the 19th century a few western states had granted women full voting rights, though women had made significant legal victories, gaining rights in areas such as property and child custody.

Around 1912, the movement, which had grown sluggish, began to reawaken. This put an emphasis on its demands for equality and arguing that the corruption of American politics demanded purification by women because men could no longer do their job. Protests became increasingly common as suffragette Alice Paul led parades through the capitol and major cities. Paul split from the large National American Woman Suffrage Association (NAWSA), which favored a more moderate approach and supported the Democratic Party and Woodrow Wilson, led by Carrie Chapman Catt, and formed the more militant National Woman's Party. Suffragists were arrested during their "Silent Sentinels" pickets at the White House, the first time such a tactic was used, and were taken as political prisoners.

Finally, the suffragettes were ordered released from prison, and Wilson urged Congress to pass a Constitutional amendment enfranchising women. The old anti-suffragist argument that only men could fight a war, and therefore only men deserved the franchise, was refuted by the enthusiastic participation of tens of thousands of American women on the home front in World War I. Across the world, grateful nations gave women the right to vote. Furthermore, most of the Western states had already given women the right to vote in state and national elections, and the representatives from those states, including the first voting woman Jeannette Rankin of Montana, demonstrated that Women's Suffrage was a success. The main resistance came from the south, where white leaders were worried about the threat of black women voting. Nevertheless, Congress passed the Nineteenth Amendment in 1919. It became a constitutional law on August 26, 1920, after ratification by the 36th required state.

== Foreign policy ==
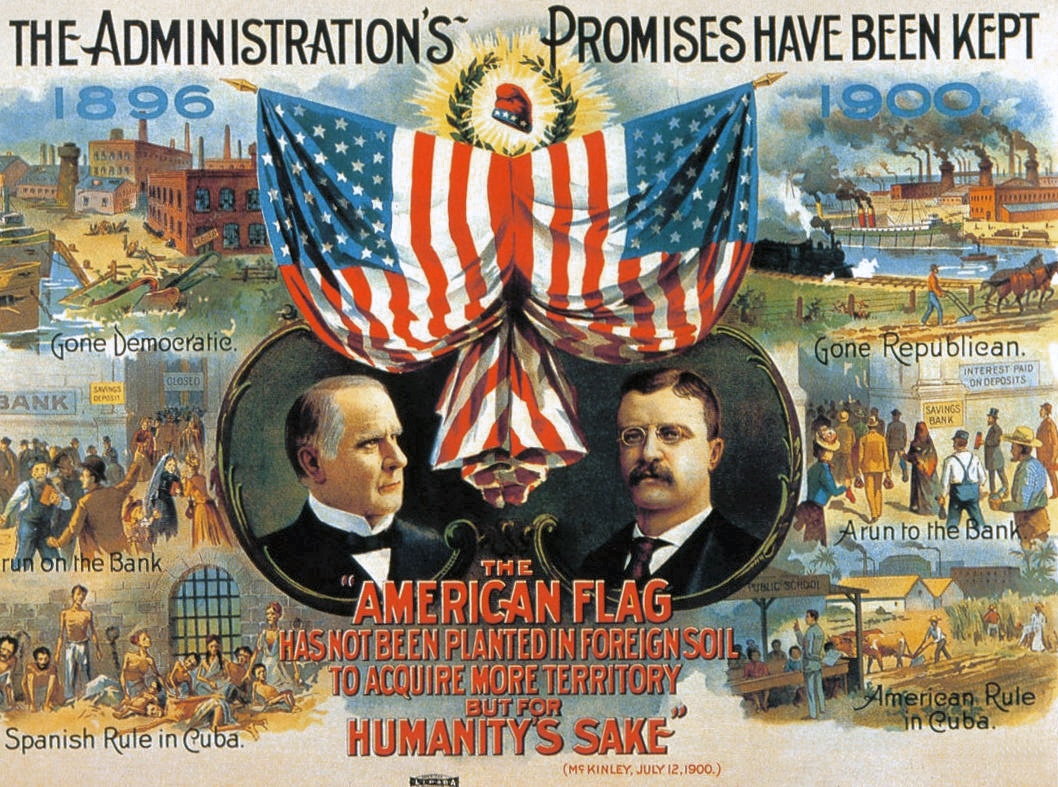
Republican campaign poster, 1900, compares prosperity now with depression in 1896, and stresses humanitarian foreign policy.

With the landslide election victory of William McKinley, who had risen to national prominence six years earlier with the passage of the McKinley Tariff of 1890, a high tariff was passed in 1897 and a decade of rapid economic growth and prosperity ensued, building national self-confidence. McKinley brought in a new governing philosophy, one that dominated the 20th century, in which politics was the arena in which compromises among interest groups were worked out for the national benefit. His system of politics emphasized economic growth, prosperity for all, and pluralism that provided benefits for every group. He rejected programs such as prohibition and immigration restriction that were designed to hurt an enemy. He felt parties had the duty to enact the people's will and educate them to new ideas.

=== War with Spain ===
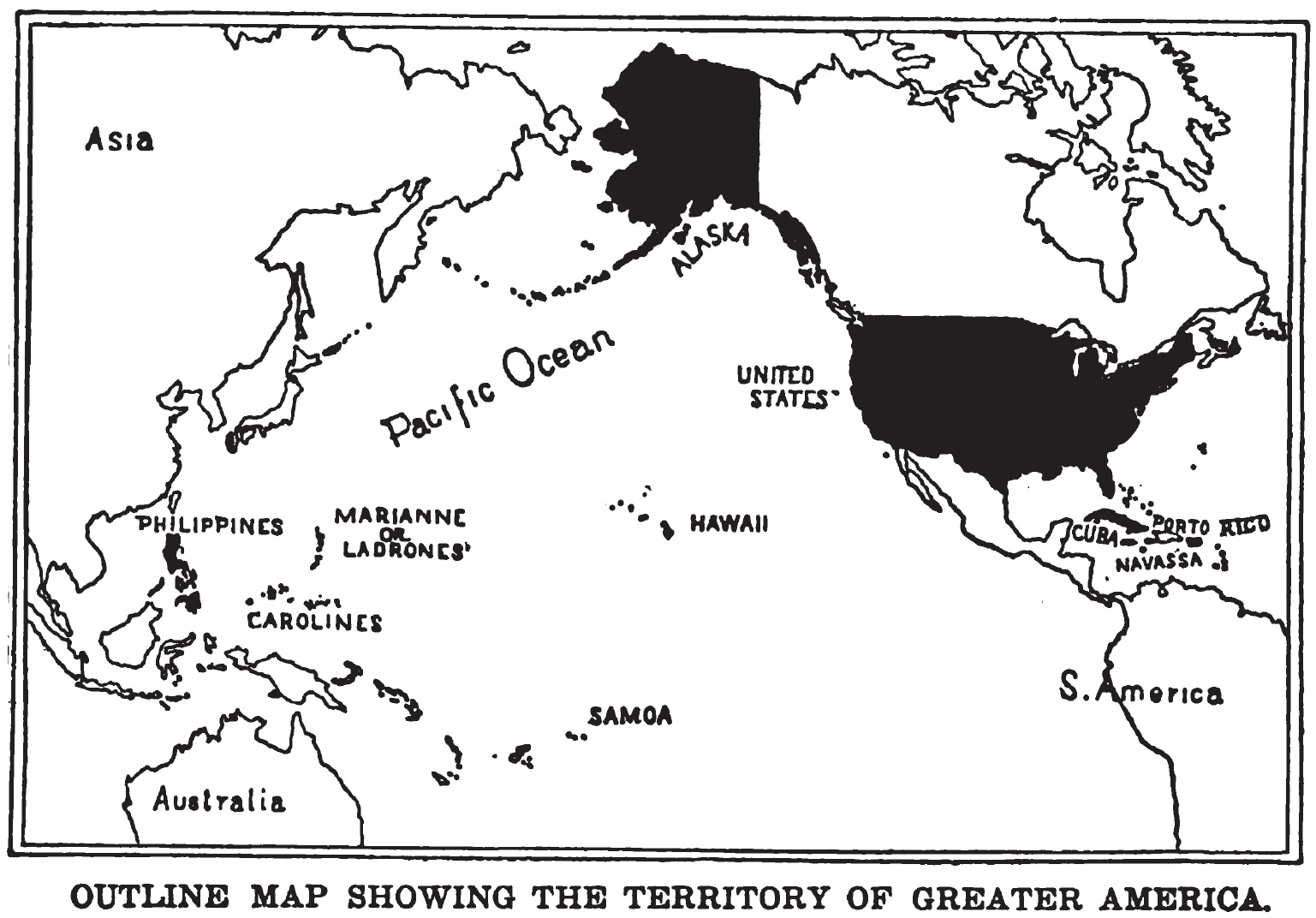
Post-Spanish–American War map of "Greater America", including Cuba and the Philippines

Spain had once controlled a vast colonial empire, but by the second half of the 19th century only Cuba, Puerto Rico, the Philippines, and some African possessions remained: Spanish West Africa (Spanish Sahara), Spanish Guinea, Spanish Morocco and the Canary Islands. The Cubans had been in a state of rebellion since the 1870s, and American newspapers, particularly New York City papers of William Randolph Hearst and Joseph Pulitzer, printed sensationalized "Yellow Journalism" stories about Spanish atrocities in Cuba. However, these lurid stories reached only a small fraction of voters; most read sober accounts of Spanish atrocities, and they called for intervention. On February 15, 1898, the battleship USS Maine exploded in Havana Harbor. Although it was unclear precisely what caused the blast, many Americans believed it to be the work of a Spanish mine, an attitude encouraged by the yellow journalism of Hearst and Pulitzer. The military was rapidly mobilized as the U.S. prepared to intervene in the Cuban revolt. It was made clear that no attempt at annexation of Cuba would be made and that the island's independence would be guaranteed. Spain considered this a wanton intervention in its internal affairs and severed diplomatic relations. War was declared on April 25.

The Spanish were quickly defeated, and Theodore Roosevelt's Rough Riders gained fame in Cuba. Meanwhile, Commodore George Dewey's fleet crushed the Spanish in the faraway Philippines. Spain capitulated, ending the three-month-long war and recognizing Cuba's independence. Puerto Rico, Guam, and the Philippines were ceded to the United States.

Although U.S. capital investments within the Philippines and Puerto Rico were small, some politicians hoped they would be strategic outposts for expanding trade with Latin America and Asia, particularly China. That never happened and after 1903 American attention turned to the Panama Canal as the key to opening new trade routes. The Spanish–American War thus began the active, globally oriented American foreign policy that continues to the present day.

=== Philippines ===
The U.S. acquired the Philippines from Spain on December 10, 1898, via the Treaty of Paris, which ended the Spanish–American War. However, Philippine nationalists led by Emilio Aguinaldo declared independence and in 1898 began fighting the American troops when hostilities between the two nations began. The Philippine–American War ended in 1902 after Aguinaldo was captured and swore allegiance to the U.S. Likewise the other insurgents accepted American rule and peace prevailed, except in some remote islands under Muslim control.

Roosevelt continued the McKinley policies of removing the Catholic friars (with compensation to the Pope) and spreading Protestantism in the islands, upgrading the infrastructure, introducing public health programs, and launching a program of economic and social modernization. The enthusiasm shown in 1898–99 for colonies cooled off, and Roosevelt saw the islands as "our heel of Achilles." He told Taft in 1907, "I should be glad to see the islands made independent, with perhaps some kind of international guarantee for the preservation of order, or with some warning on our part that if they did not keep order we would have to interfere again." By then the President and his foreign policy advisers turned away from Asian issues to concentrate on Latin America, and Roosevelt redirected Philippine policy to prepare the islands to become the first Western colony in Asia to achieve self-government, holding its first democratic elections in 1907. The Jones Law, passed in 1916, increased Filipino self-governance and guaranteed eventual Philippine independence, which was finally achieved in 1946.

=== Latin America ===
The U.S. demanded Spain stop its oppressive policies in Cuba; public opinion (overruling McKinley) led to the short, successful Spanish–American War in 1898. The U.S. permanently took over Puerto Rico and temporarily held Cuba. Attention increasingly focused on the Caribbean as the rapid growth of the Pacific states, especially California, revealed the need for a canal across to connect the Atlantic and Pacific Oceans. Plans for one in Nicaragua fell through but under Roosevelt's leadership the U.S. built a canal through Panama, after finding a public health solution to the deadly disease environment. The Panama Canal opened in 1914.

In 1904, Roosevelt announced his "Corollary" to the Monroe Doctrine, stating that the United States would intervene in cases where Latin American governments prove incapable or unstable in the interest of bringing democracy and financial stability to them. The U.S. made numerous interventions, mostly to stabilize the shaky governments and permit the nations to develop their economies. The intervention policy ended in the 1930s and was replaced by the Good Neighbor policy.

In 1909, Nicaraguan President José Santos Zelaya resigned after the triumph of U.S.-backed rebels. This was followed up by the 1912–1933 U.S. occupation of Nicaragua.

The U.S. military occupation of Haiti, in 1915, followed the mob execution of Haiti's leader Vilbrun Guillaume Sam but even more important was the threat of a possible German takeover of the island. Germans controlled 80% of the Haitian economy by 1914 and they were bankrolling revolutions that kept the country in political turmoil. The conquest resulted in a 19-year-long United States occupation of Haiti. Haiti was an exotic locale that suggested black racial themes to numerous American writers including Eugene O'Neill, James Weldon Johnson, Langston Hughes, Zora Neale Hurston and Orson Welles.

Limited American intervention occurred in Mexico as that country fell into a long period of anarchy and civil war starting in 1910. In April 1914, U.S. troops occupied the Mexican port of Veracruz following the Tampico Incident; the reason for the intervention was Woodrow Wilson's desire to overthrow the Mexican dictator Victoriano Huerta. In March 1916, Pancho Villa led 1,500 Mexican raiders in a cross-border attack against Columbus, New Mexico, attacked a U.S. Cavalry detachment, seized 100 horses and mules, burned the town, and killed 17 of its residents. President Woodrow Wilson responded by sending 12,000 troops, under Gen. John J. Pershing, into Mexico to pursue Villa. The Pancho Villa Expedition to capture Villa failed in its objectives and was withdrawn in January 1917.

In 1916, the U.S. occupied the Dominican Republic.

== Progressive Era ==
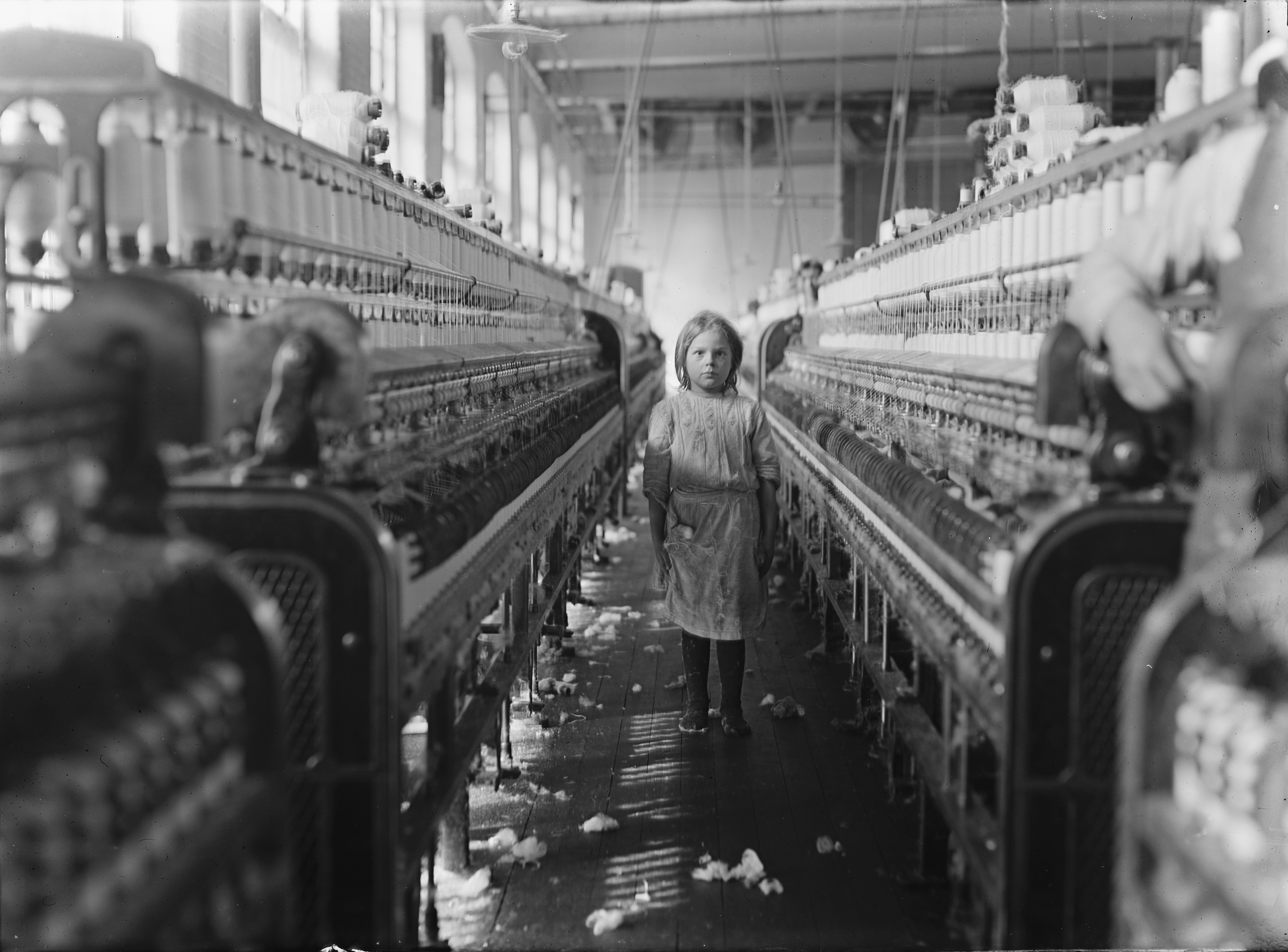
Child laborer, Newberry, South Carolina, 1908

A new spirit of the times, known as "Progressivism", arose in the 1890s and into the 1920s (although some historians date the ending with World War I).

In 1904, reflecting the age, and perhaps prescient of difficulties arising in the early part of the next millennium (including the rise of a demagogue in the land trying to array society into two camps), the Hungarian born Joseph Pulitzer wrote about the dangers ahead for the republic:

Our Republic and its press will rise or fall together. An able, disinterested, public-spirited press, with trained intelligence to know the right and courage to do it, can preserve that public virtue without which popular government is a sham and a mockery. A cynical, mercenary, demagogic press will produce in time a people as base as itself. The power to mould the future of the Republic will be in the hands of the journalists of future generations.

The presidential election of 1900 gave the U.S. a chance to pass judgment on the McKinley Administration, especially its foreign policy. Meeting at Philadelphia, the Republicans expressed jubilation over the successful outcome of the war with Spain, the restoration of prosperity, and the effort to obtain new markets through the Open Door Policy. The 1900 election was mostly a repeat of 1896 except for imperialism being added as a new issue (Hawaii had been annexed in 1898). William Jennings Bryan added anti-imperialism to his tired-out free silver rhetoric, but he was defeated in the face of peace, prosperity and national optimism.

President William McKinley was enjoying great popularity as he began his second term, but it would be cut short. In September 1901, while attending an exposition in Buffalo, New York, McKinley was shot by an anarchist. He was the third president to be assassinated, all since the Civil War. Vice President Theodore Roosevelt assumed the presidency.

Political corruption was a central issue, which reformers hoped to solve through civil service reforms at the national, state, and local level, replacing political hacks with professional technocrats. The 1883 Civil Service Reform Act (or Pendleton Act), which placed most federal employees on the merit system and marked the end of the so-called "spoils system", permitted the professionalization and rationalization of the federal administration. However, local and municipal government remained in the hands of often-corrupt politicians, political machines, and their local "bosses". Henceforth, the spoils system survived much longer in many states, counties, and municipalities, such as the Tammany Hall ring, which survived well into the 1930s when New York City reformed its own civil service. Illinois modernized its bureaucracy in 1917 under Frank Lowden, but Chicago held out against civil service reform until the 1970s.

Many self-styled progressives saw their work as a crusade against urban political bosses and corrupt "robber barons". There were increased demands for effective regulation of business, a revived commitment to public service, and an expansion of the scope of government to ensure the welfare and interests of the country as the groups pressing these demands saw fit. Almost all the notable figures of the period, whether in politics, philosophy, scholarship, or literature, were connected at least in part with the reform movement. In many cases progressives, most notably the Roosevelts, hailed from old blue blood families that dated to the colonial era and felt resentment at their increased irrelevance in the face of the new class of robber baron capitalists, most of whom had been born to modest means.

Trenchant articles dealing with trusts, high finance, impure foods, and abusive railroad practices began to appear in the daily newspapers and in such popular magazines as McClure's and Collier's. Their authors, such as the journalist Ida M. Tarbell, who crusaded against the Standard Oil Trust, became known as "Muckrakers". In his novel, The Jungle, Upton Sinclair exposed unsanitary conditions in the Chicago meat packing houses.

The hammering impact of Progressive Era writers bolstered aims of certain sectors of the population, especially a middle class caught between political machines and big corporations, to take political action. Many states enacted laws to improve the conditions under which people lived and worked. At the urging of such prominent social critics as Jane Addams, child labor laws were strengthened and new ones adopted, raising age limits, shortening work hours, restricting night work, and requiring school attendance. By the early 20th century, most of the larger cities and more than half the states had established an eight-hour day on public works. Equally important were the Workers' Compensation Laws, which made employers legally responsible for injuries sustained by employees at work. New revenue laws were also enacted, which, by taxing inheritances, laid the groundwork for the contemporary federal income tax.

By the end of the Progressive Era various laws were introduced concerning workplace issues including those related to hours of labor, health and safety, levels and frequency of pay, rest periods, the employment of women and children, compensation for injuries, vacations, and provisions for retirement. In addition, various laws related to social welfare, housing, education, relief of farmers, and public health were introduced.

=== Roosevelt's presidency ===
Roosevelt, a progressive Republican, called for a "Square Deal", and initiated a policy of increased Federal supervision in the enforcement of antitrust laws. Later, extension of government supervision over the railroads prompted the passage of major regulatory bills. One of the bills made published rates the lawful standard, and shippers equally liable with railroads for rebates.

Following Roosevelt's landslide victory in the 1904 election he called for still more drastic railroad regulation, and in June 1906, Congress passed the Hepburn Act. This gave the Interstate Commerce Commission real authority in regulating rates, extended the jurisdiction of the commission, and forced the railroads to surrender their interlocking interests in steamship lines and coal companies. Roosevelt held many meetings, and opened public hearings, in a successful effort to find a compromise for the Coal Strike of 1902, which threatened the fuel supplies of urban America. Meanwhile, Congress had created a new Cabinet Department of Commerce and Labor.

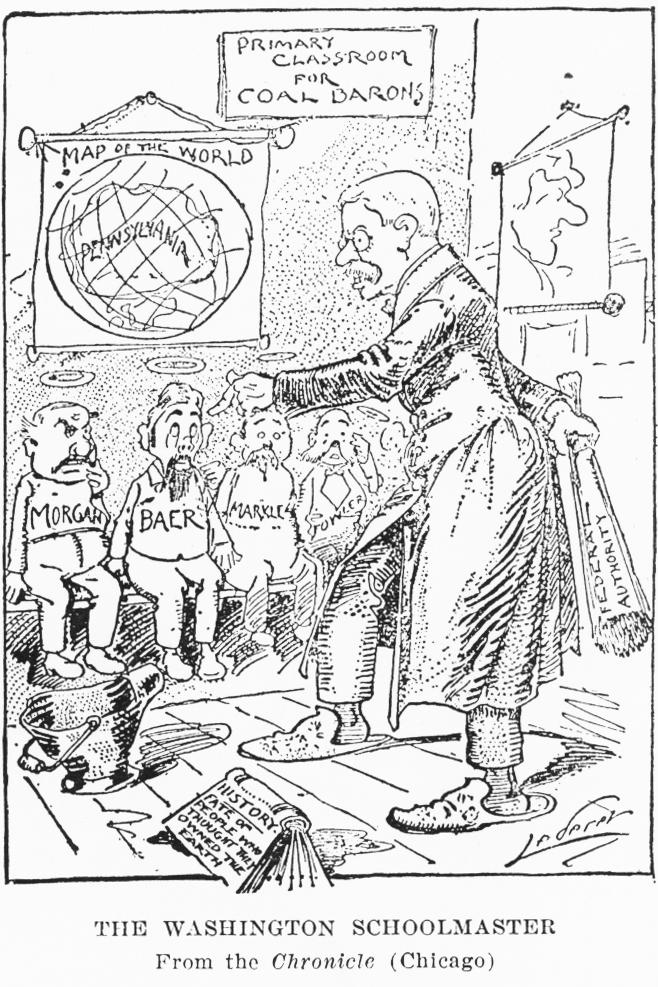
Cartoonist admires the strict TR who teaches the childish coal barons a lesson; they raised the pay rates for minors, but did not recognize the union. By Charles Lederer.

Conservation of the nation's natural resources and beautiful places was a very high priority for Roosevelt, and he raised the national visibility of the issue. The President called for a far-reaching and integrated program of conservation, reclamation and irrigation as early as 1901 in his first annual message to Congress. Whereas his predecessors had set aside 46 million acres (188,000 km^{2}) of timberland for preservation and parks, Roosevelt increased the area to 146 million acres (592,000 km^{2}) and began systematic efforts to prevent forest fires and to retimber denuded tracts. His appointment of his friend Gifford Pinchot as chief forester resulted in vigorous new scientific management of public lands. TR added 50 wildlife refuges, 5 new national parks, and initiated the system of designating national monuments, such as the Devils Tower National Monument.

=== President Taft ===
Roosevelt's popularity was at its peak as the campaign of 1908 neared, but he was unwilling to break the tradition by which no president had held office for more than two terms. Instead, he supported William Howard Taft. On the Democratic side, William Jennings Bryan ran for a third time, but managed to carry only the South. Taft, a former judge, first colonial governor of the U.S.-held Philippines and administrator of the Panama Canal Zone, made some progress with his Dollar Diplomacy.

Taft continued the prosecution of trusts, further strengthened the Interstate Commerce Commission, established a postal savings bank and a parcel post system, expanded the civil service, and sponsored the enactment of two amendments to the United States Constitution. The Sixteenth Amendment authorized a federal income tax, while the Seventeenth Amendment, ratified in 1913, mandated the direct election of U.S. Senators by the people, replacing the prior system established in the original Constitution, in which they were selected by state legislatures.

Yet balanced against these achievements was Taft's support for the Payne–Aldrich Tariff Act with protective schedules that outraged progressive opinion. Protection was the ideological cement holding the Republican coalition together. High tariffs were used by Republicans to promise higher sales to business, higher wages to industrial workers, and higher demand for farm products. Progressive insurgents said it promoted monopoly. Democrats said it was a tax on the little man. It had greatest support in the Northeast, and greatest opposition in the South and West. The Midwest was the battle ground. Insurgents also complained about his opposition to statehood for Arizona because of its progressive constitution; his opposition to environmental activists; and his growing reliance on the conservative wing of his party. His patron Roosevelt became his enemy by 1910. The Republican Party was divided, and an overwhelming vote swept the Democrats back into control of Congress in the 1910 elections.

=== President Wilson ===
Two years later, Woodrow Wilson, the Democratic, progressive governor of the state of New Jersey, campaigned against Taft, the Republican candidate, and against Roosevelt who was appalled by his successor's policies and thus broke his earlier pledge to not run for a third term. As the Republicans would not nominate him, he ran as a third-party Progressive Party candidate, but the ticket became widely known as the Bull Moose Party. The election was mainly a contest between Roosevelt and Wilson, Taft receiving little attention and carrying just eight electoral votes.

Wilson, in a spirited campaign, defeated both rivals. Under his leadership, the new Congress enacted one of the most notable legislative programs in American history. Its first task was tariff revision. "The tariff duties must be altered," Wilson said. "We must abolish everything that bears any semblance of privilege." The Underwood Tariff in 1913 provided substantial rate reductions on imported raw materials and foodstuffs, cotton and woolen goods, iron and steel, and removed the duties from more than a hundred other items. Although the act retained many protective features, it was a genuine attempt to lower the cost of living for American workers.

The second item on the Democratic program was a reorganization of the banking and currency system. "Control," said Wilson, "must be public, not private, must be vested in the government itself, so that the banks may be the instruments, not the masters, of business and of individual enterprise and initiative."

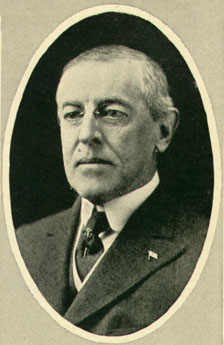
Woodrow Wilson, 1912

Passage of the Federal Reserve Act of 1913 was one of Wilson's most enduring legislative accomplishments, for he successfully negotiated a compromise between Wall Street and the agrarians. The plan built on ideas developed by Senator Nelson Aldrich, who discovered the European nations had more efficient central banks that helped their internal business and international trade. The new organization divided the country into 12 districts, with a Federal Reserve Bank in each, all supervised by a Federal Reserve Board. These banks were owned by local banks and served as depositories for the cash reserves of member banks. Until the Federal Reserve Act, the U.S. government had left control of its money supply largely to unregulated private banks. While the official medium of exchange was gold coins, most loans and payments were carried out with bank notes, backed by the promise of redemption in gold. The trouble with this system was that the banks were tempted to reach beyond their cash reserves, prompting periodic panics during which fearful depositors raced to turn their bank paper into coin. With the passage of the act, greater flexibility in the money supply was assured, and provision was made for issuing federal reserve notes—paper dollars—to meet business demands. The Fed opened in 1914 and played a central role in funding the World War. After 1914, issues of money and banking faded away from the political agenda.

To resolve the long-standing dispute over trusts, the Wilson Administration dropped the "trust-busting" legal strategies of Roosevelt and Taft and relied on the new Federal Trade Commission to issue orders prohibiting "unfair methods of competition" by business concerns in interstate trade. In addition a second law, the Clayton Antitrust Act, forbade many corporate practices that had thus far escaped specific condemnation—interlocking directorates, price discrimination among purchasers, use of the injunction in labor disputes and ownership by one corporation of stock in similar enterprises. After 1914 the trust issue faded away from politics.

The Adamson Act of 1916 established an eight-hour day for railroad labor and solidified the ties between the labor unions and the Democratic Party. The record of achievement won Wilson a firm place in American history as one of the nation's foremost liberal reformers. Wilson's domestic reputation would soon be overshadowed by his record as a wartime president who led his country to victory but could not hold the support of his people for the peace that followed.

== See also ==
- Thomas Alva Edison
- Turn of the century
- History of the United States (1918–1945)
- Timeline of the history of the United States (1860–1899)
- Timeline of the history of the United States (1900–1929)
- Timeline of the American Old West
- Presidency of Abraham Lincoln
- Presidency of Andrew Johnson
- Presidency of Ulysses S. Grant
- Presidency of Rutherford B. Hayes
- Presidency of James A. Garfield
- Presidency of Chester A. Arthur
- First presidency of Grover Cleveland
- Presidency of Benjamin Harrison
- Second presidency of Grover Cleveland
- Presidency of William McKinley
- Presidency of Theodore Roosevelt
- Presidency of William Howard Taft
- Presidency of Woodrow Wilson
