= 1902 anthracite coal strike =

Pennsylvanian Coal Strike

Coal strike of 1902 (Anthracite coal strike)
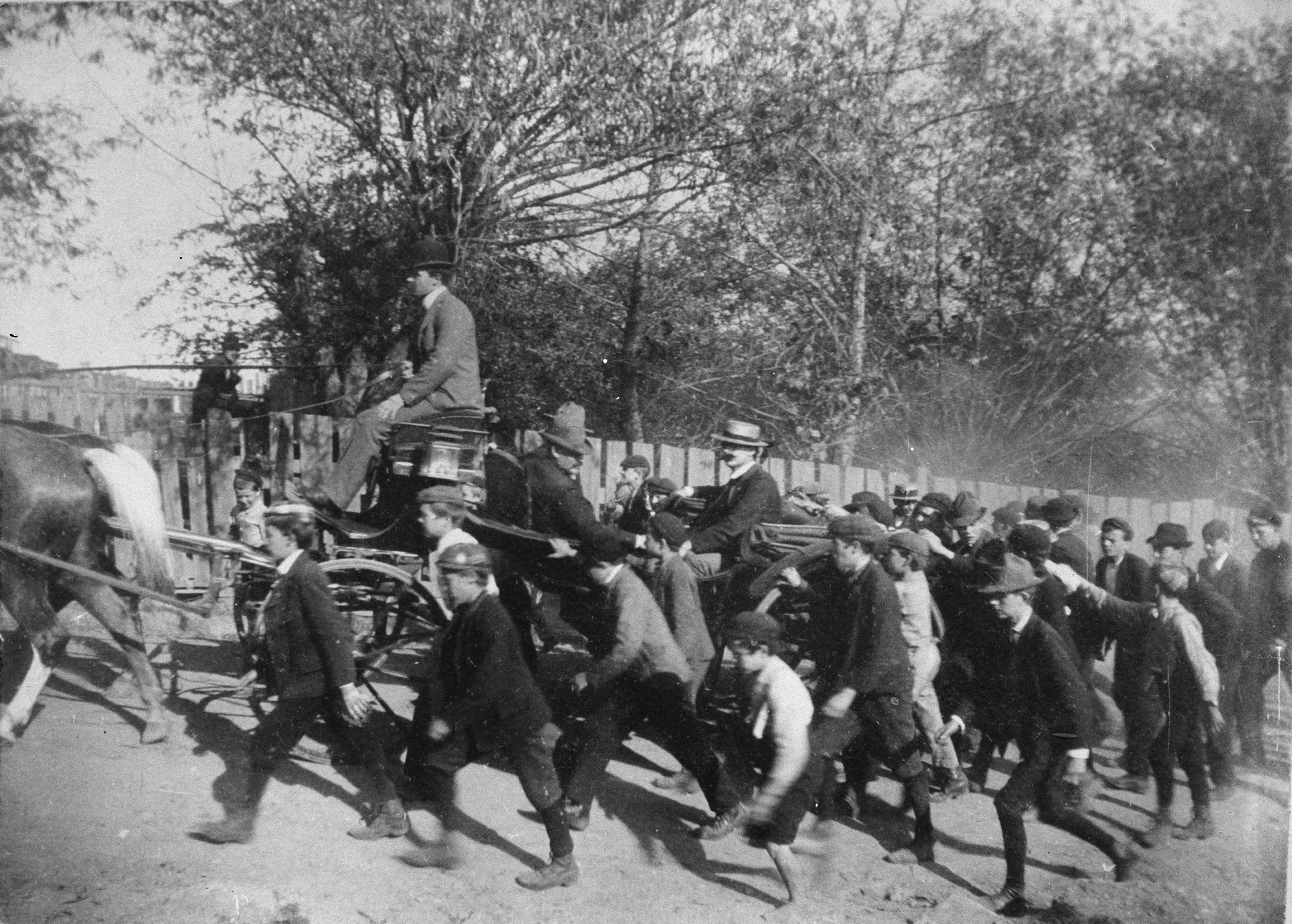
- John Mitchell, President of the UMWA, arriving in Shenandoah surrounded by a crowd of breaker boys.
- Date: May 12 – October 23, 1902
- Location: Pennsylvania, United States
- Goals: Eight-hour workday, higher wages, and union recognition
- Methods: Striking
- Result: Nine-hour workday (reduced from ten) wage increase of 10% first strike settled by federal arbitration

Parties
United Mine Workers of America (UMWA); Mine workers	Anthracite coal operators Reading Railroad; Coal and Iron Police; Strikebreakers; Penn. National Guard

Lead figures
John Mitchell; President of UMWA	George Baer; President of Reading Railroad/ Speaker for coal operators J.P. Morgan; Owner of Reading Railroad; William A. Stone; Governor of Pennsylvania

Number
100,000+	
- Settlement arbitrated by Theodore Roosevelt's administration

The Coal strike of 1902 (also known as the anthracite coal strike) was a strike by the United Mine Workers of America in the anthracite coalfields of eastern Pennsylvania. Miners struck for higher wages, shorter workdays, and the recognition of their union. The strike threatened to shut down the winter fuel supply to major American cities. At that time, residences were typically heated with anthracite or "hard" coal, which produces higher heat value and less smoke than "soft" or bituminous coal.

The strike never resumed, as the miners received a 10 percent wage increase and reduced workdays from ten to nine hours; the owners got a higher price for coal and did not recognize the trade union as a bargaining agent. It was the first labor dispute in which the U.S. federal government and President Theodore Roosevelt intervened as a neutral arbitrator.

== The 1899 and 1900 strikes ==
The United Mine Workers of America (UMWA) had won a sweeping victory in the 1897 strike by the soft-coal (bituminous coal) miners in the Midwest, winning significant wage increases. It grew from 10,000 to 115,000 members. A number of small strikes took place in the anthracite district from 1899 to 1901, by which the labor union gained experience and unionized more workers. The 1899 strike in Nanticoke, Pennsylvania, demonstrated that the unions could win a strike directed against a subsidiary of one of the large railroads.

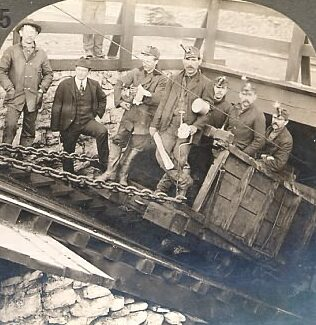
Coal miners in Hazleton, Pennsylvania, in 1900.

It hoped to make similar gains in 1900, but found the operators, who had established an oligopoly through concentration of ownership after drastic fluctuations in the market for anthracite, to be far more determined opponents than it had anticipated. The owners refused to meet or to arbitrate with the union. The union struck on September 17, 1900, with results that surprised even the union, as miners of all different nationalities and ethnicities walked out in support of the union.

Republican Party Senator Mark Hanna from Ohio, himself an owner of bituminous coal mines (not involved in the strike), sought to resolve the strike as it occurred less than two months before the presidential election. He worked through the National Civic Federation which brought labor and capital representatives together. Relying on J. P. Morgan to convey his message to the industry that a strike would hurt the reelection of Republican William McKinley, Hanna convinced the owners to concede a wage increase and grievance procedure to the strikers. The industry refused, on the other hand, to formally recognize the UMWA as the representative of the workers. The union declared victory and dropped its demand for union recognition.

== The anthracite coal strike ==
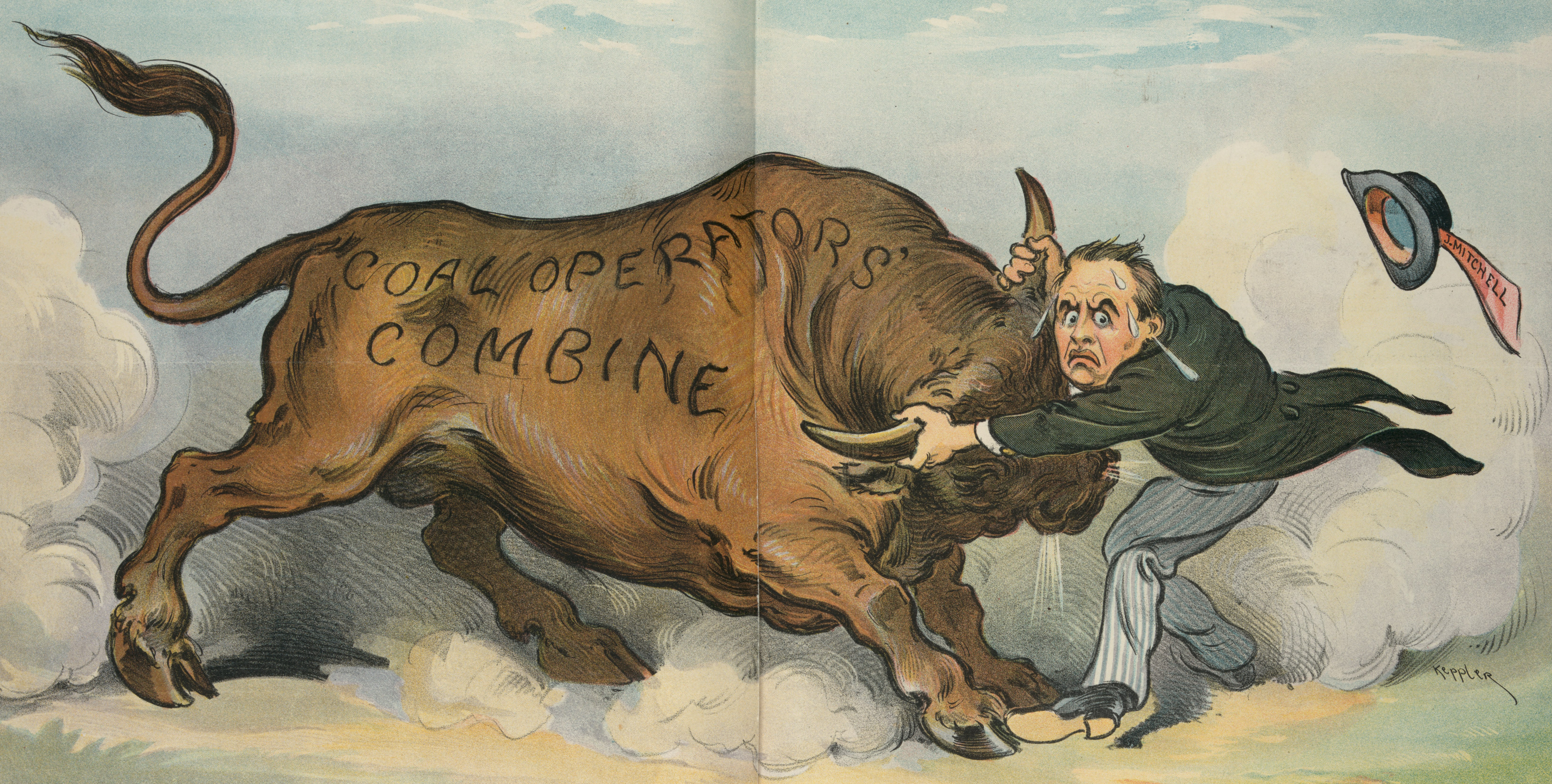
John Mitchell, President of the UMWA, takes the bull (coal trusts) by the horns.

The issues that led to the strike of 1900 were just as pressing in 1902: the union wanted recognition and a degree of control over the industry. The industry, still smarting from its concessions in 1900, opposed any federal role. The 150,000 miners wanted their weekly pay envelope. Tens of millions of city dwellers needed coal to heat their homes.

John Mitchell, President of the UMWA, proposed mediation through the National Civic Federation, then a body of relatively progressive employers committed to collective bargaining as a means of resolving labor disputes. In the alternative, Mitchell proposed that a committee of eminent clergymen report on conditions in the coalfields. George Baer, President of the Philadelphia and Reading Railroad, one of the leading employers in the industry, brushed aside both proposals dismissively:

Anthracite mining is a business, and not a religious, sentimental, or academic proposition.... I could not if I would delegate this business management to even so highly a respectable body as the Civic Federation, nor can I call to my aid . . . the eminent prelates you have named.

On May 12, 1902, the anthracite miners voting in Scranton, Pennsylvania, went out on strike. The maintenance employees, who had much steadier jobs and did not face the special dangers of underground work, walked out on June 2. The union had the support of roughly eighty percent of the workers in this area, or more than 100,000 strikers. Some 30,000 left the region, many headed for Midwestern bituminous mines. 10,000 men returned to Europe. The strike soon produced threats of violence between the strikers on one side and strikebreakers, the Pennsylvania National Guard, local police, and hired detective agencies on the other.

== Federal intervention ==
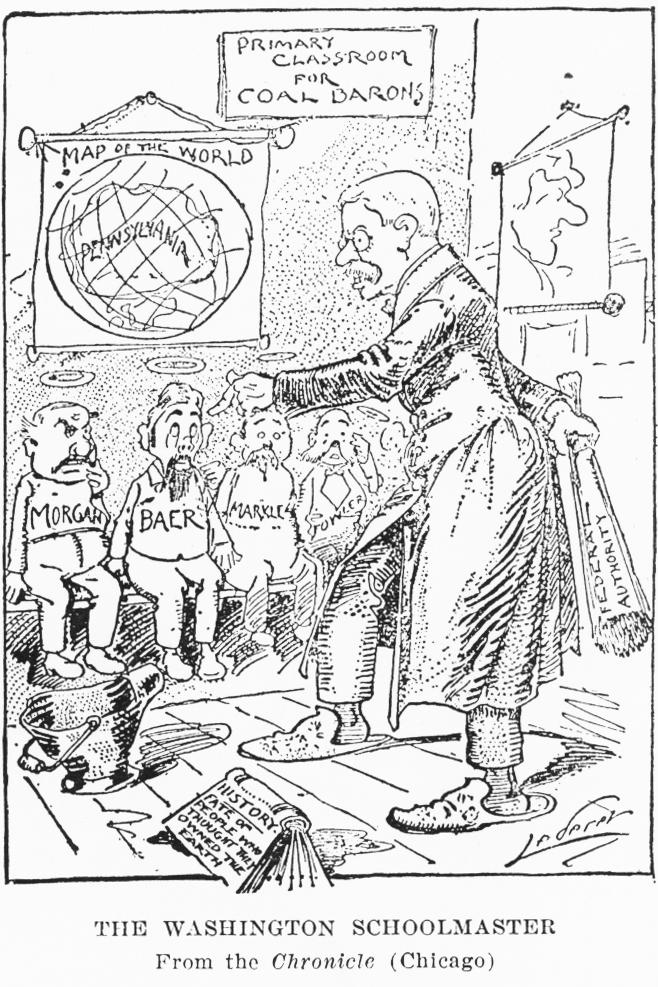
Theodore Roosevelt teaches the childish coal barons a lesson. 1902 cartoon by Charles Lederer

On June 8, President Theodore Roosevelt asked his Commissioner of Labor, Carroll D. Wright, to investigate the strike. Wright investigated and proposed reforms that acknowledged each side's position, recommending a nine-hour day on an experimental basis and limited collective bargaining. Roosevelt chose not to release the report, for fear of appearing to side with the union.

The owners refused to negotiate with the union. As George Baer wrote when urged to make concessions to the strikers and their union, the "rights and interests of the laboring man will be protected and cared for—not by the labor agitators, but by the Christian men to whom God in His infinite wisdom has given the control of the property interests of the country." The union used this letter to sway public opinion in favor of the strike.

Roosevelt wanted to intervene, but he was told by his Attorney General, Philander Knox, that he had no authority to do so. Hanna and many others in the Republican Party were likewise concerned about the political implications if the strike dragged on into winter, when the need for anthracite was greatest. As Roosevelt told Hanna, "A coal famine in the winter is an ugly thing and I fear we shall see terrible suffering and grave disaster."

Roosevelt convened a conference of representatives of government, labor, and management on October 3, 1902. The union considered the mere holding of a meeting to be tantamount to union recognition and took a conciliatory tone. The owners told Roosevelt that strikers had killed over 20 men and that he should use the power of government "to protect the man who wants to work, and his wife and children when at work." With proper protection, the owner said that they would produce enough coal to end the fuel shortage. They refused to enter into any negotiations with the union.

The governor sent in the National Guard, who protected the mines and the minority of men still working. Roosevelt attempted to persuade the union to end the strike with a promise that he would create a commission to study the causes of the strike and propose a solution, which Roosevelt promised to support with all of the authority of his office. Mitchell refused and his membership endorsed his decision by a nearly unanimous vote.

The economics of coal revolved around two factors: most of the cost of production was wages for miners, and if the supply fell, the price would shoot up. In an age before the use of oil and electricity, there were no good substitutes. Profits were low in 1902 because of an over supply; therefore the owners welcomed a moderately long strike. They had huge stockpiles which increased daily in value. It was illegal for the owners to conspire to shut down production, but not so if the miners went on strike. The owners welcomed the strike, but they adamantly refused to recognize the union, because they feared the union would control the coal industry by manipulating strikes.

Roosevelt continued to try to build support for a mediated solution, persuading former president Grover Cleveland to join the commission he was creating. He also considered nationalizing the mines under the leadership of John M. Schofield. This would put the U.S. Army in control of the coalfields to "run the mines as a receiver", Roosevelt wrote.

== J.P. Morgan intervenes ==
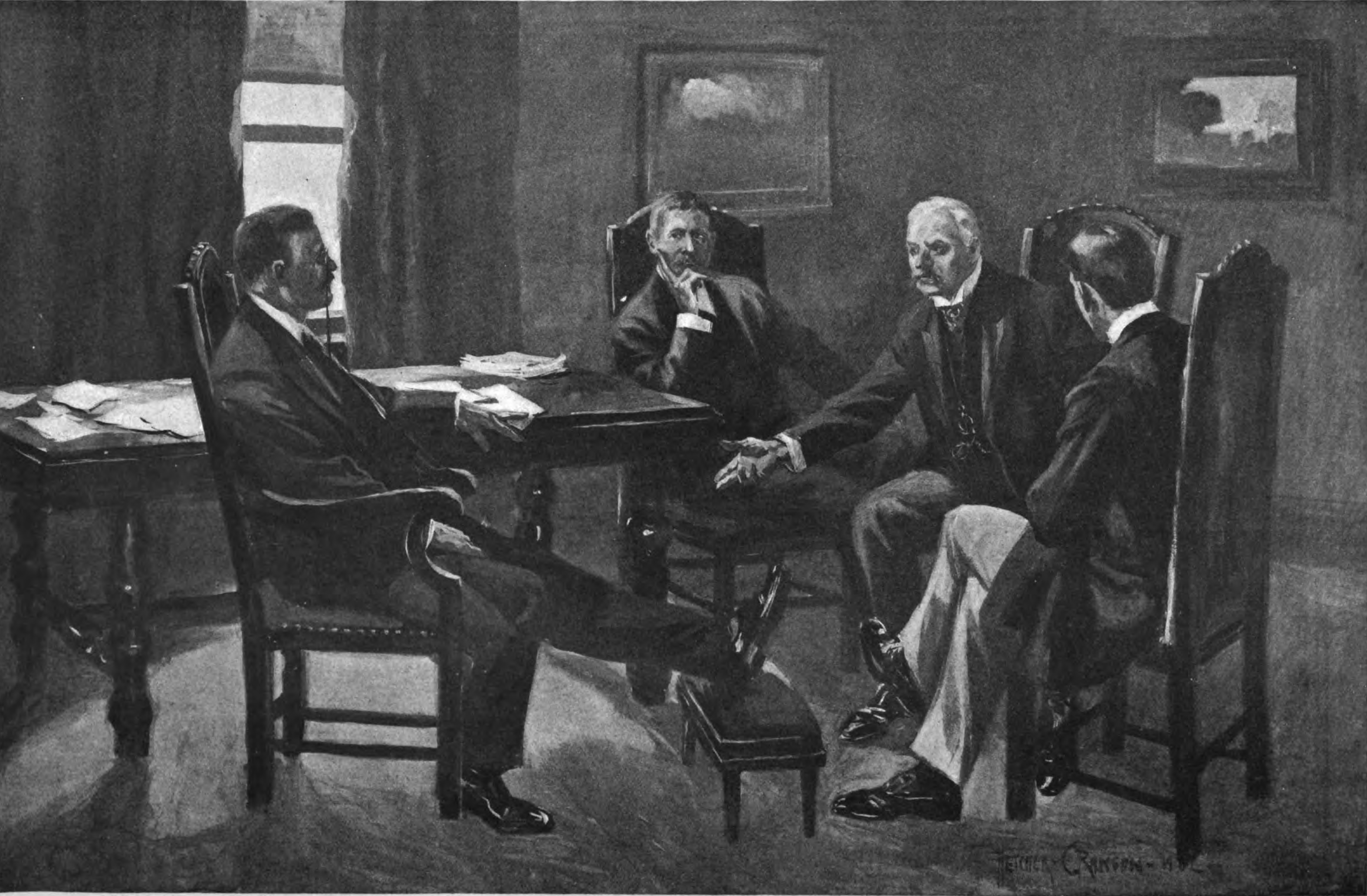
Theodore Roosevelt and J.P. Morgan have a meeting where they agree on a resolution for the strike.

J.P. Morgan, the dominant figure in American finance, had played a role in resolving the 1900 strike. He was deeply involved in this strike as well: his interests included the Reading Railroad, one of the largest employers of miners. He had installed George Baer, who spoke for the industry throughout the strike, as the head of the railroad.

At the urging of Secretary of War Elihu Root, Morgan came up with another compromise proposal that provided for arbitration, while giving the industry the right to deny that it was bargaining with the union by directing that each employer and its employees communicate directly with the commission. The employers agreed on the condition that the five members be a military engineer, a mining engineer, a judge, an expert in the coal business, and an "eminent sociologist". The employers were willing to accept a union leader as the "eminent sociologist," so Roosevelt named E. E. Clark, head of the railway conductors' union, as the "eminent sociologist." After Catholic leaders exerted pressure, he added a sixth member, Catholic bishop John Lancaster Spalding, and Commissioner Wright as the seventh member.

== Anthracite Coal Strike Commission ==
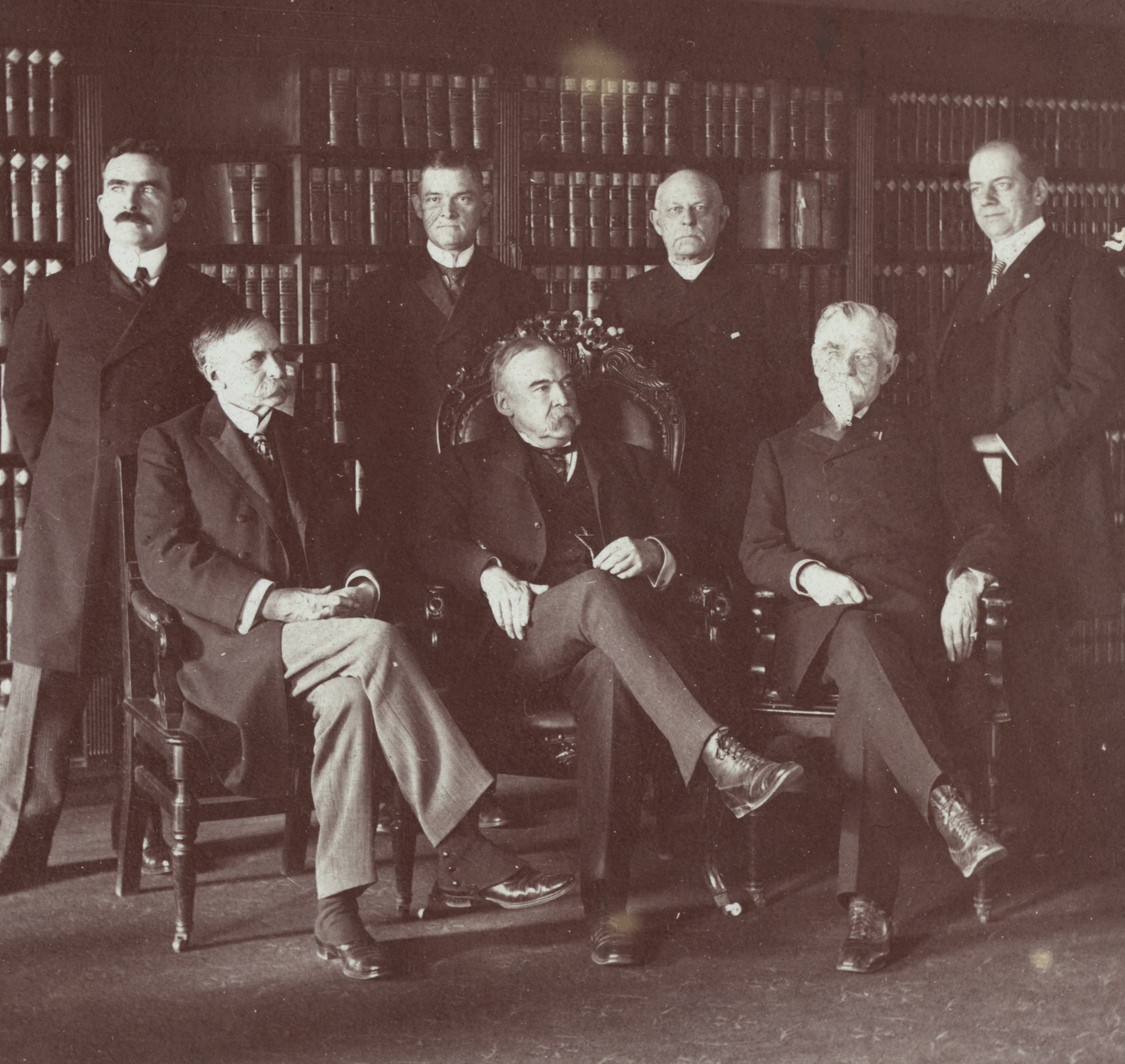
The commission appointed by Roosevelt to resolve the dispute, photographed by William H. Rau

The anthracite strike ended, after 163 days, on October 23, 1902. The commissioners began work the next day, then spent a week touring the coal regions. Wright used the staff of the Department of Labor to collect data about the cost of living in the coalfields.

The commissioners held hearings in Scranton over the next three months, taking testimony from 558 witnesses, including 240 for the striking miners, 153 for nonunion mineworkers, 154 for the operators, and eleven called by the Commission itself. Baer made the closing arguments for the coal operators, while lawyer Clarence Darrow closed for the workers.

Although the commissioners heard some evidence of terrible conditions, they concluded that the "moving spectacle of horrors" represented only a small number of cases. By and large, social conditions in mine communities were found to be good, and miners were judged as only partly justified in their claim that annual earnings were not sufficient "to maintain an American standard of living."

Baer said in his closing arguments, "These men don't suffer. Why, hell, half of them don't even speak English". Darrow, for his part, summed up the pages of testimony of mistreatment he had obtained in the soaring rhetoric for which he was famous: "We are working for democracy, for humanity, for the future, for the day will come too late for us to see it or know it or receive its benefits, but which will come, and will remember our struggles, our triumphs, our defeats, and the words which we spake."

In the end, the rhetoric of both sides made little difference to the commission, which split the difference between mineworkers and mine owners. The miners asked for 20% wage increases, and most were given a 10% increase. The miners had asked for an eight-hour day and were awarded a nine-hour day instead of the standard ten hours then prevailing. While the operators refused to recognize the United Mine Workers, they were required to agree to a six-man arbitration board, made up of equal numbers of labor and management representatives, with the power to settle labor disputes. Mitchell considered that de facto recognition and called it a victory.

== Aftermath of the strike ==
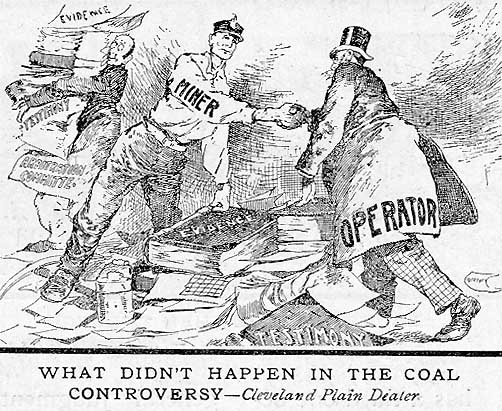
The two sides were supposed to listen to expert testimony and come to a friendly agreement. Cartoon from the Cleveland Plain Dealer

John Mitchell wrote that eight men died during the five months, "three or four" of them strikers or sympathizers. During the extensive arbitration testimony, after company owners made claims that the strikers had killed 21 men, Mitchell disagreed strongly and offered to resign his position if they could name the men and show proof.

The first casualty occurred July 1. An immigrant striker named Anthony Giuseppe was found fatally shot near a Lehigh Valley Coal Company colliery in Old Forge. It was thought the Coal and Iron Police guarding the site shot blindly through a fence. Street fighting in Shenandoah, Pennsylvania on July 30 between a mob of 5,000 striking miners versus police resulted in the beating death of Joseph Beddall, a merchant and the brother of the deputy sheriff.

Contemporary reporting describes three other deaths and widespread shooting injuries among strikers and Shenandoah police. On October 9, a striker named William Durham was shot and killed in Brownsville, Pennsylvania, near Shenandoah. He'd been loitering near the half-dynamited house of a non-union worker and disobeyed an order to halt. The legality of that killing under martial law became a case, Commonwealth v. Shortall, that was taken to the Supreme Court of Pennsylvania.

The behavior and private role of the Coal and Iron Police during the strike led to the formation of the Pennsylvania State Police, on May 2, 1905, as Senate Bill 278 was signed into law by Governor Samuel W. Pennypacker. The two forces operated in parallel until 1931.

Organized labor celebrated the outcome as a victory for the UMWA and American Federation of Labor unions generally. Membership in other unions soared, as moderates argued they could produce concrete benefits for workers much sooner than radical Socialists who planned to overthrow capitalism in the future. Mitchell proved his leadership skills and mastery of the problems of ethnic, skill, and regional divisions that had long plagued the union in the anthracite region.

By contrast, the strikes of the radical Western Federation of Miners in the West often turned into full-scale warfare between strikers and both employers and the civil and military authorities. This strike was successfully mediated through the intervention of the federal government, which strove to provide a "Square Deal"—which Roosevelt took as the motto for his administration—to both sides. The settlement was an important step in the Progressive Era reforms of the decade that followed. There were no more major coal strikes until the 1920s.

== In popular culture ==
The strike is mentioned in the Star Trek: Deep Space Nine episode "Bar Association", where the character Miles O'Brien states that his ancestor was a union leader killed in the strike.

== See also ==
- UMW Coal strike (1919)
- UMW General coal strike (1922)
- History of coal mining in the United States
- Lackawanna County Courthouse and John Mitchell Monument
- List of worker deaths in United States labor disputes
- Presidency of Theodore Roosevelt

== Bibliography ==
- Akin, William E. "The Catholic Church and Unionism, 1886-1902: A Study of Institutional Adjustment." Studies in History and Society. 3:1 (1970): 14–24.
- Aurand, Harold W. Coalcracker Culture: Work and Values in Pennsylvania Anthracite, 1835-1935. Selinsgrove, Pa.: Susquehanna University Press, 2003. ISBN 1-57591-064-0
- Blatz, Perry K. Democratic Miners: Work and Labor Relations in the Anthracite Coal Industry, 1875-1925. Albany, N.Y.: State University of New York Press, 1994. ISBN 0-7914-1819-7
- Blatz, Perry K. "Local Leadership and Local Militancy: The Nanticoke Strike of 1899 and the Roots of Unionization in the Northern Anthracite Fields." Pennsylvania History. 58:4 (October 1991): 278–297.
- Cornell, Robert J. The Anthracite Coal Strike of 1902 (1957)
- Fox, Mayor. United We Stand: The United Mine Workers of America 1890-1990 (UMW 1990), pp 89–101 semiofficial union history
- George, J.E. "The Coal Miners' Strike of 1897," Quarterly Journal of Economics Vol. 12, No. 2 (Jan., 1898), pp. 186–208 in JSTOR
- Gowaskie, Joe. "John Mitchell and the Anthracite Mine Workers: Leadership Conservatism and Rank-and-File Militancy." Labor History. 27:1 (1985–1986): 54–83.
- Greene, Victor R. "A Study in Slavs, Strikes and Unions: The Anthracite Strike of 1897." Pennsylvania History. 31:2 (April 1964): 199–215.
- Grossman, Jonathan. "The Coal Strike of 1902 – Turning Point in U.S. Policy." Monthly Labor Review. October 1975. Available online.
- Harbaugh, William. The Life and Times of Theodore Roosevelt. (2nd ed. 1963)
- Janosov, Robert A., et al. The Great Strike: Perspectives on the 1902 Anthracite Coal Strike. Easton, Pa.: Canal History and Technology Press, 2002. ISBN 0-930973-28-3
- Morris, Edmund. Theodore Rex. (Random House, 2001). ISBN 0-394-55509-0; biography of TR as President
- Perry, Peter R. "Theodore Roosevelt and the labor movement" (MA thesis California State University, Hayward; 1991) online; ch 1 on strike.
- Phelan, Craig. "The Making of a Labor Leader: John Mitchell and the Anthracite Strike of 1900." Pennsylvania History. 63:1 (January 1996): 53–77.
- Phelan, Craig. Divided Loyalties: The Public and Private Life of Labor Leader John Mitchell. Albany, N.Y.: State University of New York Press, 1994. ISBN 0-7914-2087-6
- Virtue, George O. "The Anthracite Miners' Strike of 1900," Journal of Political Economy, vol. 9, no. 1 (Dec. 1900), pp. 1–23. online free in JSTOR.
- Warne, Frank Julian. "The Anthracite Coal Strike." Annals of the American Academy of Political and Social Science (1901) 17#1 pp 15–52. online free in JSTOR
- Wiebe, Robert H. "The Anthracite Coal Strike of 1902: A Record of Confusion." Mississippi Valley Historical Review. September 1961, pp. 229–51. in JSTOR
- Wilson, Susan E. "President Theodore Roosevelt's Role in the Anthracite Coal Strike of 1902." Labor's Heritage. 3:1 (1991): 4–2.

== Primary sources ==
- United States Anthracite Coal Strike Commission, Report to the President on the Anthracite Coal Strike of May–October, 1902 online edition

== Music ==
- Byrne, Jerry, and George Gershon Korson. On Johnny Mitchell's Train. Library of Congress, 1947. Audio. https://www.loc.gov/item/ihas.200197134/.
