= George Frederick Baer =

American lawyer

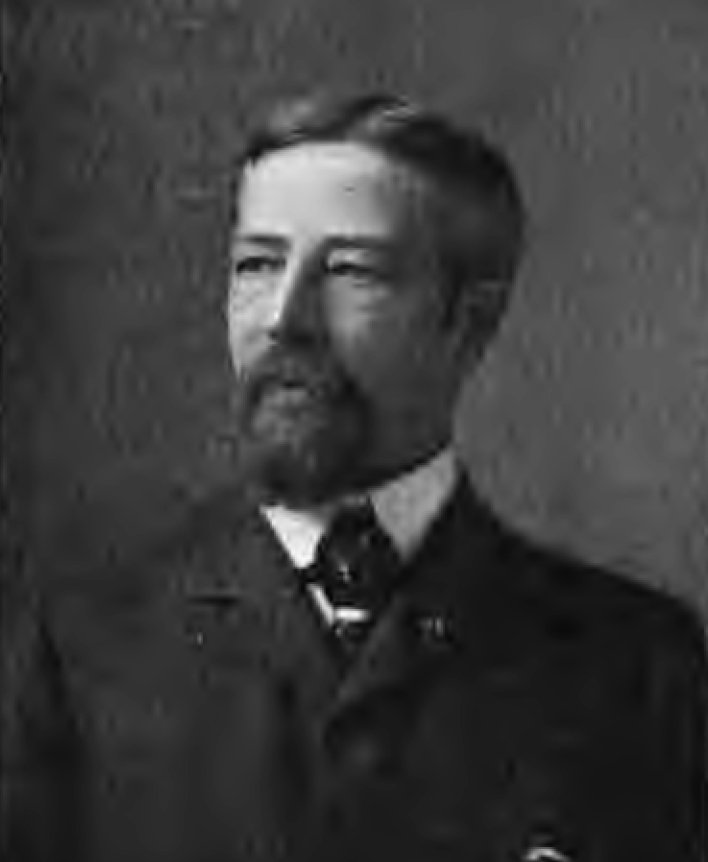
- George F. Baer circa 1904
- Born: September 26, 1842; Lavansville, Pennsylvania
- Died: April 26, 1914 (aged 71); Philadelphia, Pennsylvania
- Occupations: Lawyer, railroad executive
- Years active: 1870-1914
- Known for: President of Philadelphia and Reading Railroad
- Spouse: Emily Kimmel

George Frederick Baer (September 26, 1842 – April 26, 1914) was an American lawyer who was the President of the Philadelphia and Reading Railroad and spokesman for the owners during the Anthracite Coal Strike of 1902.

== Biography ==
George Baer was born in Lavansville, Somerset County, Pennsylvania, and attended the Somerset Institute and Somerset Academy for a high school education. At the age of thirteen, Baer dropped out of school and became a "printer's devil" at a local newspaper, the Somerset Democrat, and later attended Franklin and Marshall College. He and his brother acquired the Democrat in 1861, and in 1862 he raised a company of volunteers for the Union Army during the American Civil War. In the 133rd Pennsylvania Volunteers, Baer served as a captain at the battles of Antietam, Fredericksburg, and Chancellorsville.

Baer studied law and was admitted to the bar in 1864. He moved to Reading, Pennsylvania, in 1868 and established a law practice. He was later hired by the Philadelphia and Reading Railroad as their counsel. He was elected to the American Philosophical Society in 1898.

In 1901, Baer was installed by financier J. P. Morgan as the president of the Reading Railroad after the retirement of his predecessor, Joseph Smith Harris. Soon thereafter, Baer was confronted with the Coal Strike of 1902 in the anthracite coal fields of eastern Pennsylvania, the largest united strike of the United Mine Workers. The Reading was a major employer in the region, and Baer refused to put down the strike or speak to the strikers, citing Social Darwinist ideas. Baer's attitude was released into the papers and became an example of arrogance and superiority. Finally, President Theodore Roosevelt intervened and established an independent commission that gave the workers a raise, but refused to formally recognize their Union striking workers.

Baer's statements on workers and labor relations became rallying cries for the unions. Most famously he wrote in a letter, later leaked to the press, "The rights and interests of the laboring man will be protected and cared for -- not by the labor agitators, but by the Christian men of property to whom God has given control of the property rights of the country, and upon the successful management of which so much depends." In closing statements on behalf of the coal managers to the government's Anthracite Coal Commission he stated, on the subject of working conditions, "These men don't suffer. Why, hell, half of them don't even speak English."

Baer was also named the president of Franklin and Marshall College in 1894 and retained the post until he died in 1914. He married Emily Kimmel in 1866 and had five daughters.

== See also ==
- List of railroad executives
