= Jonathan Grossman =

English professor (born 1967)

Jonathan Hamilton Grossman (born April 17, 1967) is a professor of English at the University of California, Los Angeles (UCLA). He specializes in nineteenth-century British literature.

== Biography ==
Grossman was born in Oxford, England, in 1967. He attended Milton Academy in Milton, Massachusetts. He received his Bachelor of Arts in English and religion from Brown University in 1989, and his PhD in English from the University of Pennsylvania in 1996.

== Scholarship ==
Grossman's first book, The Art of Alibi: English Law Courts and the Novel, was published by The Johns Hopkins University Press in 2002. The book examines early nineteenth-century crime fiction's relation to the law courts prior to detective fiction's invention in the 1840s. It falls into the interdisciplinary field of law and literature as well as early Victorian studies.

Charles Dickens's Networks: Public Transport and the Novel (Oxford), his second book, examines the history of public transport's systematic networking of people and how this revolutionized perceptions of time, space, and community, and how the art form of the novel played a special role in synthesizing and understanding that revolution. Focusing on a trio of road novels by Charles Dickens, this study looks first at a key historical moment in the networked community's coming together, then at a subsequent recognition of its tragic limits, and, finally, at the construction of a revised view that expressed the precarious, limited omniscient perspective by which passengers came to imagine their journeying in the network.

In 2026, Grossman published Standardization (Standardisation): A Literary History (Chicago). This study looks at the history of standardizing objects through the media of standardizing them. Grossman explains the print history that led to the standards document, such as those produced in great number by the International Organization for Standardization. The book also looks to nineteenth-century novels to understand how people came to view their subjectivity in a world where identical, interchangeable manufactured objects proliferated.

Since 2011, Grossman has been co-editor of the journal Nineteenth-Century Literature.

Grossman's academic interests include the history, form, and sociology of the novel, technology, and narrative and temporality.
