= Frank Julian Warne =

American journalist, economist and statistician

Frank Julian Warne (1874–1948) was an American journalist, economist and statistician. He is best known for his book The Slav Invasion and the Mine Workers and other publications on immigration and industrial relations. Warne also published on statistics, transport and cartography.

Warne was born 16 March 1874 in Parkersburg/WV to William H. Warne and Rosalie de Alberts (Warren). After Parkersburg High School, he studied journalism, finance and economy at the University of Pennsylvania from 1896, where he received his MA in 1899 and his PhD in Economy in 1902.

Before his studies, Warne was a reporter for the Parkersburg Daily Sentinel from 1892 to 1894, and as a student for the Philadelphia Public Ledger from 1896 to 1902. From 1903 to 1906 he was editor of Railway World of Philadelphia. In 1904 Warne published his most noted work, The Slav Invasion and the Mine Workers.

In 1906, Warne became secretary of the immigration department of the National Civic Federation of New York. In 1910 he was executive secretary of the New York State Immigration Commission. In 1911 he served as an expert for the US Census Bureau. He was statistician for the US board of arbitration in 1912 and economist for railroad brotherhoods in arbitration of wage disputes starting the same year. In 1918, Warne was chief statistician of the Emergency Fleet Corporation of the US Shipping Board and in 1919 he became manager of industrial relations of the US Housing Corporation.

Member of the American Academy of Political and Social Science, Authors' Club, London, and Beta Theta Pi.

== Publications ==
- The Coal-Mine Workers: A Study in Labor Organizations. Longmans, Green. 1905.
- The Slav Invasion and the Mine Workers: A Study in Immigration. J.B. Lippincott. 1904.
- Immigration and the Southern States, 1905.
- Facts on Immigration, 1907.
- Railway Operation and Finance, 1913.
- The Immigrant Invasion. New York: Dodd, Mead. 1913.
- The Tide of Immigration. D. Appleton. 1916.
- Warne's Book of Charts, 1917.
- Chartography in Ten Lessons. Washington: Warne. 1919.
- Industrial Relations, 1920.
- The Workers at Work, 1920.
- "Elements in an Immigration Policy for the United States," Annals of the American Academy of Political and Social Science, 1921.
