= Charles Lederer (cartoonist) =

American cartoonist

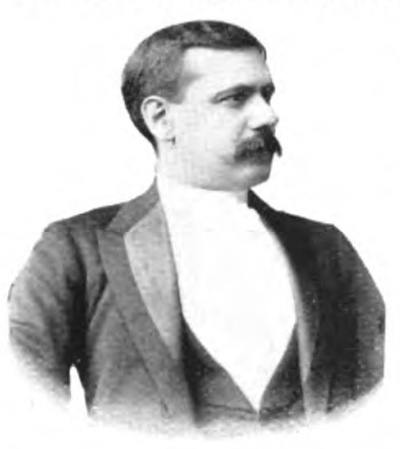
- Born: December 31, 1856; Lowell, Massachusetts
- Died: December 13, 1925 (aged 68)

Charles Lederer (December 31, 1856 – December 13, 1925) was an American editorial cartoonist and illustrator, associated for many years with the Chicago Herald. He was known in the late 19th century as the highest paid newspaper artist in the country. Lederer was born in Lowell, Massachusetts, son of John and Bettina Lederer. At age 14 he was apprenticed to an engraver in New York City, and after a year rented a studio with artist Henry Lovie (1829–1875). His first illustration work was designing valentines. From 1875 his illustrations appeared in such publications as Leslie's Weekly, Harper's, and the New York World. He moved to Chicago in 1877, and worked as book publisher, designer, and illustrator. He began illustrating daily papers there in 1883. He was also a writer, and illustrator of children's books. He married Bertha Adele Mitchell on September 29, 1907.
