= Cortelyou =

Cortelyou is a surname. Notable people with the surname include:

- Ethaline Hartge Cortelyou (1909–1997), American chemist
- Jacques Cortelyou (c. 1625–1693), Surveyor General of New Netherland
- George B. Cortelyou (1862–1940), first US Secretary of Commerce and Labor and later Secretary of the Treasury
- Philip Cortelyou Johnson (1906–2005), American architect

== See also ==
- Cortelyou, Alabama
- Cortelyou Road (BMT Brighton Line), a rapid-transit station in Brooklyn, New York
