= Cetus =

Cetus may refer to:

- Cetus (constellation), a constellation straddling the celestial equator
- Cetus (mythology), the monster sent to devour Andromeda which was slain by Perseus
- The former biotechnology company Cetus Corporation
- Project Cetus, crewless submarine being developed by the United Kingdom
- "-cetus", a suffix used to describe whales in taxonomy.
- Cetus, a settlement on Earth in the online game Warframe that hosts the Ostrons, a civilization of human traders
- USS Cetus, a Crater-class cargo ship in the United States Navy in World War II
