= Henry Clay Payne =

American politician (1843–1904)

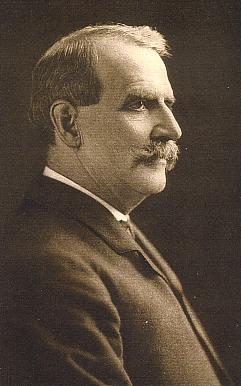

Chair of the Republican National Committee Acting
- In office February 15, 1904 – June 23, 1904
- Preceded by: Mark Hanna
- Succeeded by: George B. Cortelyou

40th United States Postmaster General
- In office January 9, 1902 – October 4, 1904
- President: Theodore Roosevelt
- Preceded by: Charles Smith
- Succeeded by: Robert Wynne

Personal details
- Born: Henry Clay Payne; November 23, 1843 Ashfield, Massachusetts, U.S.
- Died: October 4, 1904 (aged 60) Washington, D.C., U.S.
- Resting place: Forest Home Cemetery; Milwaukee, Wisconsin, U.S.
- Party: Republican
- Spouse: Lydia W. Van Dyke (m. 1867)
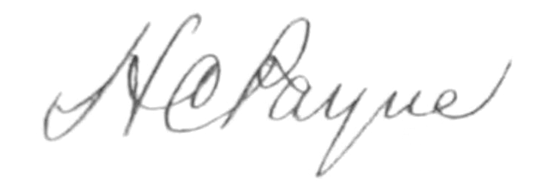
- Signature

Henry Clay Payne (November 23, 1843 – October 4, 1904) was U.S. postmaster general from 1902 until his death under President Theodore Roosevelt. He served as chairman of the Republican National Committee.

== Early life ==
Payne was born on November 23, 1843, in Ashfield, Franklin County, Massachusetts, to Elizabeth (née Ames) and Orrin P. Payne. He attended common schools and an academy. He spent his youth in Massachusetts, and attempted to enlist for the Union Army, but he was rejected from service due to poor health. In 1859, he was graduated from the Academy of Shelburne Falls. In 1863, he moved to Milwaukee, Wisconsin, where he found work as a cashier in a dry goods merchant.

== Career ==
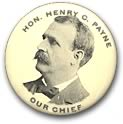
H.C. Payne button

In 1872 he began his political career with the Young Men's Republican Club of Milwaukee County. He worked his way up to become secretary and then chairman for the organization. In 1876, Payne was appointed by President Ulysses S. Grant as postmaster of Milwaukee, a position he held until 1886. He was president of Wisconsin Telephone Company in 1886, and served as director for the First National Bank of Milwaukee.

Payne was a delegate to the 1880, 1888, and 1892 Republican National Conventions. He joined the Republican National Committee in 1880 and he became vice chairman. Following the death of Mark Hanna, he became active chairman of the committee. He was secretary and chairman of the Republican State Committee from 1872 to 1892.

== Railroads ==
Payne became a lobbyist for the railroad industry, described by long-time opponent Robert La Follette, Sr. as “the most effective railroad lobbyist I ever knew.” Starting in 1890 he helped Henry Villard acquire all the cars Milwaukee streetcar system for Villard's North American Company of New Jersey. Villard created a new system that combined several of the earlier horsecar, steam dummy, and streetcar lines into one electric streetcar system, The Milwaukee Electric Railway and Light Company. Payne was its vice president and became the president of the Milwaukee and Northern Railroad in 1889 and other enterprises controlled by Villard. In his duties as vice-president of the Milwaukee Electric Railway and Light Company, Payne instituted free park concerts at many of Milwaukee's parks, including Lake Park, but fought Milwaukee's government in the courts and in the legislature. In 1893 he was elected president of the American Street Railway Association; and later in August 1893, he was appointed receiver for the bankrupt Northern Pacific Railway.

In 1896, Payne refused to provide a one-cent-an-hour pay raise which had allegedly been promised to unionized TMER&L workers. This set off a bitter strike and boycott; the company hired hundreds of scabs, and broke both the strike and the union, creating an adversarial relationship between TMER&L Co. and workers (including the city's powerful "sewer Socialists") for many years to come; the company would not be unionized again until after a 1934 strike. During this period, Payne continued to promulgate expanded streetcar and interurban services in the region, including a controversial 30-year extension of their franchise, a deal cut with Milwaukee Mayor David Rose and the Milwaukee Common Council under what some considered corrupt circumstances.

He also engaged in real estate development, such as the 1897 "Payne's Park Addition" to North Milwaukee, fed by expanded streetcar lines running past what has been described as "two miles of vacant fields" and ending a few blocks past the street Payne had named after Villard in 1892.

== Later career ==
Payne was appointed by President Theodore Roosevelt as U.S. postmaster general in January 1902.

== Personal life ==
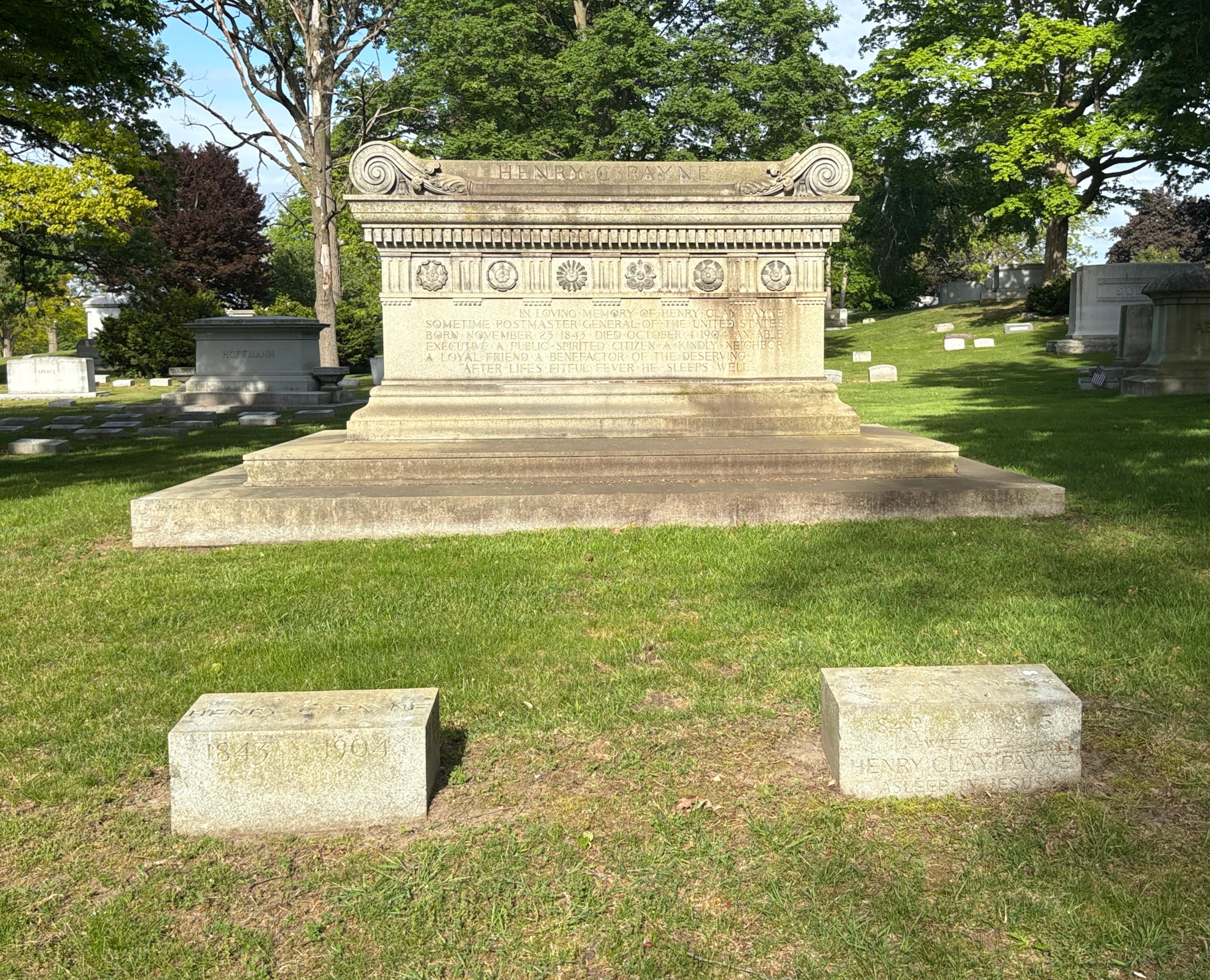
Payne's grave at Forest Home Cemetery

Payne married Lydia W. Van Dyke of New York in 1867. They lived on H Street in Washington, D.C., adjacent to Arlington Hotel.

Payne died on October 4, 1904, at his apartment near Arlington Hotel in Washington, D.C. He was buried in Forest Home Cemetery in Milwaukee, Wisconsin.

Party political offices
Preceded by Mark Hanna	Chair of the Republican National Committee; Acting; 1904	Succeeded by George B. Cortelyou
Political offices
Preceded by Charles Smith	United States Postmaster General; 1902–1904	Succeeded by Robert Wynne
