= Cortelyou, Alabama =

- Unincorporated community
- Location of Cortelyou in Alabama
- Coordinates: 31°25′25″N 88°00′30″W
- Country: United States
- State: Alabama
- County: Washington
- Elevation: 59 ft (18 m)
- Time zone: UTC-6 (Central (CST))
  - Summer (DST): UTC-5 (CDT)
- GNIS feature ID: 157925

Cortelyou, also known as Richardson or Richardson Station, is an unincorporated community in Washington County, Alabama, United States.

== History ==
Cortelyou was originally known as Richardson Station, but the Alabama Railroad Commission was petitioned by Richardson's citizens and the Southern Railway to move the location one quarter mile south and change the name to Cortelyou. This change took effect on March 4, 1907. The community was called Richardson in honor of John Richardson, Jr., an early settler of the area. It was then called Cortelyou in honor of George B. Cortelyou, who was then the United States Postmaster General. A post office operated under the name Richardson from 1898 to 1902, then under the name Cortelyou from 1906 to 1957.
