= Robert Wynne =

American politician (1851–1922)

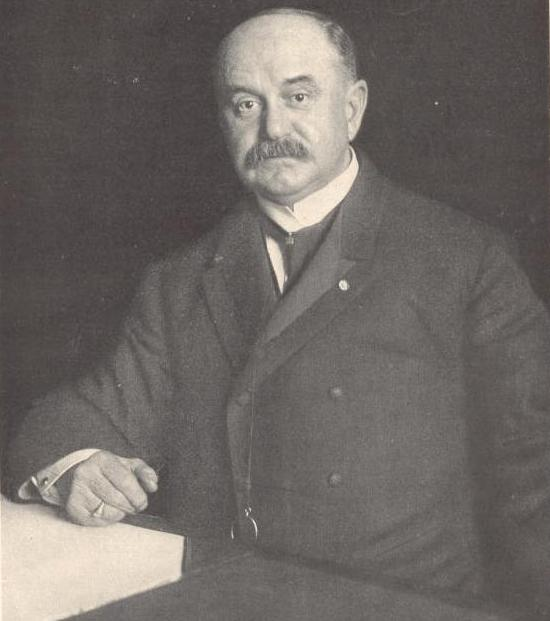

41st United States Postmaster General
- In office October 10, 1904 – March 5, 1905
- President: Theodore Roosevelt
- Preceded by: Henry C. Payne
- Succeeded by: George B. Cortelyou

Personal details
- Born: Robert John Wynne; November 18, 1851 New York City, U.S.
- Died: March 11, 1922 (aged 70) Washington, D.C., U.S.
- Party: Republican
- Spouse: Mary McCabe

Robert John Wynne (November 18, 1851 – March 11, 1922) was an American who served as United States Postmaster General from 1904 to 1905, and as Consul General at the American embassy in the United Kingdom from 1905 to 1910. He was also a distinguished and popular journalist for a number of newspapers and magazines in the late 1800s.

== Early life ==
Wynne was born in New York City in 1851. His father was a veteran of the Mexican–American War. He was educated in the city's public schools, but also had a number of private tutors. He was just 10 years old when the American Civil War broke out. He wanted to enlist, but was too young. His father served in the Civil War, however, and young Robert accompanied him to the front and saw several battles.

In 1870, Wynne became a telegraph operator for the Cincinnati Gazette, living part-time in Washington, D.C. He was hired at the request of General Henry V. Boynton, who led the paper's staff in D.C. and who wanted the very best telegraph operator he could find. That was Wynne. Wynne also lived part-time in Philadelphia, Pennsylvania, where he worked for the American Press Association. He also worked for the Pacific and Atlantic Telegraph Company, and became its chief telegrapher.

Boynton was so impressed with Wynne's work as a reporter that he encouraged him to abandon telegraphy and become a journalist full-time. In 1880, Wynne joined the Gazette as a full-time journalist. Boynton syndicated Wynne's work to a wide range of newspapers, including the St. Louis Democrat, Chicago Tribune, Pittsburgh Commercial, and Philadelphia Inquirer.

== Public service ==
In February 1893, Wynne became the private secretary to Secretary of the Treasury Charles Foster. After a change in presidential administrations in March 1893, he continued in the role for Secretary of the Treasury John G. Carlisle, but left public service in August 1893. He returned to journalism, this time working for the New York Press and the Cincinnati Tribune.

In 1902, President Theodore Roosevelt appointed Wynne to be First Assistant Postmaster General. He was not Roosevelt's first choice: That had been Indianapolis, Indiana, journalist Harry C. New, but New turned down the post. Wynne, too, was reluctant to take it, but Roosevelt pressured him and he accepted. In this role, Wynne uncovered extensive fraud in the department. He first became suspicious of illegal activity as a reporter, and his investigation as First Assistant Postmaster General led to many departmental resignations and prison time for a few people. The incumbent Postmaster General, Henry Clay Payne, died on October 4, 1904. Wynne was appointed Acting Postmaster General the next day, and named Postmaster General on October 10. He served until March 5, 1905.

Wynne was appointed Consul General at the Embassy of the United States in London on January 11, 1905, while still serving as Postmaster General. Incoming President William Howard Taft reaffirmed his posting, and he went to London on April 1, 1905. He resigned in May 1909. He remained in London for the next 19 months, representing various American businesses. In January 1910, Wynne was caught in the Stoats Nest railway disaster, in which eight people died.

== Business career ==
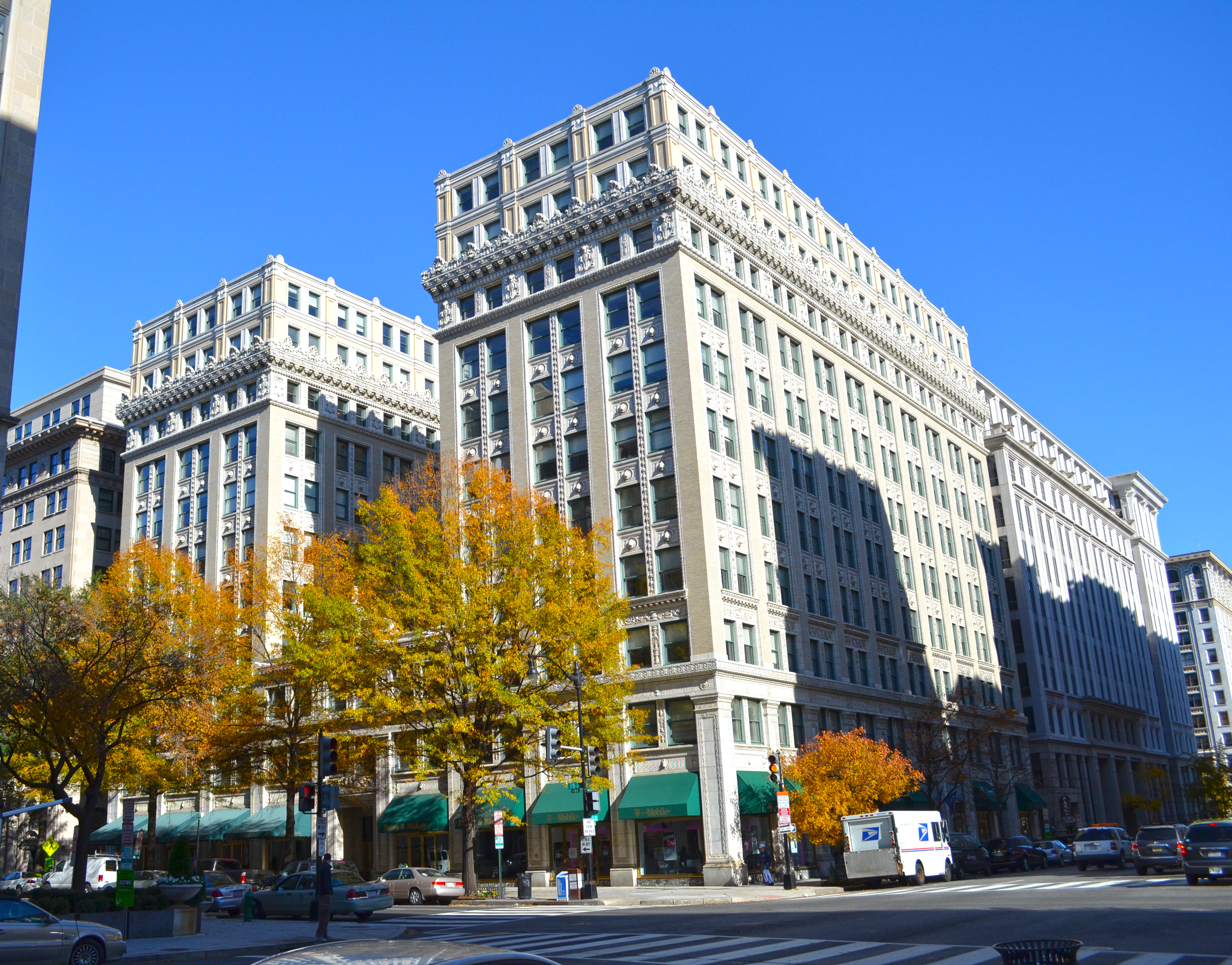
The Southern Building (shown in 2012), the source of much financial trouble for Robert Wynne

Returning to private life, Wynne was appointed president of the First National Fire Insurance Company when it formed in February 1912 through the merger of the Continental and Munsey insurance companies. In October 1912, First National Fire purchased a half-interest in the Southern Building at 15th and H Streets NW. Trust deeds of $800,000, $450,000, and $325,000 attached to the building. First National Fire was sued by its stockholders for incurring this debt. In January 1912, the company was the focus of a congressional investigation into fraud committed by insurance companies.

Wynne was ousted as president in April 1914 over the Southern Building acquisition. Suspicious that proxy votes had been withheld from the count, Wynne successfully sued to have personal mail which had been delivered to the company (and which the company had seized) returned to him. As he expected, many proxy votes had not been counted. When they were counted, Wynne was reelected president of the company on June 17, 1914.

The Commercial Fire Insurance Company of Baltimore, Maryland, the co-owner of the Southern Building, tried to force a merger with First National in August 1914. Wynne resisted the merger, and demanded that the Southern Building be partitioned so that First National could extricate itself from its business arrangements with Commercial Fire. The partition effort was unsuccessful, and in December 1914 Commercial Fire sold its interest in the structure. Commercial Fire went bankrupt days later.

On February 10, 1915, businessman William Tryson and others formed the Allan E. Walker Company to buy the Southern Building. Nine days later, First National Fire sold the building to the Walker Company for an undisclosed amount. This allowed the $450,000 and $325,000 trusts to be paid and released. On March 18, the Walker Company sold the building back to First National, incurring a trust deed of $600,000. This triggered more stockholder lawsuits, which argued that Wynne was attempting to hide the company's financial distress.

Although the stockholder suits were not successful, the reputation of First National Fire Insurance was severely damaged. On February 7, 1917, First National's stockholders approved the refinancing of the Southern Building. The structure was sold again to the Walker Company on February 14, and the Walker Company sold it back to First National on February 28 (now subject to a single trust deed of $900,000). On March 7, First National's board of directors agreed to form a new company—the Southern Realty Corporation, with Wynne as its president—to buy the Southern Building. On March 10, First National's shareholders were advised to trade their stock on a one-to-one basis for stock in the Southern Building, with any excess proceeds from the sale returning to First National stockholders as a dividend. On May 18, the Walker Company offered to buy the building for $1.8 million (to be paid with a first mortgage of $900,000, a second mortgage of $677,000, and the remainder by First National stockholders who wanted shares in the Walker Company). First National agreed to the Walker Co. sale, leading to a struggle for control of the Southern Building among the three entities.

First National filed for voluntary bankruptcy on August 13, 1917. Wynne continued as president of the Southern Realty Corporation, which remained solvent. The bankruptcy led to extensive litigation, as shareholders who did not invest in the Walker Company sued to recover their investment in First National and the Walker Company fought to gain ownership of the Southern Building from the Southern Realty Corporation. During this litigation, First National's title to the building was reaffirmed, First National's deal to sell the building to the Walker Company was annulled, the sale of the building by First National to Southern Realty affirmed, and tenants sued over skyrocketing rents at the building. Southern Realty's investors unsuccessfully sued in July 1920 to have Southern Realty declared bankrupt. Additional court hearings in late July 1920 led to the sale of the Southern Building to the Walker Company in late August 1920. With the Walker Company assuming full control by October, Southern Realty was liquidated in July 1921.

Wynne had long defended First National's financial health. The company's liquidation largely proved him correct: Few of the stockholders in First National lost money.

Wynne was also an incorporator, vice president, and director of the Washington and Southern Bank. He helped form the bank in April 1912, and remained with it until August 1913.

== Personal life ==
Wynne married Mary Ellen McCabe, daughter of a wealthy construction contractor. She died in October 1915 of a heart attack.

Wynne began suffering frail health from cardiac disease in 1919. Wynne died at his home at 1511 Park Road NW in Washington, D.C., from cardiac disease on March 11, 1922. A Catholic, he was interred at Mount Olivet Cemetery in Washington, D.C.

Wynne had several children: Charles J. Wynne (later a captain in the United States Army), Alice Wynne Semler, John S. Wynne, Ruth Austin Wynne Smith, Ida Marcella Wynne French, Robert Frank Wynne (a captain in the United States Marine Corps), and Henry B. Wynne. His sons Robert and Henry preceded him in death. Robert saw action in Cuba, the Philippines, and China (during the Boxer Rebellion), and died in March 1912 of tuberculosis contracted while in China.

== Memberships ==
Wynne was a member of the Military Order of the Loyal Legion of the United States (the "Loyal Legion"). He was also a member of the Gridiron Club, which he helped organize (and of which he was later president); the Army and Navy Club; the National Press Club, and the Columbia Country Club.

In February 1919, Wynne was named to the committee seeking to build a national memorial to Theodore Roosevelt.

Political offices
Preceded by Henry C. Payne	United States Postmaster General; Served under: Theodore Roosevelt; October 10, 1904 – March 5, 1905	Succeeded by George B. Cortelyou
