= USS Cetus =

Cargo ship of the United States Navy

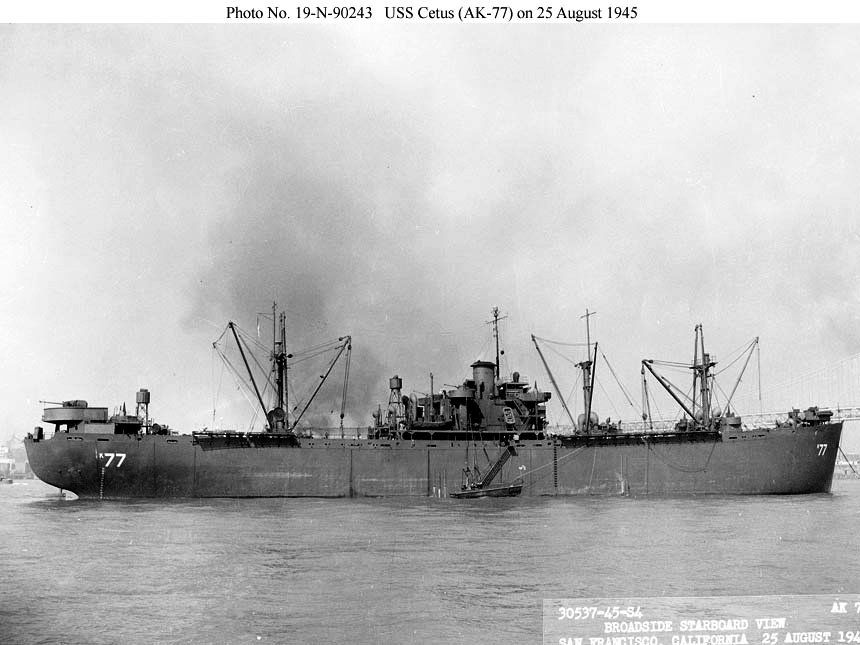
- USS Cetus (AK-77), at anchor in San Francisco Bay, 25 August 1945.

History

United States
- Name: George B. Cortelyou; Cetus
- Namesake: George B. Cortelyou; The constellation Cetus
- Ordered: as a Type EC2-S-C1 hull, MCE hull 445
- Builder: Permanente Metals Corporation, Richmond, California
- Cost: $1,111,002
- Yard number: 445
- Way number: 11
- Laid down: 21 November 1942
- Launched: 26 December 1942
- Sponsored by: Mrs. Norman F. Potter
- Acquired: 4 January 1943
- Commissioned: 17 January 1943
- Decommissioned: 20 November 1945
- Stricken: 5 December 1945
- Identification: Hull symbol: AK-77; Code letters: NYMF
- Honors and awards: 2 × battle stars
- Fate: Sold for scrapping, 26 October 1971, delivered, 6 January 1972

General characteristics
- Class & type: Crater-class cargo ship
- Displacement: 4,023 long tons (4,088 t) (standard); 14,550 long tons (14,780 t) (full load)
- Length: 441 ft 6 in (134.57 m)
- Beam: 56 ft 11 in (17.35 m)
- Draft: 28 ft 4 in (8.64 m)
- Installed power: 2 × Oil fired 450 °F (232 °C) boilers, operating at 220 psi (1,500 kPa) , (manufactured by Combustion Engineering); 2,500 shp (1,900 kW)
- Propulsion: 1 × Vertical triple-expansion reciprocating steam engine, (manufactured by Joshua Hendy); 1 × screw propeller
- Speed: 12.5 kn (23.2 km/h; 14.4 mph)
- Capacity: 7,800 t (7,700 long tons) DWT; 444,206 cu ft (12,578.5 m^{3}) (non-refrigerated)
- Complement: 210
- Armament: 1 × 5 in (127 mm)/38 caliber dual-purpose (DP) gun; 1 × 3 in (76 mm)/50 caliber DP gun; 2 × 40 mm (1.57 in) Bofors anti-aircraft (AA) gun mounts; 6 × 20 mm (0.79 in) Oerlikon cannon AA gun mounts

USS Cetus (AK-77) was a Crater-class cargo ship in the service of the United States Navy in World War II. Named after the equatorial constellation Cetus, it was the only ship of the Navy to bear this name.

== Construction ==
Cetus was laid down 21 November 1942 as liberty ship SS George B. Cortelyou, MCE hull 445, by Permanente Metals Corporation, Yard No. 2, Richmond, California, under a United States Maritime Commission (MARCOM) contract; launched 26 December 1942; sponsored by Mrs. Norman F. Potter; acquired by the Navy 4 January 1943; and commissioned 17 January 1943.

== Service history ==
Cetus' assignment, for which she sailed from San Francisco 1 February 1943, was carrying cargo among South Pacific bases, and from ports in New Zealand. She arrived at Espiritu Santo, New Hebrides, 24 February, and began her share of the buildup of Solomon and Society Islands bases from which naval forces fought north through the Bismarcks. On 12 July 1944, she sailed from Guadalcanal for Eniwetok, where she prepared for her support of the invasion of Guam. She put to sea again 23 July, and arrived off Guam 27 July, 6 days after the initial assault. With bitter fighting continuing ashore, Cetus offloaded her much needed cargo over reefs and beaches, then returned to the South Pacific.

In September and October 1944, Cetus brought cargo, some of which eventually played its part in the liberation of the Philippines, from Espiritu Santo to Ulithi and Manus. Cetus lay just outside Manus Harbor 10 November when ammunition ship Mount Hood exploded, but escaped injury. She returned to Auckland and Wellington, New Zealand, to load cargo after brief overhaul, and on 18 March 1945 arrived at Guam to aid in preparations for the invasion of Okinawa, carrying cargo to Saipan, and then to Ulithi. On 26 April she herself arrived off Okinawa, with cargo to support the determined fighting ashore. Cetus unloaded under the constant hazard of enemy air and surface suicide attack, but received no injury. She then sailed for San Francisco, arriving on 12 June for a major overhaul which kept her there until after the close of the war.

== Decommission and final disposition ==
She proceeded on to Norfolk, Virginia, where she was decommissioned 20 November 1945, and returned to MARCOM the following day.

She was laid up in the National Defense Reserve Fleet, James River Group, Lee Hall, Virginia, 21 November 1945. She was sold to Hierros Ardes, S.A., Spain, for $71,520 on 26 October 1971, for scrapping. She was removed, 6 January 1972.

== Awards ==
Cetus received two battle stars for World War II service.

== Bibliography ==
- "Cetus". Dictionary of American Naval Fighting Ships. Naval History and Heritage Command. This article incorporates text from this source, which is in the public domain.
- "Kaiser Permanente No. 2, Richmond CA". ShipbuildingHistory.com. 13 October 2010.
- "USS Cetus (AK-77)". NavSource. 21 November 2014.
- "GEORGE B. CORTELYOU (AK-77)". United States Department of Transportation. Archived from the original on 12 December 2019.
- "SS GEORGE B. CORTELYOU".
