= George B. Cortelyou =

American politician (1862–1940)

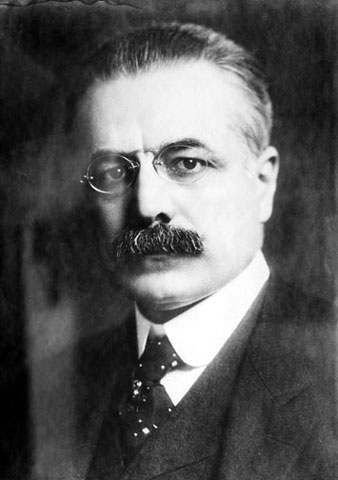
- Cortelyou (c. 1905–1907)

44th United States Secretary of the Treasury
- In office March 4, 1907 – March 7, 1909
- President: Theodore Roosevelt; William Howard Taft
- Preceded by: Leslie Shaw
- Succeeded by: Franklin MacVeagh

42nd United States Postmaster General
- In office March 6, 1905 – January 14, 1907
- President: Theodore Roosevelt
- Preceded by: Robert Wynne
- Succeeded by: George Meyer

Chair of the Republican National Committee
- In office June 23, 1904 – January 7, 1907
- Preceded by: Henry Payne (Acting)
- Succeeded by: Harry New

1st United States Secretary of Commerce and Labor
- In office February 18, 1903 – June 30, 1904
- President: Theodore Roosevelt
- Preceded by: Position established
- Succeeded by: Victor H. Metcalf

Secretary to the President
- In office May 1, 1900 – February 18, 1903
- President: William McKinley; Theodore Roosevelt
- Preceded by: John Addison Porter
- Succeeded by: William Loeb Jr.

Personal details
- Born: George Bruce Cortelyou; July 26, 1862 New York City, U.S.
- Died: October 23, 1940 (aged 78) New York City, U.S.
- Party: Republican
- Spouse: Lilly Morris Hinds
- Education: Westfield State University (BA); Georgetown University (LLB); George Washington University (LLM)

George Bruce Cortelyou (July 26, 1862 – October 23, 1940) was an American politician. He served in various capacities in the presidential administrations of Grover Cleveland, William McKinley, and Theodore Roosevelt.

Born in New York City, Cortelyou worked for the United States Post Office Department and came to the attention of Postmaster General Wilson S. Bissell. On Bissell's recommendation, President Cleveland hired Cortelyou as his chief clerk. On Cleveland's recommendation, McKinley hired Cortelyou as his personal secretary. After the assassination of William McKinley, Roosevelt asked Cortelyou to lead an effort to reorganize the White House.

Impressed with Cortelyou's performance, Roosevelt appointed him United States Secretary of Commerce and Labor in 1903. He left this position in 1904 to become chairman of the Republican National Committee, and in 1905 he also served as Postmaster General. He left both positions to become the United States Secretary of the Treasury in 1907. In this position, he worked to keep the economy stable during the Panic of 1907. After Roosevelt left office in 1909, Cortelyou became president of the Consolidated Gas Company. He died in 1940.

== Early life ==
Cortelyou was born in New York City to Rose (née Seary) and Peter Crolius Cortelyou Jr. He was a member of an old New Netherlandish family whose immigrant ancestor, Jacques Cortelyou, arrived in 1652. He was educated in the public schools of Brooklyn, at Nazareth Hall Military Academy in Pennsylvania, and at Hempstead Institute on Long Island.

At the age of 20, Cortelyou received a BA degree from Westfield Normal School, now Westfield State University, a teachers' college in Westfield, Massachusetts. He earned law degrees from George Washington University and Georgetown University. He was a member of the Phi Sigma Kappa fraternity while at George Washington University. Cortelyou then began teaching, later taking a stenography course and mastering shorthand. On September 15, 1888, Cortelyou married the former Lily Morris Hinds, with whom he had five children.

== Early career ==
In 1891 he obtained a position as secretary to the chief postal inspector of New York. The following year, a promotion led to a position as secretary to the Fourth Assistant Postmaster General in Washington, D.C. In 1895, President Grover Cleveland hired Cortelyou as his chief clerk on the recommendation of Postmaster General Wilson S. Bissell. Cleveland recommended him as personal secretary to his successor, William McKinley. Cortelyou was working to improve the efficiency of the office when President McKinley was assassinated in 1901. He was the third president to be assassinated.

McKinley was greeting visitors at the Temple of Music at the Pan-American Exposition in Buffalo, New York, on September 6, 1901, when he was shot twice at close range by lone assassin Leon Czolgosz, a twenty-eight-year-old anarchist. As McKinley collapsed, he was caught and supported by his aides, including Cortelyou. As he was held in their arms, he whispered, "My wife... be careful, Cortelyou, how you tell her. Oh, be careful." He died eight days later at the age of fifty-eight.

After succeeding McKinley as president, Theodore Roosevelt charged Cortelyou with transforming the White House into a more professional organization. Cortelyou developed procedures and rules that guided White House protocol and established processes for which there had been only personal prerogative. Cortelyou is also credited with establishing an improved line of communication between the President's office and the press; he provided reporters with their own work space, briefed journalists on major news events, and distributed press releases. Cortelyou is credited with establishing the first systematic collection of press clippings for a sitting president to review. The "Current Clippings" were the first attempt by a president to gauge public opinion through the media. Cortelyou selected the articles objectively, a practice not consistently followed by his successors.

== Roosevelt's administration ==
Cortelyou served as the first Secretary of Commerce and Labor from February 18, 1903, to June 30, 1904. He also served as Postmaster General from March 6, 1905, to January 14, 1907, and was Secretary of the Treasury, all under Theodore Roosevelt. From 1904 to 1907, Cortelyou also served as chairman of the Republican National Committee, working for the successful re-election of Theodore Roosevelt.

On April 9, 1903, he was made an honorary member of the Phi Mu Alpha Sinfonia fraternity. He had attended the New England Conservatory of Music, where the fraternity was founded.

Cortelyou served as Secretary of the Treasury from March 4, 1907, to March 7, 1909. This was during the devastating Panic of 1907. Like his predecessor, Leslie M. Shaw, Cortelyou believed it was the duty of the Treasury to protect the banking system, but he realized that the Treasury was not equipped to maintain economic stability. He mitigated the crisis by depositing large amounts of government funds in national banks and buying government bonds. To prevent future crises, Cortelyou advocated a more flexible currency and recommended the creation of a central banking system.

In 1908, the Aldrich–Vreeland Act was passed, providing for a special currency to be issued in times of panic and creating a commission that led to the creation of the Federal Reserve in 1913.

== Later life, death, and legacy ==
He returned to the private sector as president of the Consolidated Gas Company, later known as Consolidated Edison. He was also one of the chairmen of the Con Edison Energy Museum, which is now closed. He lived at his home "Harbor Lights" in Halesite, Long Island until his death in October 1940. Edith Roosevelt attended the wake at his home, as she was a close friend of his wife. He is buried in the Memorial Cemetery of St. John's Church in Laurel Hollow, New York. Cortelyou, an unincorporated community in Washington County, Alabama, changed its name from Richardson to Cortelyou while George Cortelyou was United States Postmaster General. In 1942, a Liberty ship was to be named for him; this ship later became the cargo ship USS Cetus.

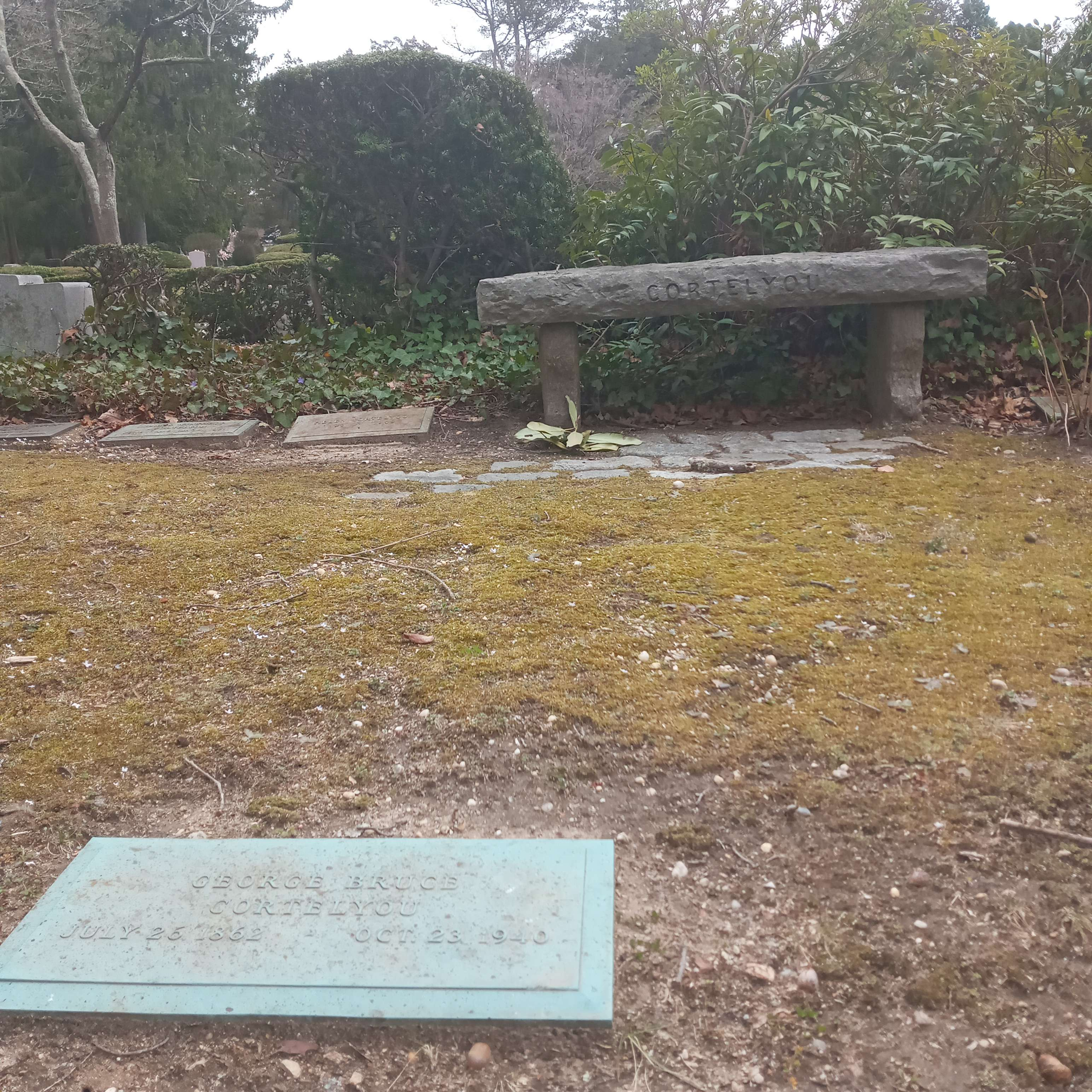
The gravesite of George B. Courtelyou

== See also ==
- Jacques Cortelyou
- Cortelyou Road (BMT Brighton Line), thus derives its name from Jacques Cortelyou
- Cortelyou Library

Political offices
New office	United States Secretary of Commerce and Labor; 1903–1904	Succeeded by Victor H. Metcalf
Preceded by Robert Wynne	United States Postmaster General; 1905–1907	Succeeded by George Meyer
Preceded by Leslie Shaw	United States Secretary of the Treasury; 1907–1909	Succeeded by Franklin MacVeagh
Party political offices
Preceded by Henry Payne; Acting	Chair of the Republican National Committee; 1904–1907	Succeeded by Harry New
