= Isolationism =

Policy against engaging in international relations

Isolationism is a political philosophy advocating a foreign policy that opposes involvement in the political affairs, and especially the wars, of other countries. Thus, isolationism fundamentally advocates neutrality and opposes entanglement in military alliances and mutual defense pacts. In its purest form, isolationism opposes all commitments to foreign countries, including treaties and trade agreements. In the political science lexicon, there is also the term of "non-interventionism", which is sometimes improperly used to replace the concept of "isolationism". "Non-interventionism" is commonly understood as "a foreign policy of political or military non-involvement in foreign relations or in other countries' internal affairs". "Isolationism" should be interpreted more broadly as "a foreign policy grand strategy of military and political non-interference in international affairs and in the internal affairs of sovereign states, associated with trade and economic protectionism and cultural and religious isolation, as well as with the inability to be in permanent military alliances, with the preservation, however, of opportunities to participate in contemporary geopolitical alliances in the interests of the state along with permanent membership in international organizations of a non-military nature."

Isolationism has been defined as:

A policy or doctrine of trying to isolate one's country from the affairs of other nations by declining to enter into alliances, foreign economic commitments, international agreements, and generally attempting to make one's economy entirely self-reliant; seeking to devote the entire efforts of one's country to its own advancement, both diplomatically and economically, while remaining in a state of peace by avoiding foreign entanglements and responsibilities.

This contrasts with philosophies such as colonialism, expansionism, and liberal internationalism.

== By country ==
=== Bhutan ===
Before 1999, Bhutan had banned television and the Internet in order to preserve its culture, environment, and identity. Eventually, Jigme Singye Wangchuck lifted the ban on television and the Internet. His son, Jigme Khesar Namgyel Wangchuck, was elected Druk Gyalpo of Bhutan, which helped forge the Bhutanese democracy. Bhutan has subsequently undergone a transition from an absolute monarchy to a constitutional monarchy multi-party democracy. The development of Bhutanese democracy has been marked by the active encouragement and participation of the reigning Bhutanese monarchs since the 1950s, beginning with legal reforms, and culminating in the enactment of Bhutan's Constitution.

Tourism in Bhutan was prohibited until 1974. Since then, the country has allowed foreigners to visit, but has tightly controlled tourism in an effort to preserve its natural and cultural heritage. As of 2022, tourists must pay a $200 per day fee on top of other travel expenses such as meals and accommodation. Prior to 2022, visitors were not allowed to travel independently and had to be accompanied by a tour guide. As of 2021, Bhutan does not maintain formal foreign relations with any of the five permanent members of the UN Security Council, notably including China, its neighbor to the north with which it has a historically tense relationship.

=== Cambodia ===
From 1431 to 1863, the Kingdom of Cambodia enforced an isolationist policy. The policy prohibited foreign contact with most outside countries. When Pol Pot and the Khmer Rouge came to power on 17 April 1975 and established Democratic Kampuchea, the urban population of every city, including Phnom Penh, was relocated to the countryside. This was ordered by the Communist Party of Kampuchea and the secret police Santebal, and they then established an infamous prison gulag inside the torture chamber called Tuol Sleng (S-21). Cambodia proceeded to implement the Year Zero policy, hastening isolation from the rest of the world. Ultimately, the authority of the Khmer Rouge and its isolationist policy would collapse in 1978 when the Vietnamese invaded the country and then overthrew Pol Pot on 7 January 1979.

=== China ===
After Zheng He's voyages in the 15th century, the foreign policy of the Ming dynasty in China became increasingly isolationist. The Hongwu Emperor was not the first to propose the policy to ban all maritime shipping in 1390. The Qing dynasty that came after the Ming dynasty often continued the Ming dynasty's isolationist policies. Wokou, which literally translates to "Japanese pirates" or "dwarf pirates", were pirates who raided the coastlines of China, Japan, and Korea, and were one of the key primary concerns, although the maritime ban was not without some control.

In the winter of 1757, the Qianlong Emperor declared that—effective the next year—Guangzhou was to be the only Chinese port permitted to foreign traders, beginning the Canton System.

Since the division of the territory following the Chinese Civil War in 1949, China is divided into two regimes with the People's Republic of China solidified control on mainland China while the existing Republic of China was confined to the island of Taiwan as both governments lay claim to each other's sovereignty. While the PRC is recognized by the United Nations, European Union, and the majority of the world's states, the ROC remains diplomatically isolated although 15 states recognize it as "China" with some countries maintaining unofficial diplomatic relations through trade offices.

=== Japan ===
From 1641 to 1853, the Tokugawa shogunate of Japan enforced a policy called kaikin. The policy prohibited foreign contact with most outside countries. The commonly held idea that Japan was entirely closed, however, is misleading. In fact, Japan maintained limited-scale trade and diplomatic relations with China, Korea, and the Ryukyu Islands, as well as the Dutch Republic as the only Western trading partner of Japan for much of the period.

The culture of Japan developed with limited influence from the outside world and had one of the longest stretches of peace in history. During this period, Japan developed thriving cities, castle towns, increasing commodification of agriculture and domestic trade, wage labor, increasing literacy and concomitant print culture, laying the groundwork for modernization even as the shogunate itself grew weak.

=== Korea ===
In 1863, Emperor Gojong took the throne of the Joseon Dynasty when he was a child. His father, Regent Heungseon Daewongun, ruled for him until Gojong reached adulthood. During the mid-1860s he was the main proponent of isolationism and the principal instrument of the persecution of both native and foreign Catholics.

Following the division of the peninsula after independence from Japan at the end of World War II, Kim Il Sung inaugurated an isolationist nationalist regime in the North, which would be continued by his son and grandson following his death in 1994.

=== Paraguay ===
In 1814, three years after it gained its independence on May 14, 1811, Paraguay was taken over by the dictator José Gaspar Rodríguez de Francia. During his rule which lasted from 1814 until his death in 1840, he closed Paraguay's borders and prohibited trade or any relationship between Paraguay and the outside world. The Spanish settlers who had arrived in Paraguay just before it gained its independence were required to marry old colonists or the native Guaraní in order to create a single Paraguayan people.

Francia had a particular dislike of foreigners, and any foreigners who attempted to enter the country were not allowed to leave for an indefinite period of time. An independent character, he hated European influences and the Catholic Church and in order to try to keep foreigners at bay, he turned church courtyards into artillery parks and turned confession boxes into border sentry posts.

=== United States ===
Some scholars, such as Robert J. Art, believe that the United States had an isolationist history, but most other scholars dispute that claim by describing the United States as following a strategy of unilateralism or non-interventionism rather than a strategy of isolationism. Robert Art makes his argument in A Grand Strategy for America (2003). Books that have made the argument that the United States followed unilateralism instead of isolationism include Walter A. McDougall's Promised Land, Crusader State (1997), John Lewis Gaddis's Surprise, Security, and the American Experience (2004), and Bradley F. Podliska's Acting Alone (2010). Both sides claim policy prescriptions from George Washington's Farewell Address as evidence for their argument. Bear F. Braumoeller argues that even the best case for isolationism, the United States in the interwar period, has been widely misunderstood and that Americans proved willing to fight as soon as they believed a genuine threat existed. Warren F. Kuehl and Gary B. Ostrower argue:

Events during and after the Revolution related to the treaty of alliance with France, as well as difficulties arising over the neutrality policy pursued during the French revolutionary wars and the Napoleonic wars, encouraged another perspective. A desire for separateness and unilateral freedom of action merged with national pride and a sense of continental safety to foster the policy of isolation. Although the United States maintained diplomatic relations and economic contacts abroad, it sought to restrict these as narrowly as possible in order to retain its independence. The Department of State continually rejected proposals for joint cooperation, a policy made explicit in the Monroe Doctrine's emphasis on unilateral action. Not until 1863 did an American delegate attend an international conference.

== Criticism ==
Isolationism has been criticized for the lack of aiding nations with major troubles. One notable example is that of American isolationism, which Benjamin Schwartz described as a "tragedy" inspired by Puritanism.

Some modern American conservative commentators assert that labeling others as isolationist is used against individuals in a pejorative manner.

== See also ==
- Autarky
- Cordon sanitaire
- Economic nationalism
- Iron Curtain
- Indigenous peoples in voluntary isolation
- International isolation
- Monroe Doctrine
- Non-interventionism
- Sakoku, Japan's policy before 1868
- Swiss neutrality
- Isolation (disambiguation)
- Splendid isolation
- United States non-interventionism
- Unilateralism in the United States
- Why die for Danzig?
