= Elaws (Employment Laws Assistance for Workers and Small Businesses) =

elaws (Employment Laws Assistance for Workers and Small Businesses)
- Type: Government Website
- Purpose: Employment laws assistance for workers and small businesses.
- Affiliations: U.S. Department of Labor
- Website: www.dol.gov/elaws

The elaws (Employment Laws Assistance for Workers and Small Businesses) Advisors are a set of interactive, online tools developed by the U.S. Department of Labor to help employers and employees learn more about their rights and responsibilities under numerous Federal employment laws. They address some of the nation's most widely applicable employment laws, offering easy-to-understand information on areas such as:

- Pay and overtime
- Family and medical leave
- Health benefits
- Disability discrimination
- Workplace safety and health
- Union elections
- Veterans’ employment
- Youth employment
- Federal contractor requirements

elaws Advisors are free and mimic the interaction someone would have with an employment law expert by asking specific questions and providing tailored information based on individual situations and circumstances. Depending on the topic, questions might pertain to industry, staff size and how long a particular employee has worked for his or her employer. All questions offer pre-set answers to choose from, and no information provided is recorded or stored in any system. elaws can be located at www.dol.gov/elaws. elaws address some of the nation's most widely applicable employment laws. The following is a list of all elaws Advisors. Please note that elaws Advisors have not yet been built for every U.S. Department of Labor law and regulation.

- Disability Nondiscrimination Law Advisor
- Drug-Free Workplace Advisor
- ERISA Fiduciary Advisor
- Family & Medical Leave Act (FMLA) Advisor
- Federal Contractor Compliance Advisor
- FirstStep Employment Law Overview Advisor
- FirstStep Recordkeeping, Reporting, and Notices Advisor
- FirstStep Poster Advisor
- Fair Labor Standards Act (FLSA) Advisor
- FLSA Coverage & Employment Status Advisor
- FLSA Overtime Calculator Advisor
- FLSA Overtime Security Advisor
- FLSA Hours Worked Advisor
- FLSA Child Labor Rules Advisor
- FLSA Section 14 (c) Advisor (Special Minimum Wage)
- H-1B Advisor
- Health Benefits Advisor
- Health Benefits Advisor for Employers
- MSHA Online Forms Advisor
- MSHA Training Plan Advisor
- MSHA Fire Suppression & Fire Protection Advisor
- OLMS Union Elections Advisor
- OSHA Confined Spaces Advisor
- OSHA Fire Safety Advisor
- OSHA Hazard Awareness Advisor
- OSHA Lead in Construction Advisor
- OSHA Recordkeeping Advisor
- OSHA Software Expert Advisors
- Poster Advisor
- Reallifelines Advisor
- Small Business Retirement Savings Advisor
- Uniformed Services Employment and Reemployment Rights Act (USERRA) Advisor
- Veterans' Preference Advisor
- e-VETS Resource Advisor
- Worker Adjustment and Retraining Notification Act (WARN) Advisor
