= United States House Select Committee on Benghazi =

US committee investigating the Benghazi attack

The United States House Select Committee on Events Surrounding the 2012 Terrorist Attack in Benghazi was created after Speaker of the United States House of Representatives John Boehner, on May 2, 2014, proposed that a House select committee would be formed to further investigate the Benghazi attack on September 11, 2012. During the attack, the U.S. diplomatic mission in Benghazi, Libya, was attacked, resulting in the deaths of the U.S. ambassador to that country, J. Christopher Stevens, and three other Americans.

On May 8, 2014, the House voted 232–186 to establish the select committee, with 225 Republicans and 7 Democrats in favor, and 186 Democrats voting against. The chairman of the committee was Representative Trey Gowdy from South Carolina. It was the last of six investigations conducted by Republican-controlled House committees. The committee closed on December 12, 2016, after issuing its final report.

== Background ==
Frank Wolf, Republican from Virginia, introduced House Resolution (H.Res.) 36 on January 18, 2013, with 192 co-sponsoring House members, to establish a "select committee to investigate and report on the attack on the United States consulate in Benghazi, Libya." On May 22, 2013, Speaker Boehner, Republican from Ohio, resisted calls to create one saying: "I don't think at this point in time that it's necessary." He remained confident the five House committees investigating Benghazi—the Armed Services Committee, Foreign Affairs Committee, Intelligence Committee, Judiciary Committee and Oversight and Government Reform Committee—were sufficient and that there was no reason to set up a sixth committee, saying "At this point in time I see no reason to break up all the work that's been done and to take months and months and months to create some select committee."

In late April 2014, Judicial Watch—a conservative activist group that describes itself as an "educational foundation" concerned with "transparency, accountability and integrity in government"—made public previously unreleased White House emails showing administration adviser Ben Rhodes coordinating a public response strategy after the attack for then-United Nations ambassador for the U.S., Susan E. Rice, recommending she emphasize the attack was "rooted in an Internet video, and not a broader failure of policy." The email was part of materials, obtained through a Freedom of Information Act request, that were more comprehensive than those the White House had given congressional panels. A person whom Roll Call identified as a "senior GOP leadership aide" stated that this had been "the straw that broke the camel's back" for Boehner.

Frustrated with what he considered "stonewalling" from the White House, Boehner proposed creation of the special committee May 2, 2014. He stated: "it's clear that questions remain, and the administration still does not respect the authority of Congress to provide proper oversight. This dismissiveness and evasion requires us to elevate the investigation to a new level." A growing battle for control of Benghazi investigations between existing House committees may also have been a factor in Boehner's decision to create the select committee. The resolution that passed and created the select committee was generally similar to, but not the same as, the original H.Res. 36. Only seven Democrats "broke ranks" to vote with the majority party to establish the select committee: Ron Barber of Arizona, John Barrow of Georgia, Mike McIntyre of North Carolina, Patrick Murphy of Florida, Collin Peterson of Minnesota, Nick Rahall of West Virginia, and Kyrsten Sinema of Arizona. The Democratic National Committee sent out a statement describing the committee as a "ploy" and "political stunt."

Following passage, on May 12 Republican Senator Ted Cruz of Texas requested that the US Senate agree to form a joint select committee on the matter with the House. The suggestion was quickly rejected in the Senate, which unlike the House was under Democratic control. Senator Lindsey Graham, Republican from South Carolina and member of the Senate Armed Services Committee, had said in November 2012 that Congress should form a special committee—like it had for the Watergate and Iran–Contra scandals—to investigate what happened before, during and after the Benghazi attack. On May 15, 2014, he joined 36 other Republican senators calling on Senate Majority Leader Harry Reid to establish a related select committee, saying: "Congressional oversight is crucial to understanding what happened before, during, and after the attacks, so we can be sure we do everything in our power to prevent future attacks."

On May 23, current Secretary of State John Kerry said he would appear before the Oversight and Government Reform Committee, in response to a second subpoena, or to "answer questions regarding the Department's response to Congressional investigations of the Benghazi attacks". In response to the State Department's insistence this would be a "one-and-done" appearance, meaning Kerry would not also appear before the select committee, a spokesperson for Boehner said: "We're glad Secretary Kerry will appear at Oversight. Whether he will also be asked appear before the Select Committee will be a decision for Chairman Gowdy in the future." Issa changed course a week later, releasing Kerry from the subpoena, thus nullifying State Department stated concerns about availability of the secretary for a select committee hearing.

== Members during the 113th and 114th Congress ==
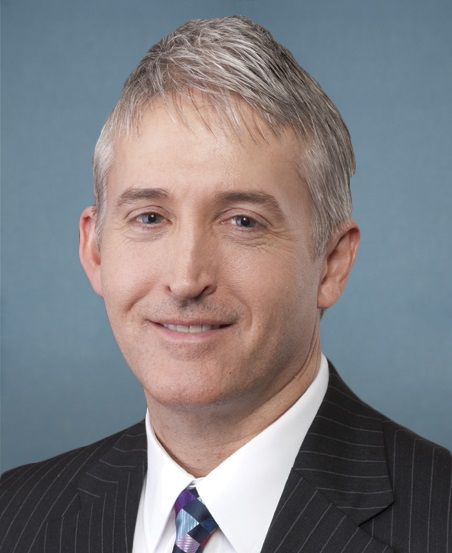
Chair Trey Gowdy (R-SC)

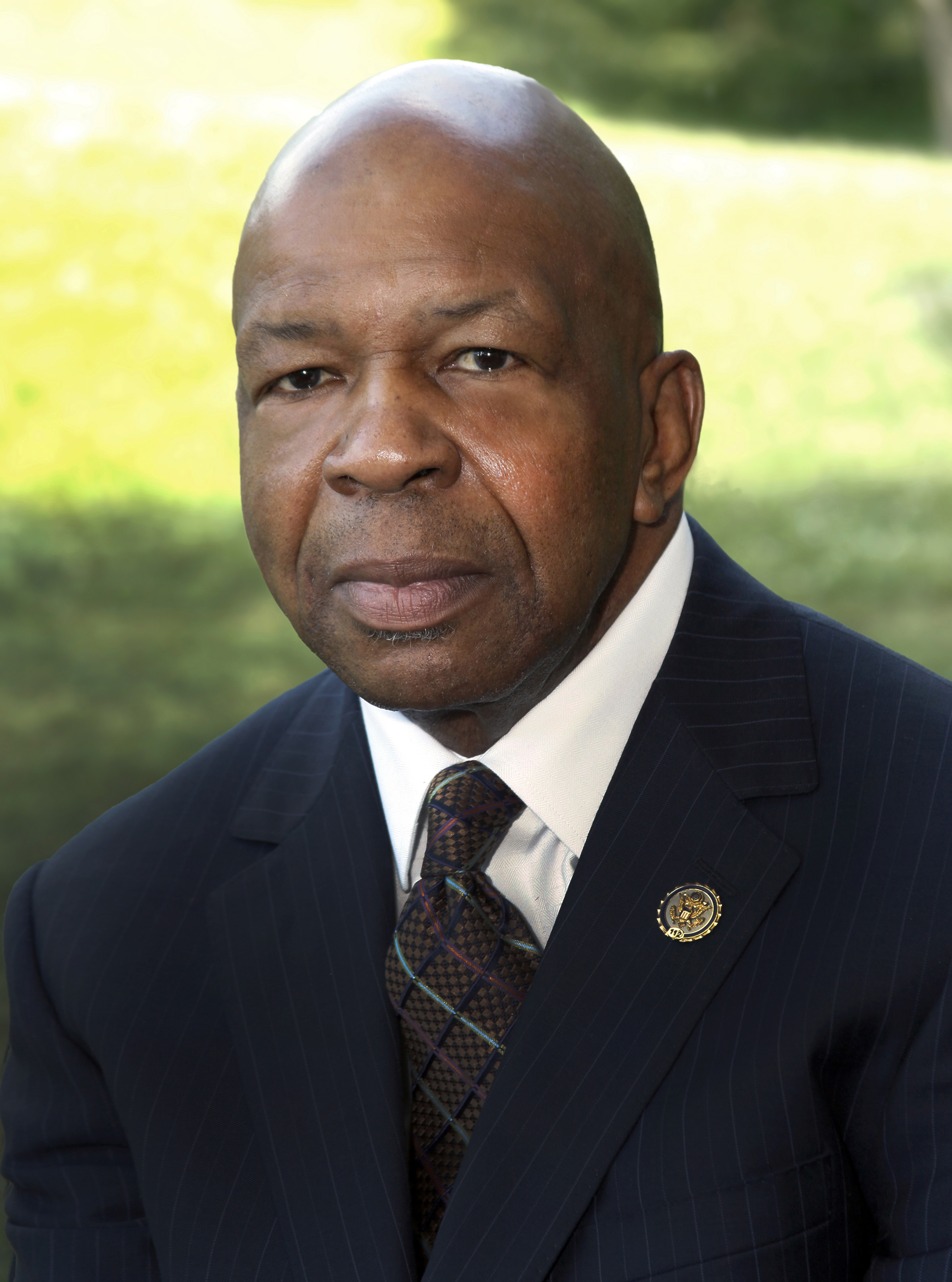
Ranking Minority Member Elijah Cummings (D-MD)

Speaker Boehner named the six additional Republican members of the Select Committee on the Events Surrounding the 2012 Terrorist Attack in Benghazi on May 9, 2014. Trey Gowdy had been announced as chair earlier, the 49-year-old former federal prosecutor having earned admiration among House conservatives. Minority Leader Nancy Pelosi, a Democrat from California, announced on May 21, 2014, that she was appointing five members of her caucus to serve on the panel, with Elijah Cummings of Maryland the ranking member.

Majority	Minority
Trey Gowdy, South Carolina, Chair; Susan Brooks, Indiana; Jim Jordan, Ohio; Mike Pompeo, Kansas; Martha Roby, Alabama; Peter Roskam, Illinois; Lynn Westmoreland, Georgia	Elijah Cummings, Maryland, Ranking Member; Adam Smith, Washington; Adam Schiff, California; Linda Sánchez, California; Tammy Duckworth, Illinois

Gowdy was a member of the Oversight and Government Reform Committee and a former federal and local prosecutor. Roby was the chair of the House Armed Services Subcommittee on Oversight and Investigations, and led that committee's investigation into military activities during the events in Benghazi. She is a former lawyer. Roskam was chief deputy Republican whip when the committee was formed, making him the fourth-ranking House Republican behind Boehner. Westmoreland was a member of the House Intelligence Committee. Brooks is a former U.S. attorney, Jordan has a J.D. degree, and Pompeo is a former lawyer.

Of the minority members, Cummings was the ranking Democrat on the Oversight and Government Reform Committee, Smith the ranking Democrat on the Armed Services Committee, and Schiff a member of the Intelligence Committee. Sánchez was the ranking member of the House Ethics Committee and a former member of the Intelligence Committee, while Duckworth was a member of the Armed Services and Oversight & Government Reform Committees. She was also the only combat veteran who was wounded during the Iraq War.

In his first personnel move, Gowdy selected Philip Kiko as majority chief of staff—a former aide to James Sensenbrenner, Republican from Wisconsin, when he was chair of the House Judiciary Committee.

== Minority participation question ==
House Democrats did not immediately commit to participating in the Benghazi attack investigation select committee. Aides for Boehner and Pelosi engaged in discussions over how the committee would operate, points of contention being shared authority to issue subpoenas, interview witnesses, and determine what can be released to the public. When she finally made the decision that her party would participate in the committee investigation, Pelosi acknowledged: "I could have argued this either way. Why give any validity to this effort?"

It's a hunting mission for a lynch mob actually, I think that's what's going on. There have been four major reports, we spent a year and a half on a report. We held hearings, thousands of pages were reviewed, the staff spent hours and weeks on it.

— Dianne Feinstein, Democrat from California, chair Senate Intelligence Committee

Previously Boehner denied Democratic demands for equal representation on the 12-member panel, broken out 7–5 for the majority party. The percentage of Democrats on the select committee was about the same as on the aggregated four committees previously involved in Benghazi investigations and hearings.

In a letter Pelosi sent to Boehner May 9, 2014, referring to the related House Oversight and Government Reform Committee investigation under chair Darrell Issa, she stated: "Regrettably, the proposal does not prevent the unacceptable and repeated abuses by committed by [sic] Chairman Issa in any meaningful way, and we find it ultimately unfair."

Schiff, calling the establishment of a select committee to investigate the 2012 attack a "colossal waste of time," stated Democratic leaders should not appoint any members, stating: "I think it's just a tremendous red herring and a waste of taxpayer resources." Rosa DeLauro, Democrat from Connecticut, pushed her party to appoint a single representative, believing: "Such a participant could maintain Democratic access to committee proceedings and material, question witnesses, monitor the House Majority's activities and provide a powerful voice to raise issues and make appropriate public comments." By some reports, supporters of Hillary Clinton—Secretary of State at the time of the attacks, and possible presidential candidate in 2016—urged Democrats to participate fully in the committee to better counteract possible Republican criticism of her.

When on May 21 Pelosi decided to name a full slate of Democrats to the committee, she argued that by selecting senior legislators—most of whom had already been engaged in investigations of the Benghazi attacks—Democrats could have a say in access to pertinent documents and determining the direction of the committee's investigation. Pelosi stated that participation would allow Democrats "to be there to fight for a fair hearing and process, to try to bring some openness and transparency to what's going on." Reacting to the minority appointments to the committee, Gowdy commented: "The ones that I know well are very thoughtful and very smart, and I have a great working relationship with them."

== Investigation and report ==
The expected focus of the investigation by the select committee is on events before, during, and after the actual attack. In particular, the resolution passed by the House states that the scope of the Select Committee's investigation include, but not be limited to:

1. Security decisions and military posture prior to the attack
2. The terrorist attack that occurred in Benghazi on September 11, 2012
3. The Executive Branch's response to the attack
4. The Executive Branch's efforts to identify and bring to justice the perpetrators of the attack
5. The Executive Branch's response to congressional inquiries and subpoenas
6. Recommendations for improving executive branch cooperation and compliance with congressional oversight
7. Lessons learned from the attacks and efforts to protect United States facilities and personnel abroad.

The panel has been assigned a budget of $3.3 million for this investigation and related hearings, which were expected to begin in September 2014, "after members return from the August recess."

== Hearings ==
The first hearing was held on September 17, 2014, two years after the attack and four months after the launch of the special investigation. The panel focused on what the administration has done to improve security at U.S. embassies and other diplomatic missions globally, calling Assistant Secretary of State for Diplomatic Security Gregory Starr, and security experts Todd Keil and Mark Sullivan who had served on a "State Department independent panel."

In December 2014, Committee Chairman Gowdy announced hearings would be held in January, February, and March the following the year. During that timeframe, a single January hearing was held, interviewing State Department legislative liaison Joel Rubin and CIA representative Neil Higgins. An announced hearing to be focused on explaining the State Department's presence in Benghazi was not held. In February, Gowdy notified ranking Democratic committee member Elijah Cummings that the committee would begin interviewing a list of twenty prominent members of the Obama administration in April. This would include Chairman of the Joint Chiefs of Staff Martin Dempsey, former White House Press Secretary Jay Carney, and former State Department Chief of Staff Cheryl Mills. Gowdy said on Fox News that April that the committee had gone from interviewing two witnesses a week to four. According to a Democrat committee aide, however, the committee had not conducted four interviews within a week at any point and a committee staff member said none of Gowdy's list of twenty Obama administration members had been interviewed.

Prior to interviewing longtime Clinton confidante Sidney Blumenthal on June 16, Gowdy told Politico that the committee had partly shifted focus from investigating the actual attack in Benghazi to reviewing policy decisions made by Clinton regarding Libya prior to the attack: "They believe we're supposed to be Benghazi-centered, looking at a couple of days on either side of the Benghazi attacks. But the language of the [House] resolution is pretty clear: We're to examine all policies and decisions that led to the attacks."

As of June 20, 2015, the Committee had conducted three hearings and interviewed 29 witnesses, substantially fewer than previous investigations such as that of the Iran–Contra scandal, which held 40 days of public hearings with 500 witness interviews over 10 1/2 months.

Of the committee's lack of progress, Cummings said, in mid-2015, "After a full year, it now seems obvious that this investigation is being dragged out in order to attack Secretary Clinton and her campaign for president—squandering millions of taxpayer dollars in the process." Gowdy has blamed the Obama administration's slow pace in producing documents, although the committee made its first document request to the State Department in mid-November 2014, and its document request to the Department of Defense was made in April 2015.

As of mid-2015, Gowdy was saying the committee would continue holding hearings into 2016.

== Interim progress report ==
Committee chairman Trey Gowdy released a 15-page "interim progress report" May 8, 2015, stating: "This Committee has interviewed eyewitnesses never before interviewed, obtained tens-of-thousands of pages of documents never before provided, and reviewed new information central to the investigation such as FBI reports specific to the interrogation and prosecution of (Benghazi attack suspect) Abu Khattala." He also stated: "the greatest impediment to completing this investigation in a timely manner has been the level of cooperation by the executive branch." In face of criticism regarding the slow pace of the investigation, Gowdy promised:

While our investigatory approach has uncovered new witnesses, new documents, new facts and will result in the most detailed and complete accounting of what happened in Benghazi, the frustration that some feel at not seeing the work unfold on television or reading about new discoveries in print is understandable . . The approach we are taking, while short on drama, aims to discover all of the relevant facts and to be long on credibility when the final report is written.

In response to delays on questioning Clinton, Rep. Elijah Cummings, the top Democrat on the panel, said that "the Select Committee comes up with a new excuse to further delay its work", and that "Republicans are desperately trying to validate the $3 million in taxpayer funds they have spent over the past year, but they have nothing to show for it other than a partisan attack against Secretary Clinton and her campaign for president."

== June 2015 depositions ==
Clinton confidante Sidney Blumenthal came to the Committee's attention when it learned that he had on numerous occasions sent Libyan intelligence to Clinton by email while she was at the State Department. The Committee voted to subpoena and depose Blumenthal regarding why he had emailed Clinton the unsubstantiated intelligence on Libya, whether he was paid for the work, and whether he used any of his connections with Clinton to benefit himself and his business partners who had interests in various business and financial contracts in Libya. "He clearly corresponded with one of the key decision-makers with respect to the security levels in Libya, the risk in Libya, Libya policy, and provided information to her [on] threats and potential responses to those threats," said Republican Committee member Mike Pompeo (R-Kansas), "So it is incumbent on our committee to learn ... what his role was in U.S. Libya policy and how it impacted decisions related to security."

The deposition was held on June 16, 2015. Under oath, Blumenthal indicated that, using then Secretary Clinton's private email server in her home in Chappaqua, New York, Blumenthal had sent Clinton several emails on Benghazi before and after the attack. Among them were suggestions as to the Administration's response, that linked to several postings by David Brock's Media Matters, in which Media Matters encouraged and defended the Administration's stated view of the cause of the attack and defended the State Department. The emails in question had not been included among those the State Department had provided earlier to Congress in answer to the Committee's subpoena (even though Secretary Clinton had maintained earlier that all her official government emails had been turned over to the Department before the hard drive of her private server was erased by the Clintons), but copies were instead obtained from Blumenthal from his files.

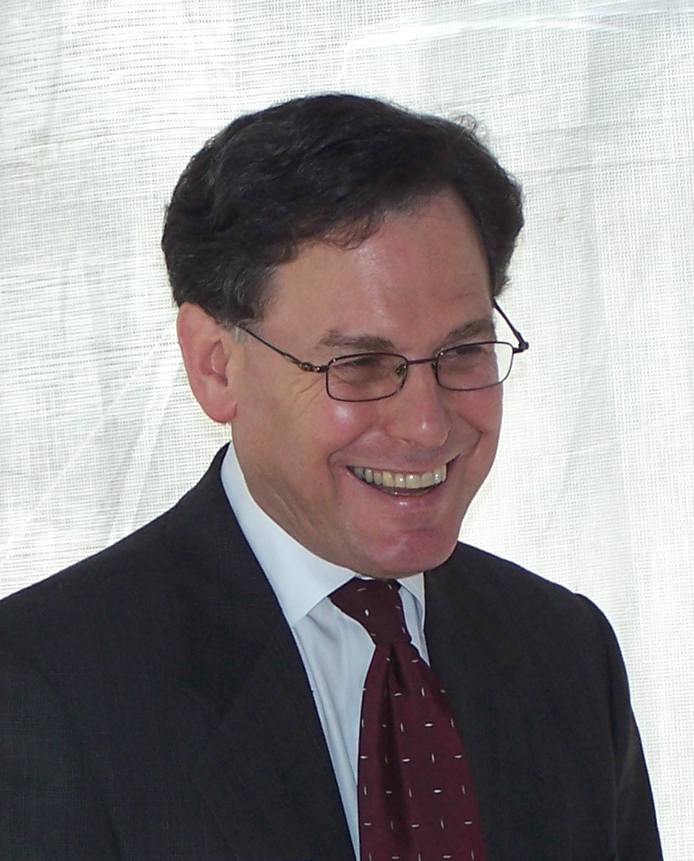
Clinton Foundation & Media Matters advisor Sidney Blumenthal

During Blumenthal's deposition, it was also ascertained by the Committee that, at the time he sent the emails to Clinton, Blumenthal was being paid an $320,000 annually by the Clinton Foundation, and was being paid $200,000 a year by David Brock. Although those payments did not necessarily create a conflict of interest for Blumenthal or for Clinton—Blumenthal's financial relationships with Brock's liberal advocacy and media groups, and with the Clinton Foundation and Secretary Clinton, then became a major focus of further questioning by the Committee. Members expressed concerns that his work with Brock's liberal advocacy and media groups, and the financial interests he held at the time in several contract proposals under consideration for Benghazi, may have presented problems when he was simultaneously sending political and messaging guidance to Clinton. During the deposition, Blumenthal testified that he had received the intelligence from a business contact and was not being paid to pass it along to Clinton.

Committee Democrats, who took issue with the June 16 deposition session, have called on Committee Chairman Gowdy to publicly release the transcript of the deposition, stating that the Blumenthal documents revealed no "smoking gun" about the attacks. "[I]n fact, they hardly relate to Benghazi at all," Rep. Elijah Cummings, D-Md., Ranking Minority Member on the committee, said in a statement. According to a fact sheet released by committee Democrats, of 270 questions posed to Blumenthal, less than 20 concerned the Benghazi attacks and only four concerned Benghazi's security. Blumenthal's attorney also called for the public release of his client's emails and private testimony transcripts, claiming that Republicans were selectively leaking emails as a way of "distorting the truth by mischaracterizing facts and circumstances." Brock of Media Matters portrayed the line of questioning as more focused on his organization's attempt to refute "false claims" about Benghazi than about the attacks themselves and said of the Committee's session, "Despite the fact that the conclusions of nine congressional committee reports and the findings from an independent review board don't support his political agenda, Chairman Gowdy keeps doubling down and expanding his taxpayer funded fishing expedition in the hopes of undermining Secretary Clinton's presidential campaign. This week's spectacle is the latest proof that he is failing."

After the hearing, Blumenthal said: "It seems obvious that my appearance before this committee was for one reason and one reason only—politics. ... [They] "spent hours asking me questions about things that had nothing to do with Benghazi," adding, "I hope I have cleared up the series of misconceptions some members of the committee may have held. ... My testimony has shed no light on the events of Benghazi—nor could it, because I have no firsthand knowledge." Republican Committee Members asserted, however, that scrutinizing Blumenthal's work for Brock's media and messaging groups, and for the Clinton Foundation, provide a perspective into the overall Clinton political and philanthropic operations as related to the Clintons' potential conflicts of interest regarding Benghazi and other matters while Mrs. Clinton was Secretary of State. Committee Democrats argued that the Committee's real motive was to provide fodder for campaign attacks.

== Calls for dissolution ==
On September 29, 2015, Republican Kevin McCarthy said the following during an appearance on Hannity: "Everybody thought Hillary Clinton was unbeatable, right? But we put together a Benghazi special committee, a select committee. What are her numbers today? Her numbers are dropping. Why? Because she's untrustable. But no one would have known any of that had happened, had we not fought."

In response, Pelosi threatened to pull the Democrats from the committee, and the Democrats on the committee released the full Mills testimony, which Republicans had refused to release. As Democrats considered filing a complaint with the Office of Congressional Ethics, Louise Slaughter introduced an amendment to end the committee, which was defeated in a party-line vote. Steny Hoyer indicated that Democrats might leave the committee after Clinton's testimony, scheduled for October 22. The editorial board of The New York Times called for the end of the committee on October 7, by which time the committee had spent $4.6 million. Alan Grayson took the step of filing an ethics complaint, alleging that the committee violates both House rules and federal law by using official funds for political purposes, while calling the committee "the new McCarthyism." Also, Richard Hanna, a Republican representative from New York, and conservative pundit Bill O'Reilly acknowledged the partisan nature of the committee.

Several days later, McCarthy followed up on his comments and said that "Benghazi is not political. It was created for one purpose and one purpose only—to find the truth on behalf of the families of four dead Americans. ... The integrity of Chairman Gowdy, the Committee and the work they've accomplished is beyond reproach. The serious questions Secretary Clinton faces are due entirely to her own decision to put classified information at risk and endanger our national security. ... I've been very clear about this. And don't use politics to try to change this around. I could have been more clear in my description of what was going forward."

In October 2015, Bradley F. Podliska, who worked on the committee as a staffer, claimed that the purpose of the committee was political, and that he was fired from the committee for going on military orders and for not focusing his research on Clinton. In a statement, the committee denied Podliska's allegations about why he was fired and defended the objectivity of the panel's investigation. Podliska filed a wrongful termination lawsuit in November 2015, claiming his USERRA rights were violated, that the Benghazi Committee retaliated against him for trying to enforce his USERRA rights, and that Chairman Trey Gowdy defamed him and violated his due process rights. In January 2023, Podliska provided evidence of his claims in his book, Fire Alarm: The Investigation of the U.S. House Select Committee on Benghazi. Using qualitative and quantitative methods, Podliska applied a new partisan model to explain that the Speaker of the House John Boehner selected committee members and staff based on party loyalty and “to ensure execution of party strategy.” Podliska detailed how Clinton was over emphasized at the expense of the White House, Department of Defense, and Intelligence Community. Podliska then provided evidence and analysis to determine who was responsible for U.S. policy in Libya, who wrote the Obama administration’s post-attack narrative, and why the military failed to perform a timely rescue.

The chairman of the committee, Trey Gowdy, said in an interview that he has told his Republican colleagues to "shut up talking about things that you don't know anything about. And unless you're on the committee, you have no idea what we have done, why we have done it and what new facts we have found."

== October 2015 Hillary Clinton appearance ==
On October 22, 2015, Clinton testified for a second time before the Benghazi Committee and answered members' questions for more than eight hours in a public hearing. The hearing, held in the committee room of the House Ways and Means Committee, began at 10 a.m. and lasted until 9 p.m. (with various breaks in between).

The New York Times reported that "the long day of often-testy exchanges between committee members and their prominent witness revealed little new information about an episode that has been the subject of seven previous investigations ... Perhaps stung by recent admissions that the pursuit of Mrs. Clinton's emails was politically motivated, Republican lawmakers on the panel for the most part avoided any mention of her use of a private email server." The email issue did arise shortly before lunch, in "a shouting match" between Republican committee chair Trey Gowdy and two Democrats, Adam B. Schiff and Elijah E. Cummings. Late in the hearing, Representative Jim Jordan, Republican of Ohio, accused Clinton of changing her accounts of the email service, leading to a "heated exchange" in which Clinton "repeated that she had made a mistake in using a private email account, but maintained that she had never sent or received anything marked classified and had sought to be transparent by publicly releasing her emails."

During questioning by Martha Roby, which probed Clinton on the minute-by-minute events on the day of the Benghazi attacks, Clinton laughed upon being asked whether she was alone after leaving the State Department offices, which drew scorn from Roby. Cummings, the ranking Democrat on the Benghazi committee, came to Clinton's defense during the hearing, apologizing to her for his colleagues who suggested that she did not care for the people who died on her watch. Cummings also accused Republicans of using taxpayer dollars to try to destroy Mrs. Clinton's presidential campaign.

According to The Hill, the hearings provided a positive momentum for Clinton's 2016 campaign, with her performance generating headlines such as "Marathon Benghazi hearing leaves Hillary Clinton largely unscathed" (CNN), and "GOP lands no solid punches while sparring with Clinton over Benghazi" (The Washington Post). Her campaign received a windfall of donations, mostly coming from new donors.

== Private server ==
In the end, the biggest revelation unearthed by the House special committee investigating the Benghazi attack came 15 months ago: the disclosure that Hillary Clinton had used a private email address and server during her four years as secretary of state.

— The New York Times

On February 13, 2015, the State Department produced 300 emails to and from Clinton, in response to a November 18, 2014, Committee request for the entirety of communications to and from the Secretary and her top staff. The State Department informed the Committee, in discussions late February 2015, that because the Secretary had no government email address it only gained access to her emails after her attorney handed them over in December 2014. Committee spokesman Jamal Ware said: "The only records the committee has received were self-selected by the former secretary and turned over by her. The State Department did not have control or custody over those emails."

On March 2, 2015, The New York Times reported Clinton may have violated federal regulations by using her personal email account (hdr22@clintonemail.com) for public business while serving as secretary of state. Two days later the Associated Press reported Clinton's personal email address traced to a private email server at her home in Chappaqua, New York (registered under a pseudonym).

In response to the discovery of her personal email server being used for her official government correspondence, Clinton tweeted:

I want the public to see my email. I asked State to release them. They said they will review them for release as soon as possible.

== Main report ==
The Republicans on the committee released their main report on June 28, 2016, with committee chairman Gowdy saying its contents should "fundamentally change the way you view Benghazi." Major findings from the investigation included:

1. The State Department failed to protect U.S. diplomats in Libya: Clinton and the administration should have realized and addressed risks. (The Democrats' version of the report acknowledges "security measures in Benghazi were woefully inadequate").
2. The CIA misread how dangerous Libya was in midst of a revolution after overthrowing Gaddafi a year earlier.
3. The Defense Department failed to rescue Americans: U.S. military forces did not reach Benghazi until mid-afternoon the day after the initial attack on the compound. "No U.S. military asset was ever deployed to Benghazi despite the order of the Secretary of Defense at 7 o'clock that night," Gowdy said.
4. The Administration subverted investigation through what Gowdy described as "intentional", "coordinated", and "shameful" stonewalling. Clinton deleted numerous emails on the private server she was using for official business, which the report says "makes it impossible to ever represent to those killed in Benghazi that the record is whole."
5. A Clinton aide influenced the State Department's review: Cheryl Mills, Clinton's former chief of staff has said she offered suggestions on drafts.
6. Americans were transported to Benghazi airport by Khaddafi loyalists, the same group the U.S. had sought to oust earlier. Stated the report: "Some of the very individuals the United States had helped remove from power during the Libyan revolution were the only Libyans that came to the assistance of the United States on the night of the Benghazi attack."
7. A White House meeting during the attack generated a list of 10 action items, half of which related to an anti-Muslim YouTube video that sparked protests at the U.S. Embassy in Cairo.

In addition to the main report, alternate versions of committee findings were also prepared; another by House Republicans and one by House Democrats. The State Department prepared a report of its own internal investigation of the attack. The report itself found no wrongdoing by Hillary Clinton.

== See also ==
- Ambassadors of the United States killed in office
- Aftermath of the Libyan Civil War
- Hillary Clinton email controversy
- International response to the reactions to Innocence of Muslims
- List of United States House of Representatives committees
