= Cat's paw theory =

Legal doctrine

The Cat's Paw theory is a legal doctrine in employment discrimination cases that derives its name from the fable "The Monkey and the Cat," attributed to Jean de La Fontaine. In the fable, a cunning monkey persuades a naïve cat to retrieve chestnuts from a fire, with the cat ultimately burning its paws while the monkey enjoys the chestnuts. In the context of employment law, the theory addresses situations where a biased employee or supervisor manipulates a neutral decision-maker into taking an adverse employment action against another employee, based on discriminatory motives.

This legal doctrine has been applied in United States employment discrimination cases since the early 1990s. The United States Supreme Court formally recognized and clarified the application of the Cat's Paw theory in the 2011 case Staub v. Proctor Hospital. In Staub, the Court held that an employer may be held liable for employment discrimination under the Uniformed Services Employment and Reemployment Rights Act (USERRA) if a biased supervisor's actions are a proximate cause of an adverse employment action, even if the ultimate decision-maker was not personally biased.

The Cat's Paw theory has since been applied in cases involving other anti-discrimination statutes, such as Title VII of the Civil Rights Act of 1964, the Age Discrimination in Employment Act (ADEA), and the Americans with Disabilities Act (ADA). The doctrine provides a basis for holding employers accountable when they inadvertently rely on the discriminatory animus of an employee in making employment decisions, even when the decision-maker is otherwise unbiased.
