= CSX Transportation, Inc. v. Alabama Department of Revenue =

CSX Transp., Inc. v. Ala. Dept. of Revenue
- Supreme Court of the United States

Decided February 22, 2011
- Full case name: CSX Transportation, Inc. v. Alabama Department of Revenue
- Citations: 562 U.S. 277 (more)

Holding
- A railroad can challenge state's sales and use taxes as discriminatory under the Railroad Revitalization and Regulatory Reform Act of 1976 when the tax in question is imposed on railroads but not their main competitors

Court membership
- Chief Justice John Roberts Associate Justices Antonin Scalia · Anthony Kennedy; Clarence Thomas · Ruth Bader Ginsburg; Stephen Breyer · Samuel Alito; Sonia Sotomayor · Elena Kagan

Case opinions
- Majority: Kagan, joined by Roberts, Scalia, Kennedy, Breyer, Alito, Sotomayor
- Dissent: Thomas, joined by Ginsburg

Laws applied
- Railroad Revitalization and Regulatory Reform Act of 1976

CSX Transp., Inc. v. Ala. Dept. of Revenue, 562 U.S. 277 (2011), was a United States Supreme Court case in which the court held that a railroad can challenge state's sales and use taxes as discriminatory under the Railroad Revitalization and Regulatory Reform Act of 1976 when the tax in question is imposed on railroads but not their main competitors.

== Background ==
CSX is an interstate rail carrier that operates, and pays taxes, in Alabama. Alabama imposes sales and use taxes on railroads when they purchase or consume diesel fuel, but exempts their main competitors—interstate motor and water carriers. CSX sued the Alabama Department of Revenue and its Commissioner (Alabama), claiming that this tax scheme discriminates against railroads in violation of the Railroad Revitalization and Regulatory Reform Act of 1976 (4–R Act), which bars four forms of discriminatory taxation in 49 U.S.C. §11501(b). Three of the delineated prohibitions deal with property taxes, and the fourth is a catch-all provision that forbids a State to "[i]mpose another tax that discriminates against a rail carrier". The federal District Court dismissed CSX's suit as not cognizable under the 4–R Act on the basis of the Supreme Court's decision in Department of Revenue of Ore. v. ACF Industries, Inc., 510 U. S. 332, and the Eleventh Circuit Court of Appeals affirmed.

== Opinion of the court ==
The Supreme Court issued an opinion on February 22, 2011.

== Later developments ==
In 2015, the case returned to the Supreme Court in Alabama Department of Revenue v. CSX Transportation, Inc..
