= Railroad Revitalization and Regulatory Reform Act =

United States federal law

Railroad Revitalization and Regulatory Reform Act of 1976
- Other short titles: 4R Act
- Long title: An Act To improve the quality of rail services in the United States through regulatory reform, coordination of rail services and facilities, and rehabilitation and improvement financing, and for other purposes.
- Acronyms (colloquial): 4R Act
- Enacted by: the 94th United States Congress
- Effective: February 5, 1976

Citations
- Public law: Public Law 94-210
- Statutes at Large: 90 Stat. 31

Codification
- Acts amended: Interstate Commerce Act · Regional Rail Reorganization Act of 1973
- U.S.C. sections created: 45 U.S.C. ch. 17 (§ 801 et seq.) · 49 U.S.C. § 11501

Legislative history
- Introduced in the Senate as S. 2718 by D‑IN Vance Hartketh on November 26, 1975; Committee consideration by Senate Committee on Commerce · House Committee on Interstate and Foreign Commerce; Passed the Senate on December 4, 1975 (Voice vote); Passed the House as the H.R. 10979 on December 17, 1975 (Passed in lieu (House laid H.R. 10979 on table)); Reported by the joint conference committee on January 1976; agreed to by the House on January 28, 1976 (353–62 (agreed to conference report)) and by the Senate on January 28, 1976 (58–26 (agreed to conference report)); Signed into law by President Gerald Ford on February 5, 1976

Major amendments
- Staggers Rail Act (1980)

United States Supreme Court cases
- Department of Revenue of Oregon v. ACF Industries, Inc. (1994), CSX Transportation, Inc. v. Alabama Department of Revenue (2011)

The Railroad Revitalization and Regulatory Reform Act of 1976, often called the "4R Act," is a United States federal law that established the basic outlines of regulatory reform in the railroad industry and provided transitional operating funds following the 1970 bankruptcy of Penn Central Transportation Company. The law approved the "Final System Plan" for the newly created Conrail and authorized acquisition of Northeast Corridor tracks and facilities by Amtrak.

The Act was the first in a series of laws which collectively are described as the deregulation of transportation in the United States. It was followed by the Airline Deregulation Act (1978), Staggers Rail Act (1980), and the Motor Carrier Act of 1980.

== Background ==
Following the massive bankruptcy of the Penn Central in 1970, Congress created Amtrak to take over the failed company's intercity passenger train service, under the Rail Passenger Service Act. Congress passed the Regional Rail Reorganization Act of 1973 (the "3R Act") to salvage viable freight operations from Penn Central and other failing rail lines in the northeast, mid-Atlantic and midwestern regions, through the creation of Conrail. Conrail began operations in 1976.

== Summary ==
- Implementation of the Conrail "Final System Plan," as formulated by the United States Railway Association, and which specified the rail lines that Conrail would receive
- Provision of operating funds for Conrail, which had not received direct federal funds under the 3R Act. Initial funding for 1976 was $484 million (in 1986 dollars)
- Amtrak could acquire rights of way, tracks, and related facilities (such as train stations) for the Northeast Corridor (NEC) rail line between Washington, D.C. and Boston
- Initial funds were provided to Amtrak of approximately $85.2 million for the NEC acquisition.
- Federal regulation of railroads was reduced significantly for the first time since passage of the 1887 Interstate Commerce Act.

The "Declaration of policy" in the Act (Section 101), was as follows:

(a) Purpose
It is the purpose of the Congress in this Act to provide the means to rehabilitate and maintain the physical facilities, improve the operations and structure, and restore the financial stability of the railway system of the United States, and to promote the revitalization of such railway system, so that this mode of transportation will remain viable in the private sector of the economy and will be able to provide energy-efficient, ecologically compatible transportation services with greater efficiency, effectiveness, and economy, through -

(1) ratemaking and regulatory reform;
(2) the encouragement of efforts to restructure the system on a more economically justified basis, including planning authority in the Secretary of Transportation, an expedited procedure for determining whether merger and consolidation applications are in the public interest, and continuing reorganization authority;
(3) financing mechanisms that will assure adequate rehabilitation and improvement of facilities and equipment, implementation of the final system plan, and implementation of the Northeast Corridor project;
(4) transitional continuation of service on light-density rail lines that are necessary to continued employment and community well-being throughout the United States;
(5) auditing, accounting, reporting, and other requirements to protect Federal funds and to assure repayment of loans and financial responsibility; and
(6) necessary studies.

(b) Policy
It is declared to be the policy of the Congress in this Act to -

(1) balance the needs of carriers, shippers, and the public;
(2) foster competition among all carriers by railroad and other modes of transportation, to promote more adequate and efficient transportation services, and to increase the attractiveness of investing in railroads and rail-service-related enterprises;
(3) permit railroads greater freedom to raise or lower rates for rail services in competitive markets;
(4) promote the establishment of railroad rate structures which are more sensitive to changes in the level of seasonal, regional, and shipper demand;
(5) promote separate pricing of distinct rail and rail-related services;
(6) formulate standards and guidelines for determining adequate revenue levels for railroads; and
(7) modernize and clarify the functions of railroad rate bureaus.

The financial assistance provisions of the act were largely palliative and transitional. They were extended on the condition that changes in the regulatory system governing railroads be enacted, with the hope that a regulatory system which gave railroads more freedom in pricing and service arrangements, subject to greater competitive constraints, would yield a more viable industry and better service for its users. Studies of the legislative history of the Act indicate that the Gerald Ford administration secured the regulatory provisions only by threatening a veto of any act containing financial assistance for railroads but no reform of the regulatory system.

The changes in regulation provided for were as follows:

- Section 202 provided that rail rates would not be considered ‘unjust and unreasonable’ if they exceeded long run marginal costs (on the low side) and (as to the high side) applied to traffic as to which the railroads did not have ‘market dominance’ (a term related to concepts of monopoly power). The railroads were to be allowed to explore this ‘zone of reasonableness’, with presumptions against suspension or challenge of proposed rates, at a rate of 7% per year.
- Section 206 provided for, in substance, contract rates for transactions involving an investment of more than $1 million.
- Section 207 provided the Commission with authority to exempt from regulation entirely categories of traffic, upon making findings in substance that regulation was unnecessary.
- Section 208 prohibited collective rate making on movements which a rail carrier could handle entirely on its own system (‘single line rates’), and buttressed the right of ‘independent action’ by rail carriers.

In a signing statement, President Ford stated,

In addition to providing short-term financial assistance, Congress in approving this legislation has taken a fundamental step to restore the long-term economic health of this vital American industry. The regulatory reform provisions in this bill are long overdue, and I commend the Congress for this farsighted and necessary action.

This kind of fundamental change in government policy takes time. Every President since Harry S. Truman has called in vain for increased competition and reform of our regulated industries. For example, the Landis Report commissioned by President-elect Kennedy in 1960 recommended major policy revisions in transportation regulation. But for more than a quarter of a century, the Nation has had no results. In contrast, the Railroad Revitalization and Regulatory Reform Act is the first significant reform of transportation regulation by any administration--or Congress.

An equally important task facing us now is to extend the principles of reform embodied in this legislation to the aviation and motor carrier industries. In these industries, we must strive to create a regulatory climate which relies on competitive forces, rather than on inflexible and bureaucratic directives of Federal agencies, to determine which firm will provide the desired transportation services and at what price. The time has come to place greater reliance on market competition.

== Reaction ==
Many members of the ICC strongly opposed the Act. The regulatory provisions had been enacted over several commissioners' objections, and the Commission's implementation of the Act initially had little impact on the way the rail industry functioned.

When President Jimmy Carter nominated A. Daniel O'Neal, originally appointed by President Richard Nixon, to chair the ICC, O’Neal began to develop the possibilities for opening up the rail market to competition. Also, in 1978 a group of major railroads formed an organization called TRAIN (Transportation by Rail for Agricultural and Industrial Needs) to support further deregulation of the industry. The carriers' perception was that with collective rate making limited, and a Commission apparently more interested in letting their rates go down than go up, the regulatory system no longer favored them.

Large shippers of goods by rail also wished to have more flexibility in the rail market. The result of this alignment between carriers, the shippers, and the Carter administration’s ICC, was the Staggers Act of 1980. The Staggers Act extended the principles of the 4R Act. One of the key changes from the 1976 Act was allowance of secret contracts between carriers and shippers, not limited to large-investment situations and not effectively subject to regulatory review. According to former Congressional Budget Office analyst Christopher Barnekov, such contracts allowed rail carriers and shippers much to develop more efficient transport arrangements.

== See also ==
- History of rail transport in the United States
