= Bradley F. Podliska =

American author and intelligence analyst

Bradley Florian Podliska is an American author and intelligence analyst.

Podliska was motivated to serve in the military by the stories of his grandfathers, both of whom served in World War II. He graduated from University of Wisconsin, where he chaired the College Republicans, and interned with conservative media watchdog Media Research Center. He took all of the Army Reserve Officers' Training Corps courses, but found employment with the United States Department of Defense (DoD) and joined the Air Force Reserve rather than the Army. In the DoD, Podliska first worked for the Director of Intelligence for the United States Joint Forces Command in Virginia, followed by a stint at the Joint Warfare Analysis Center, and then a one-year placement in Germany conducting tactical intelligence for the United States European Command.

He received an M.A. from Georgetown University in 2001, and completed a Ph.D. at Texas A&M University in 2007. He published his doctoral dissertation, Acting Alone: United States Unilateral Uses of Force, Military Revolutions, and Hegemonic Stability Theory. In 2010, the work was revised and reissued under the title Acting Alone: A Scientific Study of American Hegemony and Unilateral Use-of-Force Decision Making. A review of the book by the Air Force Research Institute stated that "Podliska provides valuable insight into why presidents decide to act unilaterally despite the widespread belief that such actions are inherently unpopular", and concluded that "Acting Alone is a valuable contribution to the social science literature on foreign policy decision making", despite weaknesses identified in the review.

In 2008, Podliska served with the 301st Fighter Wing in Fort Worth, Texas, then deployed to Iraq as an intelligence officer with the 332d Air Expeditionary Wing. He thereafter returned to the U.S. European Command in Germany, and later returned to Washington, D.C. as a Defense Department analyst.

In September 2014, Podliska joined the United States House Select Committee on Benghazi as a staffer for the House Republican members. On June 26, 2015, and in alleged violation of USERRA, he was asked to resign, according to court documents. In October 2015, Podliska, claimed that the purpose of the committee was political, that he was retaliated against, and asked to resign—all for going on military orders and for not focusing his research on Hillary Clinton. Podliska filed a wrongful termination lawsuit in November 2015, claiming his USERRA rights were violated, that the Benghazi Committee retaliated against him for trying to enforce his USERRA rights, and that Chairman Trey Gowdy defamed him and violated his due process rights. Notably, Trey Gowdy was served with a cease and desist letter for violating the Congressional Accountability Act in publicly discussing confidential personnel and mediation issues.

According to the Benghazi Committee's court filing, Trey Gowdy also allegedly tried to strip military reservists of their USERRA rights, as Gowdy argued that firing an employee for going on military orders must be the sole motivating factor for a termination. USERRA law places less legal burden on the reservist, stating that an employee must simply show that "his or her involvement in the uniformed services was a substantial or a motivating factor in the adverse employment action taken by an employer against him or her."

On December 19, 2016, The Washington Post reported that Chairman Trey Gowdy and the Benghazi Committee settled the lawsuit with Podliska. Terms of the settlement were labelled as "secret." On December 1, 2017, The Washington Post reported that the amount of the settlement was $150,000, as listed in a report from the congressional Office of Compliance. Podliska was reinstated to his position with back pay.

In November 2018, Podliska published a book chapter on the intelligence community and congressional oversight.

In January 2023, Podliska published a textbook, Fire Alarm: The Investigation of the U.S. House Select Committee on Benghazi. In Fire Alarm, Podliska argues that both political parties use congressional investigations “to mount political attacks for electoral advantage regardless of the consequences.” With the Benghazi Committee he finds that the Republicans focused on presidential candidate Hillary Clinton at the expense of examining the White House, Department of Defense, and Intelligence Community. In doing so, the Republicans “failed to determine responsibility for U.S. policy in Libya, an accurate post-attack narrative, and why the military did not perform a timely rescue.” Former Fox News Senior News Correspondent Adam Housley wrote a favorable review of Fire Alarm, stating the book provides “game-changing details.”
