= United States Railway Association =

Former government-owned corporation

The United States Railway Association (USRA) was a government-owned corporation created by United States federal law that oversaw the creation of Conrail, a railroad corporation that would acquire and operate bankrupt and other failing freight railroads. USRA operated from 1974 to 1986.

== Legislation and establishment of USRA ==
In the Regional Rail Reorganization Act of 1973, also known as the "3R Act," Congress provided interim funding to bankrupt railroads and authorized creation of the Consolidated Rail Corporation (Conrail), another government corporation.

The 3R Act authorized the USRA to take over the powers of the Interstate Commerce Commission (ICC) with respect to allowing the bankrupt railroads to abandon unprofitable lines. The USRA was incorporated February 1, 1974, and Edward G. Jordan, an insurance executive from California, was named president on March 18 by President Richard Nixon. Arthur D. Lewis of Eastern Air Lines was appointed chairman April 30, and the rest of the board was named May 30 and sworn in July 11.

The U.S. Supreme Court affirmed the constitutionality of the 3R Act in deciding the Regional Rail Reorganization Act Cases on December 16, 1974.

== Mandate to create plan for Conrail ==
Under the 3R Act, the USRA was to create a "Final System Plan" to decide which lines should be included in the new Consolidated Rail Corporation. Unlike most railroad consolidations, only the designated lines were to be taken over; the others were to remain with the old companies along with non-rail related properties. The plan was formulated by the Association of American Railroads (AAR), an industry trade group. USRA announced a preliminary plan on February 26, 1975, and the ICC then conducted public hearings on the draft plan. USRA published the Final System Plan on July 26, 1975. The plan called for Conrail to consist of the complete Penn Central network (a conglomerate of three massive former northeastern systems — the Pennsylvania Railroad, New York Central Railroad and New York, New Haven and Hartford Railroad) as well as the following six railroads:

- Ann Arbor Railroad (bankrupt 1973)
- Erie Lackawanna Railway (1972)
- Lehigh Valley Railroad (1970)
- Reading Company (1971)
- Central Railroad of New Jersey (1967); and
- Lehigh and Hudson River Railway (1972).

Controlled railroads and jointly owned railroads such as Pennsylvania-Reading Seashore Lines were also included. (See List of railroads transferred to Conrail.) The final plan also identified certain commuter rail lines (not designated for freight service) that could be purchased by state transportation agencies from Conrail following the initial transfer. Congress approved the final plan on November 9, 1975. President Gerald Ford signed the Railroad Revitalization and Regulatory Reform Act of 1976 (the "4R Act") on February 6 of that year, which included this Final System Plan, into law.

USRA published a supplementary report in 1986 which provides a complete overview of the disposition of the affected rail lines and related properties.

== Dissolution ==
Congress abolished the USRA effective January 1, 1987.

== See also ==
- History of rail transport in the United States
