= List of preserved Conrail rolling stock =

A large quantity of rolling stock formerly owned and operated by the Consolidated Rail Corporation, known as "Conrail", have been preserved in museums, on tourist railroads, and various other locations all across North America.

== Preserved diesel locomotives ==
Image	Number	Build date	Builder	Model	Wheel arrangement	Disposition and location	Notes	References
	2181	March 1962	Electro-Motive Division (EMD)	GP30	B-B	On static display at the Reading Railroad Heritage Museum in Hamburg, Pennsylvania		
	2198	May 1963	Electro-Motive Division (EMD)	GP30	B-B	Operational at the New Hope and Ivyland Railroad in New Hope, Pennsylvania		
	2233	April 1963	Electro-Motive Division (EMD)	GP30	B-B	On static display at the Railroad Museum of Pennsylvania in Strasburg, Pennsylvania		
	2249	May 1963	Electro-Motive Division (EMD)	GP30	B-B	Operational at the Western Maryland Scenic Railroad in Cumberland, Maryland		
	5582	November 1994	Electro-Motive Division (EMD)	SD60I	C-C	Static display at the Railroaders Memorial Museum in Altoona, Pennsylvania		
	5677	November 1952	Electro-Motive Division (EMD)	GP7	B-B	Stored at the National Museum of Transportation in St. Louis, Missouri		
	6072	June 1967	Electro-Motive Division (EMD)	SD45	C-C	National Museum of Transportation in St. Louis, Missouri		
	6670	May 1969	Electro-Motive Division (EMD)	SDP45	C-C	Stored at the Virginia Museum of Transportation in Roanoke, Virginia		
	7000	October 1955	Electro-Motive Division (EMD)	GP9	B-B	Operational at the Cape May Seashore Lines in New Jersey		
	7006	October 1955	Electro-Motive Division (EMD)	GP9	B-B	On static display at the Railroad Museum of Pennsylvania in Strasburg, Pennsylvania		
	7048	December 1955	Electro-Motive Division (EMD)	GP9	B-B	On static display at the Horseshoe Curve, Altoona, Pennsylvania		
	7249	October 1957	Electro-Motive Division (EMD)	GP9	B-B	Operational at the Northern Central Railway of York in New Freedom, Pennsylvania		
	7438	April 1957	General Motors Diesel (GMD)	GP9	B-B	Operational at the Alberta Prairie Railway Excursions (APXX) at Stettler, Alberta		

=== Preserved diesel locomotive parts ===
Number	Build date	Builder	Model	Surviving part and location	Notes	References
5021	November 1983	GE Transportation (GE)	B36-7	Front number board and headlight, owned by a private owner		

== Preserved rebuilt diesel locomotives ==
Image	Number	Build date	Builder	Rebuild date	Rebuilder	Model	Wheel arrangement	Disposition and location	Notes	References
	"7544"	June 1954	Electro-Motive Division (EMD)	1974	Illinois Central Railroad (IC)'s Paducah, Kentucky shops	GP10	B-B	Operational at the Cincinnati Scenic Railway in Lebanon, Ohio	Never operated as 7544 under Conrail	
	7580	June 1957	Electro-Motive Division (EMD)	-	Illinois Central Railroad (IC)'s Paducah, Kentucky shops	GP10	B-B	Operational at the Colebrookdale Railroad in Boyertown, Pennsylvania		
	7587	October 1959	Electro-Motive Division (EMD)	-	Illinois Central Railroad (IC)'s Paducah, Kentucky shops	GP10	B-B	Operational at the Colebrookdale Railroad in Boyertown, Pennsylvania		

== Preserved electric locomotives ==
Image	Number	Build date	Builder	Model	Wheel arrangement	Disposition and location	Notes	References
	4465	July 1963	GE Transportation (GE)	E44	Static display at the Railroad Museum of Pennsylvania in Strasburg, Pennsylvania	C-C		
	4800	August 1934	GE Transportation (GE)	GG1	Static display at the Railroad Museum of Pennsylvania in Strasburg, Pennsylvania	2-C+C-2	Prototype of the GG1	

== Preserved freight cars ==
Number	Build date	Builder	Type	Disposition and Location	Notes	References
243880	1970	-	Boxcar	Static display in Shippensburg, Pennsylvania	Used as a museum by the Conrail Historical Society.	

== Formerly preserved, scrapped ==
Number	Build date	Builder	Model	Last seen	Scrap date	Cause of scrapping	Notes	References
6694	August 1970	Electro-Motive Division (EMD)	SDP45	Ronald M. Delivan Industries (RDMI) in Pittston, Pennsylvania	January 31, 2012	Poor condition		
7083	November 1956	Electro-Motive Division (EMD)	GP9	Conway Scenic Railroad in North Conway, New Hampshire	2022	Used as parts donor		
