= Conrail =

Former American Class I railroad (1976–1999)

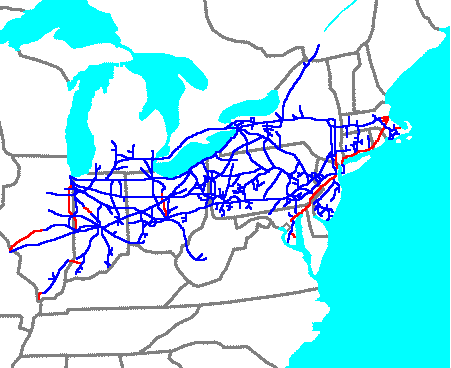
- Conrail system map with trackage rights in red

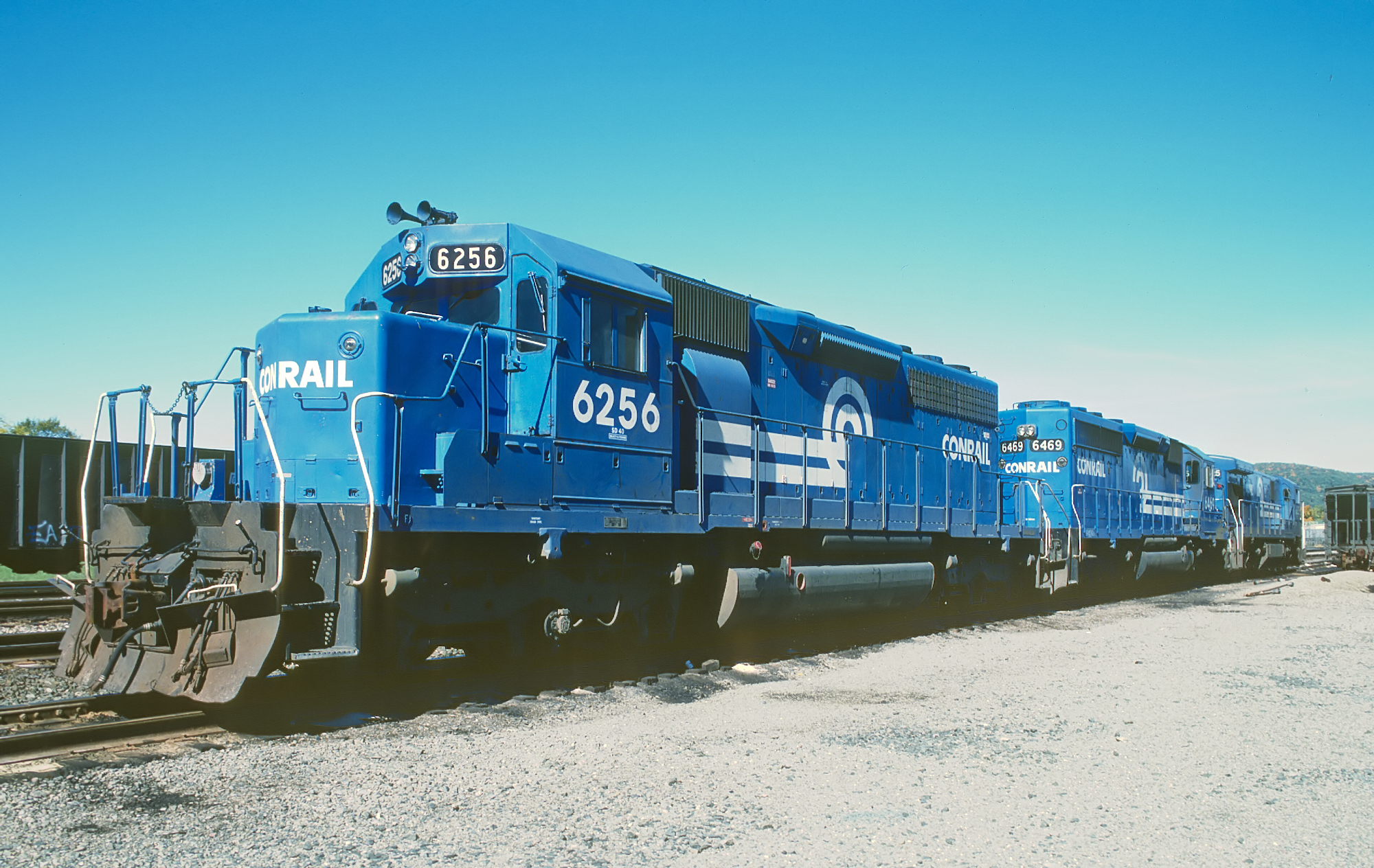
- CR 6256 and 6469 at former Erie Yard in Gang Mills, New York on October 4, 1987

Overview
- Headquarters: Philadelphia, Pennsylvania
- Reporting mark: CR
- Locale: Northeastern United States, Midwestern United States, Ontario, Quebec
- Dates of operation: April 1, 1976–June 1, 1999
- Predecessor: List: Penn Central Transportation Company Erie Lackawanna Railway Ann Arbor Railway Lehigh Valley Railroad Reading Company Central Railroad of New Jersey Lehigh and Hudson River Railway Pennsylvania-Reading Seashore Lines (merged April 1, 1976) Monongahela Railroad (merged 1993)
- Successor: List: CSX Transportation Norfolk Southern Railway Conrail Shared Assets Operations (current entity) Metro-North Railroad Indiana Southern Railroad Reading Blue Mountain and Northern Railroad Delaware Lackawanna Railroad

Technical
- Track gauge: 4 ft 8 1/2 in (1,435 mm) standard gauge
- Electrification: Portions of former PC lines

Conrail (reporting mark CR), formally the Consolidated Rail Corporation, was the primary Class I railroad in the Northeastern United States between 1976 and 1999. The trade name Conrail is a portmanteau based on the company's legal name. It continues to do business as an asset management and network services provider in three Shared Assets Areas that were excluded from the division of its operations during its acquisition by CSX Corporation and the Norfolk Southern Railway.

The federal government created Conrail to take over the potentially profitable lines of multiple bankrupt carriers, including the Penn Central Transportation Company and Erie Lackawanna Railway. After railroad regulations were lifted by the 4R Act and the Staggers Act, Conrail began to turn a profit in the 1980s and was privatized in 1987. The two remaining Class I railroads in the East, CSX Transportation and the Norfolk Southern Railway (NS), agreed in 1997 to acquire the system and split it into two roughly-equal parts (alongside three residual shared-assets areas), returning rail freight competition to the Northeast by essentially undoing the 1968 merger of the Pennsylvania Railroad and New York Central Railroad that created Penn Central. Following approval by the Surface Transportation Board, CSX and NS took control in August 1998, and on June 1, 1999, began operating their respective portions of Conrail.

The old company remains a jointly owned subsidiary, with CSX and NS owning respectively 42% and 58% of the company's shares, corresponding to how much of Conrail's assets they acquired. Each parent, however, has an equal voting interest. The primary asset retained by Conrail is ownership of the three Shared Assets Areas in New Jersey, Philadelphia, and Detroit. Both CSX and NS have the right to serve all shippers in these areas, paying Conrail for the cost of maintaining and improving trackage. They also make use of Conrail to perform switching and terminal services within the areas, but not as a common carrier, since contracts are signed between shippers and CSX or NS. Conrail also retains various support facilities including maintenance-of-way and training, as well as a 51 percent share in the Indiana Harbor Belt Railroad.

== History ==
=== Context: 1973–1976 ===
In the years leading to 1973, the freight railroad system of the Northeastern United States was collapsing. Although government-funded Amtrak took over intercity passenger services on May 1, 1971, railroad companies continued to lose money due to declining industrial business, competition from other transportation modes, high labor and costs, expensive government regulations, and other factors.

The largest railroad in the region, Penn Central (PC), declared bankruptcy in 1970, after less than three years of existence. Formed in 1968 by the merger of the New York Central Railroad and Pennsylvania Railroad (and a further merger with the New York, New Haven and Hartford Railroad in 1969), the PC was created with almost no plans or ability to merge the varied corporate cultures; the merged company suffered from a lack of cohesion, destructive internal competition, and operations that were a tangled mess. At its lowest point, PC was losing over $1 million a day and the control system was 'losing' trains all over the railroad.

In 1972, Hurricane Agnes damaged the rundown Northeast railway network and threatened the solvency of other railroads, including the somewhat more solvent Erie Lackawanna (EL). In mid-1973, officials with the bankrupt Penn Central threatened to liquidate and cease operations by year's end if they did not receive government aid by October 1. This threat to US freight and passenger traffic galvanized Congress to quickly create a bill to nationalize the bankrupt railroads. The Association of American Railroads, which opposed nationalization, submitted an alternate proposal for a government-funded private company. Judge Fullam forced the Penn Central to operate into 1974, when, on January 2, after threatening a veto, President Richard Nixon signed the Regional Rail Reorganization Act of 1973 into law. The "3R Act," as it was called, provided interim funding to the bankrupt railroads and defined a new Consolidated Rail Corporation under the Association of American Railroads' plan.

The 3R Act also formed the United States Railway Association (USRA), another government corporation, taking over the powers of the Interstate Commerce Commission with respect to allowing the bankrupt railroads to abandon unprofitable lines. The USRA was incorporated on February 1, 1974, and Edward G. Jordan, an insurance executive from California, was named president on March 18 by Nixon. Arthur D. Lewis of Eastern Air Lines was appointed chairman on April 30, and the remainder of the board was named on May 30 and sworn in on July 11.

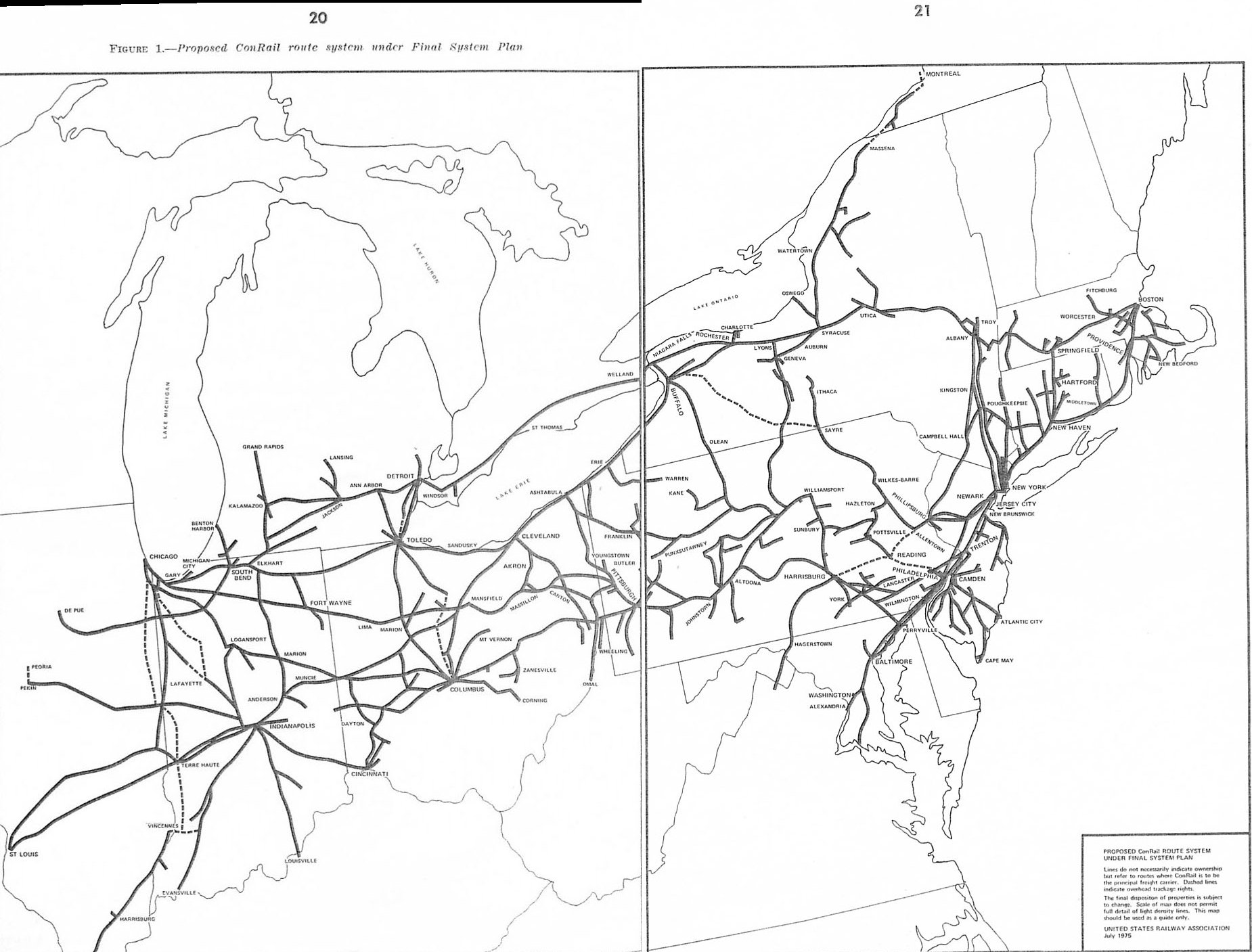
The 1975 Final System Plan left major parts of the Erie Lackawanna Railway and Reading Company out of Conrail

Under the 3R Act, the USRA was to create a "Final System Plan" to decide which lines should be included in the new Consolidated Rail Corporation. Unlike most railroad consolidations, only the designated lines were to be taken over. Other lines would be sold to Amtrak, various state governments, transportation agencies, and solvent railroads. The few remaining lines were to remain with the old companies along with all previously abandoned lines, many stations, and all non-rail related properties, thus converting most of the old companies into solvent property-holding companies. The plan was unveiled on July 26, 1975, consisting of lines from Penn Central and six other companies—the Ann Arbor Railroad (bankrupt 1973), Erie Lackawanna Railway (1972), Lehigh Valley Railroad (1970), Reading Company (1971), Central Railroad of New Jersey (1967) and Lehigh and Hudson River Railway (1972). Controlled railroads and jointly owned railroads such as Pennsylvania-Reading Seashore Lines and the Raritan River Railroad (1980) were also included (See list of railroads transferred to Conrail for a full list). It was approved by Congress on November 9, and on February 5, 1976, President Gerald Ford signed the Railroad Revitalization and Regulatory Reform Act of 1976, which included this Final System Plan, into law.

The EL had been formed in 1960 as a merger of the Erie Railroad and Delaware, Lackawanna and Western Railroad. It too was bankrupt, but was somewhat stronger financially than the others. It was ruled reorganizable under Chapter 77 on April 30, 1974 (as had the Boston and Maine Railroad), but on January 9, 1975, with no end to its losses in sight, its trustees reconsidered and asked for inclusion. The Final System Plan assigned a major section of the EL, from northern New Jersey west to northeast Ohio, to be sold to the Chessie System, which would help spur competition in Conrail's territory. Chessie, however, could not reach an agreement with EL labor unions, and in February 1976 announced that it would not be buying the EL section. The USRA hurriedly assigned large amounts of trackage rights to the Delaware and Hudson Railway, allowing it to compete in the Philadelphia, Pennsylvania, and Washington, D.C., markets. The State of Michigan decided to keep operational the full Ann Arbor Railroad, of which Conrail would run only the southernmost portion. Michigan bought it and the whole line was operated by Conrail for several years until it was sold to a short line.

=== Operation: 1976–1986 ===
Conrail was incorporated in Pennsylvania on October 25, 1974, and operations began on April 1, 1976. The federal government owned 85%, with employees owning the remaining 15%. The theory was that if the service was improved through increased capital investment, the economic basis of the railroad would be improved. During its first seven years, Conrail proved to be highly unprofitable, despite receiving billions of dollars of assistance from Congress. The corporation declared enormous losses on its federal income tax returns from 1976 through 1982, resulting in an accumulated net operating loss of $2.2 billion during that period. Congress once again reacted with support by passing the Northeast Rail Service Act of 1981 (NERSA), which amended portions of the 3R Act by exempting Conrail from liability for any state taxes and requiring the Secretary of Transportation to make arrangements for the sale of the government's interest in Conrail. After NERSA was implemented, Conrail, under the aggressive leadership of L. Stanley Crane (Note: L. Stanley Crane (born in Cincinnati, 1915) raised in Washington, lived in McLean before moving to Philadelphia in 1981. He began his career with Southern Railway after graduating from The George Washington University with a chemical engineering degree in 1938. He worked for the railroad, except for a stint from 1959 to 1961 with the Pennsylvania Railroad, until reaching the company's mandatory retirement age in 1980. Crane went to Conrail in 1981 after a distinguished career that had seen him rise to the position of CEO at the Southern Railway. He died of pneumonia on July 15, 2003, at a hospice in Boynton Beach, Florida.) began to improve and reported taxable income between $2 million and $314 million each year from 1983 through 1986.

Conrail's government-funded rebuilding of the dilapidated infrastructure and rolling stock it inherited from its six predecessors succeeded by the end of the 1970s in improving the physical condition of tracks, locomotives and freight cars. However, fundamental economic regulatory issues remained, and Conrail continued to post losses of as much as $1 million a day. Conrail management, recognizing the need for more regulatory freedoms to address the economic issues, were among the parties lobbying for what became the Staggers Act of 1980, which significantly loosened the Interstate Commerce Commission's rigid economic control of the rail industry. This allowed Conrail and other carriers the opportunity to become profitable and strengthen their finances.

The Staggers Act allowed the setting of rates that would recover capital and operating cost (fully allocated cost recovery) by each and every route mile the railroad operated. There would be no more cross-subsidization of costs between route-miles (that is, revenue on profitable route segments were not used to subsidize routes where rates were set at intermodal parity, yet still did recover fully allocated costs). Finally, where current and/or future traffic projections showed that profitable volumes of traffic would not return, the railroads were allowed to abandon those routes, shippers and passengers to other modes of transportation. Under the Staggers Act, railroads, including Conrail, were freed from the requirement to continue money-losing services.

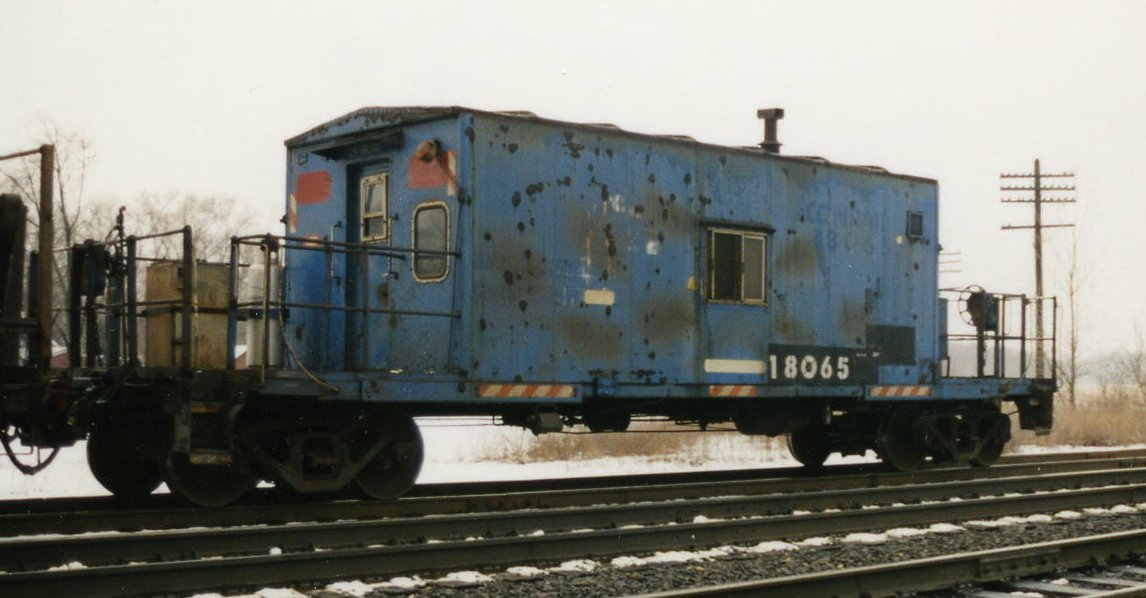
Conrail transfer caboose 18065 brings up the rear of a local freight passing Porter, Indiana, in the early 1990s

Conrail began turning a profit by 1981, the result of the Staggers Act freedoms and its own managerial improvements under the leadership of L. Stanley Crane, who had been chief executive officer of the Southern Railway. While the Staggers Act helped immensely in allowing all railroads to more-easily abandon unprofitable rail lines and set their own freight rates, it was under Crane's leadership that Conrail truly became a profitable operation. Soon after Crane took office in 1981 he shed another 4,400 miles from the Conrail system in the following two years, which accounted for only 1% of the railroad's overall traffic and 2% of its revenue while saving it millions of dollars in maintenance costs. NERSA relieved Conrail of its requirement to provide commuter service on the Northeast Corridor, further improving its finances.

In 1984, the government put its 85% share up for sale. Bids were received from Alleghany Corporation, Citibank, an employee buyout, Guilford Transportation Industries, Norfolk Southern Railway and a consortium headed by J. Willard Marriott. On February 8, 1985, Secretary of Transportation Elizabeth Dole announced Norfolk Southern Railway as the successful bidder.

After considerable debate in Congress, the Conrail Privatization Act of 1986 was signed into law by President Reagan on October 21, 1986. However, in August 1986, Norfolk Southern had withdrawn its bid citing Congressional delays and taxation changes. The government decided that its interest in Conrail would then be sold off on the stock exchange, by the then-largest initial public offering in US history. The sale was effective from March 26, 1987, when Conrail's stock, worth $1.65 billion, was sold to private investors.

==== Passenger rail operations ====
Conrail inherited the commuter rail operations of its predecessor lines. It relinquished several during the 1970s, including the Erie Cleveland–Youngstown service (discontinued in 1977), the Pennsylvania Railroad Chicago–Valparaiso service (transferred to Amtrak in 1979), and the services within the Massachusetts Bay Transportation Authority service district (transferred to the Boston and Maine Railroad, under contract to the MBTA, in March 1977). Pursuant to the Northeast Rail Service Act of 1981, Conrail operated the remainder until 1983 when these services were transferred to state or metropolitan transit authorities. The transit authorities purchased the track and right-of-way on which their commuter operations ran, leaving Conrail freight operations as a tenant.

Passenger services in September 1976, other "Suburban services" denoted with "(s)"
| Locale | Line | Train / line names (1976) | Predecessor company | Final service | Successor company |
|---|---|---|---|---|---|
| New York City | New York–Poughkeepsie | Hudson Line | New York Central (PC) | December 31, 1982 | Metro-North |
| New York City | New York–Dover Plains | Harlem Line | New York Central (PC) | December 31, 1982 | Metro-North |
| New York City | New York–New Haven | | New York, New Haven & Hartford (PC) | December 31, 1982 | Metro-North |
| New York City | New York–New Canaan (s) | | New York, New Haven & Hartford (PC) | December 31, 1982 | Metro-North |
| New York City | New York–Danbury | | New York, New Haven & Hartford (PC) | December 31, 1982 | Metro-North |
| New York City | New York–Waterbury | | New York, New Haven & Hartford (PC) | December 31, 1982 | Metro-North |
| New York City | Hoboken–Port Jervis | Main Line / Bergen County Line | Erie Lackawanna | December 31, 1982 | NJ Transit / Metro-North |
| New York City | Hoboken–Netcong (s) | Boonton Line | Erie Lackawanna | December 31, 1982 | NJ Transit / Metro-North |
| New York City | Hoboken–Spring Valley (s) | Pascack Valley Line | Erie Railroad (EL) | December 31, 1982 | NJ Transit / Metro-North |
| New York City | Hoboken–Dover (s) | Morristown Line | Delaware, Lackawanna & Western (EL) | December 31, 1982 | NJ Transit |
| New York City | Hoboken–Gladstone (s) | Gladstone Branch | Delaware, Lackawanna & Western (EL) | December 31, 1982 | NJ Transit |
| New York City | Hoboken-Montclair | Montclair Branch | Delaware, Lackawanna & Western (EL) | December 31, 1982 | NJ Transit |
| New York City | New York–Trenton (s) | | Pennsylvania Railroad (PC) | December 31, 1982 | NJ Transit |
| New York City | Princeton Junction–Princeton (s) | "Princeton Dinkey" | Pennsylvania Railroad (PC) | December 31, 1982 | NJ Transit |
| New York City | New York–Bay Head (s) | New York and Long Branch District (North Jersey Coast Line as of 1978) | Central of New Jersey / Pennsylvania Railroad (PC) | December 31, 1982 | NJ Transit |
| New York City | Newark, NJ–Phillipsburg (s) | CNJ District (Raritan Valley Line as of 1978) Western Hills Express (5703) | Central of New Jersey | December 31, 1982 | NJ Transit |
| New York City | Cranford–Bayonne (s) | "Bayonne Scoot" | Central of New Jersey | August 6, 1978 | discontinued |
| Washington, D.C. / Baltimore | Baltimore–Washington (s) | | Pennsylvania Railroad (PC) | December 31, 1982 | Amtrak (MDOT) |
| Philadelphia | Philadelphia–Chestnut Hill (s) | (Chestnut Hill West as of October 1976) | Pennsylvania Railroad (PC) | December 31, 1982 | SEPTA |
| Philadelphia | Philadelphia–Harrisburg (s) | | Pennsylvania Railroad (PC) | December 31, 1982 | SEPTA |
| Philadelphia | Philadelphia–Manayunk (s) | | Pennsylvania Railroad (PC) | December 31, 1982 | SEPTA |
| Philadelphia | Philadelphia–Newark, DE (s) | | Pennsylvania Railroad (PC) | December 31, 1982 | SEPTA |
| Philadelphia | Philadelphia–Trenton (s) | | Pennsylvania Railroad (PC) | December 31, 1982 | SEPTA |
| Philadelphia | Philadelphia–West Chester (s) | | Pennsylvania Railroad (PC) | December 31, 1982 | SEPTA |
| Philadelphia | Philadelphia–Chestnut Hill (s) | (Chestnut Hill East as of October 1976) | Reading Company | December 31, 1982 | SEPTA |
| Philadelphia | Philadelphia–Doylestown (s) | | Reading Company | December 31, 1982 | SEPTA |
| Philadelphia | Philadelphia–Newtown (s) | | Reading Company | December 31, 1982 | SEPTA |
| Philadelphia | Philadelphia–Warminster (s) | | Reading Company | December 31, 1982 | SEPTA |
| Philadelphia | Philadelphia–Bethlehem | | Reading Company | July 26, 1981 | discontinued |
| Philadelphia | Philadelphia–Pottsville | | Reading Company | July 26, 1981 | discontinued |
| Philadelphia | Lindenwold–Atlantic City | | Pennsylvania Railroad / Reading Company (PRSL) | June 30, 1982 | NJ Transit |
| Philadelphia | Lindenwold–Cape May | | Pennsylvania Railroad / Reading Company (PRSL) | September 13, 1981 | discontinued |
| Philadelphia | Lindenwold–Ocean City | | Pennsylvania Railroad / Reading Company (PRSL) | August 13, 1981 | discontinued |
| New York City / Philadelphia | Philadelphia–Newark, NJ | Crusader, Wall Street | Reading Company | December 31, 1982 (Philadelphia–West Trenton) | SEPTA |
| New York City / Philadelphia | Philadelphia–Newark, NJ | Crusader, Wall Street | Central of New Jersey / Reading Company | December 3, 1982 (West Trenton–Newark, NJ) | discontinued |
| New York City / Philadelphia | Philadelphia–Newark, NJ | Crusader, Wall Street | Central of New Jersey / Reading Company | July 30, 1981 (Crusader and Wall Street) | discontinued |
| Buffalo | Buffalo–Welland | Toronto, Hamilton and Buffalo Railway | New York Central (PC) | April 25, 1981 | discontinued |
| Chicago | Chicago–Valparaiso | | Pennsylvania Railroad (PC) | October 29, 1979 | Amtrak |
| Boston | Boston–Franklin (s) | | New York, New Haven & Hartford (PC) | June 30, 1977 | Boston & Maine / MBTA |
| Boston | Boston–Needham (s) | | New York, New Haven & Hartford (PC) | June 30, 1977 | Boston & Maine / MBTA |
| Boston | Boston–Providence (s) | | New York, New Haven & Hartford (PC) | June 30, 1977 | Boston & Maine / MBTA |
| Boston | Boston–Stoughton (s) | | New York, New Haven & Hartford (PC) | June 30, 1977 | Boston & Maine / MBTA |
| Boston | Boston–Framingham (s) | | New York Central (PC) | June 30, 1977 | Boston & Maine / MBTA |
| Providence | Providence–Westerly | | New York, New Haven & Hartford (PC) | June 3, 1977 | discontinued |
| Cleveland | Cleveland–Youngstown | | Erie Railroad (EL) | January 14, 1977 | discontinued |

=== Breakup: 1997–1999 ===
With Conrail's increasing success, it decided to merge the company with another railroad, so it approached CSX Transportation about buying Conrail. CSX's bid for Conrail, however, drew the attention of Norfolk Southern Railway which, fearing that CSX would come to dominate rail traffic in the eastern US, made a bid of its own leading to a takeover battle between the two railroads. In 1997, however, the two railroads struck a compromise agreement to jointly acquire Conrail and split most of its assets between them, with Norfolk Southern acquiring a larger portion of the Conrail network via a larger stock buyout. Under the final agreement approved by the Surface Transportation Board, Norfolk Southern acquired 58 percent of Conrail's assets, including roughly 6,000 Conrail route miles, and CSX received 42 percent of Conrail's assets, including about 3,600 route miles.

The buyout was approved by the Surface Transportation Board (STB) (successor agency to the Interstate Commerce Commission (ICC)) and took place on August 22, 1998. Under the control of lawyer-turned-CEO Tim O'Toole, the lines were transferred to two newly formed limited liability companies, to be subsidiaries of Conrail but leased to CSX and Norfolk Southern, respectively New York Central Lines (NYC) and Pennsylvania Lines (PRR). The NYC and PRR reporting marks, which had passed to Conrail, were also transferred to the new companies, and NS also acquired the CR reporting mark. Operations under CSX and NS began on June 1, 1999, bringing Conrail's 23-year existence to an end.

As the names indicated, CSX acquired the former New York Central Railroad main line from New York City and Boston, Massachusetts, to Cleveland, Ohio, and the former Cleveland, Cincinnati, Chicago and St. Louis Railway (NYC Big Four) line to Indianapolis, Indiana (continuing west to East St. Louis, Illinois) on a former Pittsburgh, Cincinnati, Chicago and St. Louis Railroad (PRR Panhandle Route line), while Norfolk Southern got the former Pennsylvania Railroad main line and Cleveland and Pittsburgh Railroad from Jersey City, New Jersey, to Cleveland, and the rest of the former NYC main line west to Chicago, Illinois. Thus the Conrail "X" was neatly split in two, CSX getting one diagonal from Boston to St. Louis and Norfolk Southern the other from New York to Chicago. The two lines cross at a bridge southeast of downtown Cleveland (41.447°N 81.627°W), where the former Cleveland and Pittsburgh Railroad crosses over the NYC's former Cleveland Short Line Railway around the south side of Cleveland.

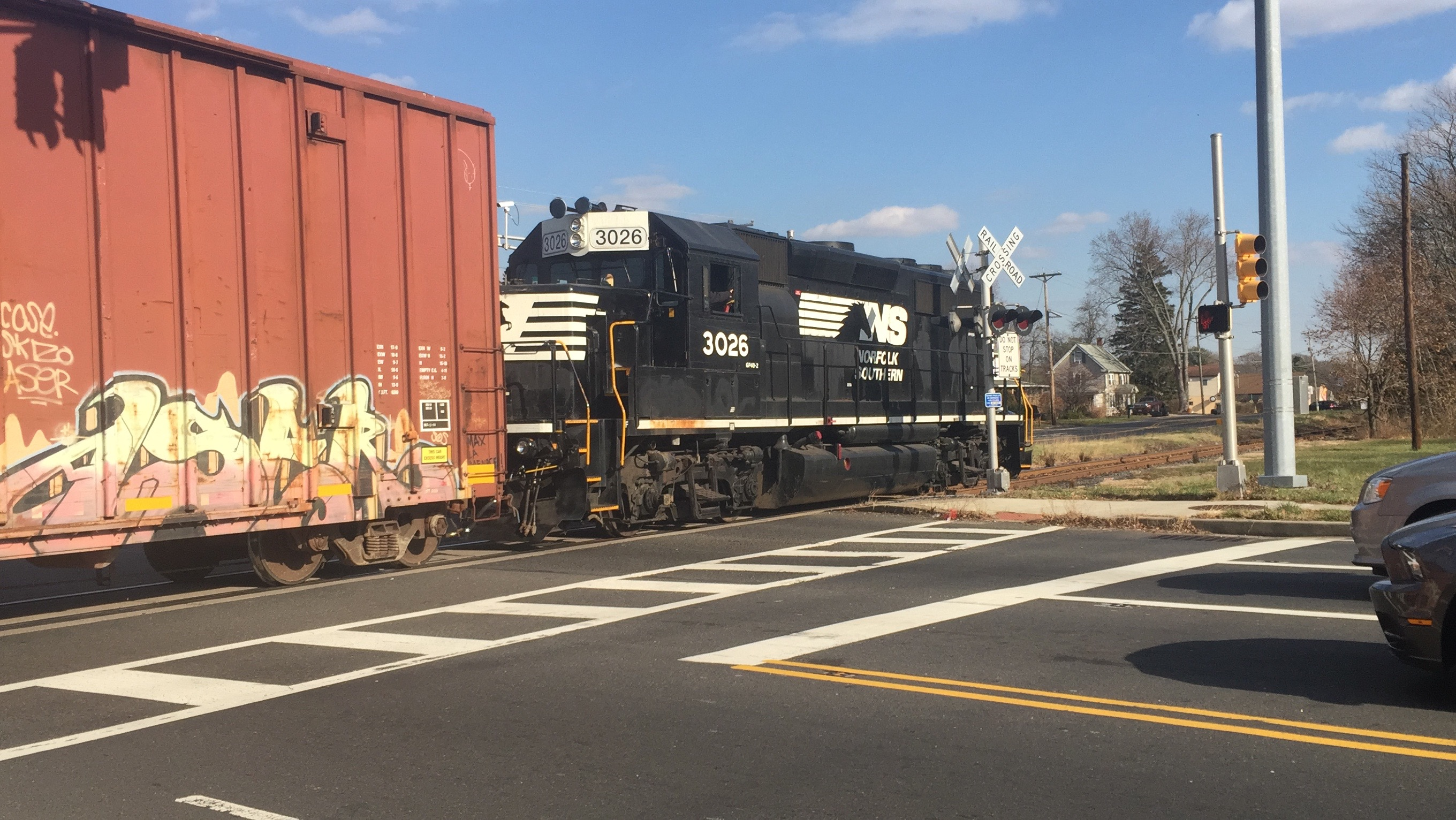
Conrail Shared Assets is jointly owned by CSX and NS, and uses locomotives from both companies

In three major metropolitan areas – North Jersey, South Jersey/Philadelphia, and Detroit – Conrail Shared Assets Operations continues to serve as a terminal operating company owned by both CSX and NS. The Conrail Shared Assets Operations arrangement was a concession made to federal regulators who were concerned about the lack of competition in certain rail markets and logistical problems associated with the breaking-up of Conrail operations as they existed in densely populated areas with many local customers. The smaller Conrail operation that exists today serves rail freight customers in these markets on behalf of its two owners. A fourth area, the former Monongahela Railway in southwest Pennsylvania, was originally owned jointly by the Baltimore and Ohio Railroad, Pennsylvania Railroad and Pittsburgh and Lake Erie Railroad. Conrail absorbed the company in 1993, and assigned trackage rights to CSX, the successor to the B&O and P&LE. With the Conrail breakup, those lines are owned by NS, but the CSX trackage rights are still in place.

== Locomotives ==
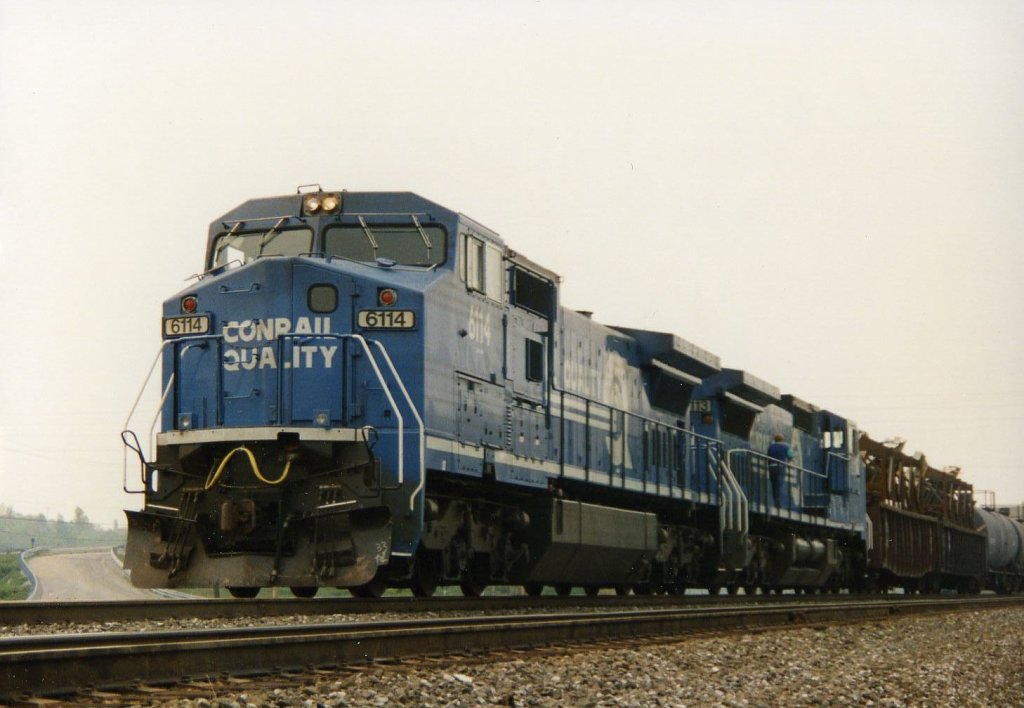
Conrail 6114, a GE Dash 8-40CW, leads a train westbound out of Altoona, Pennsylvania.

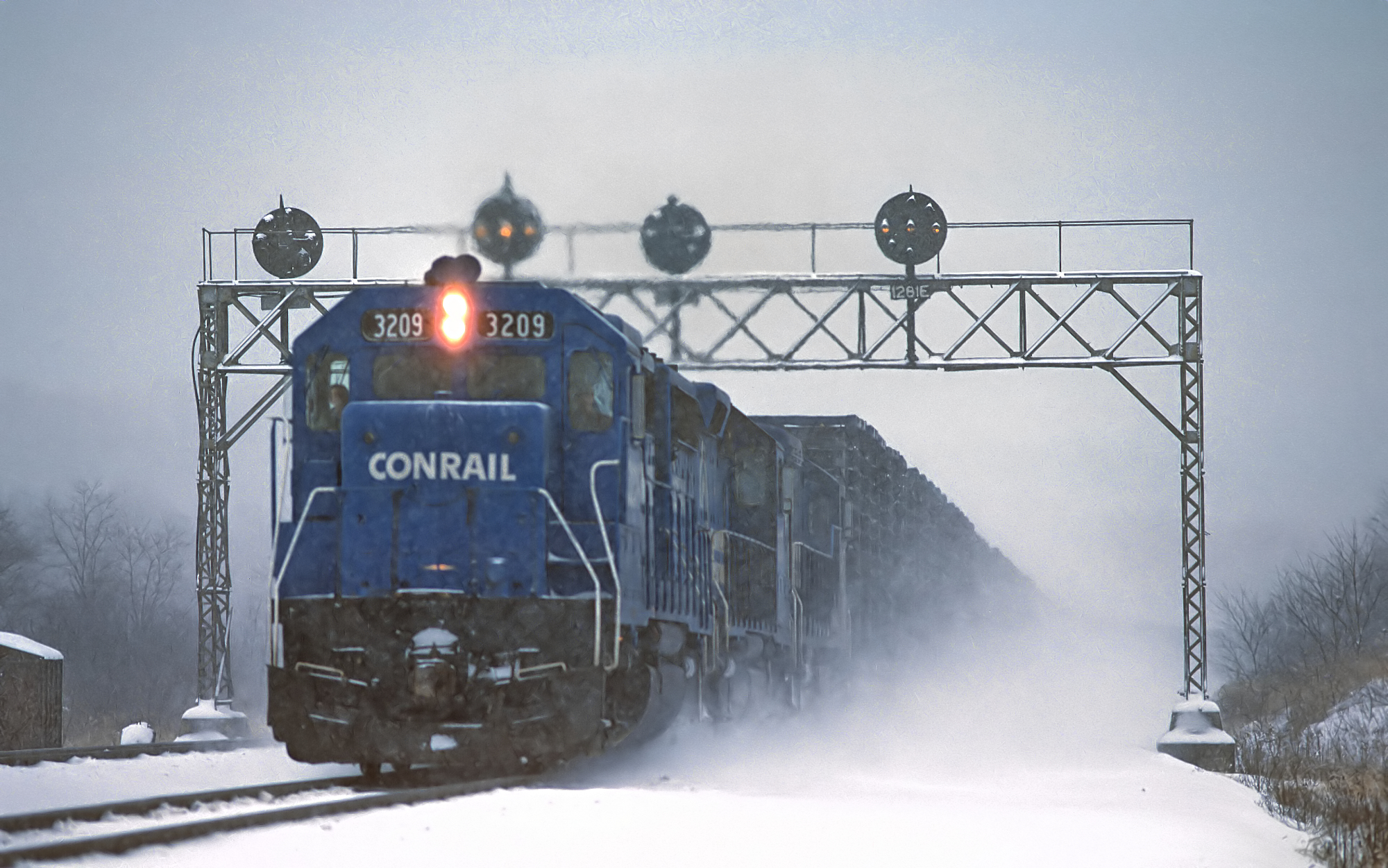
A Conrail train led by EMD GP40 3209 at Duncannon, Pennsylvania

Since Conrail was divided between Norfolk Southern Railway and CSX Transportation in 1999, all remaining locomotives have been successively repainted, and many remain in service. CR units had unique features such as "Bright Future" blue paint, flashing ditch lights, and Leslie RS-3L horns. Another key spotting feature is ditch lights mounted under the locomotive's front deck. This is a preference different from Norfolk Southern and CSX, which order locomotives with the lights above the deck. Red marker lights (not class lights, which are multi-color) were also a preference of Conrail. Most locomotives that went to CSX retained their marker lights, while Norfolk Southern quickly removed them. All Conrail locomotives that went to CSX and NS have been either retired or repainted. The last unit to wear "Conrail Blue", NS 8312, was retired in 2014.

Conrail was the only railroad to receive EMD SD80MACs (an order from the Chicago & North Western was cancelled when that company merged with Union Pacific) and were separated evenly between CSX and NS. Conrail had a different paint scheme for these locomotives and also the SD70MAC, with a large white, cone-shaped line on the front, bearing "Conrail Quality" lettering. The SD70MACs were not fitted with marker lights, as they were ordered after the Conrail breakup was agreed upon, and neither NS or CSX wanted 'their' locomotives to be equipped with markers. Similarly, the standard-cab SD70, Conrail's final order of locomotives, were ordered to NS specifications, and were in Norfolk Southern's preferred numbering series (the 2500's), which they retained after the breakup.

== Signals ==
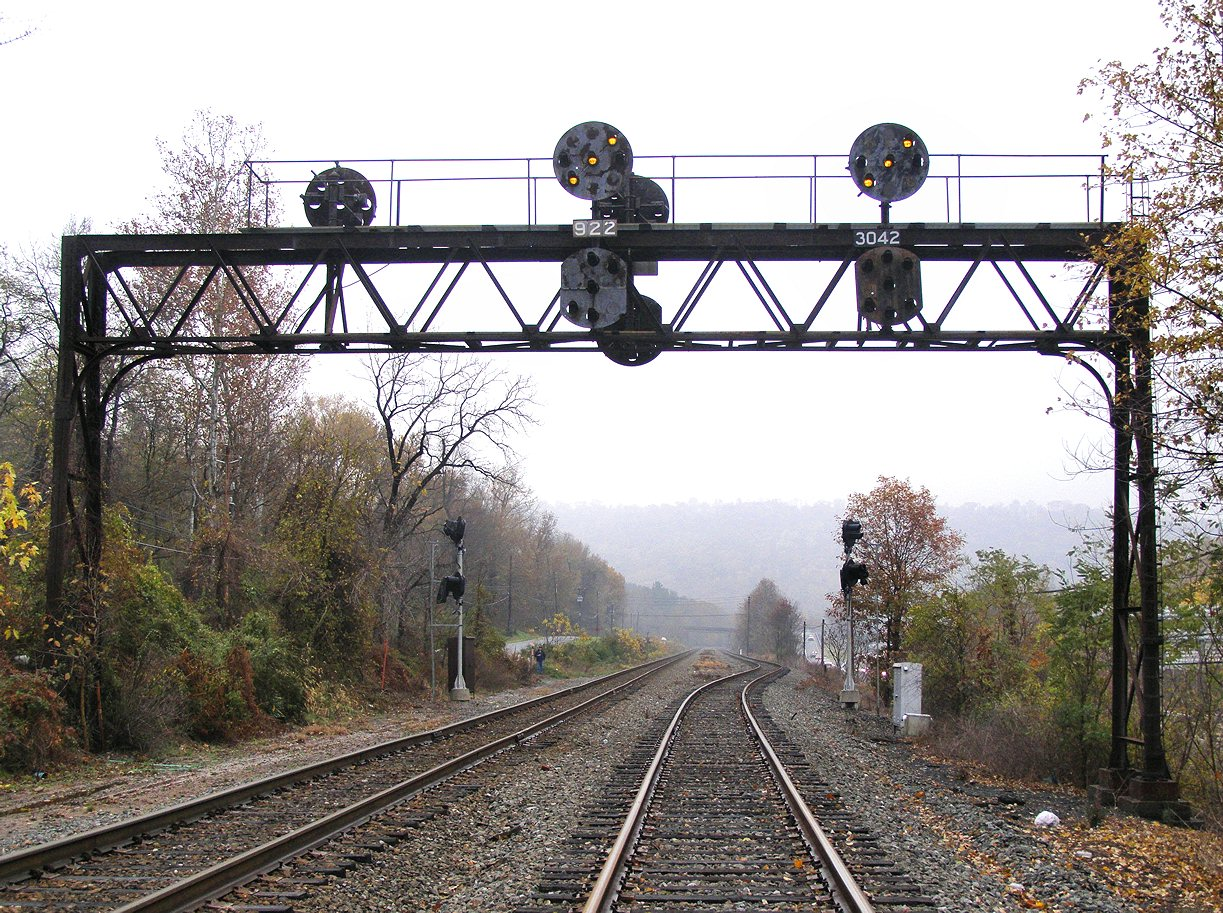
PRR position light signal

When Conrail was formed, it acquired many different railways, and as typical in the North American rail industry, signaling was not standardized between these railways. This caused problems for Conrail, which had to "qualify" train crews on as many as seven different signaling systems and operating rules. The varying systems included the PRR position light signals, the NYC searchlight signals and tri-light signals, and the EL tri-light and semaphore signals.

Conrail, and other eastern railroads which required multiple operating rules, came up with a standardized rulebook called Northeast Operating Rules Advisory Committee (NORAC). This significantly increased operational flexibly, allowing crews to operate on any territory they were qualified on, instead of additionally needing multiple operating rules qualifications. Additionally, standardized signal rules allowed Conrail to standardize signaling hardware and operation across its system.

In the early years of Conrail, the NYC "small-back" searchlight was adopted as the systemwide standard for new signal installations and replacements. The standard signal was quickly changed to the NYC tri-light. This move was done to decrease maintenance requirements, as searchlight signals need moving parts to switch between colors, unlike tri-lights, which have individual lamps. Many signals from previous railroads were re-used though, as new signaling hardware was expensive, and Conrail faced financial difficulty.

As mentioned above, significant projects took place to reduce trackage, oftentimes removing double-track with automatic block signals in favor of single track with centralized traffic control (CTC). Conrail also installed CTC across much of the former PRR multi-track mainline, which had relied on local towers to operate signals and control track. Conrail spent its entire existence installing tri-light signals (using NORAC rules) across much of its system. Many Conrail-installed signaling locations were removed in the 2010s, as railroads upgraded their signals for Positive Train Control compliance.

Today, most Northeastern railroads associated with former Conrail lines have maintained standardization of all systems as vertical color light signals using NORAC rules. Conrail Shared Assets Operations continues to use the tri-light as its standard signal type. Amtrak uses a colorized version of PRR position light signals called "Position Color Lights".

== Preservation ==
The Conrail Historical Society, Inc.
- Founded: 1995
- Type: 501(c)(3)
- Location: Shippensburg, Pennsylvania
- Members: 400+
- Website: www.thecrhs.org

The Conrail Historical Society, Inc., is a 501(c)(3) non-profit organization based in Shippensburg, Pennsylvania. The society aims to preserve and restore equipment, items pertaining to, and photographs of Conrail specifically and of American railroading in general. As of 2022, the group publishes a quarterly magazine and a calendar, as well as other occasional mailings. Previous conventions have been held in Altoona, Pennsylvania, Philadelphia, Cleveland, and Warren, Ohio. More recent preservation activities include completion of the cosmetic restoration of N7E caboose 21165 and a partnership with the B&O Railroad Museum to restore its ex-Conrail SW7 8905.

The CRHS owns four pieces of on-track equipment: 86-foot boxcar 243880 (currently under development into a stand-alone Conrail museum), cabooses 21165 and 22130, and former Triple Crown RoadRailer TCSZ 463491. A preserved Conrail ex-PRR GP30 is on display at the Railroad Museum of Pennsylvania.

=== Heritage units ===
To mark its 30th anniversary, Norfolk Southern painted 20 new locomotives with the paint schemes of predecessor railroads. The first, on March 15, 2012, was GE ES44AC #8098 in Conrail blue with the "can opener" logo.

In July 2023, CSX unveiled GE ES44AH unit #1976, which was repainted at the CSX shops in Waycross, GA with a CSX dark blue and yellow color scheme on the front (nose) and cab of the locomotive, and the light blue Conrail scheme with the Conrail Quality logo throughout the rest of the locomotive. It was numbered #1976 in homage to the year of Conrail's creation.

In August 2023, MTA Metro–North Railroad unveiled locomotive #201, a GE P32AC-DM, wrapped in a yellow and blue scheme worn by Conrail's EMD FL9 units between 1976 and 1982.

In May 2024, SEPTA unveiled Silverliner IV #304 with a heritage Conrail logo as part of their celebration of the Silverliner IV cars' 50th anniversary. SEPTA stated that several of their Reading Railroad-acquired Silverliner IVs wore a Conrail logo from 1976 to 1981.

In October 2024, New Jersey Transit unveiled EMD GP40PH-2B #4208 in Conrail blue with the "can opener" logo, similar to Norfolk Southern #8098. NJT stated that Conrail was the predecessor to NJ Transit Rail Operations and that many of the original lines, stations and rolling stock were inherited from Conrail in 1983.

== See also ==
- Defunct railroads of North America
- History of rail transportation in the United States
- List of companies transferred to Conrail
- Railroad Development Corporation
- List of preserved Conrail rolling stock
