= Uniformed Services Employment and Re-employment Rights Act of 1994 =

United States federal law on military

United States Supreme Court cases
- Staub v. Proctor Hospital, 562 U.S. 411 (2011); Torres v. Texas Department of Public Safety, No. 20-603, 597 U.S. ___ (2022)

The Uniformed Services Employment and Reemployment Rights Act of 1994 (USERRA, Pub. L. 103–353, codified as amended at 38 U.S.C. §§ 4301–4335) was passed by U.S. Congress and signed into law by U.S. President Bill Clinton on October 13, 1994 to protect the civilian employment of active and reserve military personnel in the United States called to active duty. The law applies to all United States uniformed services and their respective reserve components.

== General purpose ==
USERRA clarifies and strengthens the Veterans' Reemployment Rights (VRR) Statute by protecting civilian job rights and benefits for veterans, members of reserve components, and even individuals activated by the President of the United States to provide Federal Response for National Emergencies. USERRA also makes major improvements in protecting service member rights and benefits by clarifying the law, improving enforcement mechanisms, and adding Federal Government employees to those employees already eligible to receive U.S. Department of Labor assistance in processing claims of noncompliance.

Throughout its history, the United States government has enacted legislation protecting the men and women who serve in times of armed conflict. During the Civil War, Congress passed legislation protecting service members from legal proceedings they could not attend due to their military commitment. Congress passed the Soldiers' and Sailors' Civil Relief Act during World War I as a means of offering similar protections to service members fighting in Europe. Shortly before the United States entered World War II, Congress passed the Selective Training and Service Act of 1940.

The rationale behind the law lay partly in providing a means for drafted individuals to return to their jobs at the cessation of hostilities. After the war, the United States Supreme Court upheld the spirit of the law's protections in Fishgold v. Sullivan Drydock 328 U.S. 275,284 (1946) when it held that the Act allowed the reemployment of an employee drafted to fight the war.

The Supreme Court in Fishgold not only allowed the reemployment of a service person but also held that, with regards to advancement opportunities the service person missed while serving abroad, the service person "step[ped] back on at the precise point he would have occupied had he kept his position continuously during the war." The Court further held that the Act be "liberally construed" to aid those who left their occupations to serve their country during a time of great peril. The Court rationalized its holdings by stating that a citizen called to defend the United States should not, upon discharge, be hindered from advancement in their civilian job because of the service-related absence. The Court further noted that the returning veteran was "to gain by his service for his country an advantage which the law withheld from those who stayed behind."

The holding, requiring that legislation providing protections to uniformed service members be "liberally construed," is affirmatively followed by courts and the Department of Labor in construing USERRA today.

At the end of World War II, a federal court in the State of Washington decided a case similar to Fishgold. In Niemiec v. Seattle Rainier Baseball Club, Inc., 67 F. Supp. 705, 711 (W.D. Wash. 1946), the court applied Fishgold's holding by requiring a professional baseball club (now the Seattle Mariners) to rehire a former player who was absent from the team for three years because of World War II required service. While acknowledging "the seriousness to baseball of having the judge dictate as to the team's players," the judge concluded his opinion stating that had the veteran and his comrades failed in their service overseas "there would be no American manager of any baseball if such should be played at the stadium this year. If the Nazis permitted baseball, it would not be an exhibition that any of us liked."

As the threat of the Axis powers passed, Congress used the geopolitical realities of the Cold War to justify further veteran-friendly legislation. During the Cold War, the Selective Service and Training Act of 1940 underwent a series of modifications including the Selective Service Act of 1948 and the Universal Military Training and Service Act of 1967. The protections set out in the Selective Service and Training Act of 1940 generally remained the same while the modifications supported the conscript-based military of the Cold War era.

Reservists received their first affirmative statutory protection as part of an amendment to the Military Selective Service Act in 1968 often referred to as the Veterans' Reemployment Rights Act ("VRRA"). The VRRA protects reservists against reemployment discrimination caused by their military duty. The Veterans' Readjustment Assistance Act of 1974 re-codified provisions of VRRA but included similar provisions protecting reservists from employment discrimination with an emphasis on inducing individuals separating from active military service to serve in the reserve components of the post-Vietnam all volunteer military.

Congress, in enacting these protections, recognized reservists were experiencing increased discrimination from employers because reservists were required to "attend weekly drills or summer training. Expanding VRRA legislation to cover reservists soon led to legal battles regarding the statute's scope and the burden of proof a reservist/employee must show to establish discriminatory action by an employer due to an employee's reserve status.

The Supreme Court addressed VRRA's burden of proof standard in Monroe v. Standard Oil Co., 452 U.S. 459, 551, 559-560 (1981). The Court held that in order for a reservist/employee to prove that an employer violated the VRRA, the reservist/employee must show the employer's discriminatory actions against the reservist/employee were "motivated solely by reserve status." The Court's holding in Monroe resulted in the enactment of USERRA, which was written, in part, to overrule Monroe' burden of proof requirement. The burden of proof under USERRA today is much easier.

USERRA, which was passed in 1994, provides many protections. Two of those protections are protection against discrimination and protection of one's pre-deployment job.

== Eligibility criteria ==
USERRA establishes the cumulative length of time that an individual may be absent from work for military duty and retain reemployment rights to five years. The exceptions to the five-year limit include initial enlistments lasting more than five years, periodic United States National Guard and reserve training duty, and involuntary active duty extensions and recalls, especially during a time of national emergency. USERRA clearly establishes that reemployment protection does not depend on the timing, frequency, duration, or nature of an individual's service as long as the basic eligibility criteria are met.

USERRA also provides protection for disabled veterans by requiring employers to make reasonable efforts to accommodate the disability. Service members convalescing from injuries received during service or training may have up to two years from the date of completion of service to return to their jobs or apply for reemployment.

The USERRA also protects a member of the armed services from employment discrimination relating to one's military service. Under USERRA an employee must show that their military service was a "substantial" or "motivating factor" in the employer's adverse employment action, like firing or demotion. Since employers rarely tell reservist/employees that they are being fired because of their military service, the USERRA allows a party to establish discrimination by, among other things, examining the proximity in time between the adverse act (like firing) and the military service event (like an employee informing an employer of the employee's military obligation), whether the employer followed its internal policies, and whether the military employee was treated differently than other non-military employees.

== Public and private employer responsibilities ==
USERRA applies to all employers in the United States. This includes Federal, State, Local, Private and even Foreign Companies operating within the United States and its territories. USERRA also applies to all United States employers operating in Foreign countries.

Returning service-members are to be reemployed in the job that they would have attained had they not been absent for military service, this is known as the "escalator principle" (See FISHGOLD v. SULLIVAN DRYDOCK & REPAIR CORP., 328 U.S. 275 (1946) ), with the same seniority, status and pay, as well as other rights and benefits determined by seniority. USERRA also mandates that reasonable efforts (such as training or retraining) be made to enable returning service members to refresh or upgrade their skills to help them qualify for reemployment. The law clearly provides for alternative reemployment positions if the service member cannot qualify for the "escalator" position. USERRA also provides that while an individual is performing military service, he or she is deemed to be on a furlough or leave of absence and is entitled to the non-seniority rights and benefits accorded other individuals on comparable types of non-military leaves of absence.

Health and pension plan coverage for service members is provided for by USERRA. Individuals performing military duty of more than 30 days may elect to continue employer sponsored health care for up to 24 months; however, they may be required to pay up to 102 percent of the full premium. For military service of less than 31 days, health care coverage is provided as if the service member had remained employed. USERRA clarifies pension plan coverage by making explicit that all pension plans are protected.

== Employee responsibilities ==
The period an individual has to make application for reemployment or report back to work after military service is based on time spent on military duty. For service of less than 31 days, the service member must return at the beginning of the next regularly scheduled work period on the first full day after release from service, taking into account safe travel home plus an eight-hour rest period. For service of more than 30 days but less than 181 days, the service member must submit an application for reemployment within 14 days of release from service. For service of more than 180 days, an application for reemployment must be submitted within 90 days of release from service.

USERRA also requires that service members provide advance written or verbal notice to their employers for all military duty unless giving notice is impossible, unreasonable, or precluded by military necessity. An employee should provide notice as far in advance as is reasonable under the circumstances. Additionally, service members are able to use accrued vacation, sick, or annual leave while performing military duty. Another Federal law (5 U.S.C. 6323) gives federal civilian employees the right to 120 hours (15 days) per fiscal year of paid military leave.

== Complaint resolution process ==
The U.S. Department of Labor, through the Office of the Assistant Secretary for Veterans' Employment and Training (VETS) provides assistance to all persons having claims under USERRA, including Federal and Postal Service employees. If resolution is unsuccessful following an investigation, the service member may have their claim referred to the Department of Justice for consideration of representation in the appropriate District Court, at no cost to the claimant. Federal and Postal Service employees may have their claims referred to the Office of Special Counsel for consideration of representation before the Merit Systems Protection Board (MSPB). If violations under USERRA are shown to be willful, the court may award liquidated damages. Individuals who pursue their own claims in court or before the MSPB may be awarded reasonable attorney and expert witness fees if they prevail. Because USERRA is a relatively recent statute, not much case law interpreting it or its corresponding regulations has been developed.

On January 1, 2008, a five-year pilot project ended that had given the Office of Special Counsel shared responsibility with The Department of Labor for assisting federal employee USERRA claimants in initial claims. All claims must now be filed directly with the Department of Labor

== Sources ==
This article contains information that originally came from a US Government website, in the public domain.
