= Gladys Guggenheim Straus =

American nutritionist (1895–1980)

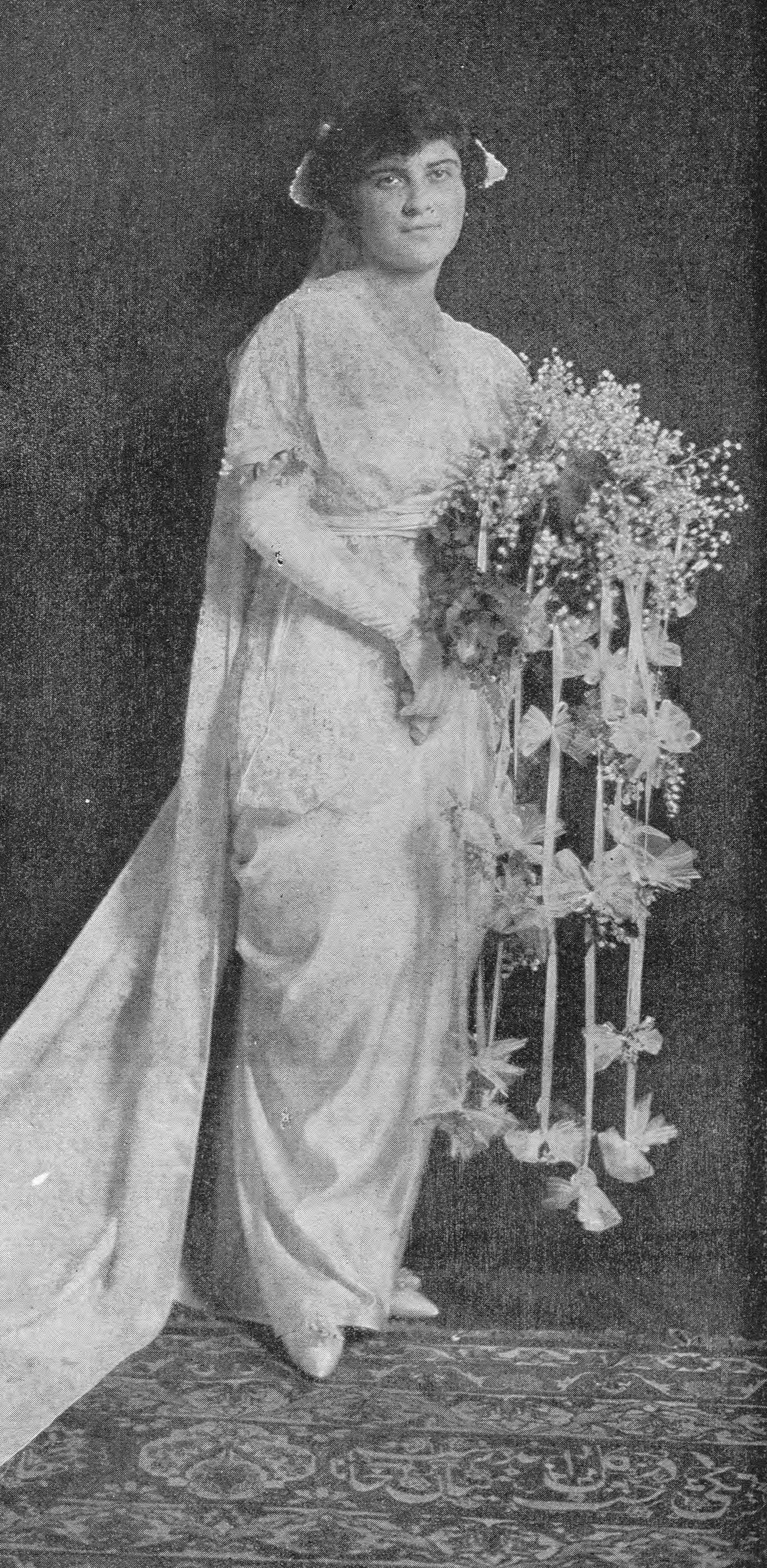
- Portrait by Campbell Studios, 1914
- Born: Gladys Eleanor Guggenheim; August 15, 1895; Elberon, New Jersey, U.S.
- Died: March 14, 1980 (aged 84); Manhattan, New York, U.S.
- Education: Rosemary Hall
- Political party: Republican
- Spouse: Roger Williams Straus (m. 1914; died 1957)
- Children: 3, including Roger Jr.
- Parent(s): Daniel Guggenheim; Florence Shloss Guggenheim
- Family: Guggenheim family Straus family Oscar Straus (father-in-law)

Gladys Eleanor Guggenheim Straus (August 15, 1895 – March 14, 1980) was an American heiress who became an expert on food and nutrition.

== Early life ==
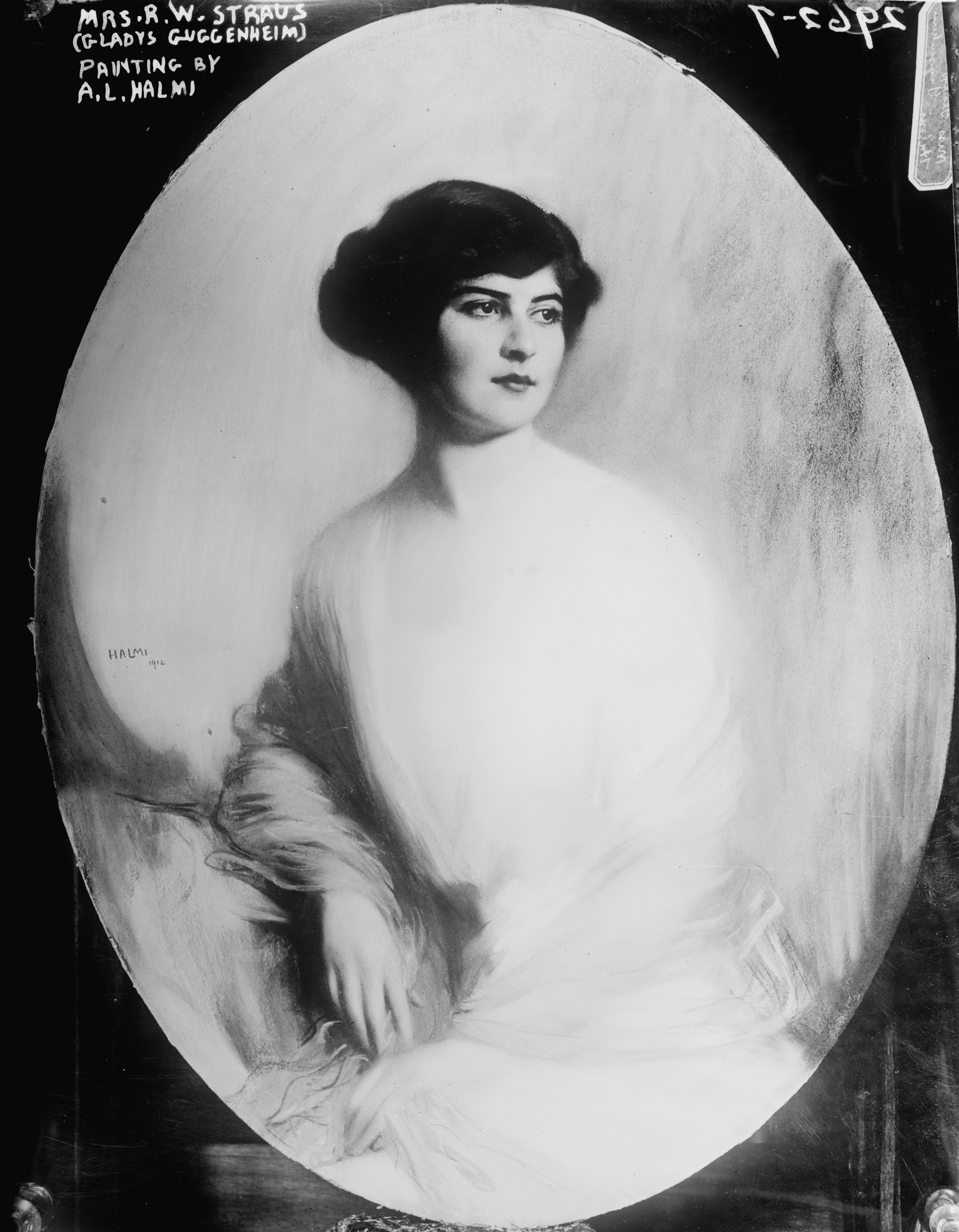
Painting by Artúr Lajos Halmi c. 1910s

She was born in Elberon, New Jersey, on August 15, 1895, as Gladys Eleanor Guggenheim. She was a daughter of Florence (née Shloss) Guggenheim (1863–1944) and Daniel Guggenheim. She had two brothers, who were both U.S. Ambassadors, Meyer Robert Guggenheim (to Portugal) and Harry Frank Guggenheim (to Cuba). Her father assumed control of the Guggenheim family enterprises after her grandfather's death in 1905. Her mother was a co-founder, and president, of the Guggenheim Foundation as well as the treasurer of the Women's National Republican Club from its inception in 1921 to 1938.

Her paternal grandparents were Barbara (née Myers) Guggenheim and Meyer Guggenheim, the Swiss-born patriarch of the Guggenheim family. At the time of Gladys' death in 1980, she was the second last surviving grandchild of Meyer Guggenheim. The last was the Eleanor May, Dowager Countess of Castle Stewart, the widow of Arthur Stuart, 7th Earl Castle Stewart. Her maternal grandparents were Lazarus Shloss and Barbara (née Kahnweiler) Shloss of Philadelphia.

In her youth, her parents lived in Manhattan and bought the former Howard Gould estate in Port Washington on the Gold Coast of Long Island. She was educated at the Rosemary Hall in Greenwich, Connecticut, from 1910 to 1913 and planned to attend Bryn Mawr College but married Straus instead.

== Career ==
In 1940, Gladys was a co-founder of Gourmet magazine, of which she was assistant editor from inception to 1950. Governor Thomas E. Dewey appointed her a Nutrition Commissioner for the New York Metropolitan area from 1943 to 1945 and again from 1947 to 1948. She was also a trustee Mount Sinai Hospital for more than fifty years and served as vice president of the board from 1951 to 1971.

She was a trustee of the Institute on Man and Science in Rensselaerville, New York, Chairman of the Mount Sinai Medical School and a trustee of the Roger Williams Straus Memorial Foundation. She served as chairman of her parents' foundation, the Daniel and Florence Guggenheim Foundation and was a member of the council New York State College Home Economics from 1943 to 1946.

In politics, Straus was a Republican and served as vice president of the Board of Governors of the Women's National Republican Club from 1936 to 1951.

== Personal life ==
Coverage of Guggenheim's marriage to Roger W. Straus in The New York Times, January 11, 1914

On January 12, 1914, Gladys was married to Roger Williams Straus Sr. (1891–1957). Straus served as president of the American Smelting and Refining Company and was the only son of Oscar Straus (the former Secretary of Commerce and Labor and Ambassador to the Ottoman Empire) and Sarah Lavanburg Straus. Roger's uncle and aunt, Isidor Straus and Ida Straus, and Gladys' uncle, Benjamin Guggenheim, perished aboard the RMS Titanic in April 1912. Together, Gladys and Roger lived at 6 East 93rd Street in Manhattan and their country home in Purchase, New York, and were the parents of two sons and one daughter:

- Oscar Solomon Straus II (1914–2013), who married Marion Miller (b. 1913). They divorced and he married Joan Treble Sutton.
- Roger Williams Straus Jr. (1917–2004), a co-founder and chairman of book publishing company Farrar, Straus and Giroux who married Dorothea Liebmann (granddaughter of Charles Liebmann).
- Florence Guggenheim Straus (born 1922), who married Max A. Hart (1919–1999), of the Hart Schaffner Marx clothing family, in 1947.

Her husband suffered a heart attack while fishing near his lodge at Grahamsville and died at Liberty, New York, on July 28, 1957. Gladys died on March 14, 1980, in her Manhattan apartment.
