= Lazarus Straus =

German-American entrepreneur

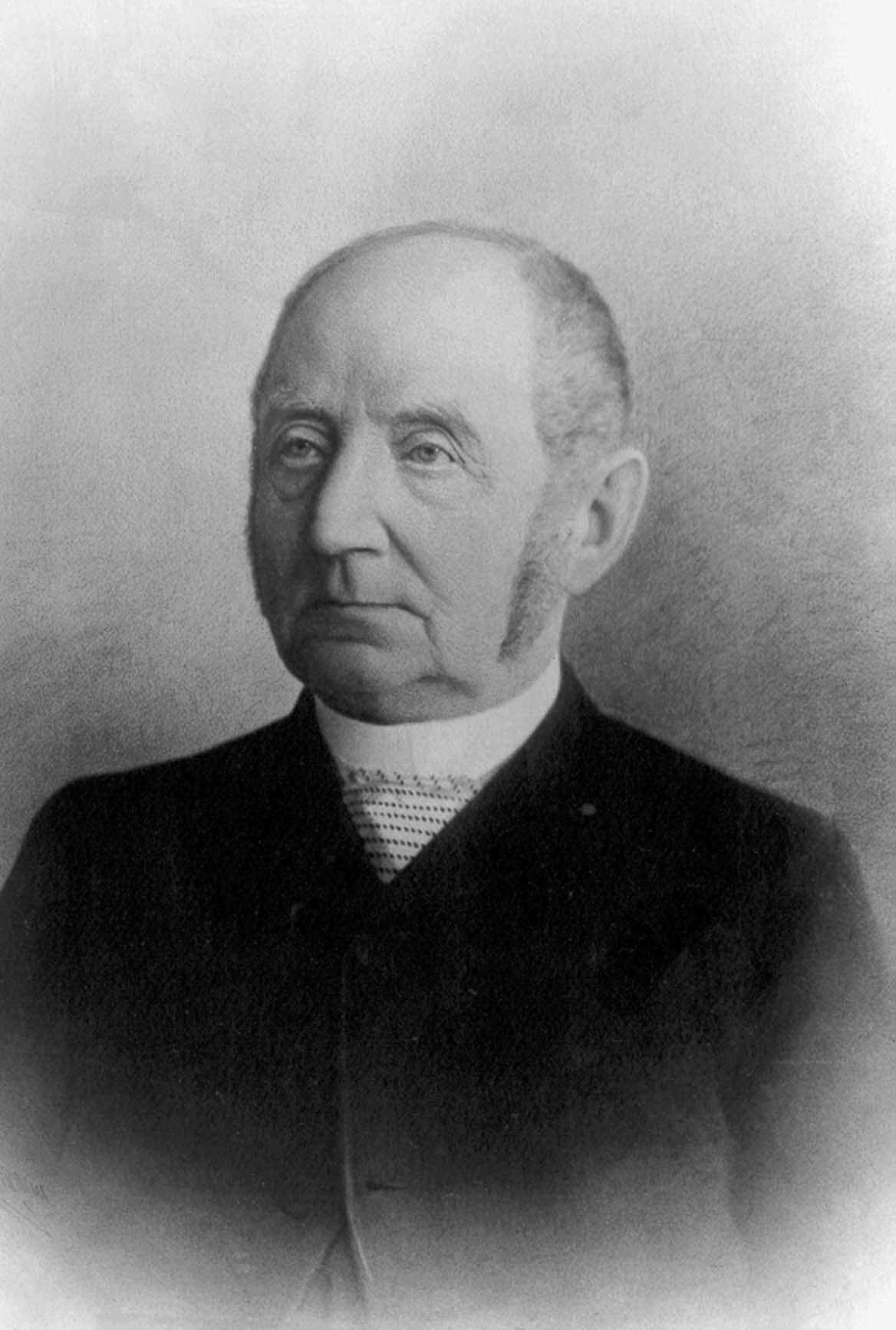
- Born: April 25, 1809; Otterberg, Palatinate, Kingdom of Bavaria (now Germany)
- Died: January 14, 1898 (aged 88); New York City, U.S.
- Occupations: Trader, entrepreneur
- Known for: Founder of L. Straus & Sons, owner of Macy's
- Spouse(s): Davora Levi (m. 1838; died 1843) Sara Levi (m. 1844)
- Children: Karoline; Isidor; Hermine; Nathan; Jakob; Oscar

Lazarus Straus (April 25, 1809 – January 14, 1898) was a German-American trader and entrepreneur. He founded L. Straus & Sons and, after the death of Rowland Hussey Macy, became the owner of Macy's department store.

== Life and work ==
=== In the Bavarian Palatinate ===
Lazarus Straus was born on April 25, 1809, in Otterberg. He owned land in Schallodenbach and Mehlbach in what is now Rhineland-Palatinate (then under the French flag) and was a grain trader. He did not take an active part in the revolution of 1848, but was liberal and sympathized with it. Straus felt threatened by discrimination, suspicion and an impending court case in Zweibrücken, in which he was supposed to answer for his financial support of the revolution. Since his hope for full citizenship for people of Jewish faith was not fulfilled due to the suppression of the revolution, he emigrated to the United States, where he arrived in Philadelphia in 1852, which at that time was the center for German Jews in the United States.

=== In Georgia ===
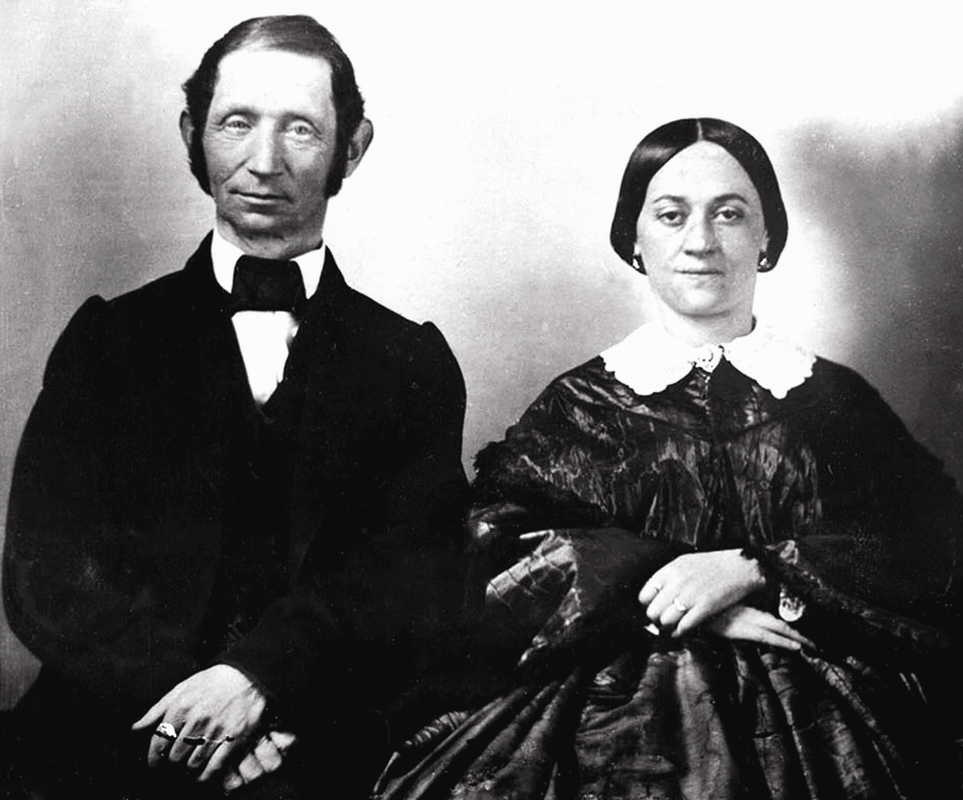
Lazarus and Sara Straus, c. 1860

Straus followed a recommendation that he would find better opportunities in the south and headed to the state of Georgia, where he initially worked as a peddler in Oglethorpe. He used a wheelbarrow to deliver goods to plantation owners and their families and also delivered messages. Straus soon used the profits from the sale of his property in Germany to open a general store in the small town of Talbotton, and in 1854 he had his wife and sons join him. Daughter Karoline from his first marriage stayed in Germany. The Straus family was the only Jewish family in town.

Although he owned slaves himself, Lazarus Straus was an opponent of slavery in the United States. When the Southern states united in the Confederacy seceded from the Northern states (Union States) that remained in the Union, he refused to vote for secession. During the American Civil War, supplies became scarce and prices rose. A grand jury in Talbotton found that the high prices were the fault of the Jewish traders and condemned them for their "vicious and unpatriotic conduct."

Although he was never expelled from the town, Straus was so unpopular with the anti-Semitic residents of the town whose tempers were so heated due to the war, that he fled Talbotton with his family in 1863 and went to Columbus. Straus did not want to continue living in a community that had cast such a shadow over his character. Some of Talbotton's citizens had tried to persuade Straus to stay. He left the control of the family house to his son Nathan, who ultimately exchanged the house for a horse.

In Columbus, his company, Georgia Importing and Exporting Company, traded in everyday goods from Europe, bypassing the blockade of the northern states. At the end of the Civil War, the cavalry under General James Harrison Wilson stormed and pillaged the town. Straus then predicted that the South would take several decades to recover, which is why he left Georgia in 1865 and moved to New York City. He disposed of the remainder of his cotton stock, which was his most important asset, and paid off debts in New York and Philadelphia. With the $25,000 that was left to him and his good credit rating, he wanted to make a new start here.

=== In New York ===
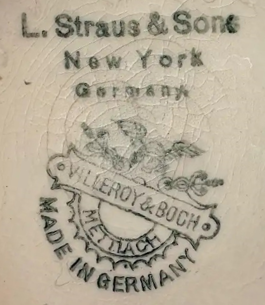
L. Straus & Sons mark alongside the Villeroy & Boch logo, 1908

Together with his son Isidor, Lazarus Straus founded a glassware and tableware business at 165 Chambers Street With the entry of his other two sons into the company, it operated as L. Straus & Sons. Expensive foreign porcelain, clocks, vases and bronzes were soon added to the range of consumer goods. In 1873, the Straus family opened their own department in the basement of Rowland H. Macy 's department store on 14th Street. In 1882 he founded the New York and Rudolstadt Pottery Co. Inc, which produced high-quality porcelain ware in Rudolstadt and imported it to America. After Macy's death in 1877, Straus first acquired shares in Macy's store in 1884, then the entire department store in 1895/1896, which the family developed into the largest department store in the United States. In 1895, Straus' company operated two other European factories in addition to Rudolfstadt in Karlovy Vary and Limoges.

Macy's was just one of the Straus family's many forays into retail and department stores. In 1876, the year of Philadelphia's Centennial Exhibition, they opened a wholesale showroom and a retail store there. Following the exhibition, Straus entered into a contract with John Wanamaker to house the company's inventory in Wanamaker's department store in Philadelphia. In the 1880s and 1890s, L. Straus & Sons maintained sizeable departments in major department stores such as Boston (RH White Co. and Jordan March & Co.), Chicago (JH Walker & Co. and Mandel Bros.), Baltimore (Joel Gutman & Co.), Philadelphia (Strawbridge & Clothier, after a contract dispute with Wanamaker), Washington, DC (Woodward & Lothrop) and Brooklyn (Wechsel & Abraham, later Abraham & Straus). In addition, Straus maintained branches in London, Paris, Bohemia and elsewhere.

The philanthropist Lazarus Straus supported, among other things, scientific projects and educational institutions, such as Meyer Kayserling's research project on the history of the Sephardic Jews on the Iberian Peninsula. He was a member of the Beth Elohim Congregation and was considered to have deep roots in New York's Jewish community; Henry Hall called him "a prominent Hebrew" in his book America's Successful Men of Affairs: The city of New York; the House of Bavarian History described him as the "Patriarch of German Jewry in New York". He contributed donations to the maintenance of the Mount Sinai Hospital and the Montefiore Home for Chronic Disease. Three of his sons "achieved considerable reputation in society in important positions".

Lazarus Straus died on January 14, 1898, at the age of 88 at his residence at 23 West 56th Street in Manhattan, New York City. The cause of death was determined to be aortic valve insufficiency, liver cirrhosis, shrunken kidney and heart failure. He was involved in the company's business until the last weeks of his life.

His written legacy is stored in the New York Public Library.

== Reception ==
Leon Harris wrote in his 1979 book Merchant Princes : "The only Jewish merchant family in America comparable to the Rothschilds of Europe is the Straus family. It is the only family, other than the Rosenwalds, to have amassed a great fortune and created a lifestyle as remarkable in luxury, lavishness and service as that of the Rothschilds."

In his book on Jewish Boston History Sites, Michael A. Ross called the Straus family a "titan among American department store operators."

== Family ==
Lazarus Straus was the eldest of fourteen children of Isaac Straus, who in 1806 commissioned Napoleon Bonaparte to develop a concept for the emancipation of Jews in Bavaria on the left bank of the Rhine, and his wife Johanette. Isaac Straus took the surname Straus in 1808 following a Napoleonic decree.

His first marriage to his cousin, Davora Fanni Levi (died 1843), resulted in the birth of his daughter in 1838. After the death of his first wife, he married her sister Sara Levi (1823–1876) in 1844, with whom he had four sons and a daughter; including the entrepreneur and U.S. Congressman (serving in the United States House of Representatives) Isidor Straus (1845–1912), who died with his wife Ida Straus in the sinking of the Titanic, entrepreneur Nathan Straus (1848–1931), and U.S. representative to the Ottoman Empire Oscar Solomon Straus (1850–1926). His first daughter was Karoline Straus (1838–1880), his second was Hermine Straus (1846–1922), and his fourth son was Jakob Otto Straus (1849–1851), who died as a baby at one and a half years old.

Straus Family
- Lazarus Straus (1725-1776)
  - Jacob Lazarus Straus (1754-1834) m. Karoline Sara Meyerovitz (1760-1831)
    - Isaac Straus (1788-1839) m. Johanette Grunebaum (1791-1870)
      - Lazarus Straus (1809–1898) m. (1) Davora Fanni Levi (1815-1843), [2] Sara Levi (1823-1876)
        - Karoline Straus (1838–1888) m. Moritz Weiss
          - Ferdinand Weiss (1862–1917) m. Amalie Künstler
        - Isidor Straus (1845–1912) m. Rosalie Ida Blün (1849-1912)
          - Jesse Isidor Straus (1872–1936) m. Irma Nathan
            - Beatrice Nathan Straus (1897–1967) m. Robert L. Levy
            - Jack Isidor Straus (1900–1985) m. (1) Margaret Hollister, m. [2] Virginia Meager
            - Robert Kenneth Straus (1905–1997) m. Barbara Flower
              - Penelope Ann Straus m. (1) Dana Safford More, [2] Slim Chandra-Shekar
                - Braden More m. Shadan Golkar
                  - DAUGHTER
                - Alexandra More
              - Christopher Jesse Straus
          - Clarence Elias Straus (1874–1876)
          - Percy Selden Straus (1876–1944) m. Edith Abraham
            - Ralph Isidor Straus (1903–1996) m. Matilda Day
            - Percy Selden Straus Jr. (1906–1976) m. Marjorie Jester
            - Donald Blun Straus (1916–2007) m. Elizabeth Allen
          - Sara Straus (1878–1960) m. Alfred Fabian Hess (1875-1933)
            - Eleanor Straus Hess (1906–1975) m. Harold Philip Kurzman
            - Margaret Straus Hess (1907–1998) m. Jan de Graaff (1903-1989)
              - Alfred de Graaff
              - Joan de Graaff
            - Alfred Straus Hess (1909–1917)
          - Minnie Straus (1880–1940) m. Richard Weil (1876-1917)
            - Evelyn Straus Weil (1906–1972) m. (1) Ernald Wilbraham Alfred Richardson, [2] Sebastian Bernard de Mier, {3} Antonio Martin Arostegui, <4> George Backer Jr. (1902-1974)
            - Richard Isidor Straus Weil Jr. (1907–1958) m. Allene Hall
            - Frederick Peter Weil (1916–1980) m. Susan Cooper
          - Herbert Nathan Straus (1881–1933) m. Therese Kuhn
            - Edward Kuhn Straus (1909–1996) m. (1) Catharine Monroe, [2] Kate Fraser
            - Oliver Herbert Straus (1914–1971) m. (1) June Hookey, [2] Sally Goodrich Strong
              - Oliver Harry Straus Jr. (born 1962) m. Agnes Patricia Mullaney (born 1963)
                - Mikaela Mullaney Straus (born 1998)
            - John Wendell Straus (1920–2008) m. (1) Violette Veigl, [2] Ann Helburn
          - Vivian Straus (1886–1967) m. (1) Herbert Adolph Scheftel, [2] George A. Dixon Jr.
            - Herbert Adolph Scheftel Jr. (1907–2000) m. (1) Agnes Mary O'Leary, [2] Yolande Françoise Bemova
            - Stuart Scheftel (1910–1994), m. Geraldine Mary Wilma Fitzgerald (1913-2005)
            - Vivian Dixon (1918–1974) m (1) T. Dennie Boardman, [2] Rodman Wanamaker Jr.
        - Hermine Straus (1846–1922) m. Lazarus Kohns
          - Lee Kohns (1864–1927) m. Clare E. Elfelt
          - Irene Kohns (1871–1961) m. Edmond E. Wise
        - Nathan Straus (1848–1931) m. Lina Gutherz
          - Jerome Nathan Straus (1876–1893)
          - Sara Gutherz Straus (1877–1878)
          - Sara Sissie Straus (1879–1950) m. Irving Lehman (1876-1945)
          - Roland Straus (1881–1884)
          - Nathan Straus Jr. (1889–1961) m. Helen Sachs
            - Nathan Straus III (1916–2014) m. Rebecca Smith
            - Barnard Sachs Straus (1919–2009) m. Joan Paley (1932-2004)
            - Irving Lehman Straus (1921–2012), m. Barbara Vaughan
            - Ronald Peter Straus (1923–2012) m. (1) Ellen Louise Sulzberger (1925-1995), [2] Marcia Lewis
          - Hugh Grant Straus (1890–1961) m. Flora Stieglitz
            - Hugh Grant Straus Jr. (1915–1990) m. Helen Cohen
            - Jerome Nathan Straus (1917–1936)
            - Anne Elizabeth Straus (1922–2017) m. Emmanuel Maynard Gertler
            - Virginia Babette Straus (1926–2003) m. Richard Bersohn (1925-2003)
        - Jakob Otto Straus (1849–1851)
        - Oscar Solomon Straus (1850–1926) m. Sarah Lavanburg (1861-1945)
          - Mildred Caroline Straus (1882–1947) m. Edward Schafer
            - John Simon Schafer (1902–1903)
            - Edward Schafer Jr. (1902–1952) m. Dorothy Stuart
            - Madeleine Schafer (1906–1972) m. Paul M. Herzog (1906-1986)
              - John Herzog
              - Andrea Herzog
            - Oscar Straus Schafer (1908–1961) m. (1) Marjorie Grier, [2] Adelae Hansen
              - Oscar Straus Schafer Jr. (born 1939) m. Didi
            - Roger Straus Schafer (1919–1991) m. Hebe Bixby
          - Aline Straus (1883–1961) m. Leonard Albert Hockstader
            - Albert Frank Hockstader (1906–1978) m. Katherine Hecht
            - Carol Emily Hockstader (1909–1978) m. Ralph MacKenzie Kellogg
            - Mildred Edna Hockstader (1911–2005) m. David Moscovitz
          - Roger Williams Straus Sr. (1891–1957) m. Gladys Guggenheim
            - Oscar Solomon Straus II (1914–2013) m. (1) Marion Miller, [2] Joan Sutton
            - Roger Williams Straus Jr. (1917–2004) m. Dorothea Liebmann
              - Roger Williams Straus III
            - Florence Guggenheim Straus (born 1922) m. Max A. Hart
