= Oscar Straus =

Oscar Straus may refer to:

- Oscar Straus (composer) (1870–1954), Viennese composer of operettas
- Oscar Straus (politician) (1850–1926), United States Secretary of Commerce and Labor from 1906 to 1909
