= Jack I. Straus =

American executive (born 1900)

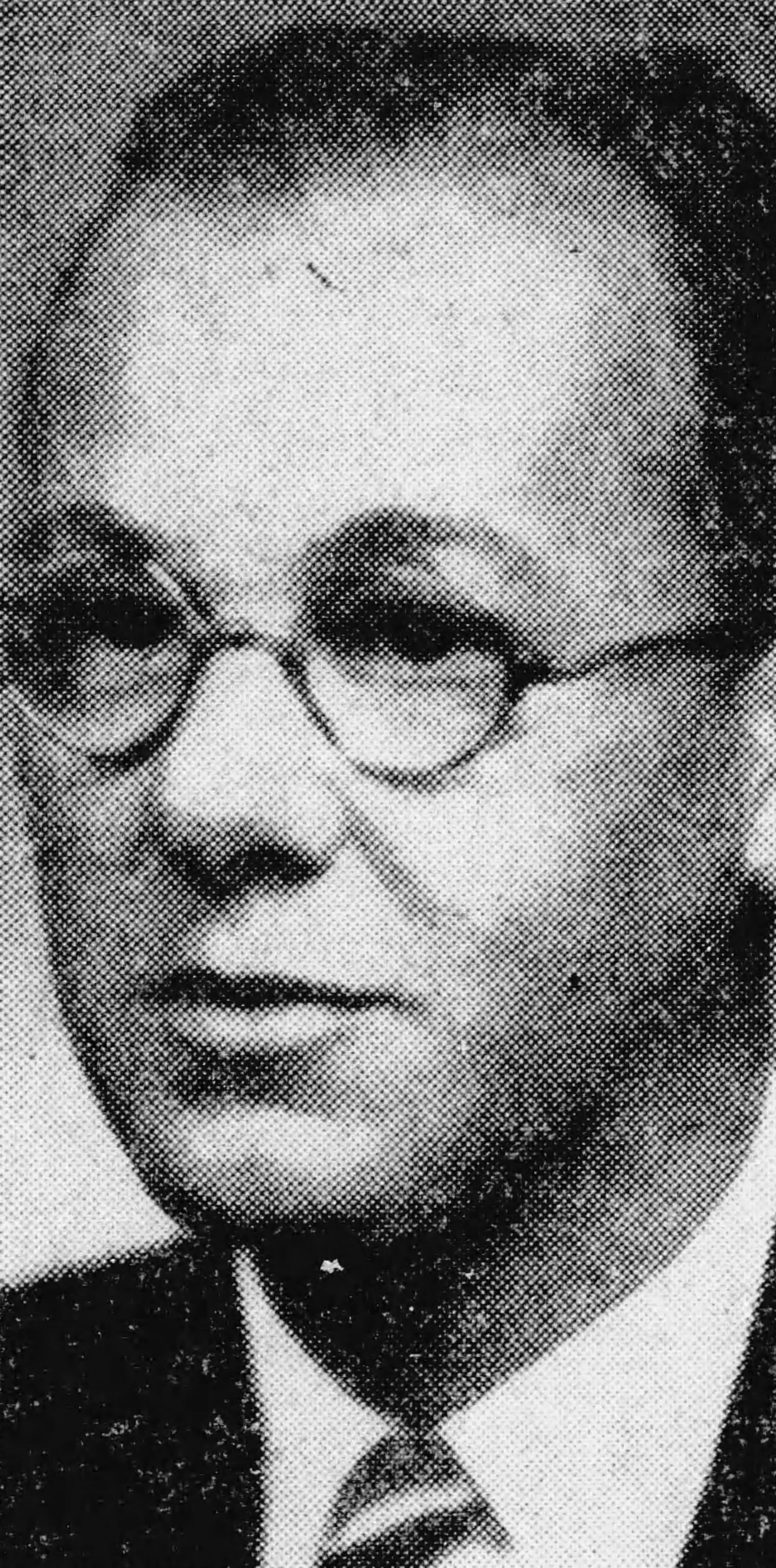
- Straus c. 1947
- Born: June 23, 1900
- Died: September 19, 1985 (aged 85)
- Education: Harvard University
- Father: Jesse I. Straus
- Relatives: Straus family

Jack Isidor Straus (June 23, 1900 – September 19, 1985) was an American executive who served as a chair of Macy's.

== Biography ==
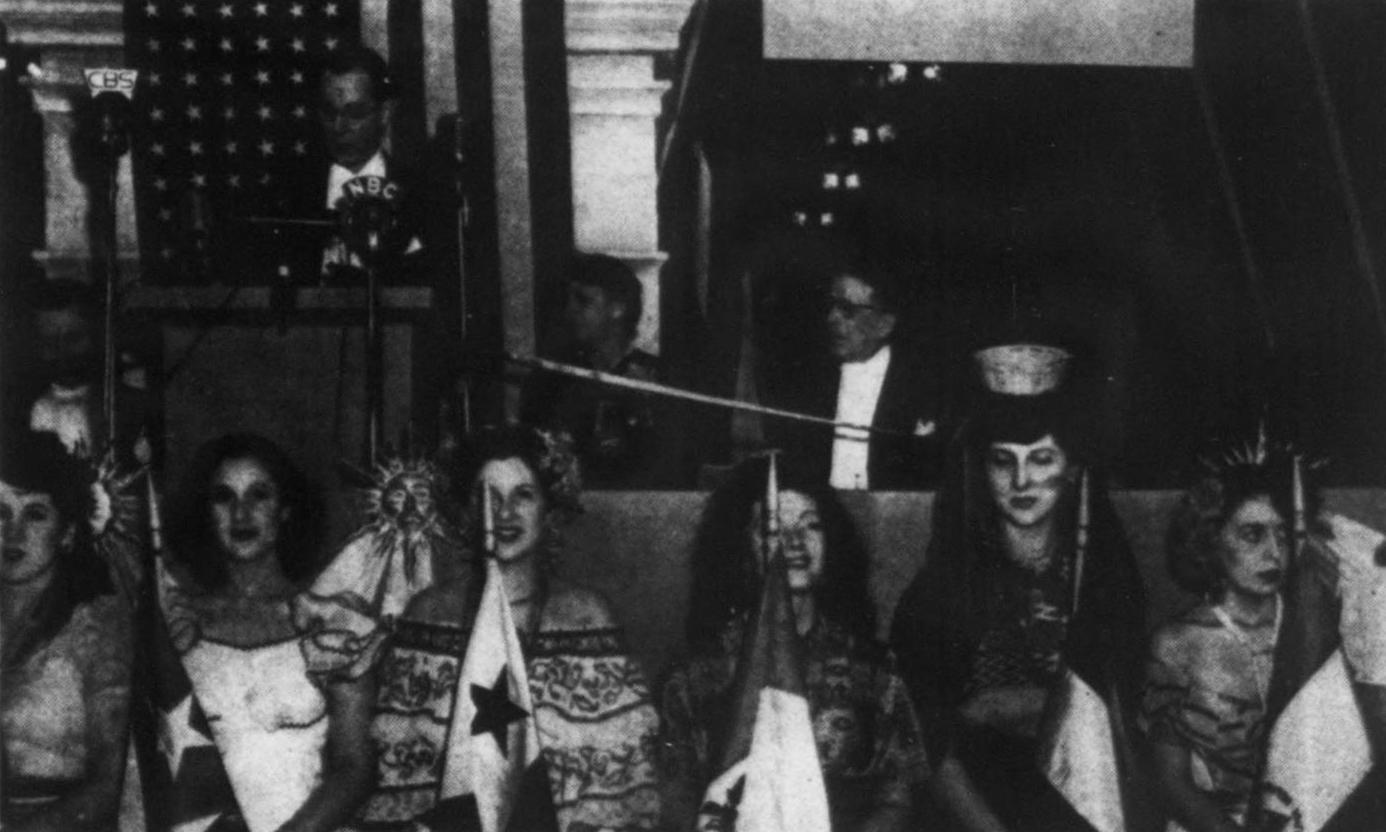
Straus speaks at the opening of the Macy's Latin American Fair, flanked by Nelson Rockefeller and Eleanor Roosevelt, 1942

Straus was born into the Straus family, with his great-grandfather, Lazarus Straus, relocating from Georgia to New York after the American Civil War to establish L. Straus & Sons.

Straus graduated from Harvard University in 1921 and joined Macy's the same year. He became vice president in 1933, and rose to president and CEO in 1940. He held the position of chairman beginning in 1956 and served as chairman of the executive committee from 1968 until his retirement in 1976, later remaining as honorary chairman and director emeritus until his 1985.

Straus served on the Harvard University board of overseers from 1950 to 1954 and was involved with the Harvard School of Business Administration's visiting committee. In 1973, he and his brother Robert K. Straus endowed a chair at the Harvard Business School in memory of their father.

Straus received honorary doctorates from New York University and Adelphi College and was decorated by the governments of France, Italy, and Belgium.
