= Sarah Lavanburg Straus =

Wife of Oscar Straus

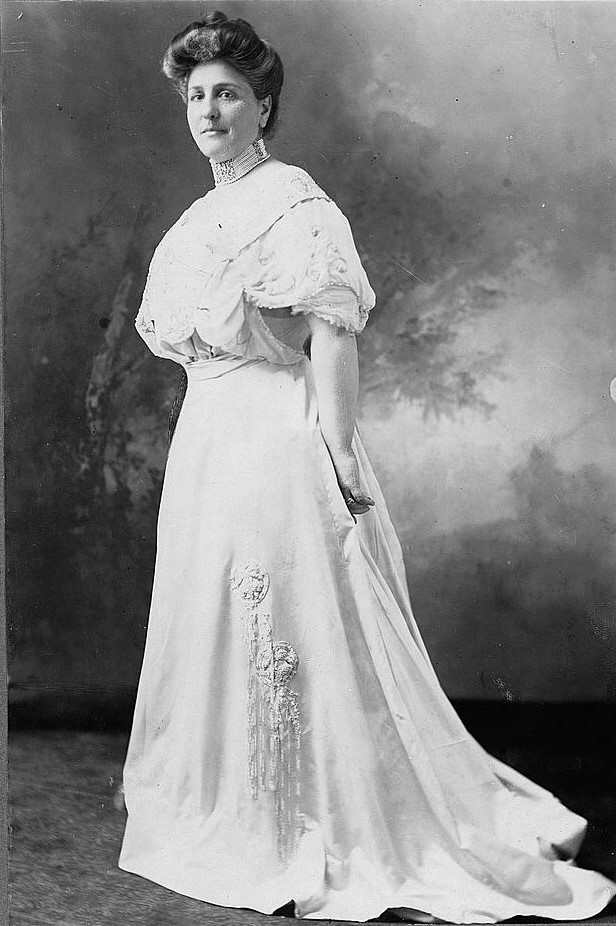
- Born: Sarah Lavanburg; 1861; New York City, U.S.
- Died: November 9, 1945 (aged 84); New York City, U.S.
- Occupation: Philanthropist
- Spouse: Oscar Straus (m. 1882; died 1926)
- Children: 3
- Family: Straus family

Sarah Lavanburg Straus (née Lavanburg; 1861 – November 9, 1945) was an American philanthropist and wife of diplomat Oscar Straus.

== Biography ==
Born Sarah Lavanburg to a Jewish family in 1861 in New York City, the daughter of Hannah (née Seller) and Louis Lavanburg. Her father was an investment banker. She had one brother, merchant Frederick Lavanburg. She was educated in private schools. On April 19, 1882, she married Bavarian-immigrant and American diplomat Oscar Straus. From 1887 to 1889, she lived in Istanbul where her husband served as ambassador and she became acquainted with German-Jewish industrialist Baron Maurice de Hirsch and Baroness Clara de Hirsch. In 1891, the Strausses persuaded Baron Hirsch to establish the Baron de Hirsch Fund which focused on aiding Jewish immigrants relocating from Russia; and the Clara de Hirsch Home for Working Girls. Straus was appointed the first president of the Clara De Hirsch Home for Working Girls where she served until her death. In 1915, the Immigrant Home's operation was taken over by Straus and her brother, and renamed the Hannah Lavanburg Home in honor of their mother.

In 1926, her husband died. In 1929, she financed and participated in a four-month expedition to central Africa for the American Museum of Natural History to obtain birds from Uganda, Kenya, and Nyasaland (now Malawi). In 1934, she financed and participated in an eight-month expedition to West Africa for the Field Museum of Natural History to collect bird specimens in Senegal, French Sudan, and Niger territory. Straus served on the board of the Fred L. Lavanburg Foundation.

== Personal life ==
Straus had three children with her husband: Mildred Straus Schafer (born 1883), Aline Straus Hockstader (born 1889), and Roger Williams Straus (1891–1957, married to Gladys Eleanor Guggenheim). Strauss died on November 9, 1945, at her home in New York City. She was a member of Temple Emanu-El in Manhattan. Her grandson is Roger Williams Straus Jr.
