= Roger Williams Straus Jr. =

American publisher (1917–2004)

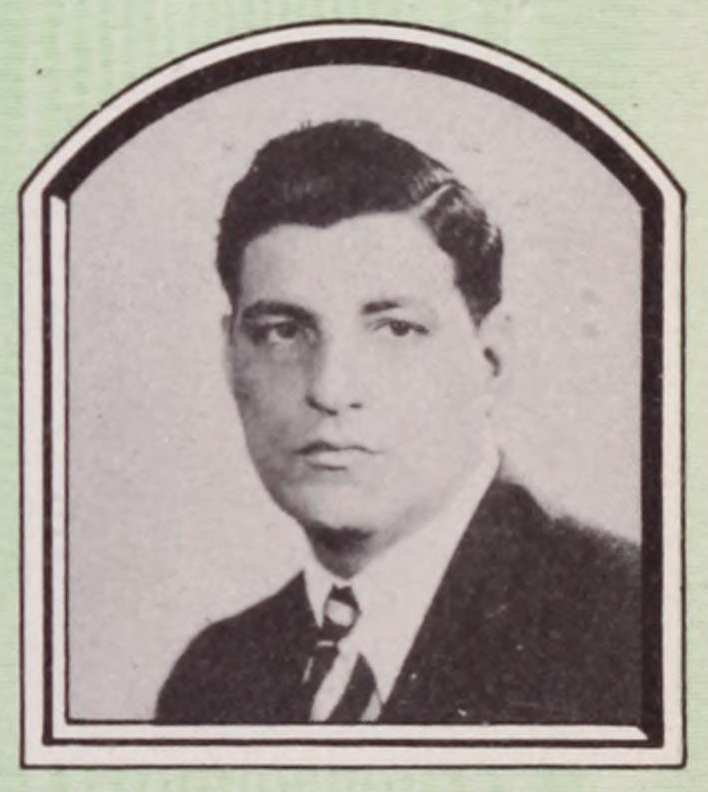
- Straus c. 1952
- Born: January 3, 1917; New York City
- Died: May 25, 2004 (aged 87); New York City
- Education: University of Missouri (1939)
- Spouse: Dorothea Liebmann
- Children: Roger Straus III
- Parent(s): Roger Williams Straus Sr. Gladys Guggenheim
- Relatives: Straus family

Roger Williams Straus Jr. (January 3, 1917 – May 25, 2004) was an American publisher who was co-founder and chairman of Farrar, Straus and Giroux, a New York book publishing company, and member of the Guggenheim family.

== Biography ==
=== Early life ===
Coverage of Straus's parents' marriage in The New York Times, January 11, 1914

Straus was born in New York City and was raised in a wealthy and influential Jewish family. His mother was Gladys Guggenheim Straus (1895–1980), heir to one of the largest fortunes in America. His father, Roger Williams Straus Sr. (1891–1957), grew up in the family that owned Macy's and was chairman of the American Smelting and Refining Co., which was owned by his wife's family. Straus' paternal grandfather, Oscar Straus, served as Secretary of Commerce and Labor under President Theodore Roosevelt and was the first Jewish member of a U.S. Cabinet; his paternal grandmother was philanthropist Sarah Lavanburg Straus. Two of his great-uncles perished on the Titanic, Isidor Straus and Benjamin Guggenheim.

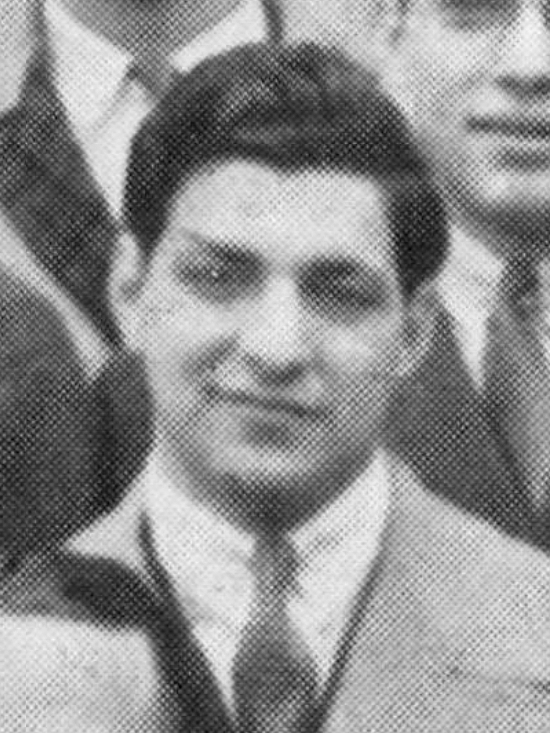
Straus in the University of Missouri yearbook, 1939

While Straus Sr. focused on metal, Straus Jr. had his mind on paper. A summer job as copyboy and occasional writer for the White Plains Daily Reporter got him interested in journalism. He dropped out of St. George's School, but was accepted to Hamilton College in 1935. In 1937 he transferred to the University of Missouri and earned a bachelor's degree in journalism in 1939 (He would gain honorary Doctor of Literature degrees from U.M. in 1976 and Hofstra University 1989.)

On June 27, 1938, Straus married childhood friend Dorothea Liebmann, great-granddaughter of the founder of Rheingold Brewing, Samuel Liebmann and granddaughter of its president Charles Liebmann.

Straus worked a variety of jobs after graduation. He was a reporter for the Columbia Missourian, publisher and editor of a literary magazine called Asterisk, and an editorial staff member of Current History magazine. He edited a series of history books for G. P. Putnam and also did reporting for the White Plains Daily Reporter.

With the onset of World War II, he joined the Navy but a spinal infection prevented him from seeing action. He was put to work in the Magazine and Book Section of the Navy Office of Public Relations in New York, with his friend James Van Alen. Lieutenant Straus was discharged in 1945.

=== Publisher ===
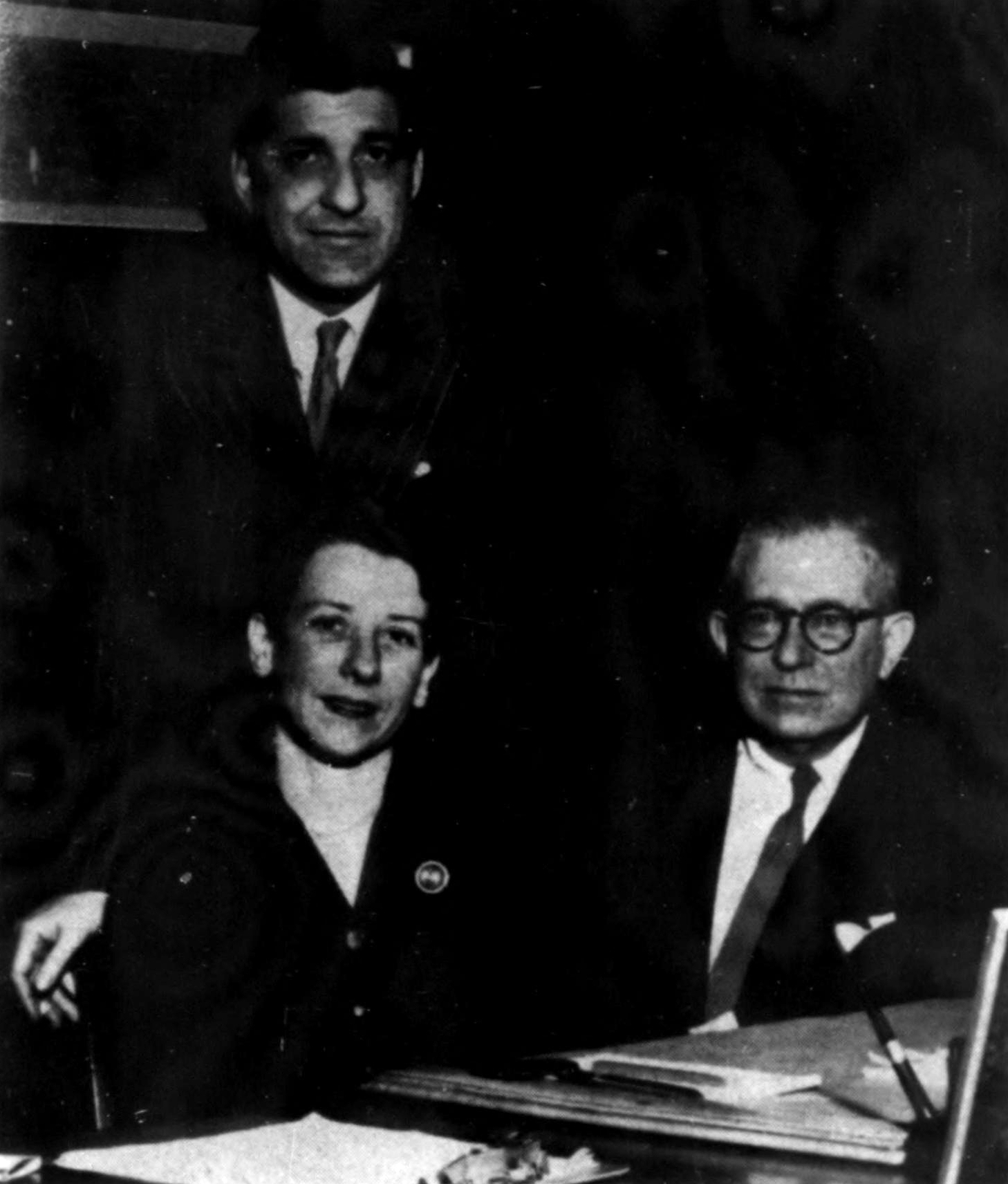
Straus (standing) with John C. Farrar (seated, right) and Sheila Cudahy, another business partner, c. December 1956

The New York Times editorial page editor Charles Merz, a friend of his father, introduced Straus to John C. Farrar of Farrar & Rinehart (1929–1946). Straus borrowed $30,000 against his inheritance, $70,000 from his Navy co-worker Van Alen, and another $50,000 from others including Julius Fleischmann, whose family was famous for yeast and gin. The two began the firm of Farrar Straus & Co. on November 21, 1945. It was located in the naval office where Straus had served. They earned $200,000 in sales in their first year. Their first blockbuster was Gayelord Hauser's Look Younger, Live Longer, which was published in 1950 and eventually sold 600,000 copies.

From 1948 to 1971, Farrar Straus acquired seven competitors including Hendricks House, Pellegrini & Cudahy, Noonday Press, and Hill & Wang. In 1950, stockholder Stanley Young was recognized when the company was renamed Farrar, Straus & Young. It was Farrar, Straus & Cudahy in 1953. In 1955, the company hired Editor-in-chief Robert Giroux away from rival Harcourt, Brace. He brought along no fewer than 15 authors including T. S. Eliot and Flannery O'Connor. The company became known as Farrar Straus & Giroux in 1964 with Giroux's appointment as chairman of the board.

Straus was regarded as one of the last old-fashioned publishers, faithful to his company and tight with his money, but emphasizing quality over commercial success. His dedication to the publishing business earned him several Nobel Prize-winning authors, including Isaac Bashevis Singer, Aleksandr Solzhenitsyn, Joseph Brodsky, Nadine Gordimer, Czesław Miłosz and T. S. Eliot, and Pulitzer Prize authors such as Robert Lowell, John McPhee, Philip Roth, and Bernard Malamud. The FSG brand became so renowned that author Scott Turow turned down a $350,000 advance from a rival publisher for his first novel, Presumed Innocent, so that he could work with Straus, who offered him $200,000.

John McPhee speaking at Straus's memorial service said of him, "He was there in my thirties, forties, fifties and sixties, and was still leading me up the street on a leash when I entered my seventies."

In 1994, twenty years after his partner Farrar had died, Straus ceded control of the company to a German publishing conglomerate, Georg von Holtzbrinck Publishing Group, the type of company he had long disdained and spoken out against. He reportedly made more than $30 million on the sale. Still, he continued to occupy a corner office at company headquarters until pneumonia put him in the hospital and ultimately caused his death in 2004.
