= Oscar Schafer =

US investment banker and philanthropist

Oscar Straus Schafer Jr. (born 1939) is an investment banker, philanthropist and chairman emeritus of the New York Philharmonic. He is the chairman of Rivulet Capital, which he established in 2012. Prior to that he operated O.S.S. Capital Management from 2001 and was a member of Cumberland Associates from 1982 to 2001 and partner at Steinhardt, Fine, Berkowitz & Company from 1970 to 1982.

Schafer received his bachelor's and master's degrees from Harvard in 1961 and 1964, respectively. Schafer joined the Phil's board of directors in 2007 and was named chairman in December 2014 after serving as chair of a board committee. Together with his wife Didi, Schafer gave the largest individual gift in the philharmonic's history, twenty five million dollars in 2015, under which they also sponsor the orchestra's annual summer parks' concert series.

Schafer's grandfather was Oscar Straus, Theodore Roosevelt's Secretary of Commerce and Labor.

He served as a chairman of the New York Philharmonic from 2014 to at least 2015, as well as many additional years on the board itself.
