= Oscar Straus (politician) =

American politician and diplomat (1850–1926)

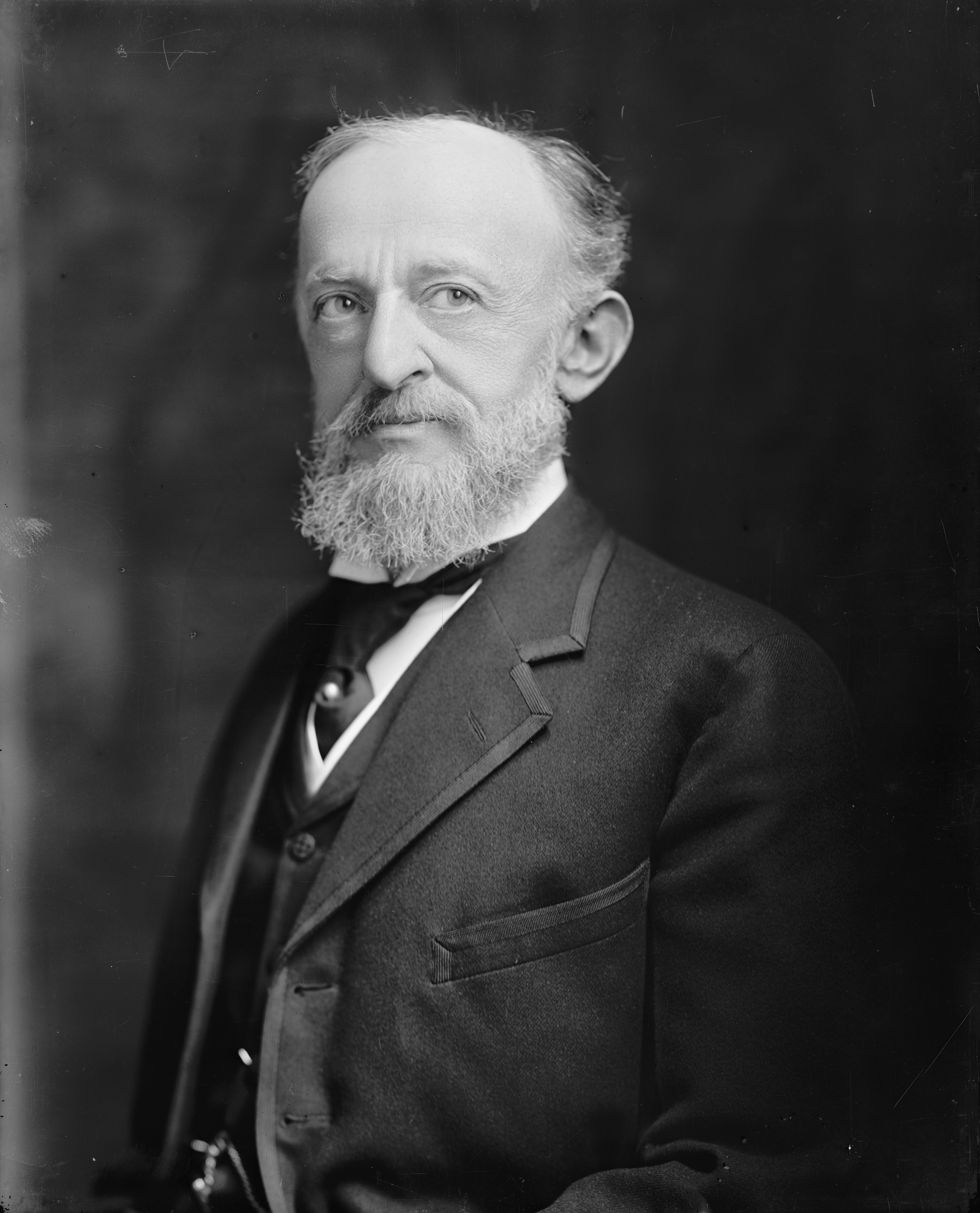
- Portrait by Harris & Ewing c. 1910s

3rd United States Secretary of Commerce and Labor
- In office December 17, 1906 – March 5, 1909
- President: Theodore Roosevelt
- Preceded by: Victor H. Metcalf
- Succeeded by: Charles Nagel

United States Ambassador to the Ottoman Empire
- In office October 4, 1909 – September 3, 1910
- President: William Howard Taft
- Preceded by: John Leishman
- Succeeded by: William Rockhill
- In office October 15, 1898 – December 20, 1899; Minister
- President: William McKinley
- Preceded by: James Angell
- Succeeded by: John Leishman
- In office July 1, 1887 – June 16, 1889; Envoy
- President: Grover Cleveland; Benjamin Harrison
- Preceded by: Samuel S. Cox
- Succeeded by: Solomon Hirsch

Personal details
- Born: Oscar Solomon Straus; December 23, 1850 Otterberg, Bavaria, Germany
- Died: May 3, 1926 (aged 75) New York City, U.S.
- Party: Republican
- Other political affiliations: Progressive "Bull Moose" (1912)
- Spouse: Sarah Lavanburg (m. 1882)
- Children: 3
- Relatives: Straus family
- Education: Columbia University (BA, LLB)
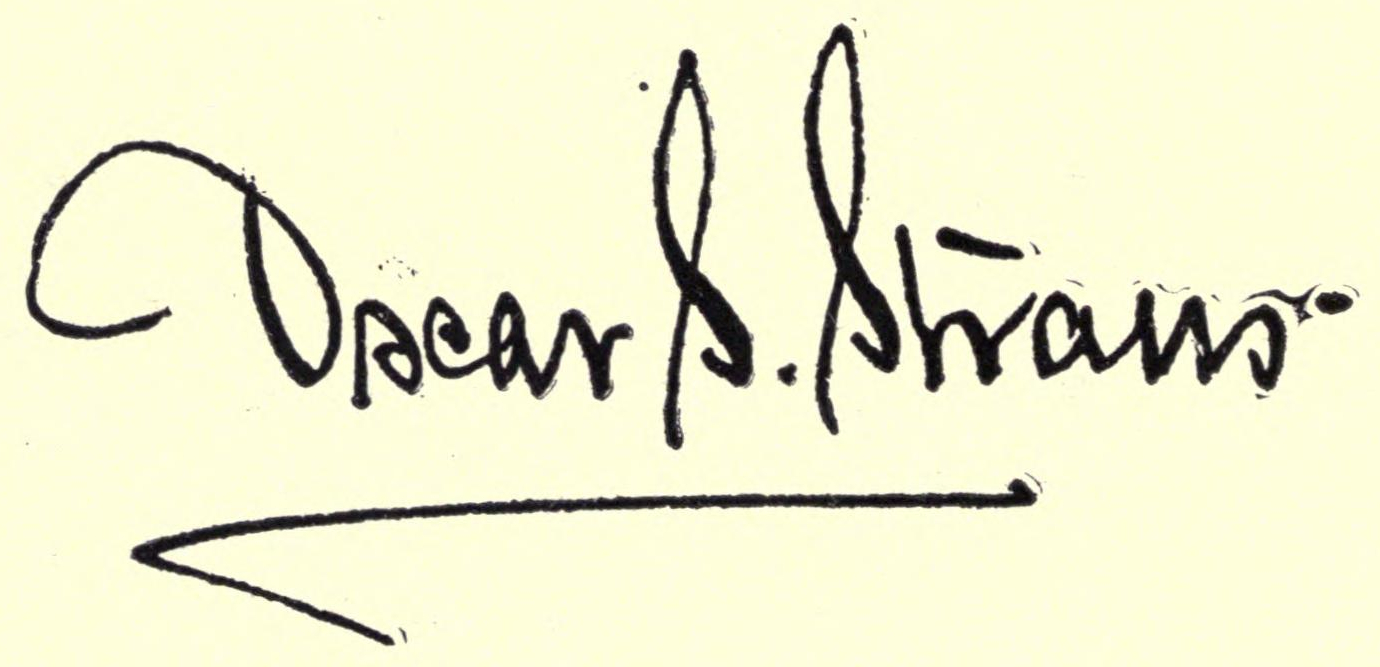
- Signature

Oscar Solomon Straus (December 23, 1850 – May 3, 1926) was an American politician and diplomat. He served as United States Secretary of Commerce and Labor under President Theodore Roosevelt from 1906 to 1909. He was the first Jewish United States Cabinet Secretary.

Straus also served in four presidential administrations as America's representative to the Ottoman Empire and ran for Governor of New York in 1912 as the candidate of then-former president Theodore Roosevelt's Progressive "Bull Moose" Party, in tandem with Roosevelt's own unsuccessful run for a nonconsecutive third term as president that same year.

== Early life and education ==
Oscar Straus was born to a German Jewish family in Otterberg in the former Palatinate, then ruled by the Kingdom of Bavaria (now part of present-day Germany), the third child of Lazarus Straus (1809–1898) and his second wife, Sara (1823–1876). His siblings were Hermine Straus Kohns (1846–1922), Isidor Straus (1845–1912), and Nathan Straus (1848–1931). The family moved to the U.S. state of Georgia in 1854. The Straus family owned slaves and conducted business with other slave owners, taking several formerly enslaved people to the North with the family following the defeat of the Confederacy.

At the close of the Civil War he moved to New York City where he graduated from Columbia College in 1871 and Columbia Law School in 1873. He practiced law until 1881, and then became a merchant, retaining his interest in literature.

== Minister to the Ottoman Empire ==
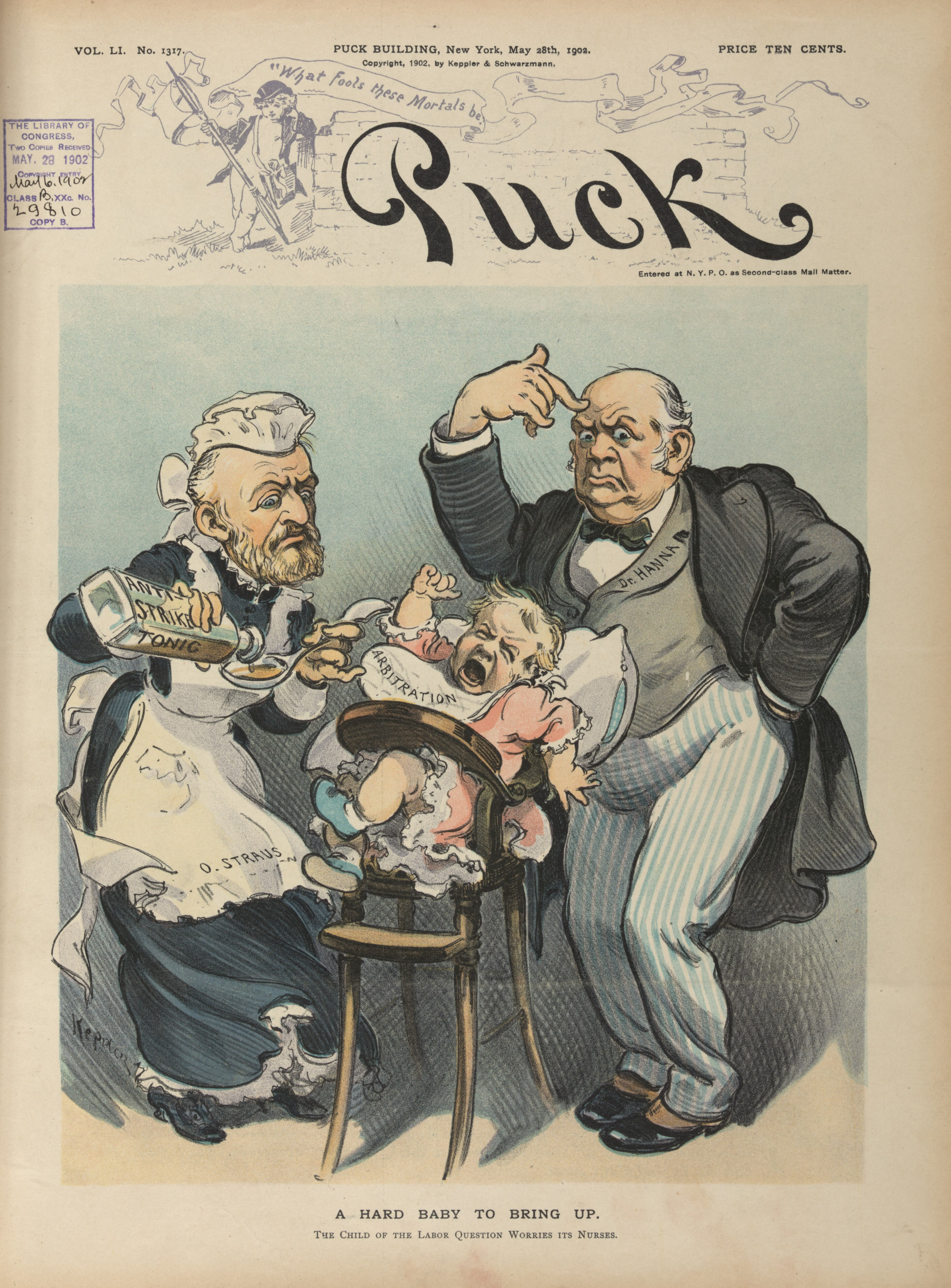
"A Hard Baby to Bring Up," a caricature of Straus and Mark Hanna by Udo Keppler on the cover of Puck, May 28, 1902

He first served as United States Minister to the Ottoman Empire from 1887 to 1889 and again from 1898 to 1899. Upon his arrival to Constantinople, he was said to have been given a "cordial welcome".

At the outbreak of the Philippine–American War in 1899, Secretary of State John Hay asked Straus to approach Sultan Abdul Hamid II to request that the Sultan write a letter to the Moro Sulu Muslims of the Sulu Sultanate telling them to submit to American suzerainty and American military rule. The Sulu sultanate agreed, with Straus writing that the "Sulu Mohammedans ... refused to join the insurrectionists and had placed themselves under the control of our army, thereby recognizing American sovereignty."

President McKinley sent a personal letter of thanks to Straus and said that its accomplishment had saved the United States at least twenty thousand troops in the field."

The Moro Rebellion then broke out in 1904 with war raging between the Americans and Moro Muslims and atrocities committed against Moro Muslim women and children such as the Moro Crater Massacre.

On January 14, 1902, he was named a member of the Permanent Court of Arbitration at The Hague to fill the place left vacant by the death of former President Benjamin Harrison.

== Secretary of Commerce and Labor ==
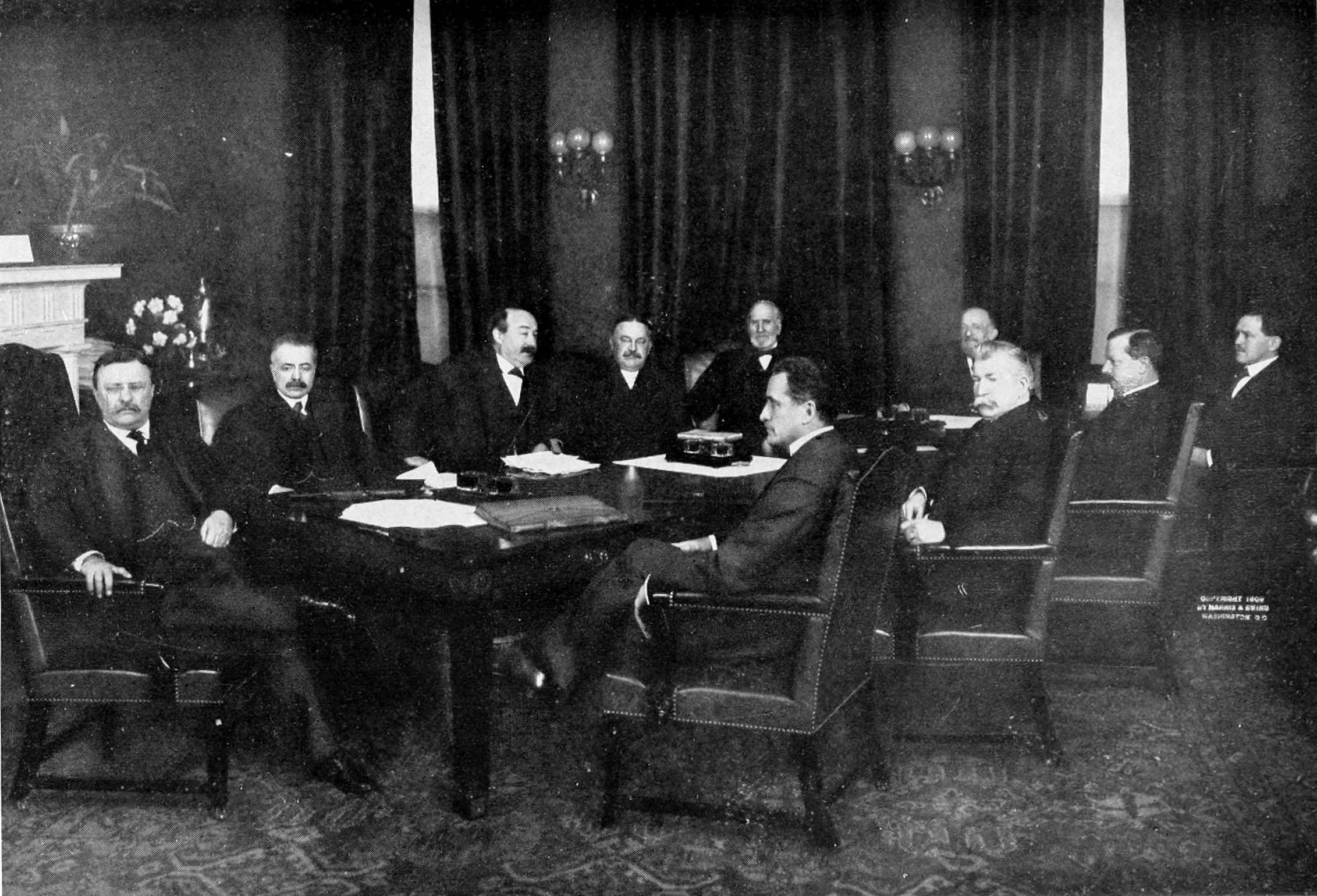
Roosevelt's cabinet on his last day in office, 1909. Straus is seated across the table from Roosevelt.

In December 1906, Straus became the United States Secretary of Commerce and Labor under President Theodore Roosevelt. The position also placed him in charge of the US Bureau of Immigration. During his tenure, Straus ordered immigration inspectors to work closely with local police and the United States Secret Service to find, arrest, and deport immigrants with anarchist political beliefs under the terms of the Anarchist Exclusion Act.

== Return to Ambassador ==
Straus left the Commerce Department in 1909 when William Howard Taft became president. Taft appointed him U.S. Ambassador to the Ottoman Empire in 1909. During the Taft administration, an American strategy was to become involved in business transactions, rather than military confrontations, a policy known as Dollar Diplomacy. It failed with respect to the Ottoman Empire because of opposition from Straus, who served until 1910, and to the Ottoman vacillation under pressure from the entrenched European powers, which did not wish to see American competition. American trade remained a minor factor.

== Later life and death ==
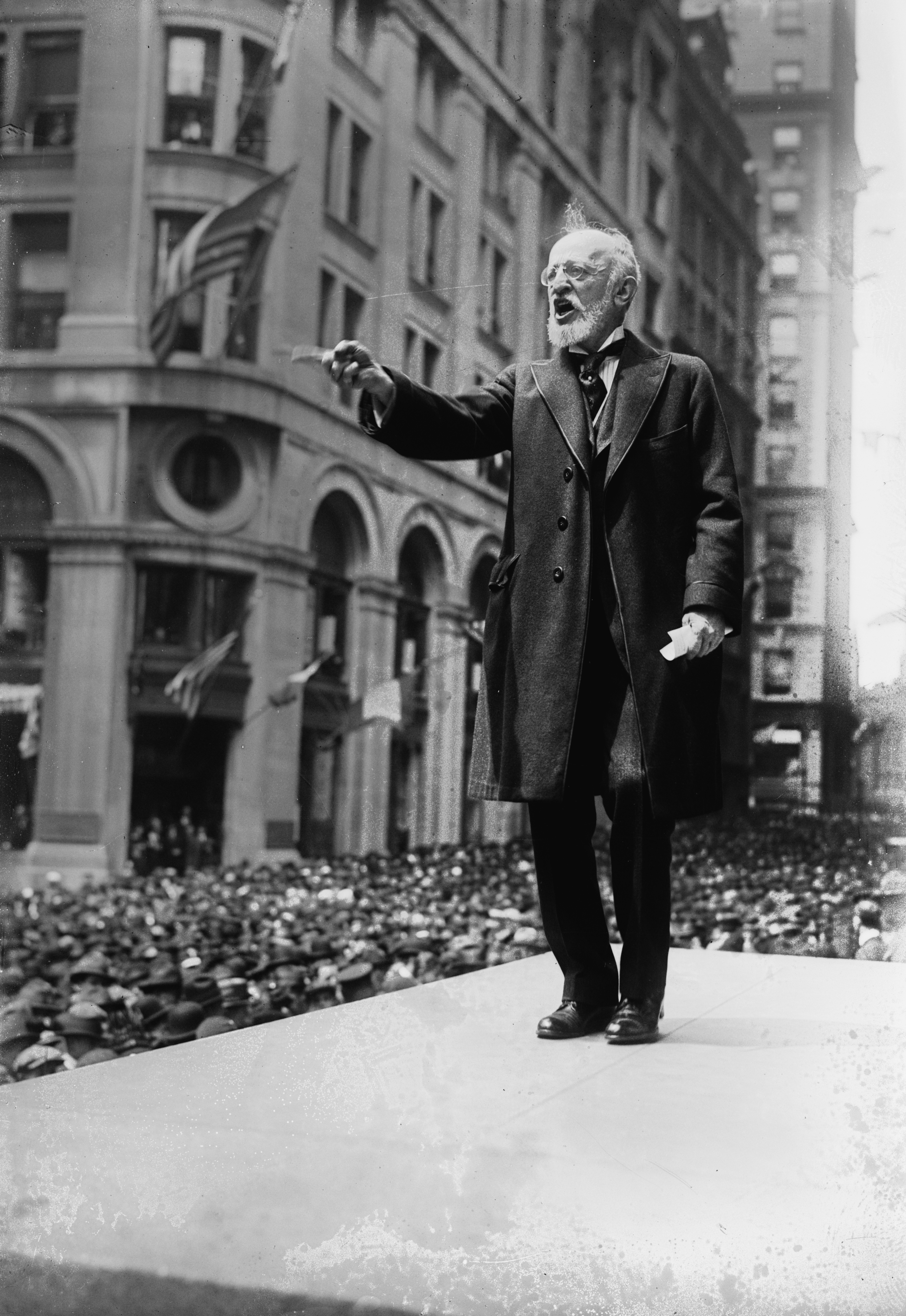
Straus speaks at a liberty bond rally in front of Federal Hall in Manhattan, New York, May 1918

In 1912, Straus ran unsuccessfully for Governor of New York on the Progressive and Independence League tickets. In 1915, he became chairman of the public service commission of New York State. He was elected to the American Philosophical Society in 1917. In 1919, he was a delegate representing the League to Enforce Peace at the Versailles Peace Conference. He was also president of the American Jewish Historical Society.

Film of Straus in his office c. 1910s

Straus died of a heart attack at his home in Manhattan on May 3, 1926. His funeral was conducted by rabbi Stephen Samuel Wise and George Foster Peabody, a childhood friend of Straus's, spoke at the service. He was buried at Beth El Cemetery in Ridgewood, New York.

== Family ==
The Straus family had several influential members including Straus's grandsons Roger W. Straus, Jr., who started the publishing company of Farrar, Straus and Giroux, and Oscar Schafer, is chairman emeritus of the New York Philharmonic; his brother, Isidor Straus, who perished aboard the RMS Titanic in 1912, served as a representative from New York City's 15th District, and was co-owner of the department store R. H. Macy & Co. along with another brother, Nathan; and nephew Jesse Isidor Straus, confidant of Franklin Delano Roosevelt and Ambassador to France from 1933 to 1936.

In 1882, Straus married Sarah Lavanburg. They had three children: Mildred Straus Schafer (born 1883), Aline Straus Hockstader (born 1889), and Roger Williams Straus (born 1891).

The family's household goods from their Washington home were sold at an auction by C.G. Sloan held March 25, 26, and 27, 1909.

== Legacy ==
Straus's achievements are commemorated by the Oscar Straus Memorial in Washington, D.C.

== Under Four Administrations gallery ==
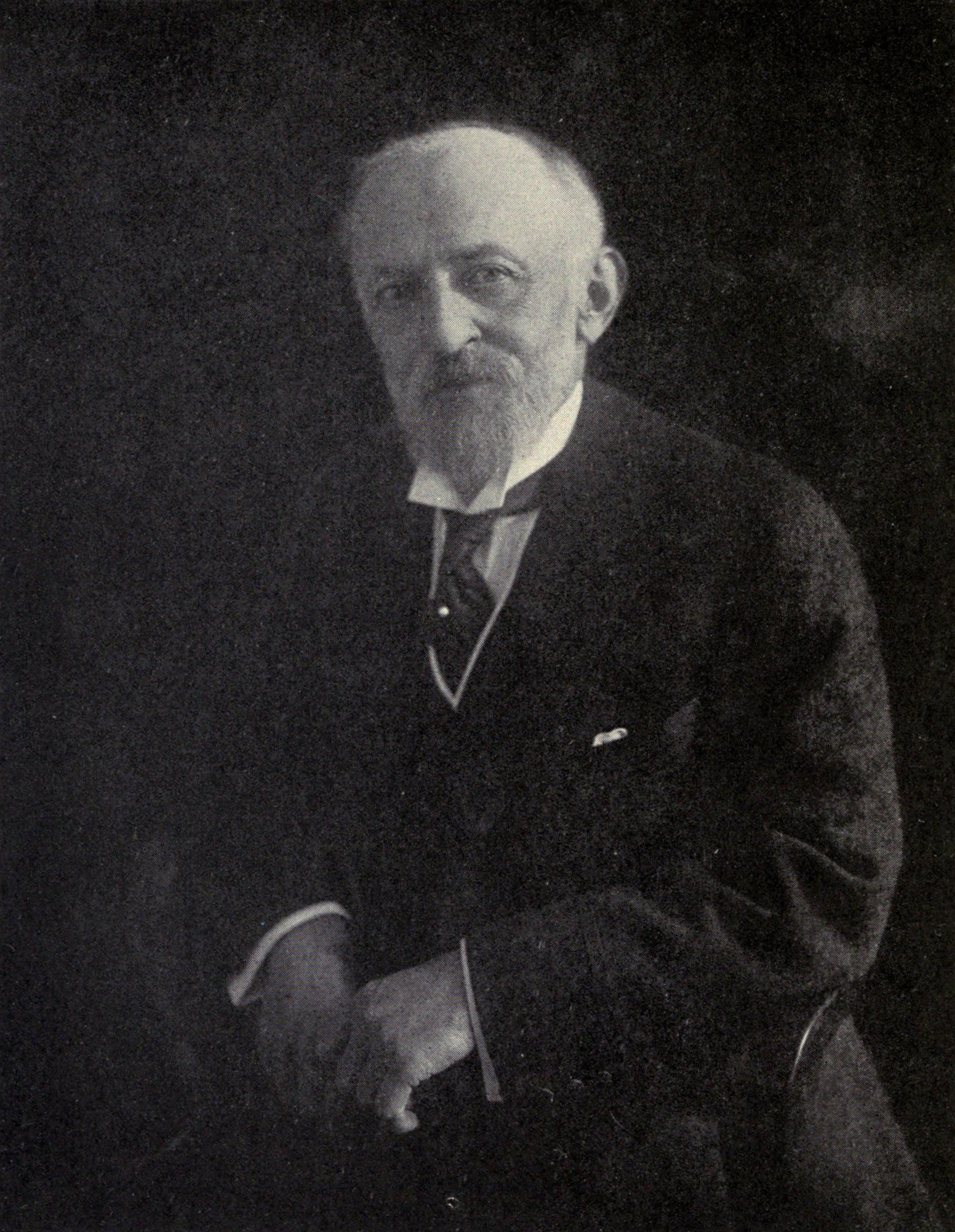
Oscar S. Straus

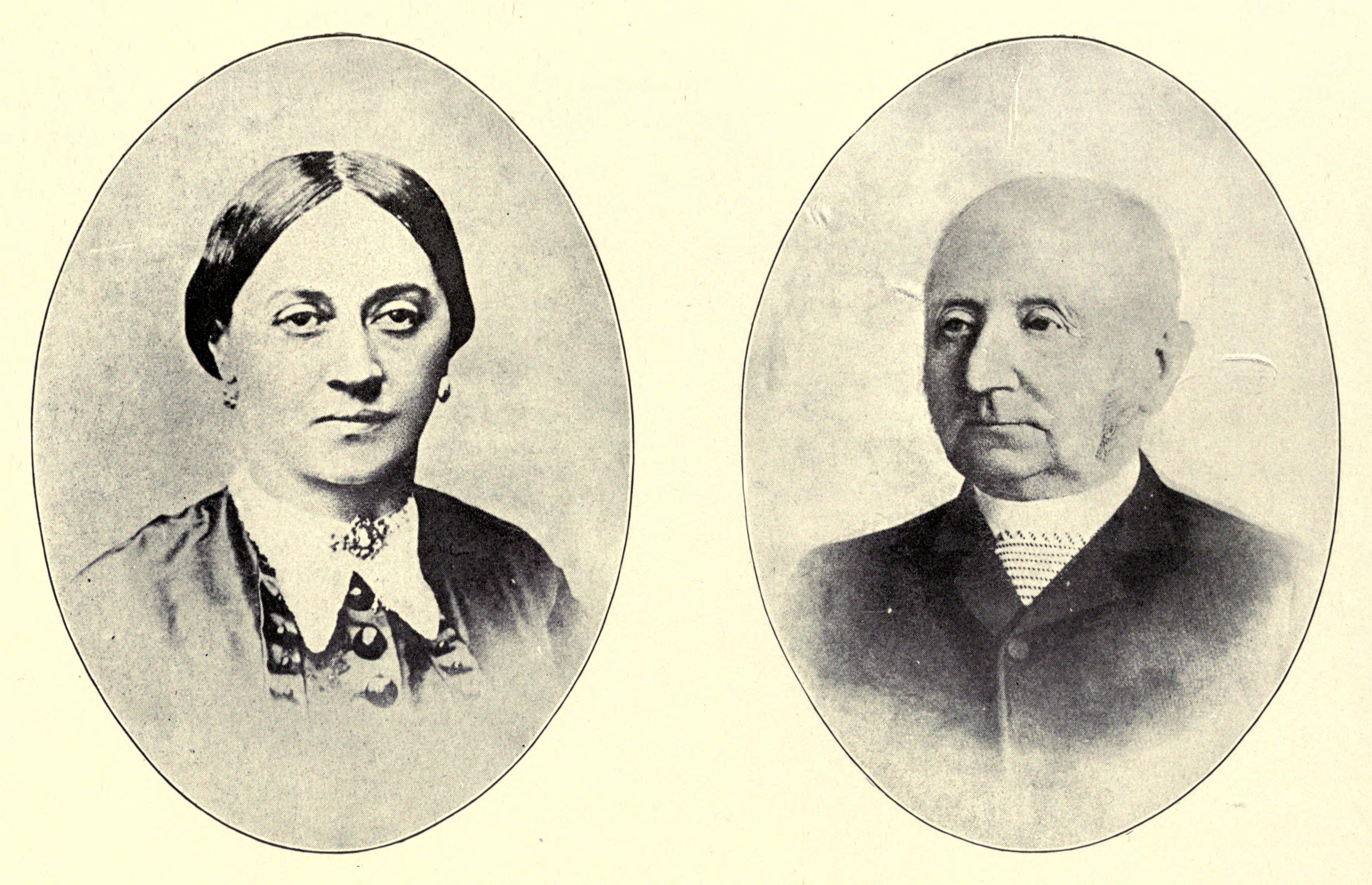
Mother and Father of Oscar S. Straus

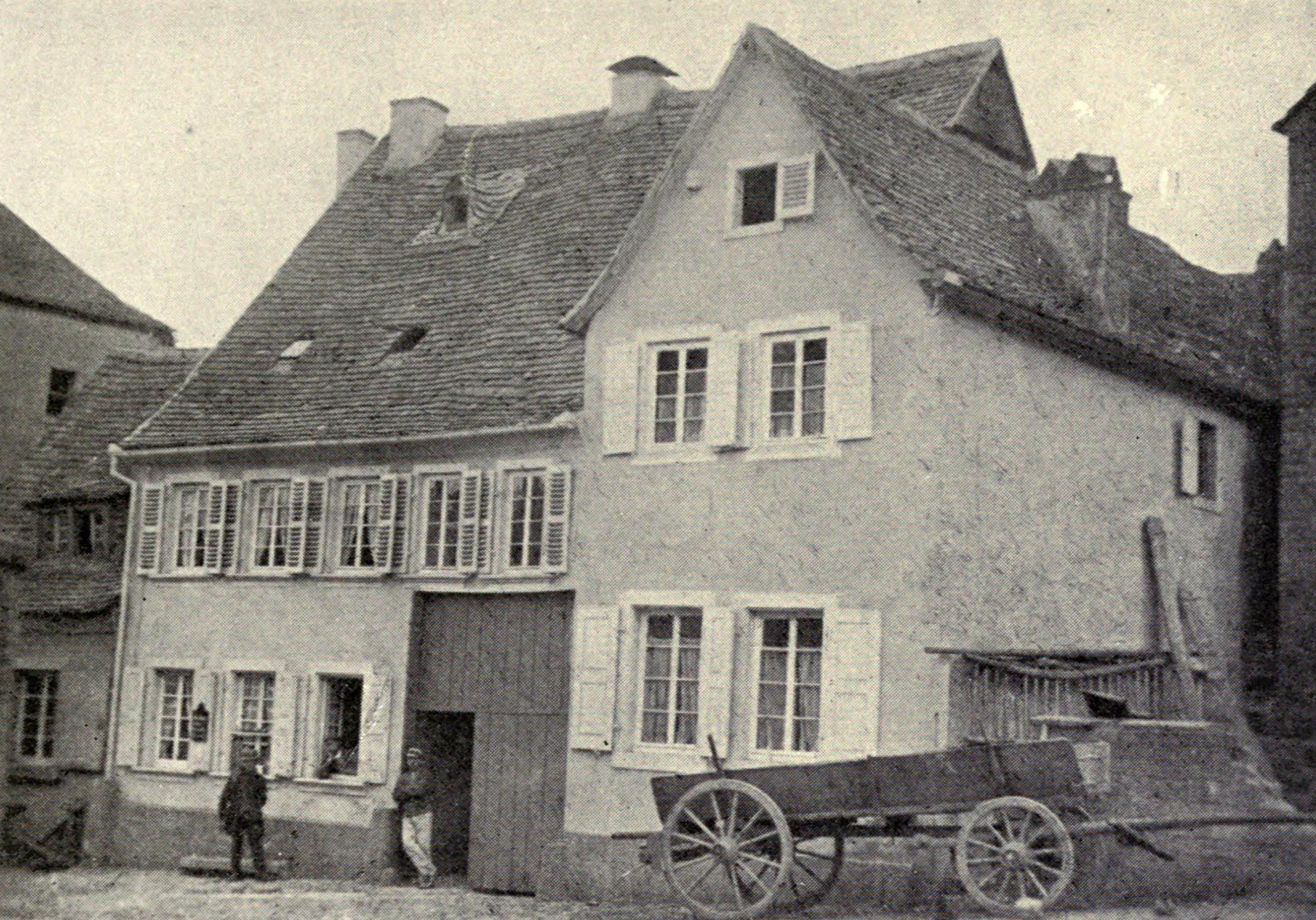
Birthplace of Oscar S. Straus, Otterberg, Rhenish Bavaria

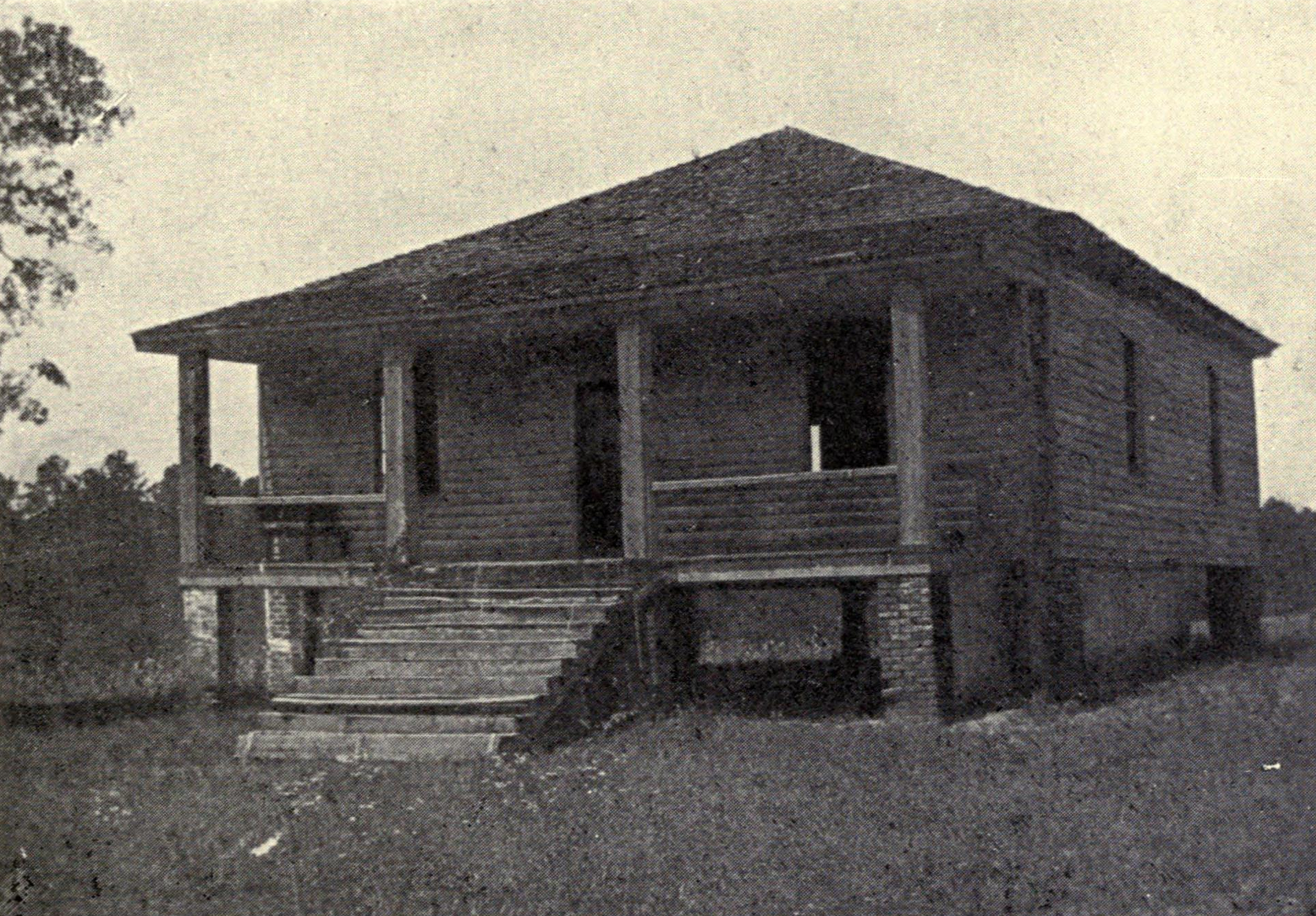
Chapel and Schoolhouse, Collinsworth Institute, Talbotton, Georgia

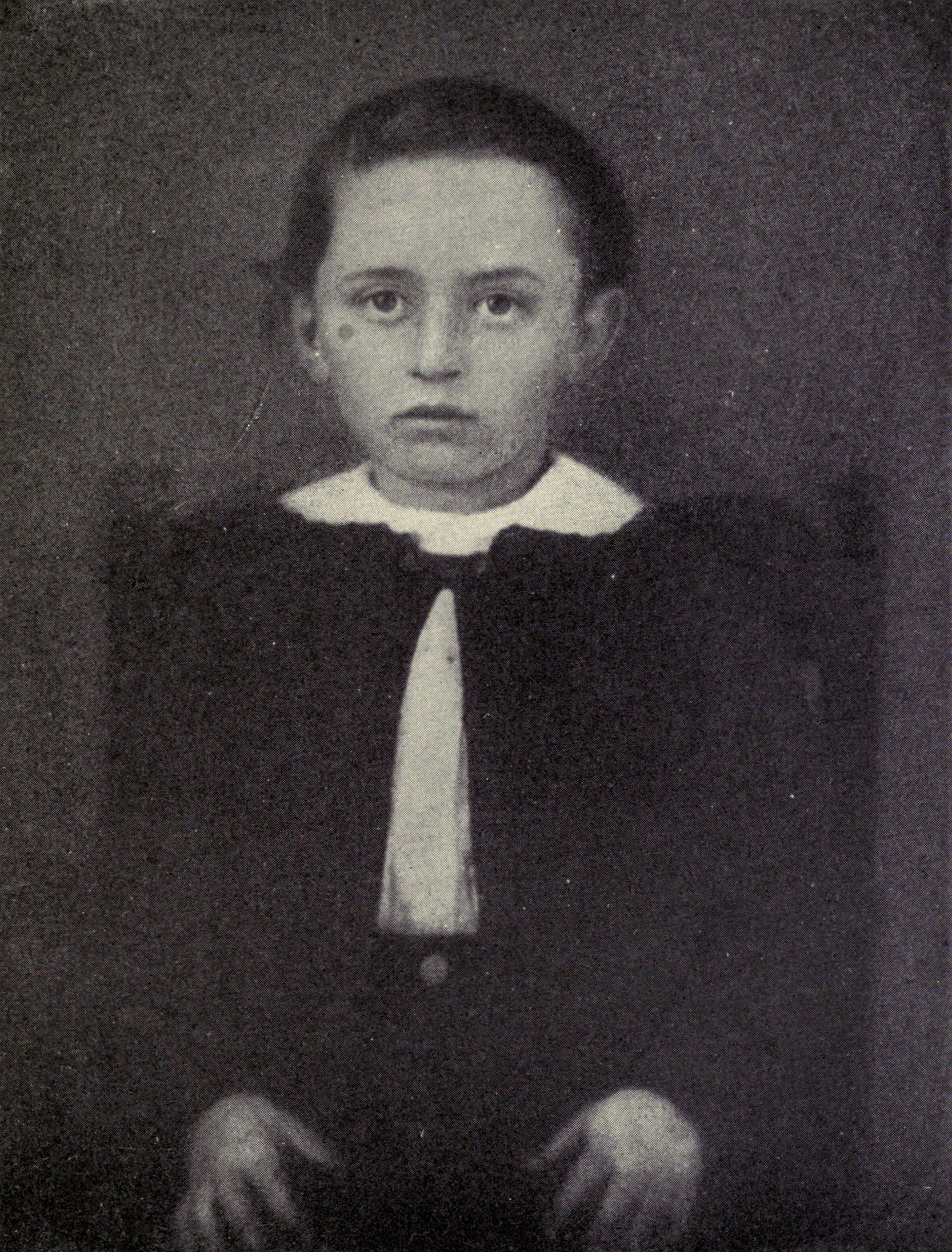
Oscar S. Straus at six

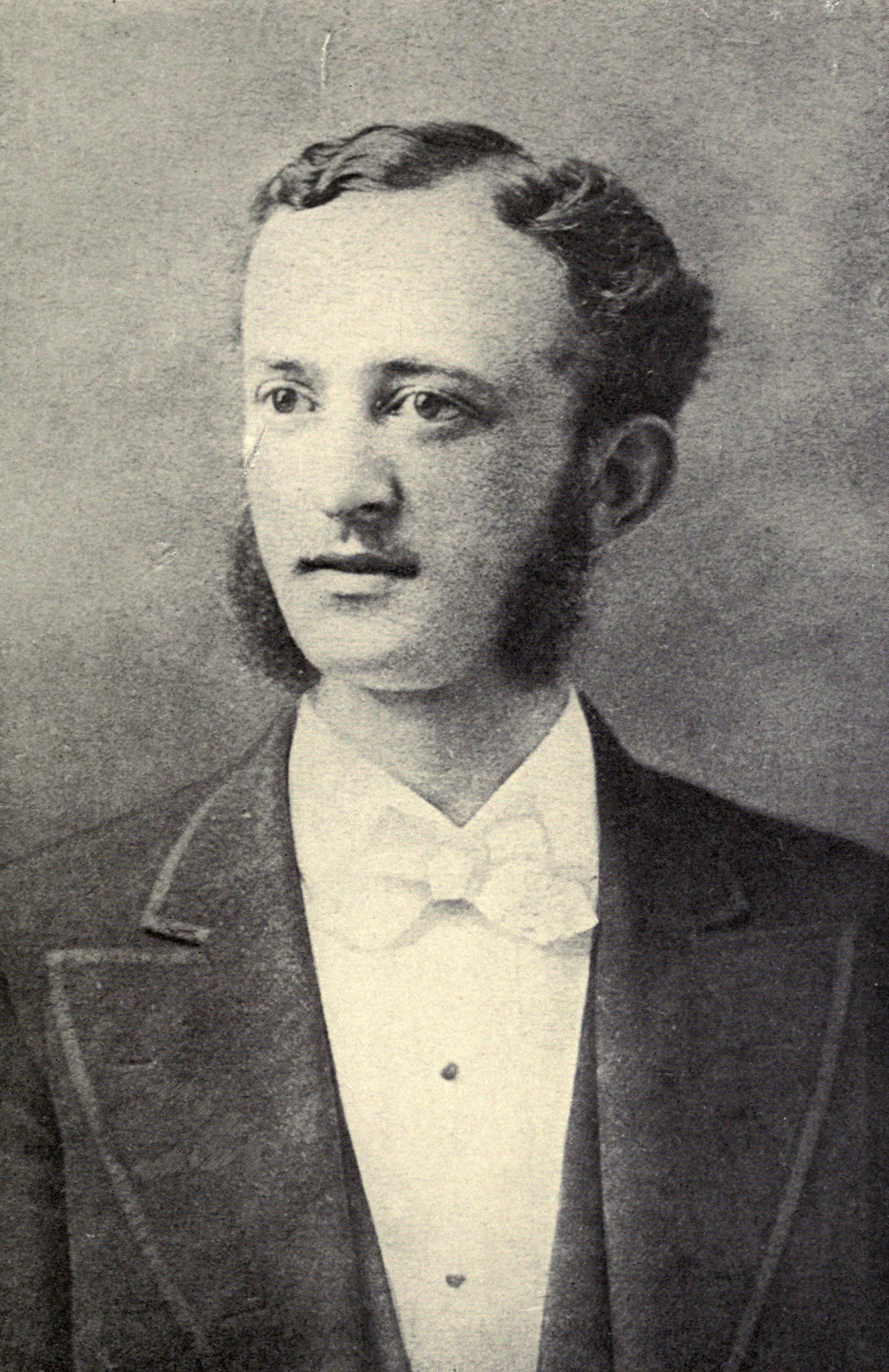
Oscar S. Straus at the time of his graduation

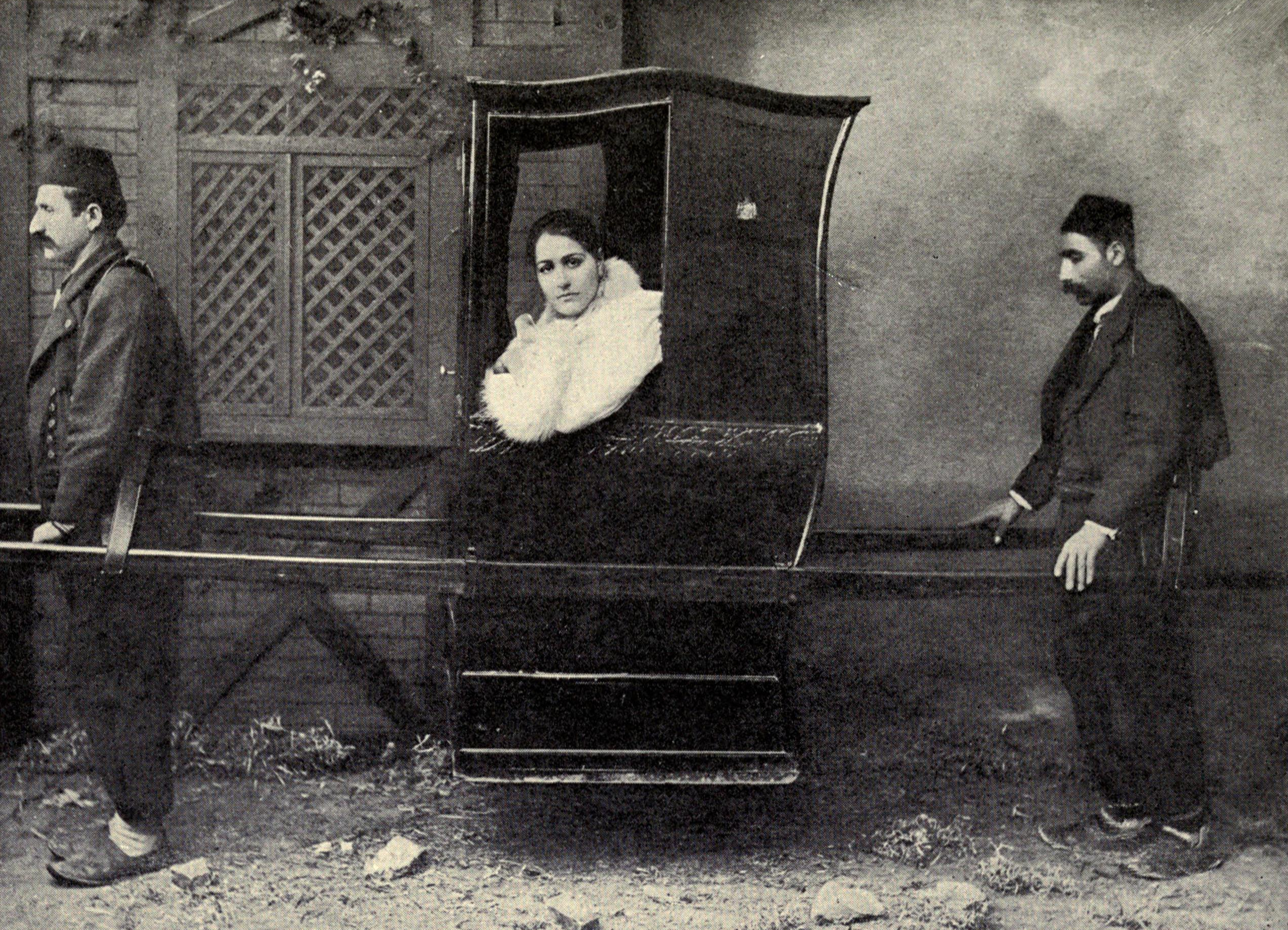
Mrs. Straus in Turkey

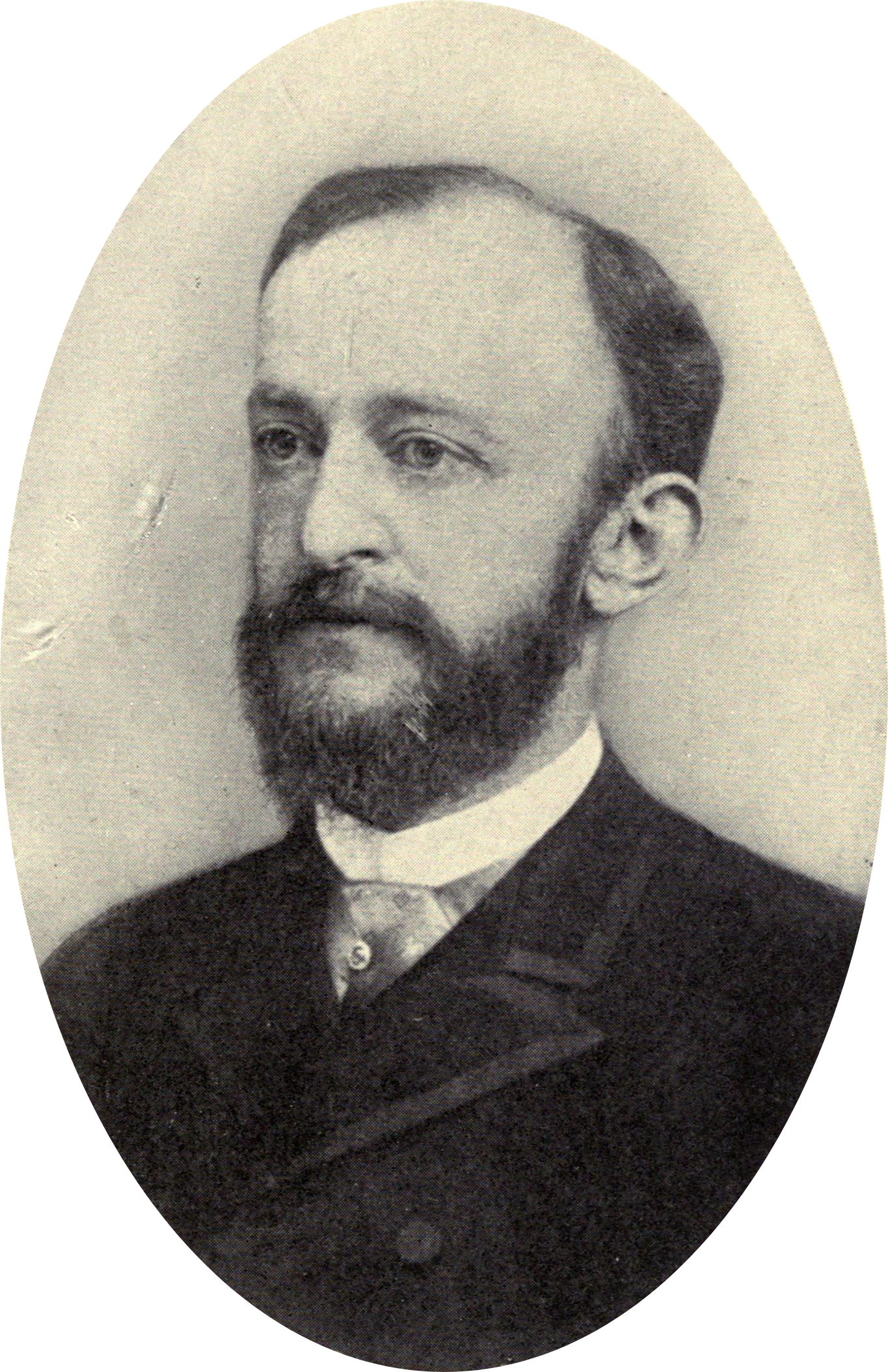
Oscar S. Straus, Constantinople, 1888

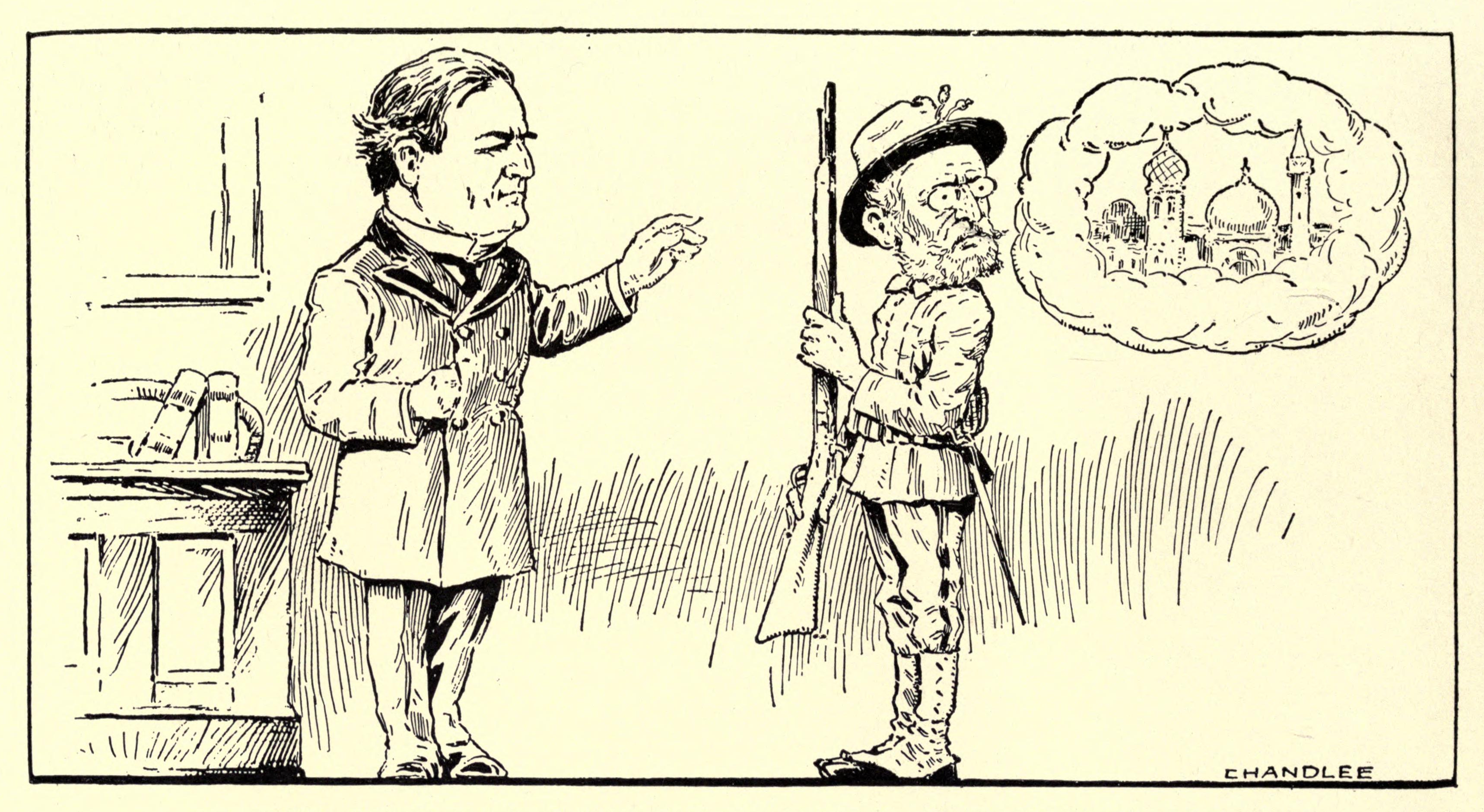
President McKinley sending the author to Turkey on his second mission, 1898

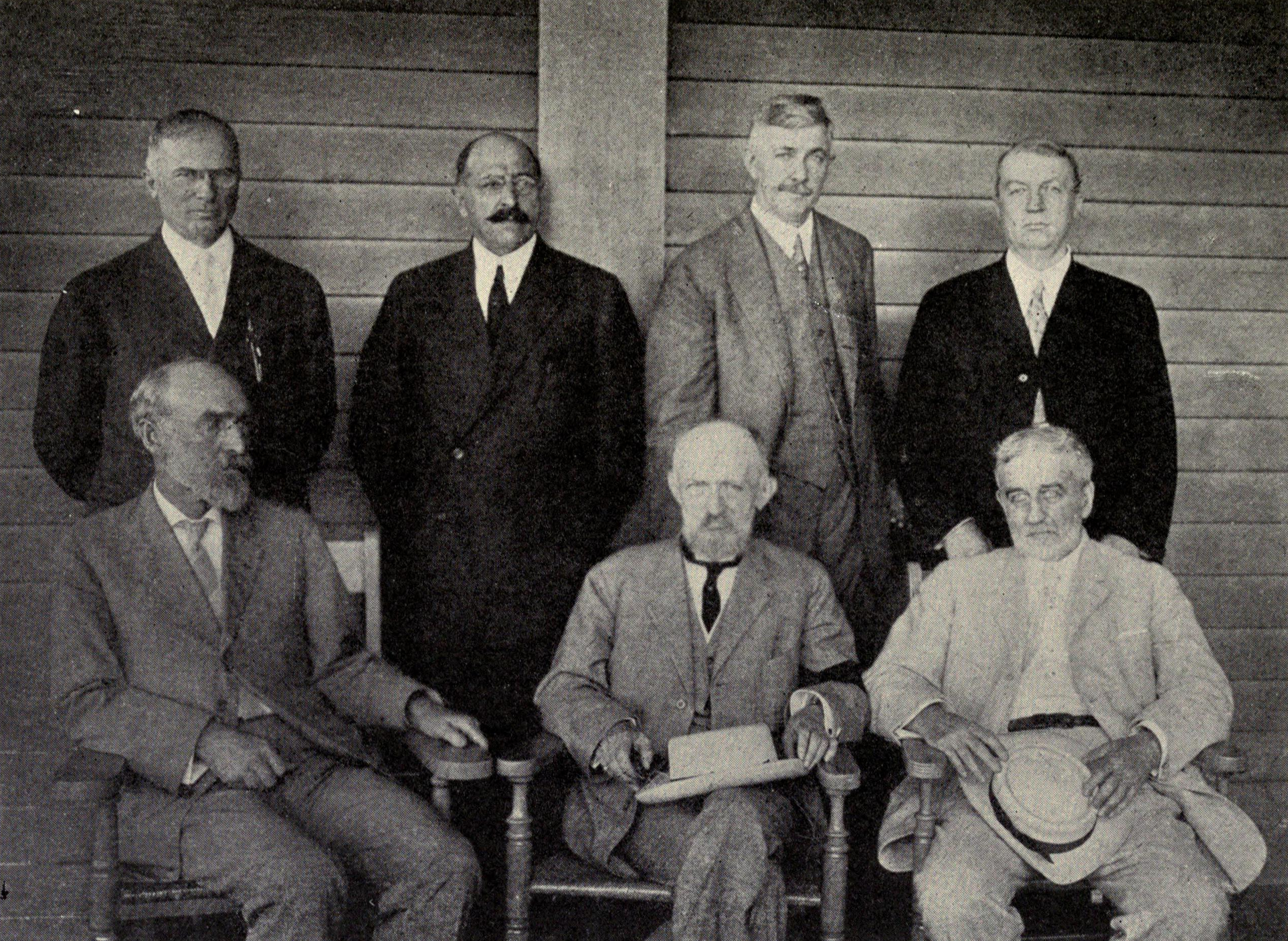
Members of the Railway Board of Arbitration

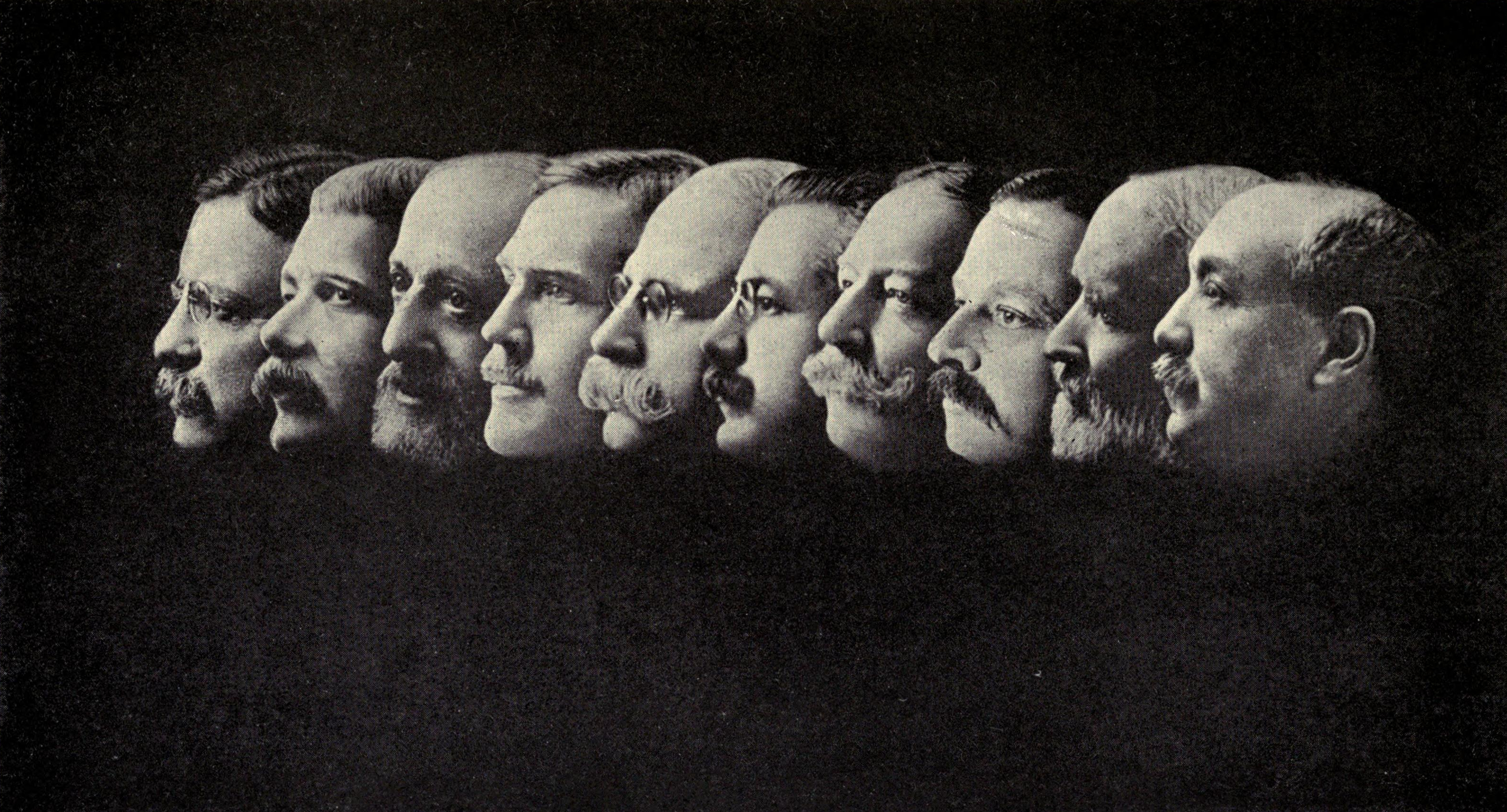
The Roosevelt Cabinet

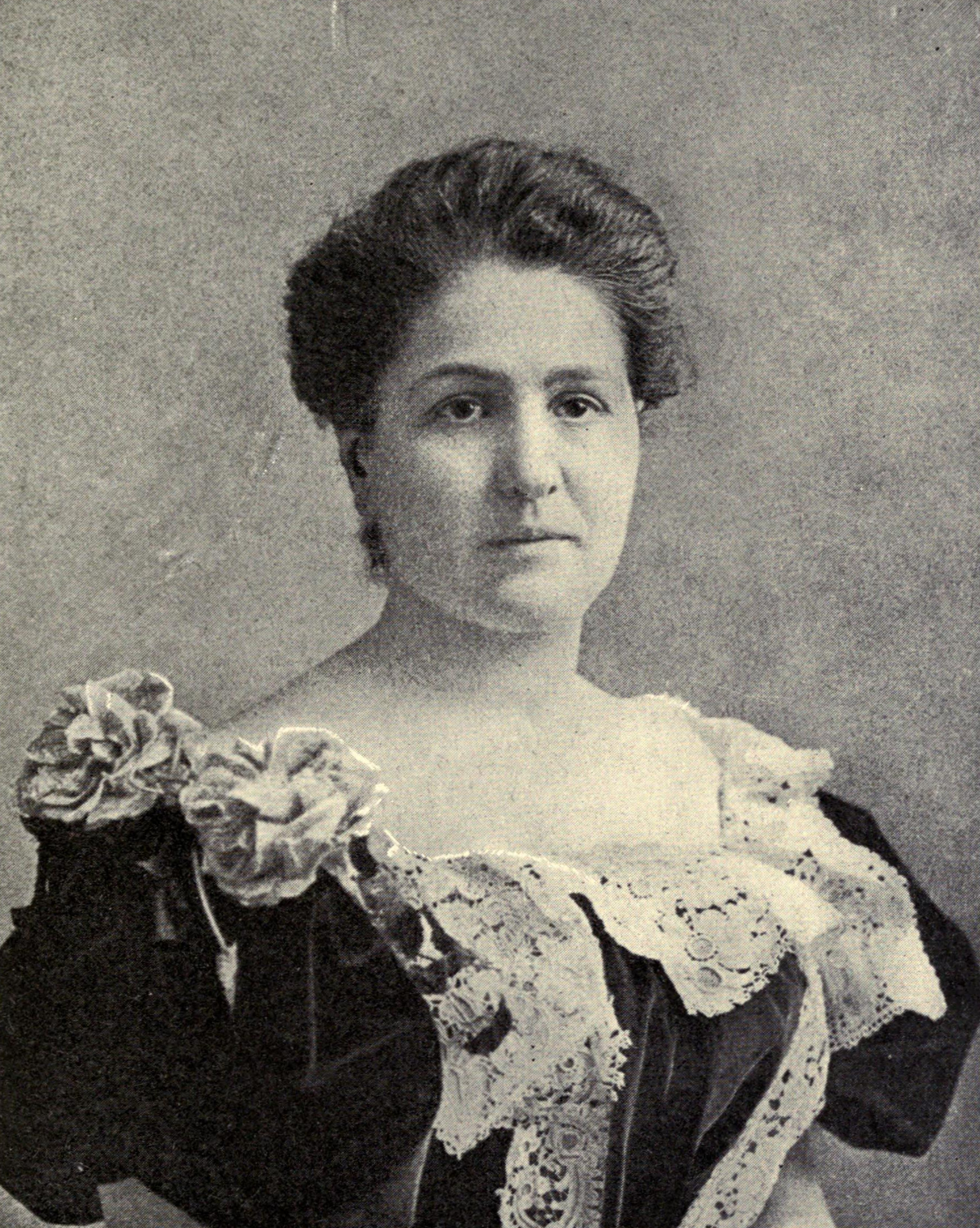
Mrs. Oscar S. Straus

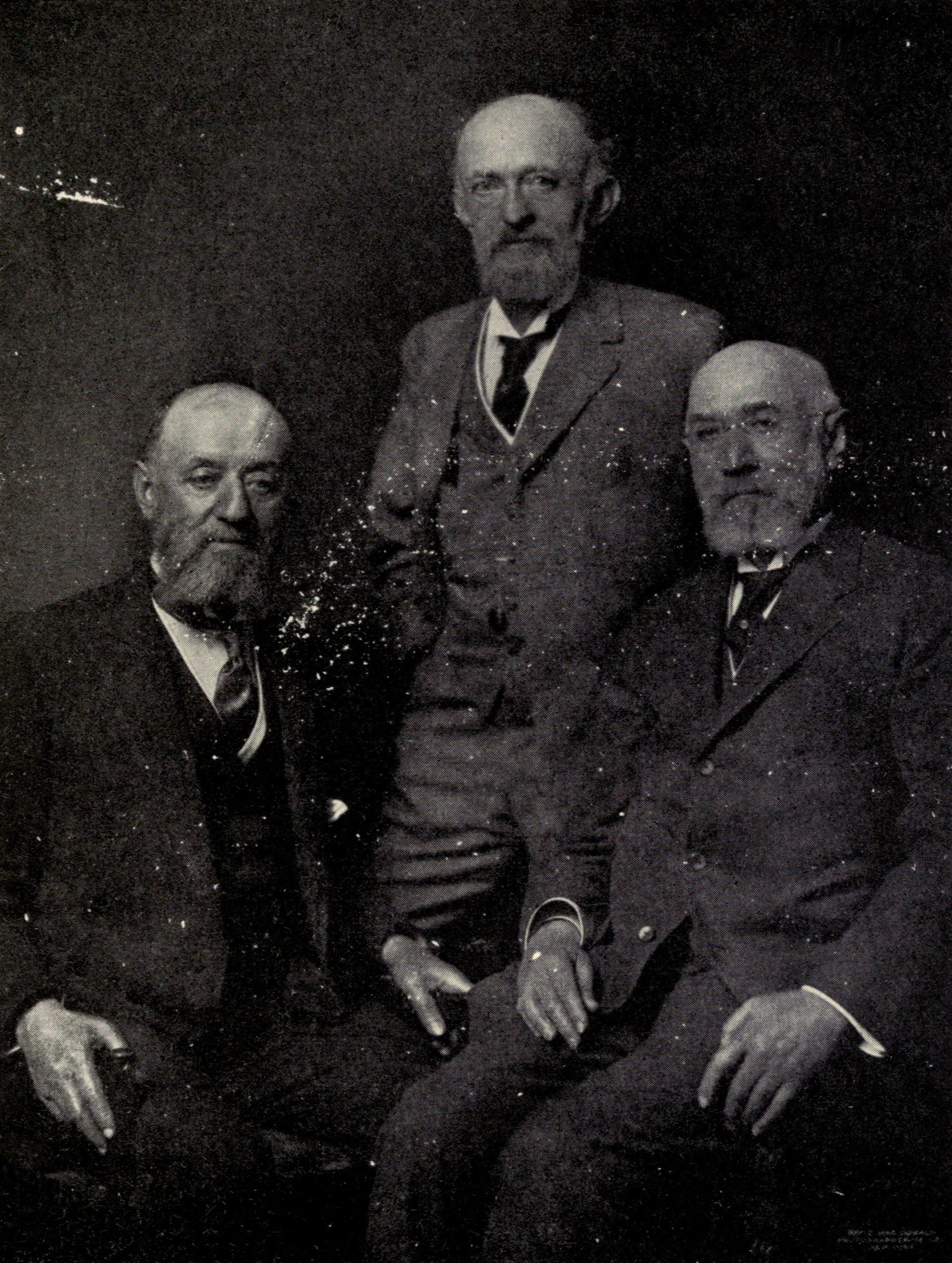
Nathan, Oscar, and Isidor Straus, 1912

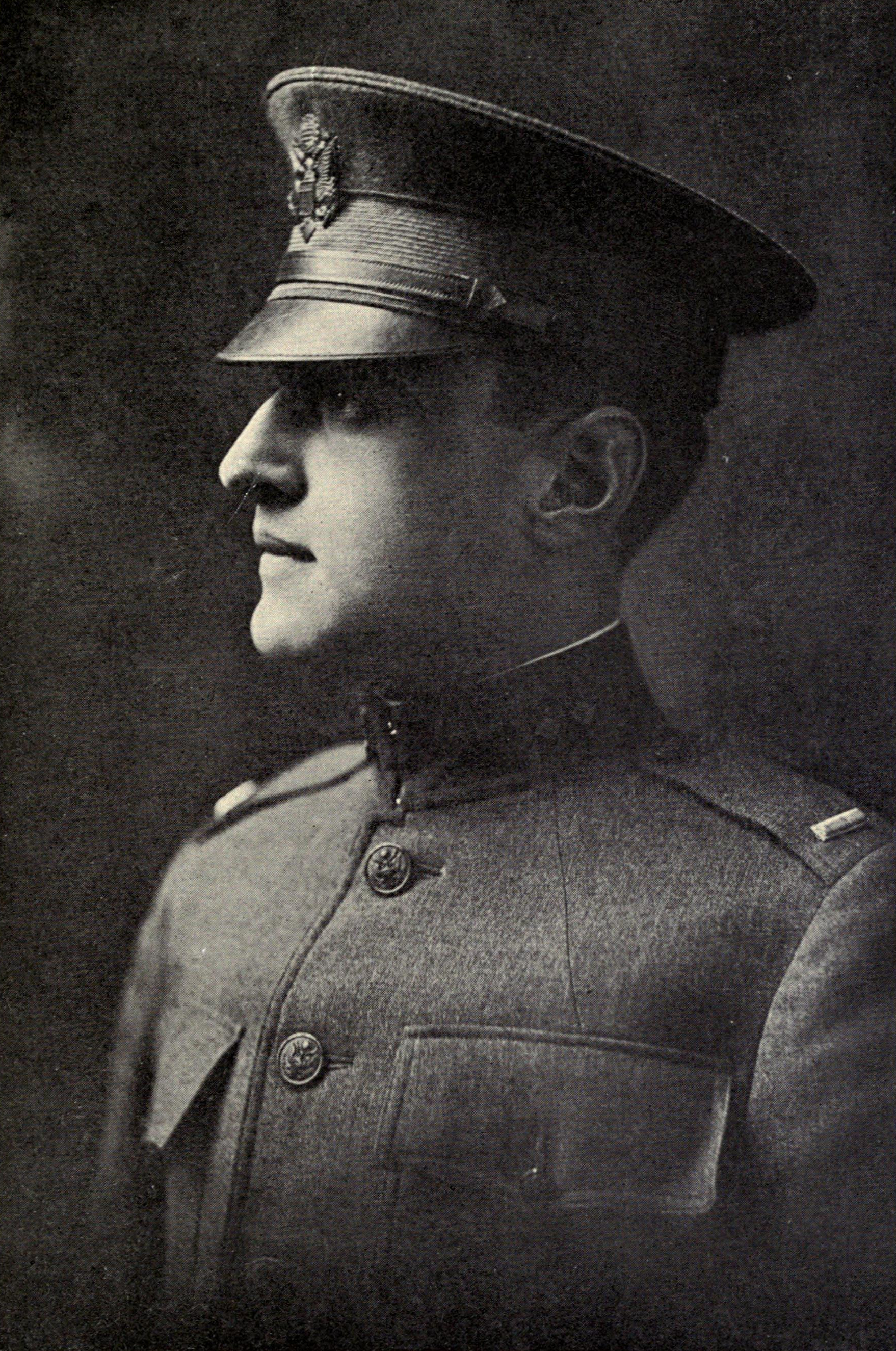
Roger W. Straus

== Works ==
- The Origin of the Republican Form of Government in the United States (1886)
- Roger Williams, the Pioneer of Religious Liberty (1894)
- The Development of Religious Liberty in the United States (1896)
- Reform in the Consular Service (1897)
- United States Doctrine of Citizenship (1901)
- Our Diplomacy with Reference to our Foreign Service (1902)
- The American Spirit (1913)
- Under Four Administrations, his memoirs (1922)

== See also ==
- List of foreign-born United States Cabinet members
- List of Jewish United States Cabinet members

Party political offices
Preceded by None	Progressive Nominee for Governor of New York; 1912	Succeeded by Frederick M. Davenport
Diplomatic posts
Preceded by Samuel S. Cox	United States Envoy to the Ottoman Empire; 1887–1889	Succeeded by Solomon Hirsch
Preceded by James Angell	United States Minister to the Ottoman Empire; 1898–1899	Succeeded by John Leishman
Preceded by John Leishman	United States Ambassador to the Ottoman Empire; 1909–1910	Succeeded by William Rockhill
Political offices
Preceded by Victor H. Metcalf	United States Secretary of Commerce and Labor; 1906–1909	Succeeded by Charles Nagel
