= List of nominees for the Nobel Prize in Physiology or Medicine (1920–1929) =

The following is a list of people first nominated for the Nobel Prize in Physiology or Medicine between 1920 and 1929 by year of first nomination.

The Nobel Prize in Physiology or Medicine (Swedish: Nobelpriset i fysiologi eller medicin) is awarded annually by the Nobel Assembly at the Karolinska Institute to scientists who have made outstanding contributions in physiology or medicine. It is one of the five Nobel Prizes which were established by the will of Alfred Nobel in 1895.

Every year, the Nobel Committee for Physiology or Medicine sends out forms, which amount to a personal and exclusive invitation, to about three thousand selected individuals to invite them to submit nominations. The names of the nominees are never publicly announced, and neither are they told that they have been considered for the Prize. Nomination records are strictly sealed for fifty years. However, the nominations for the years 1901 to 1953 are publicly available. Despite the annual sending of invitations, the prize was not awarded in nine years (1915–1918, 1921, 1925, 1940–1942) and has been delayed for a year five times (1919, 1922, 1926, 1938, 1943).

From 1901 to 1953, 935 scientists were nominated for the prize, 63 of which were awarded either jointly or individually. 19 more scientists from these nominees were awarded after 1953. Of the 13 women nominees, only G.Th.Cori was awarded the prize. Besides some scientists from these nominees won the prizes in other fields (including years after 1953): J.Boyd Orr - Peace Prize (1949); L.C.Pauling twice - in Chemistry (1954) and Peace Prize (1962); 3 - in Physics and 20 - in Chemistry (including Fr.Sanger twice - in 1958 and 1980).

In addition, nominations of 65 scientists (including one woman) were declared invalid by the Nobel Committee.

== See also ==
- List of nominees for the Nobel Prize in Physiology or Medicine (1901–1909)
- List of nominees for the Nobel Prize in Physiology or Medicine (1910–1919)
- List of nominees for the Nobel Prize in Physiology or Medicine (1930–1939)
- List of nominees for the Nobel Prize in Physiology or Medicine (1940–1949)
- List of nominees for the Nobel Prize in Physiology or Medicine (1950–1959)

== 1920–1929 ==
Picture	Name	Born	Died	Years nominated	Notes
1920
	Johannes Fibiger (Note: "Work on the physiology and pathology of the vestibular apparatus and cerebellum")	23 April 1867 Silkeborg, Denmark	30 January 1928 Copenhagen, Denmark	1920, 1921, 1922, 1923, 1924, 1925, 1926, 1927, 1928	Won the 1926 Nobel Prize in Physiology or Medicine a year later (Note: "for his discovery of the Spiroptera carcinoma")
	Thomas Hunt Morgan (Note: "Investigations on the physiology of development (experimental embryology), on the physiology of regeneration and in genetics")	25 September 1866 Lexington, Kentucky, United States	4 December 1945 Pasadena, California, United States	1920, 1921, 1923, 1924, 1925, 1926, 1928, 1929, 1930, 1931, 1932, 1933, 1934	Won the 1933 Nobel Prize in Physiology or Medicine (Note: "for his discoveries concerning the role played by the chromosome in heredity")
	John Brian Christopherson (Note: "Work on vaccination against typhus fever")	30 April 1868 Batley, Yorkshire, England, United Kingdom	21 July 1955 Lydney, England, United Kingdom	1920	
	Luis Agote	22 September 1868 Buenos Aires, Argentina	12 November 1954 Turdera, Argentina	1920	Nominated jointly (Note: "Improvements of the human blood transfusion method") by V.Izq.Sanfuentes the only time
	Émile Jeanbrau	1 October 1873 Alès, France	14 May 1950 Montpellier, France	1920	Nominated jointly by V.Izq.Sanfuentes the only time
	Richard Lewisohn	12 July 1875 Hamburg, German Empire	11 August 1961 New York, United States	1920	Nominated jointly by V.Izq.Sanfuentes the only time
	Erich Lexer (Note: "Work on surgery")	22 May 1867 Freiburg im Breisgau, Grand Duchy of Baden	4 December 1937 Berlin, Nazi Germany	1920	Nominated by K.Alb.L.Aschoff the only time
	Hans Held (Note: "Work on nerve histology")	8 August 1866 Neukloster, Duchy of Mecklenburg-Schwerin, German Confederation	8 December or 15, 1942 Leipzig, Nazi Germany	1920	Nominated by F.Sieglbauer the only time
	Antonio Grossich (Note: "The introduction of iodine tincture for disinfection of the area for operation")	7 June 1849 Draguć, Austrian Empire	1 October 1926 Fiume, Kingdom of Italy	1920	Nominated by F.Krause the only time
	Rufus Cole (Note: "Work upon lobar pneumonia")	30 April 1872 Rowsburg, Ohio, United States	20 April 1966 Washington, D.C., United States	1920	Nominated by L.Emm.Holt the only time
	Antoine Depage (Note: "for his work on war surgery")	28 November 1862 Watermael-Boitsfort, Belgium	10 June 1925 The Hague, Netherlands	1920	Nominated by professor Baron from Dijon the only time
	Arthur Biedl (Note: "for his work on endocrine secretion")	4 October 1869 Kiskomlós, Arch-Kingdom of Hungary	26 August 1933 Steinbach am Attersee, Austria	1920	Nominated by H.Preisz the only time
	Howard Taylor Ricketts (Note: "work on typhus")	9 February 1871 Findlay, Ohio, United States	3 May 1910 Mexico City, Mexico	1920	Nominated posthumously by A.Korányi the only time
	Henri Dominici (Note: "for work on radiotherapy")	1867 Stretford, England	21 May 1919 Paris, France	1920	Nominated posthumously by A.Korányi the only time
	Karl Oskar Medin (Note: "for work on poliomyelitis")	14 August 1847 Axberg, Närke, Sweden	24 December 1927 Stockholm, Sweden	1920	Nominated by J.Bókay, Jr. the only time
	Gustav Killian (Note: "The introduction of bronchoscopy and "schwebelaryngoskopie"")	2 June 1860 Mainz, Grand Duchy of Hesse, German Confederation	24 February 1921 Berlin, Weimar Germany	1906, 1918, 1920, 1921	
	Wilhelm Johannsen (Note: "Investigations in the field of experimental genetics")	3 February 1857 Elsinore, Denmark	11 November 1927 Copenhagen, Denmark	1920, 1923	
	Leonardo Bianchi (Note: "Work on the frontal and parietal lobes")	5 April 1848 San Bartolomeo in Galdo, Kingdom of the Two Sicilies	13 February 1927 Naples, Kingdom of Italy	1918, 1920, 1921, 1922, 1926, 1927	
	Heinrich Braun (Note: "Work on the infiltrational anaesthesia")	1 January 1862 Rawitsch, Province of Posen, Kingdom of Prussia	26 April 1934 Überlingen, Weimar Germany	1920, 1930, 1933	
	Oscar Bernhard (Note: "Work on treatment with sunlight")	24 May 1861 Samedan, Switzerland	14 November 1939 St. Moritz, Switzerland	1920, 1924, 1927, 1929, 1932	
	Auguste Rollier (Note: "Work on treatment with sunlight")	1 October 1874 Saint-Aubin, Fribourg, Switzerland	30 October 1954 Vaud, Switzerland	1920, 1924, 1930, 1932, 1933	
	Alexandre Besredka (Note: "Work on vaccination against typhus fever")	29 March 1870 Odesa, Russian Empire	28 February 1940 Paris, France	1920, 1924, 1932, 1934	
	John Scott Haldane (Note: "Work on the physiology of respiration")	2 May 1860 Edinburgh, Scotland, United Kingdom	14/15 March 1936 Oxford, England	1920, 1926, 1935	
	Robert McCarrison (Note: "Researches into the etiology of endemic goitre and other diseases of the thyroid gland; and researches relating to vitamins and nutritional physiology and pathology")	15 March 1878 Portadown, Northern Ireland, United Kingdom	18 May 1960 Oxford, England	1920, 1921, 1937	
	Oskar Vogt (Note: "Work on the finer structure of the cerebral cortex")	6 April 1870 Husum, Kingdom of Prussia, North German Confederation	30 July 1959 Freiburg im Breisgau, Germany	1920, 1922, 1923, 1924, 1926, 1928, 1929, 1930, 1937, 1950, 1951, 1952, 1953, 1956	
1921
	Karl Landsteiner (Note: "Fundamental research on agglutination, hemolysis, syphilis, poliomyelitis and the chemistry of antibody production and antibody action")	14 June 1868 Baden bei Wien, Austria-Hungary	26 June 1943 New York, United States	1913, 1921, 1922, 1923, 1928, 1929, 1930, 1931	Won the 1930 Nobel Prize in Physiology or Medicine (Note: "for his discovery of human blood groups")
	Ernst Fuchs (Note: "Numeral works in the area of ophthalmiatrics")	14 June 1851 Vienna, Austrian Empire	21 November 1930 Vienna, Austria	1921	Nominated by Manuel Márquez Rodríguez the only time
	Joseph Jules Dejerine	3 August 1849 Geneva, Switzerland	26 February 1917 Paris, France	1921	Nominated posthumously with H.H.Meyer and C.von Monakow by Fr.von Müller the only time
	Charles Willems (Note: "The introduction of a new method for the treatment of acute purulent arthritis")	5 December 1859 Ghent, Belgium	19 January 1930 Liège, Belgium	1921	Nominated by William Thomas Coughlin the only time
	Arthur Isaac Kendall (Note: "Research in bacterio-chemistry and the discovery of the fundamental law underlying bacterial metabolism")	7 May 1877 Somerville, Massachusetts, United States	20 June 1959 La Jolla, United States	1921	Nominated by Frederick Robert Zeit the only time
	Pierre Marie (Note: "Work on acromegalia and on numerous nervous diseases")	9 September 1853 Paris, France	13 April 1940 Neuilly-sur-Seine, France	1921	
	Henri Duret (Note: "Work on the physiology and pathology of the brain")	7 July 1849 Condé-sur-Noireau, France	7 April 1921 Lille, France	1921, 1922	Died before the only chance to be rewarded
	Eugène Gley (Note: "Work on endocrine secretion, especially the functions of the thyroid and parathyroid glands")	18 January 1857 Épinal, France	24 October 1930 Paris, France	1915, 1920, 1921, 1922, 1923, 1924, 1925, 1926, 1927, 1928, 1931	
	Nicolas Maurice Arthus (Note: "Work on poisons and blood coagulation")	9 January 1862 Angers, France	24 February 1945 Fribourg, Switzerland	1921, 1922, 1923, 1924, 1925, 1926, 1927, 1929, 1930, 1934	
	Eugen Steinach (Note: "Work on the functions of the reproductive glands")	28 January 1861 Hohenems, Austrian Empire	14 May 1944 Territet, Switzerland	1920, 1921, 1922, 1927, 1930, 1934, 1938	
	Walter Bradford Cannon (Note: "Work on the fluoroscopic study of the motor activities of the alimentary tract, surgical shock and on internal secretion")	19 October 1871 Prairie du Chien, Wisconsin, United States	1 October 1945 Franklin, New Hampshire, United States	1921, 1928, 1929, 1930, 1931, 1932, 1934, 1935, 1936, 1937, 1939, 1940, 1941, 1942, 1945	
1922
	Edward Calvin Kendall (Note: "The purification of thyroxine and description of its structure")	8 March 1886 South Norwalk, Connecticut, United States	4 May 1972 Princeton, New Jersey, United States	1922, 1925, 1928, 1930, 1931, 1932, 1937, 1938, 1941, 1942, 1950, 1951	Shared the 1950 Nobel Prize in Physiology or Medicine with Ph.Sh.Hench and T.Reichstein (Note: "for their discoveries relating to the hormones of the adrenal cortex, their structure and biological effects") and nominated for the Nobel Prize in Chemistry too
	Benjamin Lipschütz (Note: "Work on skin diseases")	4 October 1878 Brody, Galicia, Austria-Hungary	20 December 1931 Vienna, Austria	1922	Nominated by Ludwig Merk (Graz: 1.3.1862-29.8.1925) the only time
	Bartolomeo Gosio (Note: "Work on arsenic mold")	17 March 1863 Magliano Alfieri, Kingdom of Sardinia	13 April 1944 Rome, Kingdom of Italy	1922	Nominated by Pietro Canalis (27.10.1856 Osilo - 1939) the only time
	Heinrich Jakob Bechhold (Note: "Colloid chemical work, especially elastic ultrafiltra and work on lipoids")	13 November 1866 Frankfurt am Main, Kingdom of Prussia, North German Confederation	17 February 1937 Frankfurt am Main, Nazi Germany	1922	Nominated by Richard Ritter von Zeynek (9.12.1869 Graz – 28.6.1945 Passau) the only time
	Guido Banti (Note: "Work on splenomegalia (Morbus Banti, splenomegalia haemolytica)")	8 June 1852 Montebicchieri, Grand Duchy of Tuscany	8 January 1925 Florence, Kingdom of Italy	1922	Nominated by Dante Pacchioni the only time
	Baumel	?	?	1922	Self-nomination
	Rudolf Magnus (Note: "Work on the nervous system and in the area of the mechanics of the intestines")	2 September 1873 Brunswick, Duchy of Brunswick, German Empire	25 July 1927 Pontresina, France	1922, 1923, 1924, 1925, 1926, 1927	
	Constantin Levaditi (Note: "Work on the virus of poliomyelitis, influenza and sleeping-sickness")	1 August 1874 Galați, Romania, Ottoman Empire	5 September 1953 Paris, France	1922, 1924, 1927, 1930, 1931, 1932, 1933, 1934, 1935, 1938, 1939	
	Cécile Vogt-Mugnier	27 March 1875 Annecy, France	4 May 1962 Cambridge, England	1922, 1923, 1926, 1928, 1929, 1930, 1950, 1951, 1953, 1956	Nominated jointly (Note: "Work on the architectonics of the cerebral cortex, cortex localization and on the function of corpus striatum") with Osk.Vogt only
1923
	Archibald Hill (Note: "Work on production of heat in the muscle contraction")	26 September 1886 Bristol, England	3 June 1977 Cambridge, England	1923	(Note: "for his discovery relating to the production of heat in the muscle") Shared the 1922 Nobel Prize in Physiology or Medicine a year later (Note: "for his discovery of the fixed relationship between the consumption of oxygen and the metabolism of lactic acid in the muscle")
	Otto Fritz Meyerhof (Note: "Work on energy turnover in the muscle")	12 April 1884 Hanover, Kingdom of Prussia, German Empire	6 October 1951 Philadelphia, Pennsylvania, United States	1923	Shared the 1922 Nobel Prize in Physiology or Medicine a year later
	John James Rickard Macleod (Note: "Investigations on metabolism and especially the discovery of insulin")	6 September 1876 Clunie, Perthshire, Scotland	16 March 1935 Aberdeen, Scotland	1923, 1924	Shared the 1923 Nobel Prize in Physiology or Medicine (Note: "for the discovery of insulin")
	Frederick Banting (Note: "The discovery of insulin")	14 November 1891 Alliston, Canada	21 February 1941 near Musgrave Harbour, Dominion of Newfoundland	1923, 1924	Shared the 1923 Nobel Prize in Physiology or Medicine
	Frederick Gowland Hopkins (Note: "Work on the nutritional importance of certain amino acids and accessory food substances (vitamins) and on the respiratory processes in muscle")	20 June 1861 Eastbourne, England	16 May 1947 Cambridge, England	1922, 1923, 1924, 1925, 1926, 1927, 1928, 1929	Shared the 1929 Nobel Prize in Physiology or Medicine (Note: "for his discovery of the growth-stimulating vitamins") with Chr.Eijkman and nominated for the Nobel Prize in Chemistry too
	Otto Heinrich Warburg (Note: "Work on the general energetics of life phenomena")	8 October 1883 Freiburg im Breisgau, Grand Duchy of Baden, German Empire	1 August 1970 West Berlin, Germany	1923, 1924, 1925, 1926, 1927, 1928, 1929, 1930, 1931, 1932, 1944, 1955	Won the 1931 Nobel Prize in Physiology or Medicine (Note: "for his discovery of the nature and mode of action of the respiratory enzyme") and nominated for the Nobel Prize in Chemistry too
	Giuliano Vanghetti (Note: "Work on the science of prosthesis")	8 October 1861 Greve, Kingdom of Italy	4 May 1940 Empoli, Kingdom of Italy	1920, 1923	Nominated by Albr.J.Th.Bethe the only time
	Georg Matthias Martin Josef Sticker (Note: "Work on the history of epidemics")	18 April 1860 Cologne, Kingdom of Prussia, German Confederation	28 August 1960 Zell am Main, Germany	1923	Nominated by K.Sudhoff the only time
	Friedrich Dessauer (Note: "The introduction of deep X-ray therapy")	19 July 1881 Aschaffenburg, German Empire	16 February 1963 Frankfurt am Main, Germany	1923	Nominated for the Nobel Prize in Physics too
	Maud Slye (Note: "Work on cancer")	8 February 1879 Minneapolis, Minnesota, United States	17 September 1954 Chicago, Illinois, United States	1923	Nominated by Albert Soiland (1873–1946) the only time
	Ludwig Alfred Seitz (Note: "work and research on the radiotherapy of cancer and sarcoma")	24 May 1872 Pfaffenhofen an der Roth, German Empire	19 June 1961 Pfaffenhofen an der Roth, Germany	1923	Nominated by P.A.Suarez from Quito the only time
	Hermann Ludwig Wintz (Note: "for chemotherapy of carcinomas of the mammary glands and uterus")	12 August 1887 Speyer, German Empire	11 June 1947 Zusmarshausen, Germany	1923, 1928	
	Paul Flechsig (Note: "Investigations on the neural conduction paths in the brain and spinal cord")	29 June 1847 Zwickau, Kingdom of Saxony, German Confederation	22 July 1929 Leipzig, Weimar Germany	1923, 1924	
	Julius Morgenroth (Note: "Work on immunity and chemotherapy")	19 October 1871 Bamberg, German Empire	20 December 1924 Berlin, Weimar Germany	1923, 1924	
	Anatole Chauffard (Note: "Work on the pathological physiology of the liver")	22 August 1855 Avignon, France	1 November 1932 Paris, France	1923, 1924	
	Hans Sachs (Note: "Work on serum diagnosis in syphilis, protein differentiation and anaphylaxis")	6 June 1877 Kattowitz, Kingdom of Prussia, German Empire	25 March 1945 Dublin, Republic of Ireland	1923, 1926	
	Adrianus Paulus Hubertus Antonius de Kleyn (Note: "Work on the physiology of the vestibular apparatus")	14 October 1883 Ameide, Netherlands	11 May 1949 Amsterdam, Netherlands	1923, 1926, 1927, 1929	
	Philippe Antoine Lasseur (Note: "Discovery of the laws of antibody reactions")	27 June 1882 Courçais, France	10 January 1946 Nancy(?), France	1923, 1930	Nominated by J.P.Vuillemin only
	Rudolf Höber (Note: "The introduction of a physical chemical view in medicine")	27 December 1873 Stettin, German Empire	5 September 1953 Philadelphia, United States	1923, 1929, 1931	
	Gustav Embden (Note: "Work on the chemical course of events in muscle at rest and in action")	10 November 1874 Hamburg, German Empire	25 July 1933 Nassau, Nazi Germany	1923, 1924, 1927, 1929, 1930, 1932, 1933	Nominated for the Nobel Prize in Chemistry too
	Wilhelm Kolle (Note: "Vaccination against typhus and cholera")	2 November 1868 Lerbach, Osterode am Harz, Kingdom of Prussia, North German Confederation	10 May 1935 Berlin, Nazi Germany	1923, 1930, 1934	
	Jakob Johann von Uexküll (Note: "The works "Theoretische Biologie" and "Umwelt und Innenwelt der Tiere", and work on tonus and reflexes")	8 September 1864 Keblas Manor, Sankt Michaelis, Wiek County, Governorate of Estonia, Russian Empire	25 July 1944 Capri, Kingdom of Italy	1923, 1926, 1929, 1936, 1937	
	Leonor Michaelis (Note: "Work on physical chemical conceptions in physiology")	16 January 1875 Berlin, German Empire	8 October 1949 New York, United States	1923, 1924, 1926, 1929, 1930, 1931, 1949	
1924
	Hans Spemann (Note: "Work on the physiology of embryonic development")	27 June 1869 Stuttgart, Kingdom of Württemberg	9 September 1941 near Freiburg, Nazi Germany	1924, 1925, 1926, 1932, 1933, 1934, 1935, 1936	Won the 1935 Nobel Prize in Physiology or Medicine (Note: "for his discovery of the organizer effect in embryonic development")
	Victor Babeș (Note: "Work on the pathological anatomy, symptomatology, prophylaxis and treatment of pellagra")	28 July 1854 Vienna, Austrian Empire	19 October 1926 Bucharest, Romania	1914, 1924	
	Friedrich Martius (Note: "The foundation of clinical constitutional research")	7 September 1850 Erxleben, Börde, Kingdom of Prussia, German Confederation	1 October 1923 Rostock, Weimar Germany	1924	Nominated posthumously by H.Curschmann the only time
	Thomas Ionnesco (Note: "Work on the anatomy, physiology and surgery of the neck and chest sympathicus")	13 September 1860 Ploiești, Romania, Ottoman Empire	28 March 1926 Bucharest, Romania	1924	
	Ernst Freund (Note: "Work on specific characteristics in the metabolism of cancer patients")	15 December 1863 Vienna, Austrian Empire	2 June 1946 London, England	1924	Nominated by D.R.Werner the only time
	Hermann Philipp Rudolf Stieve (Note: "Research on sex gland tissue")	22 May 1886 Munich, Kingdom of Bavaria	6 September 1952 West Berlin, Germany	1924	Nominated by W.Lubosch the only time
	Arturo Donaggio (Note: "Work on the structure of the nerve cell")	11 October 1868 Falconara Marittima, Kingdom of Italy	8 October 1942 Bologna, Kingdom of Italy	1924, 1925	
	Friedrich Karl Kleine (Note: "Work on the control of tropical sleeping-sickness")	14 May 1869 Stralsund, Kingdom of Prussia, North German Confederation	22 March 1951 Johannesburg, Union of South Africa	1911, 1924, 1926	
	Martin Heidenhain (Note: "Contribution to the theory of, and microscopical examination methods; Work on new dyeing methods and above all work on synthesiology")	7 December 1864 Breslau, Kingdom of Prussia, German Confederation	14 December 1949 Tübingen, Germany	1924, 1930	
	David Marine (Note: "Work on the prevention of simple goitre upon a large scale")	20 September 1880 Whiteleysburg, Maryland, United States	6 November 1976 Lewes, Delaware, United States	1924, 1925, 1931, 1932	
	Otto Folin (Note: "Work on urine and blood analysis")	4 April 1867 Åseda, Småland, Sweden	25 October 1934 Boston, United States	1920, 1924, 1925, 1927, 1931, 1932	
	Félix d'Hérelle (Note: "The discovery of the bacteriophage")	25 April 1873 Paris, France	22 February 1949 Paris, France	1924, 1925, 1926, 1929, 1930, 1931, 1932, 1933, 1934, 1937	
	Thomas Lewis (Note: "Work on fibrillation and flutter of the auricles")	26 December 1881 Taffs Well, Cardiff, Wales	17 March 1945 Loudwater, Hertfordshire, England	1924, 1931, 1934, 1935, 1936, 1940	
	Herbert McLean Evans (Note: "The work "On the Relations Between Fertility and Nutrition"")	23 September 1882 Modesto, California, United States	6 March 1971 Berkeley, California, United States	1924, 1933, 1934, 1935, 1936, 1937, 1938, 1939, 1940, 1942, 1944, 1946, 1949, 1950, 1952, 1953	
	Donald Van Slyke (Note: "Work on electrolytic balance in the blood")	29 March 1883 Pike, New York, United States	4 May 1971 Brookhaven, New York, United States	1924, 1929, 1936, 1937, 1946, 1947, 1948, 1953, 1954	Nominated for the Nobel Prize in Chemistry too
1925
	Julius Wagner-Jauregg (Note: "Work on the physiology of embryonic development")	7 March 1857 Wels, Austrian Empire	27 September 1940 Vienna, Nazi Germany	1925, 1926, 1927, 1928	Won the 1927 Nobel Prize in Physiology or Medicine (Note: "for his discovery of the therapeutic value of malaria inoculation in the treatment of dementia paralytica")
	Maurice Crowther Hall (Note: "Discovery of the use of carbon tetrachloride to remove hook worms")	15 July 1881 Golden, Colorado, United States	1 May 1938	1925	
	John Irvine Hunter (Note: "Experimental investigations upon the double function of voluntary muscle and their nervous control")	24 January 1898 Bendigo, Australia	10 December 1924 London, England	1925	Nominated posthumously
	Sigmund Fraenkel (Note: "Work on placental and ovarian hormones, characterization of lipoids and on the structure of albumins")	22 May 1868 Krakau, Galicia, Austria-Hungary	7 June 1939 Geneva, Switzerland	1925	Nominated with E.Gley by Domenico Lo Monaco (31.7.1863 Bagheria - 19.4.1930 Rome) the only time
	Peter Rona (Rosenfeld) (Note: "Effects of poisons on fermentation; ion concentrations in biological systems")	13 May 1871 Budapest, Arch-Kingdom of Hungary	February or March 1945 Auschwitz concentration camp, Nazi Germany	1925	Nominated with C.A.Neuberg and S. P. L. Sørensen by Ad.Bickel the only time
	John Weston Nuzum (Note: "Isolation from human breast cancers of a micrococcus, proposed as being the cause of cancer")	16 June 1890 Brodhead, Wisconsin, United States	1953 Illinois, United States	1925	Nominated by Albert John Ochsner (1858–1925) the only time
	Otto Naegeli (Note: "Work on blood")	9 July 1871 Ermatingen, Switzerland	11 March 1938 Zurich, Switzerland	1925	Nominated by Arthur William Meyer (1873–1966) the only time
	C. U. Ariëns Kappers (Note: "Work on the anatomy of the nervous system")	9 August 1877 Groningen, Netherlands	28 July 1946 Amsterdam, Netherlands	1925	Nominated by Arthur William Meyer (1873–1966) the only time
	Paul Otto Max Frosch (Note: "Visualization of the hoof and mouth disease virus, with the aid of ultraviolet light")	15 August 1860 Jüterbog, Kingdom of Prussia, German Confederation	2 June 1928 Berlin, Weimar Germany	1925	Nominated by R.du Bois-Reymond the only time
	Holger Christian Møllgaard (Note: "Discovery of sanocrysin, a gold compound for the treatment of tuberculosis")	20 May 1885	30 December 1928	1925	Nominated by John Grönberg the only time
	Oscar-Jean Rapin (Note: "Method of direct injection of oxygen into the circulatory system; anesthesia; work on incontinentia urinae")	5 February 1878 Lausanne, Switzerland	24 October 1946	1925	Nominated by Rodolphe Mellet (22.7.1877 Lausanne - 27.2.1955) the only time
	Daniel Abraham Otto Hermann Braus (Note: "for modern methods in comparative and experimental human anatomy, as in his book "Human Anatomy" ("Anatomie des Menschen")")	15 August 1868 Burtscheid, Kingdom of Prussia, North German Confederation	28 November 1924 Würzburg, Weimar Germany	1925	Nominated posthumously by Curt Elze the only time
	Georges Henri Roger (Note: " for work on the metabolism of fatty acids, and studies of the effects of respiration on these substances")	4 June 1860 Paris, France	19 April 1946 Saint-Leu-la-Forêt, France	1925	
	Robert Henry Elliot	23 August 1864	9 November 1936 Chipping Barnet, London, England	1925	Nominated jointly (Note: "Surgical treatment of glaucoma")
	Pierre-Félix Lagrange	22 January 1857 Soumensac, France	22 April 1928 Paris, France	1925	Nominated jointly
	Hjalmar August Schiøtz	9 February 1850 Stavanger, Norway	8 December 1927 Oslo, Norway	1925, 1926	Nominated jointly
	Søren Holth	21 July 1863 Nes, Viken, Norway	23 September 1937 Vestre Aker, Norway	1925, 1926	Nominated jointly
	Johan August Harald Hammar (Note: "Distribution of lipoids in the human adrenal cortex")	21 August 1861 Karlskrona, Sweden	17 April 1946 Uppsala, Sweden	1925, 1927, 1928, 1930	
	Lawrence Joseph Henderson (Note: "Work on the acid base balance of the blood")	3 June 1878 Lynn, Massachusetts, United States	10 February 1942 Cambridge, Massachusetts, United States	1925, 1928, 1932	
	George Frederick Dick (Note: "Discovery of the scarlet fever virus. Development of a skin test for determining the susceptibility of individuals to scarlet fever.")	21 July 1881 Ft. Wayne, Indiana, United States	10 October 1967 Palo Alto, California, United States	1925, 1926, 1927, 1928, 1935, 1936, 1945	Nominated jointly (Note: "Work on the etiology, prevention and cure of scarlet fever")
	Gladys Dick	18 December 1881 Pawnee City, Nebraska, United States	21 August 1963 Palo Alto, California, United States	1925, 1926, 1927, 1928, 1935, 1936, 1945	Nominated jointly
	Yamagiwa Katsusaburō (Note: "Work on epithelial tumors")	23 February 1863 Ueda, Nagano, Japan	2 March 1930 Tokyo, Japan	1924, 1925, 1926, 1927, 1928, 1930, 1936	
	Béla Schick (Note: "Work on serum disease, and on the prevention of diphtheria")	16 July 1877 Balatonboglár, Arch-Kingdom of Hungary	6 December 1967 New York, United States	1925, 1936	
	Pierre Nolf (Note: "Work on blood coagulation")	26 July 1873 Ypres, Belgium	14 September 1953 Brussels, Belgium	1925, 1930, 1937, 1938, 1939, 1942	
	John Jacob Abel (Note: "Studies of the endocrine glands, and isolation of epinephrine")	19 May 1857 Cleveland, Ohio, United States	26 May 1938 Baltimore, Maryland, United States	1925, 1927, 1928, 1930, 1931, 1932, 1934, 1939	Nominated for the Nobel Prize in Chemistry too
	Adolf Bickel (Note: "Studies of hypovitaminosis, especially in the work "Das Wesen der Avitaminose"")	19 March 1875 Wiesbaden, Kingdom of Prussia, North German Confederation	21 January 1946 Wangen, Germany	1925, 1940	
	Filippo Bottazzi (Note: "Role of the sarcoplasm in muscle contraction. Osmotic pressure regulation by marine animals")	23 December 1867 Diso, Kingdom of Italy	19 September 1941 Diso, Kingdom of Italy	1925, 1932, 1938, 1941	
	Alphonse Dochez (Note: "Work on the etiology, prevention and cure of scarlet fever")	21 April 1882 San Francisco, United States	30 June 1964 New York, United States	1925, 1926, 1927, 1928, 1938, 1948	
	Louis Lapicque (Note: "Work on chronaxy")	1 August 1866 Épinal, France	December б, 1952 Paris, France	1925, 1928, 1929, 1930, 1931, 1933, 1934, 1935, 1936, 1937, 1938, 1939, 1943, 1944, 1946, 1950, 1951	
1926
	Francis Peyton Rous (Note: "Showed that malignant tumors could be caused by a filterable agent")	5 October 1879 Baltimore, Maryland, United States	16 February 1970 New York, United States	1926, 1931, 1934, 1935, 1936, 1937, 1939, 1942, 1946, 1947, 1951, 1955	Shared the 1966 Nobel Prize in Physiology or Medicine (Note: "for his discovery of tumour-inducing viruses") with Ch.Br.Huggins
	Pierre Delbet (Note: "Treatment of battle injuries and fractures")	15 November 1861 La Ferté-Gaucher, France	17 July 1957 La Ferté-Gaucher, France	1922, 1926	Nominated by G.Phocas only
	William Ewart Gye (Note: "Work on cancer")	11 August 1884 Breaston, England	14 October 1952 Perth(?), Australia	1926	
	Joseph Edwin Barnard	7 December 1870	25 October 1949	1926	
	David Hermann Wieland	26 February 1885 Pforzheim, German Empire	7 May 1929 Heidelberg, Weimar Germany	1926	Nominated jointly (Note: "Work on acetylene anesthesia") with J.Barcroft by P.Hoffmann the only time
	Carl Joseph Gauß	Oktober 29, 1875 Rittergut Lohne bei Isernhagen, German Empire	11 February 1957 Bad Kissingen, Germany	1926	Nominated jointly with J.Barcroft by P.Hoffmann the only time
	Gerrit Grijns (Note: "Foundation of the field of vitamin research, especially through the introduction of the term "partial hunger"")	28 May 1865 Leerdam, Netherlands	11 November 1944 Utrecht, Netherlands	1926, 1927, 1942	
	Arno Erich Benedict Luckhardt (Note: "Use of ethylene as an anesthetic")	26 August 1885 Chicago, United States	1957	1926, 1928	
	Constantin von Economo (Note: "Work on encephalitis lethargica")	21 August 1876 Brăila, Romania, Ottoman Empire	21 October 1931 Vienna, Austria	1926, 1930, 1932	
	Emmanuel Hédon (Note: "Work on endocrine secretion of the pancreas and on blood transfusion")	30 April 1863 Burie, France	8 March 1933 Montpellier, France	1926, 1932	
	Otfrid Foerster (Note: "Operative treatment of spinal and neurological conditions to reduce suffering")	9 November 1873 Breslau, Kingdom of Prussia, North German Confederation	15 June 1941 Breslau, Nazi Germany	1926, 1927, 1930, 1931, 1933, 1934, 1937, 1938	
	Henry Hallett Dale (Note: "Work on adrenelin, ergotamine and histamine. Studies of the capillary system")	9 June 1875 Islington, London, England	23 July 1968 Cambridge, Cambridgeshire, England	1926, 1930, 1931, 1934, 1935, 1936, 1937	Shared the 1936 Nobel Prize in Physiology or Medicine (Note: "for their discoveries relating to chemical transmission of nerve impulses")
1927					Shared the 1936 Nobel Prize in Physiology or Medicine
	Otto Loewi (Note: "Discovery of an hormonal system controlling action of the heart")	3 June 1873 Frankfurt am Main, German Empire	25 December 1961 New York, United States	1927, 1928, 1929, 1932, 1933, 1935, 1936, 1937	Shared the 1936 Nobel Prize in Physiology or Medicine
	Wilhelm Röhl (Note: "Discovery and preparation of Germanin (Bayer 205), an antitrypanosomal agent, and plasmoquinine, for treatment of malaria")	16 April 1881 Berlin, German Empire	3 March 1929 Wuppertal-Elberfeld, Weimar Germany	1927	Nominated by Arthur E. Weber the only time
	Peter Mühlens (Note: "Use of Germanin against tropical sleeping sickness, and use of yatren against amebic dysentery")	12 May 1874 Bonn, German Empire	7 June 1943 Hamburg, Nazi Germany	1927	Nominated by K.P.Schmidt the only time
	Frederick George Novy (Note: "Work in the field of anaphylaxis and anaphylatoxin, and research on cellular respiration as applied to bacteria")	9 December 1864 Chicago, United States	8 August 1957 Ann Arbor, Michigan, United States	1927	
	Ludwig Haberlandt (Note: "Hormonal control of the heart muscle, especially in his work "Das Hormon der Herzbewegung" (Verlag Urban u. Schwarzenberg, Vienna 1927)")	1 February 1885 Graz, Austria-Hungary	22 July 1932 Innsbruck, Austria	1927	
	Édouard Laguesse (Note: "Endocrine function of the islets of Langerhans")	23 April 1861 Dijon, France	6 November 1927 Dijon, France	1927, 1928	
	Vincenzo Diamare (Note: "Identification of the islets of Langerhans, and their subsequent importance in carbohydrate metabolism and the discovery of insulin")	3 April 1871 Naples, Kingdom of Italy	20 January 1966 Naples, Italy	1927, 1928	
	Ettore Marchiafava (Note: "Work on the etiology and pathogenesis of malaria")	3 January 1847 Rome, Papal States	22 October 1935 Rome, Kingdom of Italy	1902, 1927, 1932	
	Ralph Stayner Lillie (Note: "Work on "Protoplasmic transmission"")	8 August 1875 Toronto, Canada	19 March 1952 Chicago, United States	1927, 1935	Nominated by Robert Albert Gesell (23.6.1886 Alma, Wis. - 19.4.1954 Ann Arbor) only
	Ángel Roffo (Note: "Work on cancer")	30 December 1882 Buenos Aires, Argentina	23 July 1947 Buenos Aires, Argentina	1927, 1937, 1940	
	Paul Albert Ancel	21 September 1873 Nancy, France	27 January 1961 Paris, France	1927, 1937, 1940, 1941, 1942, 1948	Nominated jointly (Note: "Localization of the production of male sex hormone to the interstitial gland of the testes, and of an ovarian hormone to the corpus luteum") with P.Bouin only
	Pol Bouin (Note: "Discovery of the histo-physiology of the ovary")	11 June 1870 Vendresse, France	5 February 1962 Vendresse, France	1927, 1937, 1939, 1940, 1941, 1942, 1948, 1949	
	Antoine Henri André Thomas (Note: "Work on the physiology and pathology of the sympathetic nervous system")	19 November 1867 Paris, France	21 July 1963 Paris, France	1927, 1949	
	Franz Volhard (Note: "Work on the pathogenesis, classification and therapy of kidney diseases")	2 May 1872 Munich, Kingdom of Bavaria	24 May 1950 Frankfurt am Main, Germany	1927, 1934, 1950	
1928
	António Egas Moniz (Note: "Work on encephalography on arteries and veins; studies of bloodflow through the carotis artery")	29 November 1874 Avanca, Portugal	13 December 1955 Lisbon, Portugal	1928, 1933, 1937, 1944, 1949, 1950	Shared the 1949 Nobel Prize in Physiology or Medicine (Note: "for his discovery of the therapeutic value of leucotomy in certain psychoses") with W.R.Hess
	Heinrich Otto Wieland (Note: "Studies of the metabolic processes in the cell")	4 June 1877 Pforzheim, German Empire	5 August 1957 Starnberg, Germany	1928	Won the 1927 Nobel Prize in Chemistry one year later (Note: "for his investigations of the constitution of the bile acids and related substances")
	Adolf Windaus (Note: "Work on the chemical nature of the antirachitic vitamin")	25 December 1876 Berlin, German Empire	9 June 1959 Göttingen, Germany	1928	Won the 1928 Nobel Prize in Chemistry (Note: "for the services rendered through his research into the constitution of the sterols and their connection with the vitamins")
	Paul Grawitz (Note: "General theory of inflammation ("induktiv aufgebaute Entzündungstheorie")")	1 October 1850 Zerrin, Pomerania, German Confederation	27 June 1932 Greifswald, Germany	1928	Self-nomination
	Gustave Rappin (Note: "Developed a vaccine against tuberculosis (BCG), now in general use")	1851	1942	1928	Nominated jointly with L.Ch.Alb.Calmette by René Verhoogen (1867–1947) the only time
	Pavel Grigorjevich Rosanov (Note: "Epidemiology of plague and cholera")	1853	after 1934	1928	Nominated by his son L.P.Rosanov the only time
	Giulio Tarozzi (Note: "Work on actinomycosis, encephalitis and on anaerobiosis in bacteria")	27 January 1868 Turin, Kingdom of Italy	1948 Bologna, Italy	1928	Nominated by Eugenio Centanni the only time
	Victor Pachon (Note: "Determination of the minimal (diastolic) blood pressure, anticoagulatory effect of the liver, role of calcium in heart function, extirpation of the stomach and studies of stomach surgery, and studies of heart function")	26 May 1867 Clermont-Ferrand, France	1938 Meyzieu, France	1928	
	Marius Tscherning (Note: "Research concerning color vision and the mechanism of accommodation")	11 December 1854 Østrup near Odense, Denmark	1 September 1939	1928	Nominated by William Henry Luedde (13.8.1876 Warsaw, Illinois - 19.8.1952 Richmond Heights, Missouri) the only time
	W. Easson Brown (Note: "Use of ethylene as an anesthetic")	1894	1957	1928	Nominated jointly with A.Er.B.Luckhardt by H.Wieland the only time
	Adalbert Czerny (Note: "Work on the dietary requirements of children, especially infants. Realization that improper diet in itself may cause disease")	25 March 1863 Jaworzno, Galicia, Austria-Hungary	3 October 1941 Berlin, Nazi Germany	1928, 1931	
	Carlos R. Lavalle (Note: "for work on the treatment of tuberculosis")	1878	?	1928	Nominated by Fortunato Quesada Larrea (5.3.1895 Trujillo, Peru - 1966 Lima) from Lima the only time
	Rudolph Matas (Note: " for the development of the operation of endoaneurysmorrhaphy")	12 September 1860 St. Charles Parish, Louisiana, United States	23 September 1957 New Orleans, United States	1928	Nominated by Edward Lacy King (1.10.1884 Mound, Louisiana - 30.5.1963 New Orleans) from New Orleans the only time
	B. Stroganoff (Note: "for the treatment of eclampsia by conservative lines")	10 January 1858 Vyazma, Russian Empire	24 September 1938 Leningrad, Russia	1928	Nominated by Edward Lacy King (1.10.1884 Mound, Louisiana - 30.5.1963 New Orleans) from New Orleans the only time
	Mariano Luigi Patrizi (Note: "Work on the relationship between muscular fatigue and changes in the rate of heart beat and respiration; direct measurement of cerebral fatigue")	23 September 1866 Recanati, Kingdom of Italy	9 September 1935 Bologna, Kingdom of Italy	1928, 1930	
	Alfred Fabian Hess (Note: "Work on UV-radiation and the anti rickets effect of certain substances")	9 October 1875 New York, United States	5 December 1933 New York, United States	1928, 1929, 1931, 1932	Nominated for the Nobel Prize in Chemistry too
	Claudius Regaud (Note: "Work on the biological effects of radiation, especially in the treatment of cancer")	30 January 1870 Lyon, France	29 December 1940 Couzon-au-Mont-d'Or, Vichy France	1928, 1936, 1937	
	Otto Frank (Note: "Work on registration methods, acoustics (especially wave theory) and the function theory of the auditory ossicles")	21 June 1865 Groß-Umstadt, Grand Duchy of Hesse, German Confederation	12 November 1944 Munich, Nazi Germany	1928, 1929, 1930, 1931, 1937	
	Genichi Kato (Note: "Investigations in the field of nerve-muscle physiology; established a new theory of decrementless conduction of nerve impulses")	11 February 1890 Niimi, Japan	1 May 1979	1928, 1935, 1937, 1944	
	Eugenio Centanni (Note: "Work on protein therapy ("la Troisième Immunité") and polyvalent vaccination")	8 January 1863 Montotto, Kingdom of Italy	8 August 1942 Bologna, Kingdom of Italy	1928, 1938	
	Yandell Henderson (Note: "Studies of the symptoms and mechanism of acapnia; use of carbon dioxide to irritate the breathing centra")	23 April 1873 Louisville, Kentucky, United States	18 February 1944 La Jolla, United States	1928, 1929, 1936, 1937, 1938, 1939	
	Mansfeld Géza (Note: "Relationship between exocrine and endocrine secretion in the pancreas")	26 February 1882 Budapest, Arch-Kingdom of Hungary	11 January 1950 Geneva, Switzerland	1928, 1940	
	Torsten Thunberg (Note: "Work on oxidative processes in tissue, and in general in intact organisms")	30 June 1873 Torsåker, Sweden	4 December 1952 Lund, Sweden	1928, 1929, 1932, 1937, 1938, 1939, 1940, 1941, 1950	
	Sherwood Moore	28 October 1880 Lynchburg, Virginia, United States	9 July 1963	1928	Nominated jointly (Note: "Invention of the method of cholecystography and for their contribution to the surgery and pathology of the biliary apparatus") by Robert James Terry (24.1.1871 St. Louis - 1966) the only time
	Glover Hancock Copher	1893	1970	1928	Nominated jointly by Robert James Terry (24.1.1871 St. Louis - 1966) the only time
	Ludvig Hektoen (Note: "Outstanding discoveries in immunology and especially for his brilliant studies on precipitins")	2 July 1863 Westby, Wisconsin, United States	5 July 1951 Chicago, Illinois, United States	1928	Nominated with Ant.J.Carlson by Leslie Brainerd Arey (1891 Camden - 23.3.1988 Chicago) the only time
	Anton Julius Carlson (Note: "Many fundamental contributions to the science of gastro-enterology")	29 January 1875 Munkedal, Sweden	2 September 1956 Chicago, Illinois, United States	1928, 1953	
	George Barger (Note: "The synthesis of thyroxine")	4 April 1878 Manchester, England	5 January 1939 Aeschi, Switzerland	1928	Nominated jointly with Ch.R.Harington only including for the Nobel Prize in Chemistry too
	Charles Robert Harington (Note: "The synthesis of thyroxin and proof of its chemical structure")	1 August 1897 Llanerfyl, Wales	4 February 1972 Mill Hill, London, England	1928, 1931, 1934, 1947, 1953	Nominated for the Nobel Prize in Chemistry too
	Warren Henry Cole (Note: "Discovery of visualization of the gallbladder")	24 July 1898 Clay Center, Kansas, United States	25 May 1990	1928, 1939	Nominated with Ev.Ambr.Graham only
	Evarts Ambrose Graham (Note: "The discovery that by the administration of a dye (phenoltetraiodophthalein) preferably intravenously, the Gall Bladder may be visualized when X-ray photography is used")	19 March 1883 Chicago, Illinois, United States	4 March 1957 St. Louis, Missouri, United States	1928, 1932, 1939, 1951, 1954	
	Camille Guérin (Note: "Discovery of a vaccine against tuberculosis (BCG) with Guérin; sera against snake venom")	22 December 1872 Poitiers, France	9 June 1961 Paris, France	1928, 1930, 1932, 1950, 1954, 1955	
	James Collip (Note: "The preparation of the active hormone of the parathyroid gland and demonstration of its mode of action and uses")	20 November 1892 Belleville, Ontario, Canada	19 June 1965 London, Ontario, Canada	1928, 1931, 1935, 1936, 1944, 1951, 1955, 1956	
	George Minot (Note: "Discovered that eating liver will remove the clinical manifestations of pernicious anemia")	2 December 1885 Boston, United States	25 February 1950 Brookline, Massachusetts, United States	1928, 1929, 1930, 1931, 1932, 1933, 1934, 1935	Shared the 1934 Nobel Prize in Physiology or Medicine (Note: "for their discoveries concerning liver therapy in cases of anaemia")
1929					Shared the 1934 Nobel Prize in Physiology or Medicine
	George Whipple (Note: "Discovered increased regeneration of blood in anemic animals when they were fed liver")	28 August 1878 Ashland, New Hampshire, United States	1 February 1976 Rochester, New York, United States	1929, 1930, 1931, 1932, 1933, 1934, 1935	Shared the 1934 Nobel Prize in Physiology or Medicine
	William P. Murphy (Note: "Work on the treatment of pernicious anemia by means of a diet rich in liver")	6 February 1892 Stoughton, Wisconsin, United States	9 October 1987 Brookline, Massachusetts, United States	1929, 1930, 1931, 1932, 1933, 1934, 1935	Shared the 1934 Nobel Prize in Physiology or Medicine
	Hans Fischer (Note: "Work on porphyrins; synthesis of hemin")	27 July 1881 Höchst am Main, German Empire	31 March 1945 Munich, Nazi Germany	1929, 1930	Won the 1930 Nobel Prize in Chemistry (Note: "for his researches into the constitution of haemin and chlorophyll and especially for his synthesis of haemin")
	Dennis Gabor	5 June 1900 Budapest, Arch-Kingdom of Hungary	9 February 1979 London, England	1929	Won the 1971 Nobel Prize in Physics (Note: "for his invention and development of the holographic method")
	Tibor (Tiberius) Reiter	?	?	1929	Nominated jointly (Note: "Effects of radiation on cell division ("Zellteilung und Strahlung", Jul. Springer Verlag, Berlin, 1928.)") with D.Gabor by Albr.J.Th.Bethe the only time
	Max Heinrich Fischer	25 May 1892 Gablonz an der Neiße, Austria-Hungary	28 November 1971 Schwarzach im Pongau, Austria	1929	Nominated jointly (Note: "Studies of posture, reflexes and muscle tonus in humans") with Adr.P.H.A. de Kleyn by Albr.J.Th.Bethe the only time
	Lafayette Mendel (Note: "Work on vitamins; experiments with rats")	5 February 1872 Delhi, New York, United States	9 December 1935 New Haven, Connecticut, United States	1922, 1929	
	Otto Schöbl (Note: "Experimental work with frambosia which led to knowledge of the etiology and pathogenesis of treponematous infections")	27 August 1877 Zditz, Austria-Hungary	13 October 1938 Tokyo, Japan	1929	
	Kurt Huldschinsky	24 November 1883 Gleiwitz, German Empire	31 October 1940 Alexandria, Egypt	1929	Nominated jointly (Note: "Work on the chemical nature of the antirachitic vitamin; the discovery that food irradiated with ultraviolet rays produced this vitamin") with Alfr.F.Hess by H.von Mettenheim the only time. H.Steenbock nominated for the Nobel Prize in Chemistry too
	Harry Steenbock	16 August 1886 Charlestown, Wisconsin, United States	25 December 1967 Madison, Wisconsin, United States	1929	Nominated jointly with Alfr.F.Hess by H.von Mettenheim the only time. H.Steenbock nominated for the Nobel Prize in Chemistry too
	Proceso Gabriel (Note: "Contributions to the public health and the sanitary progress of the Philippines")	2 July 1887 Santa Ana, Manila, Philippines	4 November 1935 Manila, Philippine Commonwealth	1929	Nominated by Dario del Val the only time
	Friedrich Kraus (Note: "Developed the theory of "zyzytiology". Studies of the importance of electrolytes in heart disease")	31 May 1858 Bodenbach, Austria-Hungary	1 March 1936 Berlin, Nazi Germany	1929	
	Thomas Burr Osborne (Note: "Methods for isolating, purifying and reducing proteins into their constituent amino acids. Work on preparing chemically standardized diets, and analyzing the effects of diets having certain vitamin deficiencies when fed to rats")	5 August 1859 New Haven, United States	29 January 1929 New Haven, United States	1929	Died before the only chance to be rewarded
	Paul Trendelenburg (Note: "Work on adrenalin and pituitrin")	24 March 1884 Bonn, German Empire	4 February 1931 Berlin, Weimar Germany	1929	Nominated with Y.Henderson by Mich. I Gramenitzki the only time
	Sergey Pavlovich Kostytschew (Note: "Studies of fermentation, especially ways of changing the ratio of acetaldehyde to alcohol. Also work on nitrogen assimilation through microorganisms and carbon dioxide assimilation in plants")	8 May 1877 Saint Petersburg, Russian Empire	21 August 1931 Alushta, Crimea	1929	Nominated with S.Flexner by G.Belonovski the only time
	Josef Meller (Note: "Work on retrobulbar optic-nerve diseases, herpes iris and sympathetic ophthalmology")	22 October 1874 Stein an der Donau, Austria-Hungary	23 November 1968 Vienna, Austria	1929	Nominated by Alb.Botteri the only time
	Théodore Tuffier (Note: "Work on sacral anesthesia, developed "experimental practical surgery ("création de la chirurgie expérimentale pratique"), organized international conferences for surgeons, and a society for amputees")	26 March 1857 Bellême, France	27 October 1929 Paris, France	1929	Nominated by René-Adrien Donnet the only time
	Carl Correns (Note: "Work on the laws of heredity and sexual determination of higher plants")	19 September 1864 Munich, Kingdom of Bavaria, German Confederation	14 February 1933 Berlin, Weimar Germany	1929, 1930	
	Frederick Twort (Note: "The discovery of the bacteriophage")	22 October 1877 Camberley, England	20 March 1950 Camberley, England	1929, 1930, 1931, 1933, 1934, 1937	
	Pío del Río Hortega (Note: "Work on the histology and histopathology of the nervous system, especially studies of glia tissue (microglia and oligodendroglia)")	5 May 1882 Portillo, Valladolid, Spain	1 June 1945 Buenos Aires, Argentina	1929, 1937	
	Alexander Gurwitsch (Note: "Work on mitogenetic radiation")	26 September 1874 Poltava, Russian Empire	27 July 1954 Moscow, Russia	1929, 1932, 1933, 1934, 1938	Nominated for the Nobel Prize in Physics too
	Robin Fåhræus (Note: "For his work, "The suspension stability of the blood" ("The suspensionstability of the blood", Acta med. Scandinav. Bd. 55 H. 1/2 pp. 1–288)")	15 October 1888 Stockholm, Sweden	18 September 1968 Lund, Sweden	1929, 1930, 1931, 1935, 1940, 1941	
	Upendranath Brahmachari (Note: "Discovered ureastibamine (antimonial compound for treatment of kalaazar) and a new disease, post-kalaazar dermal leishmanoid")	19 December 1873 Sardanga, Purbasthali, Bengal Presidency, British India	6 February 1946	1929, 1942	
	Edwin Joseph Cohn (Note: "Electrophoretic analyses of plasma proteins and immune globulines")	17 December 1892 New York, United States	1 October 1953 Boston, United States	1929, 1946, 1948, 1949, 1950	Nominated for the Nobel Prize in Chemistry too
	Ernst Kretschmer (Note: "Divided populations in two groups based on general body structure: one which is more prone to be afflicted with schizophrenic disorders, and another, more susceptible to mano-depressive disorders")	8 October 1888 Wüstenrot, German Empire	8 February 1964 Tübingen, Germany	1929, 1956	
