= Ancel (name) =

Ancel is both a French surname and a given name. Notable people with the name include:

Surname:

- Paul Albert Ancel (1873–1961), French professor of medicine
- Jacques Ancel (1879–1943), French geographer and geopolitician
- Jean Ancel (1940–2008), Romanian-born Israeli author and historian
- Janet Ancel, American politician
- Michel Ancel (born 1972), French video game designer
- Lauren Ancel Meyers, integrative biologist

Given name:

- Ancel Henry Bassett (1809–1886), American Methodist minister, writer, editor and historian
- Ancel Keys (1904–2004), American scientist
