= Grawitz =

Grawitz is a surname. Notable people with the surname include:

- Ernst Grawitz (hematologist) (1860–1911), German internist
- Ernst-Robert Grawitz (1899–1945), Nazi physician
- Paul Grawitz (1850–1932), physician who identified the Grawitz tumor
  - Grawitz tumor, Renal cell carcinoma
