= Donaggio =

Donaggio is a surname. Notable people with the surname include:

- Arturo Donaggio (1868–1942), Italian physician
- Leonardo Donaggio (born 2003), Italian freestyle skier
- Pino Donaggio (born 1941), Italian musician, singer, and composer
- Gianmarco Donaggio (born 1991). Italian filmmaker and artist.
