= Frederick George Novy =

American bacteriologist

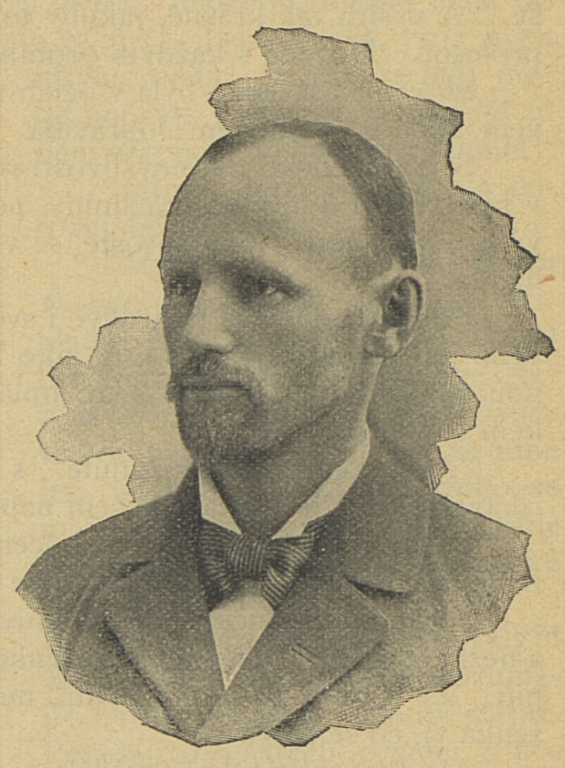
- Illustration, ca. 1903
- Born: December 9, 1864; Chicago, Illinois, U.S.
- Died: August 8, 1957 (aged 92); Ann Arbor, Michigan, U.S.
- Resting place: Forest Hill Cemetery
- Education: Sc.D., M.D.
- Alma mater: University of Michigan
- Occupations: Bacteriologist, chemist, instructor
- Spouse: Grace Olive Garwood
- Children: Robert Lev; Frank Orel; Marguerite F. Frederick George Jr. Frances Louise

Frederick George Novy (December 9, 1864 – August 8, 1957) was an American bacteriologist, organic chemist, and instructor.

== Biography ==
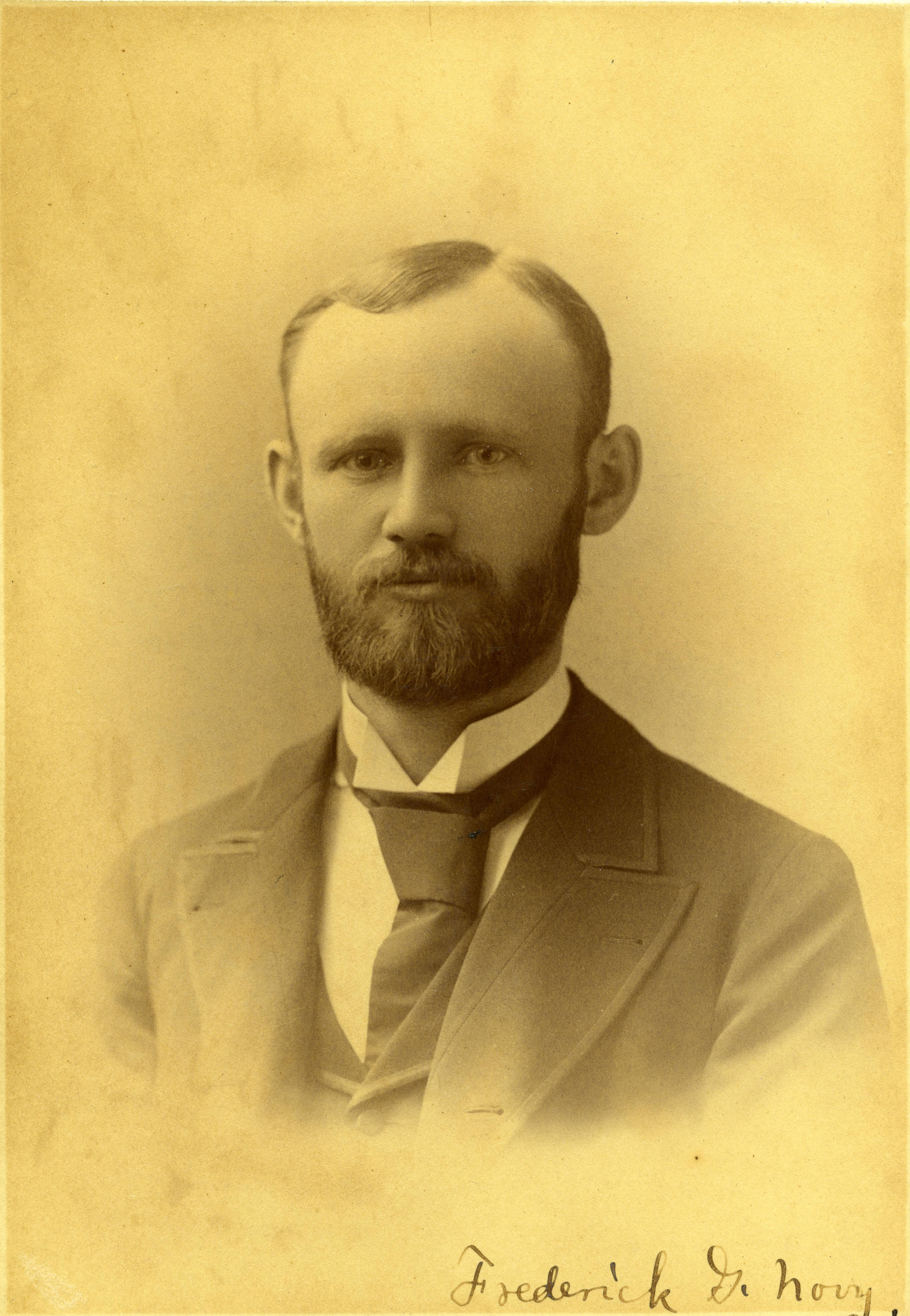
Novy in the 1890s

Born in Chicago, Illinois, the third son of Joseph Novy and his wife Frances, grew up on the West Side, near the site where the Great Chicago Fire started in 1871. After attending the local public schools, Novy matriculated to the University of Michigan where he studied chemistry, graduating with a B.S. in 1886. He performed his graduate studies at the same institution, receiving his master's degree in 1887 with a thesis on "Cocaine and its derivatives". At this time he became an instructor at the University, teaching a course in bacteriology, then was awarded an Sc.D. in 1890 with a thesis titled, "The Toxic Products of the Bacillus of Hog Cholera". The following year, he completed the work needed to receive his M.D. He was married to Grace Garwood in 1891; the daughter of Dr. V. G. Garwood.

Following his graduation, Dr. Novy was made Assistant Professor of Hygiene and Physiological Chemistry at the University of Michigan. He made visits overseas, to the University of Prague in 1894 and the Pasteur Institute in 1897, where he became a friend of Emile Roux and improved his understanding of bacteriology. By 1900, he had gained a national reputation as the foremost national expert of the subject of bacteriology. The same year, he helped to found the Society of American Bacteriologists. He was made full professor at Michigan in 1904 and became the first chairman of the University's Department of Bacteriology.

It was early in the twentieth century that Dr. Novy began the study of trypanosomes and spirochetes, for which work he is best known. He developed techniques for their cultivation, and is possibly the first to cultivate a pathogenic protozoan in a laboratory. Among his other work, he performed studies of anaerobic bacteria, investigated an outbreak of the bubonic plague in San Francisco during 1900, researched anaphylotoxin, and studied the metabolism of microorganisms—especially the tubercle bacillus. In 1905, he was selected for membership on the Council on Pharmacy and Chemistry of the American Medical Association, a position he would retain until 1930. He was the Henry L. Russell Lecturer at the University of Michigan in 1927, then in 1931 the George M. Kober Lecturer at Georgetown University. In 1930, he was selected to be a gold medalist of the American Medical Association. He continued to contribute to the scientific research in bacteriology for the remainder of his career, publishing his final scientific paper in 1953 at the age of ninety.

Much of his later years were consumed by administrative work. He served as fourth president of the Society of American Bacteriologists in 1904, and was elected the president of the American Society for Experimental Pathology in 1921 and president of the American Association of Immunologists in 1924. Dr. Novy was chairman of the Executive Committee for the University of Michigan Medical School during 1930–33, then during 1933–35 he served as Dean of the University Medical School. He retired in 1935. His wife, Grace Garwood, died in 1946; Dr. Novy died at his Ann Arbor, Michigan home in 1957. He was survived by three sons and two daughters. All of his sons were practicing physicians.

In Sinclair Lewis's 1925 novel Arrowsmith, Dr. Novy was the model for the character of Max Gottlieb.

== Awards and honors ==
Dr. Novy was the recipient of numerous honors:

- Member, Association of American Physicians, 1900
- Honorary L.L.D., University of Cincinnati, 1920
- Member, National Academy of Sciences, 1924
- Chevalier of the Légion d'honneur, 1924
- Gold medalist, American Medical Association, 1930
- Service citation from the Legislature of the State of Michigan, 1931
- Member, Order of the White Lion of Czecho-Slovakia, 1931
- Member, American Philosophical Society, 1934
- Honorary L.L.D., University of Michigan, 1936

== See also ==
- List of nominees for the Nobel Prize in Physiology or Medicine (1920–1929)

== Bibliography ==
- Cocaine and its derivatives (1887)
- Directions for laboratory work in urine analysis (1892)
- Directions for laboratory work in bacteriology (1894)
- Ptomaïns, leucomaïns, toxins and antitoxins: or, the chemical factors in the causation of disease (1896) with Victor Clarence Vaughan
- Toxins & Antitoxins (1896)
- Laboratory work in physiological chemistry (1898)
- Laboratory work in bacteriology (1899)
- Cellular toxins (1902) with Victor Clarence Vaughan
- On the trypanosomes of birds (1905) with Ward J. MacNeal
- Studies in Spirillum Obermeieri and related organisms (1906)
- The trypanosomes of mosquitoes and other insects (1907)
- Zina Pitcher (1908)
- Anaphylatoxin and anaphylaxis (1917) with Paul Henry DeKruif and Robert Lev Novy
- Microbic respiration (1925)
