= Pierre Cathala =

French politician

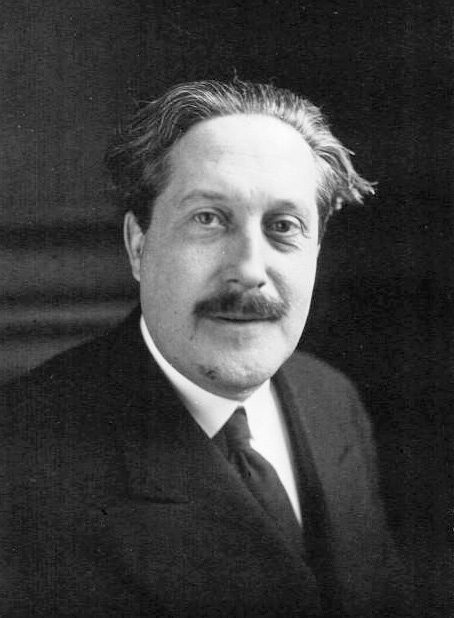
- Pierre Cathala in 1931
- Born: 22 September 1888; Montfort-sur-Meu, Ille-et-Vilaine, France
- Died: 27 July 1947 (aged 58); Paris, France
- Education: Lycée Saint-Louis
- Occupation: Politician
- Spouse: Mathilde Henriette Lagrange
- Children: 2 sons, 1 daughter
- Parent(s): Paul Cathala; Louise-Marie Pabot-Chatelard
- Relatives: Pierre-Félix Lagrange (father-in-law)

Pierre Cathala (French pronunciation: [pjɛʁ katala]; 1888 – 1947) was a French politician. He served as the French Minister of Finance from 1942 to 1944.

== Early life ==
Pierre Cathala was born on 22 September 1888 in Montfort-sur-Meu, Brittany, France. He was educated at the Lycée Saint-Louis, and in Bayonne where he became friends with Pierre Laval.

== Career ==
Cathala served as the French Minister of Finance from 1942 to 1944.

== Personal life ==
Cathala married Mathilde Henriette Lagrange. They had two sons, François and Jean-Claude, and a daughter, Renée.

== Death ==
Cathala died on 27 July 1947 in Paris, France.
