= Arboretum de Vendresse =

Arboretum in Ardennes, Grand Est, France

Coordinates: 49°37′N 4°48′E

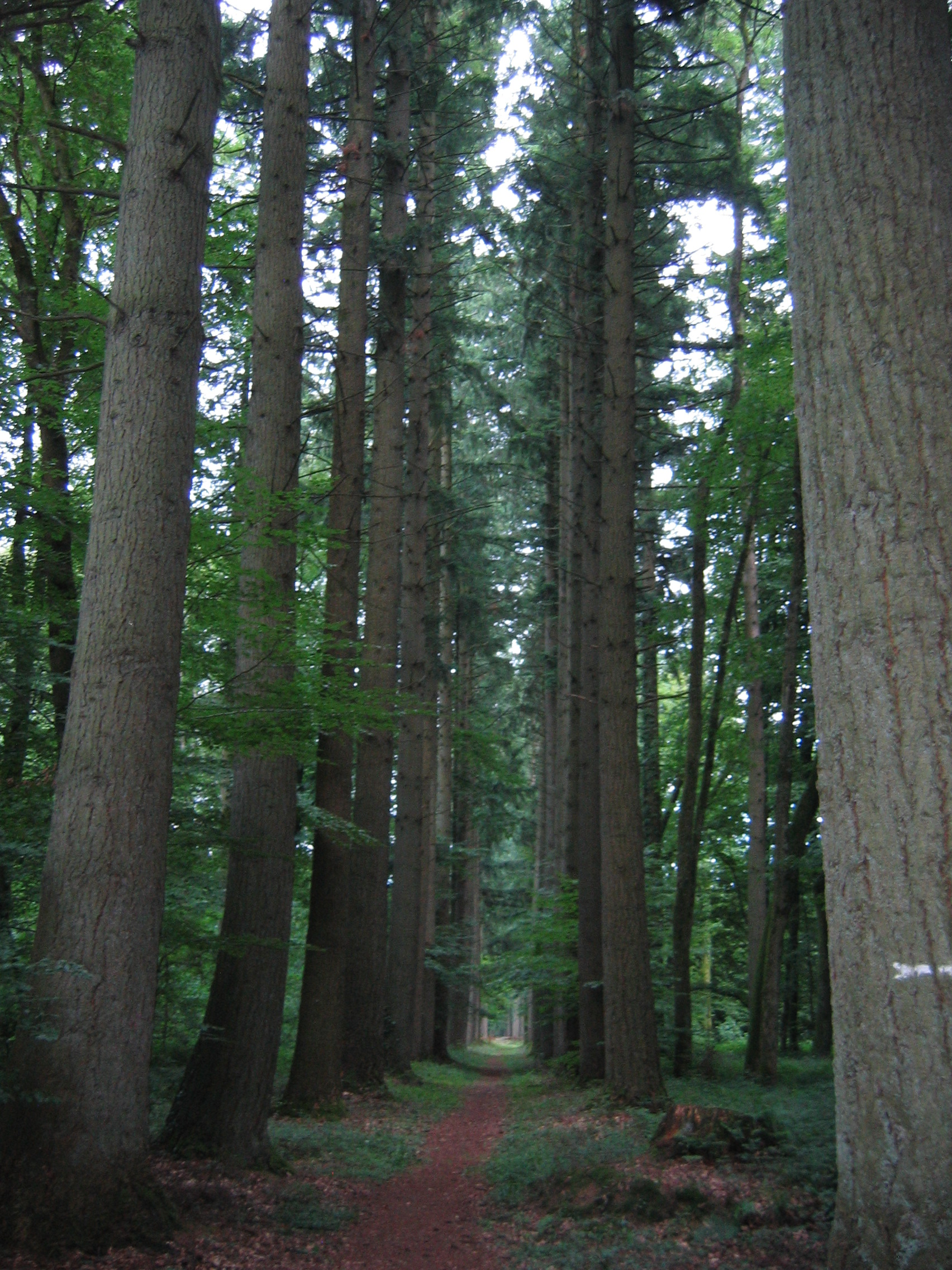

The Arboretum de Vendresse, also known as the Arboretum du Bois de la Vierge, is an arboretum located in Vendresse, Ardennes, Grand Est, France. It is open daily without charge.

The arboretum was established in 1912 by histologist Paul Bouin (1870–1962). It is located near the ruins of the Château de la Cassine, home of Louis of Gonzaga and Henriette de Clèves, and accessible from the path of the Bois de la Vierge. It contains a variety of local tree species, as well as an avenue planted with Douglas firs.

== See also ==
- List of botanical gardens in France
