= Pierre-Félix Lagrange =

French ophthalmologist (1857–1928)

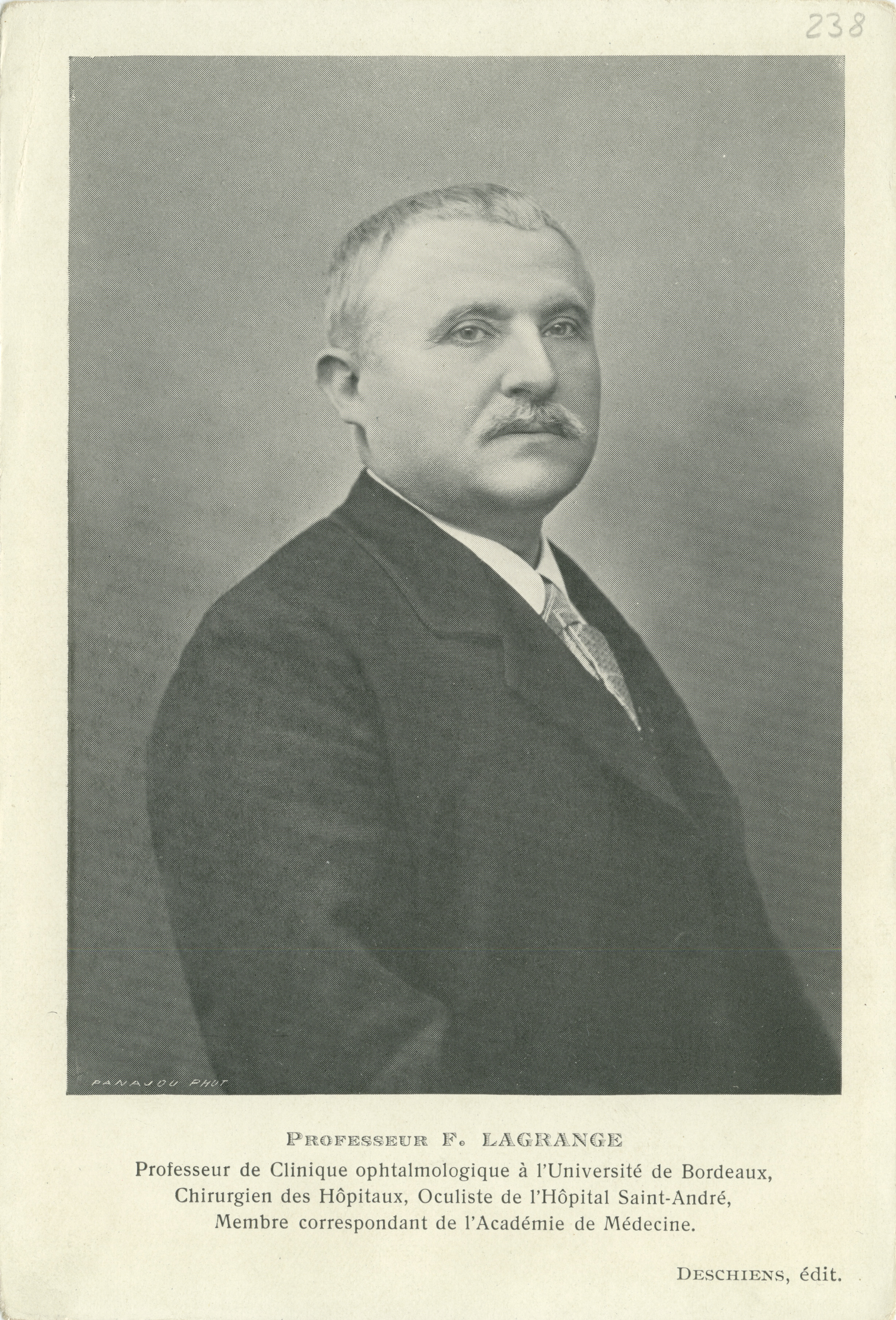
- Pierre-Félix Lagrange
- Born: 22 January 1857; Soumensac, lot-et-Garonne, France
- Died: 22 April 1928 (aged 71)
- Education: University of Bordeaux
- Occupation: Opthtalmologist
- Relatives: Pierre Cathala (son-in-law)

Pierre-Félix Lagrange (22 January 1857 – 22 April 1928) was a French ophthalmologist.

== Early life ==
Pierre-Félix Lagrange was born on January 22, 1857, in Soumensac, département lot-et-Garonne, France. He studied medicine at the University of Bordeaux in Bordeaux.

== Career ==
Lagrange was a professor with the faculty of medicine at Bordeaux. He was a specialist in the study and treatment of ophthalmic disorders, including eye tumors, strabismus, refraction anomalies and glaucoma. He is remembered for introducing a surgical technique that was a combination of an iridectomy and sclerectomy for treatment of glaucoma. This surgery was later referred to as a "sclerectoiridectomy" or "Lagrange's operation".

With Emile Valude (1857–1930), Lagrange was co-publisher of the Encyclopédie française d'ophtalmologie (1903–10).

== Death ==
He died on April 22, 1928. He was seventy-one years old.

== Selected writings ==
- Etudes sur les tumeurs de l'oeil, de l'orbite et des annexes. Paris, G. Steinheil, 1893.
- Rapport sur le diagnostic et le traitement des tumeurs de l'orbite. Paris, 1903.
- Atlas d'ophtalmoscopie de guerre. 1918
