= Bouin solution =

Biological preservative used in study of tissues

Bouin solution, or Bouin's solution, is a compound fixative used in histology. It was invented by French biologist Pol Bouin and is composed of picric acid, acetic acid and formaldehyde in an aqueous solution. Bouin's fluid is especially useful for fixation of gastrointestinal tract biopsies because this fixative allows crisper and better nuclear staining than 10% neutral-buffered formalin. It is not a good fixative when tissue ultrastructure must be preserved for electron microscopy. However, it is a good fixative when tissue structure with a soft and delicate texture must be preserved. The acetic acid in this fixative lyses red blood cells and dissolves small iron and calcium deposits in tissue. A variant in which the acetic acid is replaced with formic acid can be used for both fixation of tissue and decalcification. The effects of the three chemicals in Bouin solution balance each other. Formalin causes cytoplasm to become basophilic but this effect is balanced by the effect of the picric acid. This results in excellent nuclear and cytoplasmic H&E staining. The tissue hardening effect of formalin is balanced by the soft tissue fixation of picric and acetic acids. The tissue swelling effect of acetic acid is balanced by the tissue shrinking effect of picric acid.

Hydrated sections of formaldehyde-fixed tissue are usually pre-treated with Bouin solution to obtain correct results in the trichrome stains for contrasting colours in collagenous and cytoplasmic (muscle) fibres. The trichrome methods were devised for tissues fixed in acidic mixtures containing mercuric chloride, which are now used only on a small scale.) Only the picric acid component of Bouin's solution is needed to bring about this correction of trichrome staining.

Under the name "Bouin's fluid" this fixative is also widely used for marine invertebrates. It is prepared as follows: picric acid, saturated aqueous solution – 75 ml; formalin, 40% aqueous solution – 25 ml; acetic acid, glacial – 5 ml.

== Variations ==
=== Gendre solution ===
Gendre solution is an alcoholic version of Bouin solution. An alcoholic solution saturated with picric acid is used instead of an aqueous solution saturated with picric acid when making this solution. This solution is useful when glycogen and other carbohydrates must be preserved in tissue. It is prepared by a mixing saturated solution of picric acid in 95% ethanol (80ml) with formalin (37-40% formaldehyde) (15 ml) and glacial acetic acid (5ml). Gendre's fixative contains more picric acid than Bouin's, because of greater solubility (6.23%w/v) in ethanol than in water (1.23%w/v).

=== Hollande solution ===
Hollande solution is a version of Bouin solution that contains copper acetate. The copper acetate stabilizes red blood cell membranes and the granules of eosinophils and endocrine cells so that there is less lysis of these cell components than occurs in regular Bouin solution. Hollandes fixative is made by adding 6.25g cupric acetate, 10g picric acid (wet powder), 25ml formalin (37-40% formaldehyde) and 2.5 ml glacial (100%) acetic acid to 250ml water.
