= Auguste Prenant =

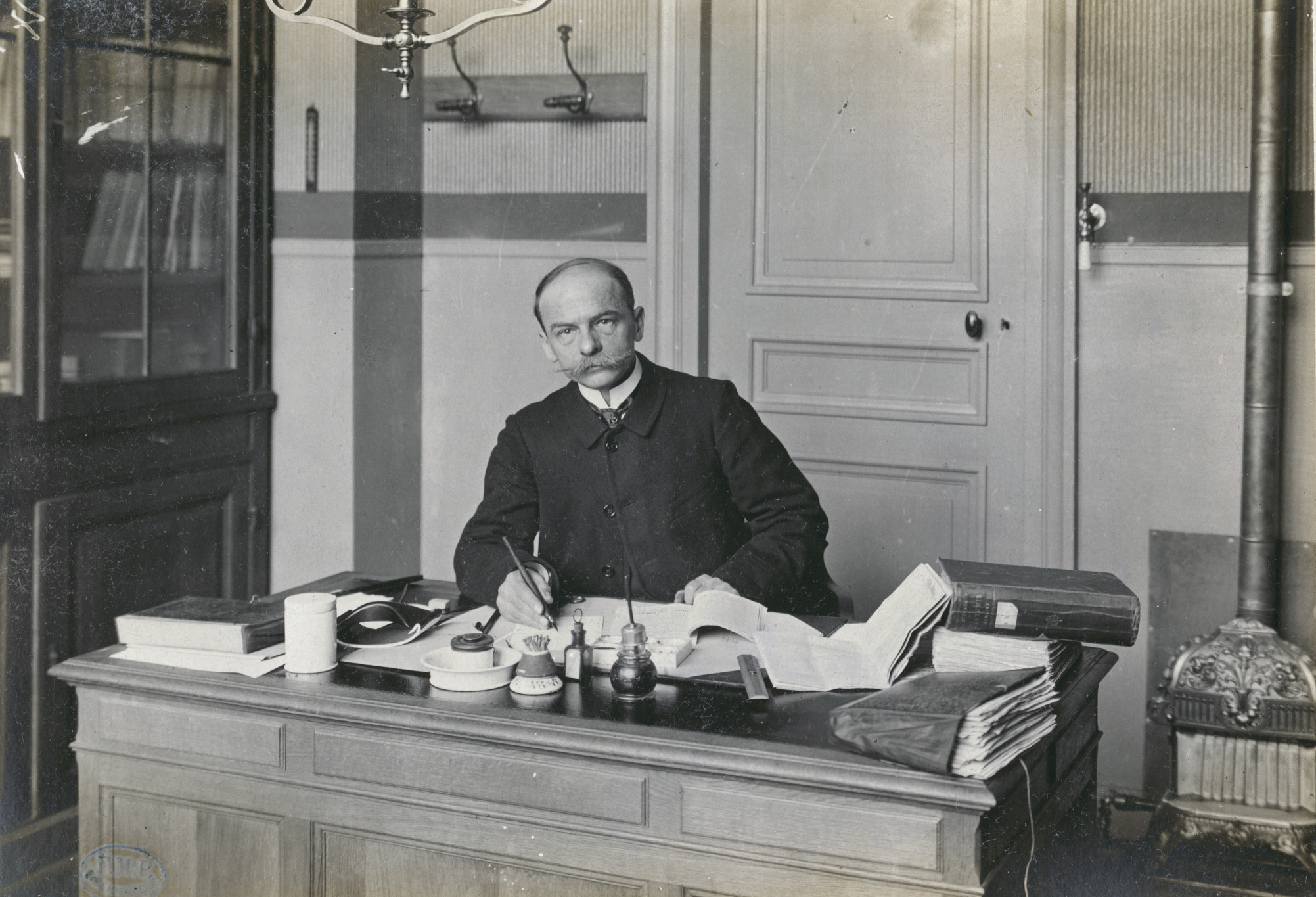
Prenant in his laboratory

Louis César Auguste Prenant (5 November 1861 – 28 September 1927) was a French histologist and professor of medicine at Nancy. He coauthored an influential textbook of histology Traité d'histologie and developed a histology laboratory at Nancy.

== Life and work ==
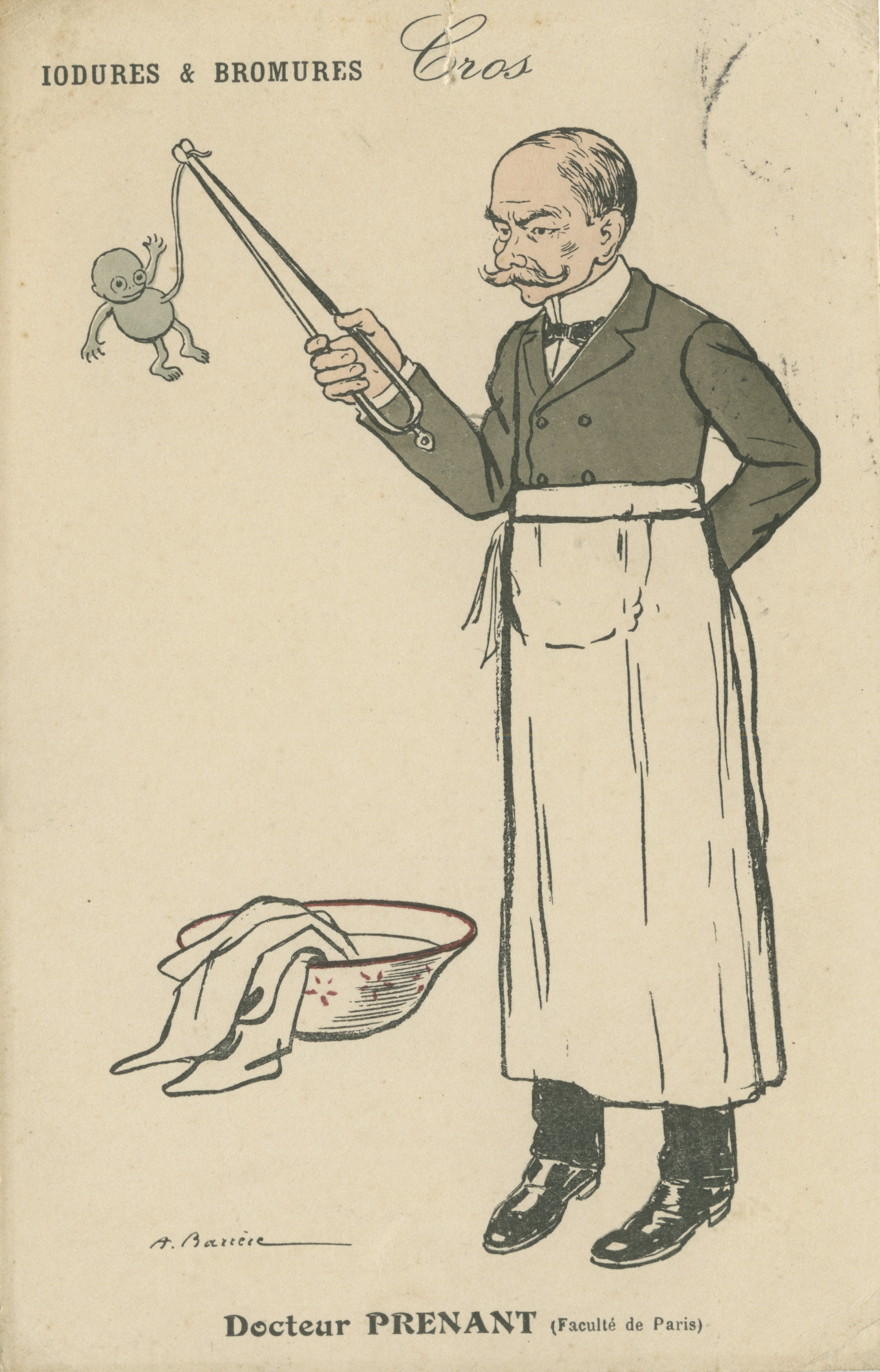
Caricature of Prenant

Prenant was born in Lyon (Rhône) son of army officer Louis Théophile. He studied natural sciences in 1882 and became a doctor of medicine in 1887. He became an assistant in natural history in 1883 at Nancy and began to head histology from 1886. He became a professor of histology in 1894 at Nancy succeeding Leon Baraban. In 1907 he moved to the faculty of medicine in Paris. His major work was on comparative embryology made in collaboration with Pol Bouin and Louis Camille Maillard. He studied the origin and development of gills, the notochord, eyes and endocrine organs. He also studied spermatogenesis in mammals. Prenant suggested in 1898 that the corpus luteum had a secretory function but he was not able to demonstrate it.

Prenant was elected member of the Academy of Medicine in 1911 and knighted Legion of Honour in 1910.
