= Trypanosome =

Trypanosome may refer to:

- Trypanosomatida, a biological order within Kinetoplastida
- Trypanosoma, a genus within Trypanosomatida whose members are often referred to as trypanosomes
- Trypanosoma brucei, a major human pathogen that causes sleeping sickness
- Trypanosoma cruzi, a major human pathogen that causes Chagas disease
- A morphological class of trypanosomatid with a flagellum laterally attached to the cell body
