= Sierzno =

- Village
- Location within Poland
- Coordinates: 54°7′4″N 17°28′17″E
- Country: Poland
- Voivodeship: Pomeranian
- County: Bytów
- Gmina: Bytów
- Population: 153

Sierzno ([ˈɕɛʐnɔ]; German: Zerrin) is a village in the administrative district of Gmina Bytów, within Bytów County, Pomeranian Voivodeship, in northern Poland.

== History ==
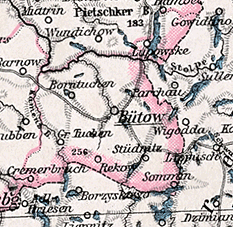
Kreis Bütow

== People ==
- Paul Albert Grawitz (1850–1932) a German pathologist
