= Pol Bouin =

French histologist and reproductive endocrinologist

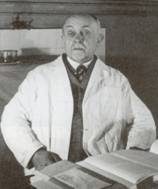

Pol André Bouin (11 June 1870 – 5 February 1962) was a French histologist and reproductive endocrinologist. He is best known for the fixative Bouin solution named after him.

Bouin was born in Vendresse, France into a family of veterinarians. He studied medicine at Nancy and was influenced by Auguste Prenant. He received a doctor of medicine degree in 1897. He worked as a histology preparator and later became a professor of anatomy in 1898. He succeeded Professor Prenant in the chair of histology at Nancy in 1908. Throughout his career, he conducted numerous experiments, particularly in the field of reproductive endocrinology. In 1929 he demonstrated that lactation could be induced in rabbits without ovaries by administering anterior pituitary extract at a time when prolactin had not yet been identified. In 1932 he published Elements d'histologie.
