= Paul Albert Ancel =

French biologist and physician (1873–1961)

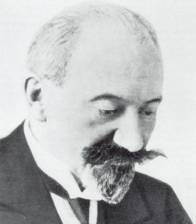
- Paul Albert Ancel, 1910
- Born: 21 September 1873; 17th arrondissement of Paris, France
- Died: 27 January 1961 (aged 87); Paris, France
- Occupations: Biologist, physician

Paul Albert Ancel (21 September 1873 – 27 January 1961) was a French professor of medicine who worked on cytology, physiology, and embryology. He studied endocrine functions of the Leydig cells of the testes along with Pol Bouin.

Ancel was born in Nancy from where he received a degree in medicine in 1899. He received a doctor of science in 1903 with a thesis on the hermaphroditic gonad of the snail Helix pomatia. He worked as a professor of anatomy at Lyon from 1904 under Leon Testut and moved to Nancy in 1908 where he taught anatomy. He worked under Adolph Nicolas and collaborated with Paul Bouin on Leydig cells. He worked at the institute of embryology at Strasbourg from 1919 and published more than 300 works relating to endocrinology, anatomy, cytology, embryology and teratology. His fellow researchers at Strasbourg include P. Vintemberger, Etienne Wolff, and S. Lallemand (his own daughter).

He was Knighted with the Legion of Honour (1921).
