= Rufus Cole =

American physician (1872–1966)

Rufus Cole (April 30, 1872 – April 20, 1966) was an American medical doctor and the first director of the Rockefeller University Hospital. Under his leadership significant advances in treatment of bacterial pneumonia and later against tuberculosis were made. In 1912 Cole and Alphonse Dochez developed a serum against Type 1 pneumococcus and also developed a method for testing whether an infection is caused by this or some other type of the bacterium. The New York Times in its obituary for Cole called him "a pioneer in clinical medicine" and "an authority on lobar pneumonia". The New York Times also wrote in the same obituary that Cole was President of Association of American Physicians in 1931, had honorary degrees from the University of Chicago and the National University of Ireland. Cole received Kober prize in 1938 for advances against tuberculosis. He is also credited by Franklin C. McLean for creating a blueprint for clinical studies.

== Early life and education ==
Cole was born in Rowsburg, Ohio. He graduated from the University of Michigan with an undergraduate degree and from Johns Hopkins University with a M.D. degree in 1899.

== Career ==
Cole became director of the Hospital of the Rockefeller Institute in 1908 and retired in 1937. During his retirement he wrote a two volume history of 17th century Britain: "Human History, the Seventeenth Century and the Stuart Family", Two Volumes by Rufus Cole (Hardcover – 1959). Cole died of pneumonia in a Washington hospital. He was 93 years old and lived in Mount Kisco, New York.

== Distinctions, degrees and memberships ==
=== Academic degrees ===
- University of Michigan, B.S., 1896
- Johns Hopkins University, M.D., 1899
- The University of Chicago, D.Sc. (Honorary), 1927
- National University of Ireland, D.Sc. (Honorary), 1933

=== Professional appointments ===
- The Johns Hopkins Hospital
  - Resident House Officer, 1899–1900
  - Assistant Resident Physician, 1900–1904
  - Instructor in Medicine, 1901–1904
  - Resident Physician and Associate in Medicine, 1904–1906
  - Assistant Physician in charge of the Biological Division of the Clinical Research Laboratory, 1906–1909
- Research Student under Professor A. Wassermann, Robert Koch, Berlin, 1903–1904
- Director of the Hospital of the Rockefeller Institute for Medical Research and Member of the Rockefeller Institute, 1908–1937;
  - Member Emeritus, 1937–1966
- Board of Managers, St Luke's Hospital, New York, 1938–1946
- Board of Manager, Memorial Hospital, New York, 1938–1944
- Advisory Committee, department of Welfare, Westchester County, 1935
- Consultant in Bacteriology, New York State Department of Health, 1936
- Consulting Physician, Willard Parker Hospital, 1912–1920

=== Awards ===
- Medaille d'Honneur de l'Assistance Publique de la Republique Francaise, 1926
- Kober Medal, Association of American Physicians, 1938
- Academy Medal, New York Academy of Medicine, 1953
- Kovalenko Award, National Academy of Sciences, 1966 (Posthumously)
