= Paul Grawitz =

German pathologist (1850–1932)

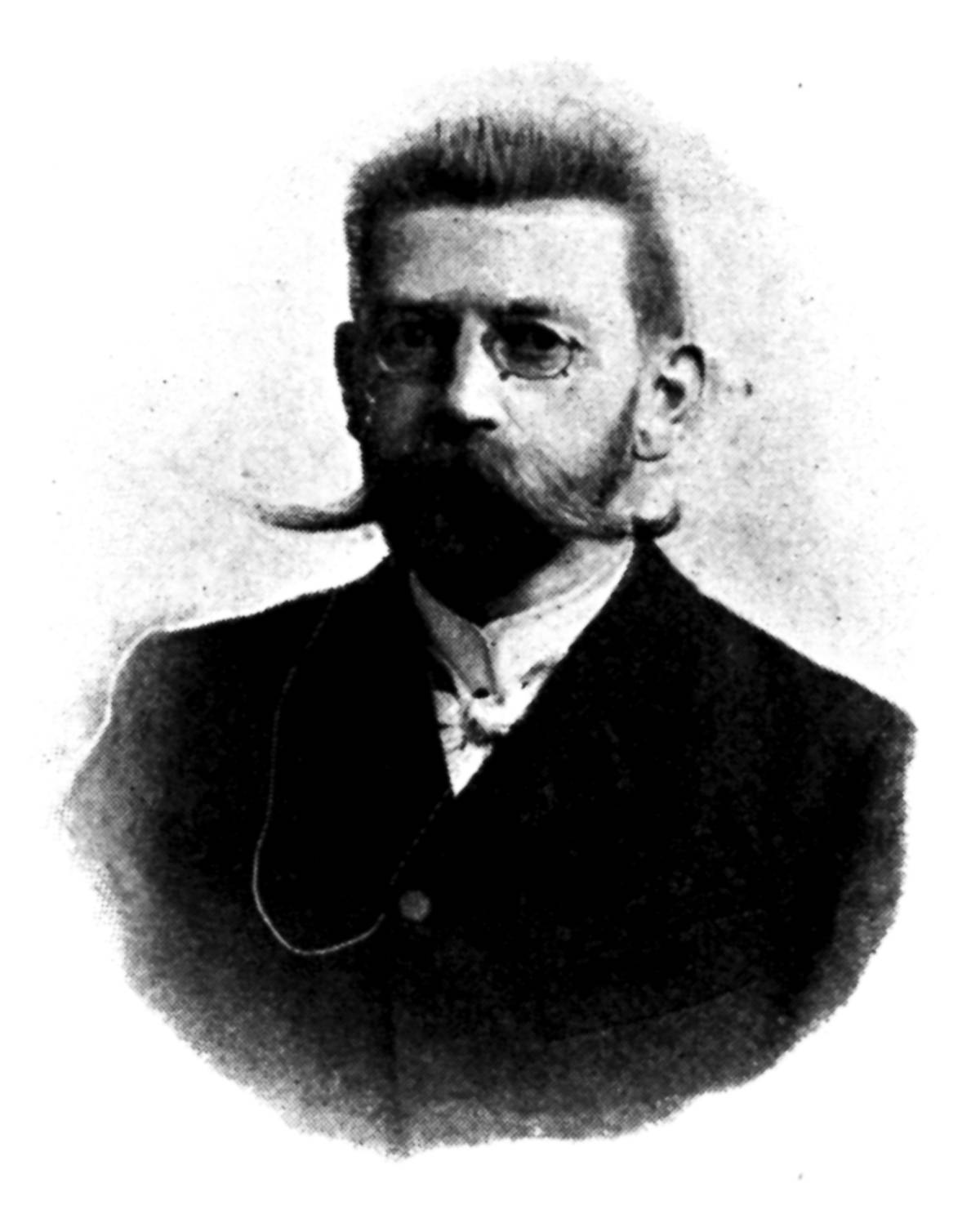
Paul Albert Grawitz (1850-1932)

Paul Albert Grawitz (born 1 October 1850 in Zerrin/Sierzno, Kreis Bütow (cf.Bütow/Bytów), Pommern (now Poland) – 27 June 1932 in Greifswald) was a German pathologist. He was an older brother to hematologist Ernst Grawitz (1860-1911), and father-in-law to pathologist Otto Busse (1867-1922).

While he studied medicine at the University of Berlin, he was an assistant to pathologist Rudolf Virchow (1821-1902). After graduation, he continued as an assistant to Virchow until 1886. From 1886 to 1921, he taught as a professor at the University of Greifswald, where he also served as director of the pathological institute.

He is known for his pioneer work with tissue cultures, and his experimentation in the field of bacteriology. "Grawitz' tumour", also known as renal cell carcinoma, is named after him.

== Literary works ==
- Geschichte der Medizinischen Fakultät Greifswald 1806-1906, Greifswald: Verlag von Julius Abel, 1906. - History of the Greifswald medical faculty.
- Die Medizin der Gegenwart in Selbstdarstellungen, 2 vols, 1923

== See also ==
- Tumors and cancer of the kidney (renal cancer)

== See also ==
- Grawitzsche Geschwulst (Grawitz tumo(u)r, nephrocellular carcinoma), see Renal cell carcinoma
- University of Greifswald
