= Rowsburg, Ohio =

Unincorporated community in Ohio, U.S.

Coordinates: 40°51′31″N 82°09′21″W

Rowsburg is an unincorporated community in Ashland County, in the U.S. state of Ohio.

== History ==
Rowsburg was laid out and platted in 1835 by Michael D. Row, and named for him. A former variant name of Rowsburg was Rows. A post office called Rows was established in 1840, and remained in operation until 1905.

== Notable person ==
Rufus Cole, a medical researcher and first director of the Rockefeller University Hospital, was born in Rowsburg in 1872.
