= Ernst Grawitz (hematologist) =

German physician (1860–1911)

Ernst Grawitz (18 March 1860, Mittelhagen, Kreis Greifenberg – 11 July 1911) was a German internist remembered for his work in the field of hematology. He was a younger brother of pathologist Paul Grawitz (1850-1932).

He studied medicine in Berlin, earning his degree in 1882. Following graduation, he served as a military physician, subsequently working as a prosector at the Augusta Hospital (Auguste-Viktoria-Klinikum) in Berlin (1886-1889). Afterwards, he was an assistant at the Berlin-Charité.

In 1890 he was habilitated for internal medicine, becoming an associate professor in 1897 as well as chief physician at the city hospital (Städtischen Krankenhaus) in Charlottenburg.

== Principal works ==
- Klinische Pathologie des Blutes, 1896 - Clinical pathology of the blood.
- Methodik der klinischen Blut-untersuchungen, 1902 - Methods for clinical blood tests.
- Hämatologie des praktischen Arztes, 1907 - Haematology for the practitioner.
