= Jacques Ancel =

French geographer and geopolitician (1879 – 1943)

Jacques Ancel (22 July 1879 in Parmain, Val-d'Oise – 1943 Alloue Charente) was a French geographer and geopolitician. He was the author of several books, including Peoples and Nations of Balkans: political geography (1926) and Geopolitics (1936).

After studying history and geography and professing as a teacher, Ancel was drafted to fight in World War I. Wounded three times, he was detached to the Headquarters of the French Army's Oriental Corps (fighting in the Ottoman Empire and the Balkans). After the war, he helped mediate the tense relations between Yugoslavia and Bulgaria. In 1930, Ancel obtained his doctorate with the thesis La Macédoine, étude de colonisation contemporaine ("Macedonia, a study in contemporary colonization").

He taught at the University of Paris' Institute of Higher International Studies, and was a corresponding member of the Romanian Academy and of other scientific forums. He was a knight of the Légion d'honneur.

Ancel was imprisoned in Drancy and Royallieu-Compiègne internment camps during World War II due to his Jewish background. He died of complications from his poor treatment in 1943, and was officially declared Mort pour la France.

== Works ==
- 1901, Une page inédite de Saint-Simon.
- 1902, La Formation de la colonie du Congo Français (1843–1882), Paris, Bulletin du Comité de l'Afrique Française.
- 1919, L'unité de la politique bulgare, 1870–1919, Editions Bossard.
- 1921, Les Travaux et les jours de l'Armée d'Orient. 1915–1918.
- 1923, Manuel historique de la question d'Orient (1792–1923), Delagrave.
- 1926, Peuples et nations des Balkans (réédité par CTHS en 1992).
- 1929, Histoire contemporaine depuis le milieu du XIXe siècle (avec la collaboration d'Henri Calvet). Manuel de politique européenne, histoire diplomatique de l'Europe (1871–1914), PUF.
- 1930, La Macédoine, étude de colonisation contemporaine.
- 1936, Géopolitique, Paris, Delagrave.
- 1938, Géographie des frontières, préface d'André Siegfried, Paris, Gallimard.
- 1940, Manuel Géographique de politique européenne. 2. L'Allemagne, Paris, Delagrave.
- 1945, Slaves et Germains, Paris, Librairie Armand Colin, 1945.
