= Kurt Huldschinsky =

Kurt Huldschinsky (1883 in Berlin – 31 October 1940, in Alexandria) was a German pediatrician of Prussian heritage. He completed his medical studies prior to serving in the Deutsches Heer as a field medic in World War I and later, after the Great War, he became a practicing medical doctor and research scientist, when in the winter of 1918/1919, he successfully demonstrated how rickets could be treated with mercury vapour lamps tuned to the UV wavelengths. Dr. Huldschinsky originally tried to adapt existing X-Ray technology. At that time of his discovery perhaps half of all German children suffered from rickets to varying degrees. It was already understood that this disease was caused by calcium deficiency, but the metabolic process for its uptake was not understood. Up to that point, heliotherapy was a common protocol for many illnesses and showed promise in relieving the effects of rickets. The bio-chemical mechanism triggered in the human dermis by the sun's electromagnetic radiation was not yet discovered, and scientists were mostly exploring the long wavelength (red) end of the sun's spectrum. To generate artificial UV, He was awarded the Otto Heubner Prize of the German Association of Pediatrics in 1926, and was nominated for the Nobel Prize in Medicine.

As Dr. Huldschinsky was Jewish, and had household workers of Jewish heritage and faith, he needed to flee Nazi Germany so he, his Christian wife Maria (née Straßer) and their only child, Eva, emigrated to Egypt in 1934. There, he continued his professional work in healthcare delivery and published further medical science articles. He died in Alexandria on 15 December 1940 from malignant hyperthermia after a minor operation to deal with a thrombosis.

== Literature ==
- Rachitis lässt sich durch ultraviolettes Licht heilen, Berliner Zeitung, 14. April 2007
- Benjamin Kuntz: “Light instead of cod liver oil”. Ultraviolet irradiation against rickets (Jewish Miniatures Vol. 282A). Hentrich & Hentrich, Leipzig 2022, ISBN 978-3-95565-535-8
