= Friedrich Martius =

German internist

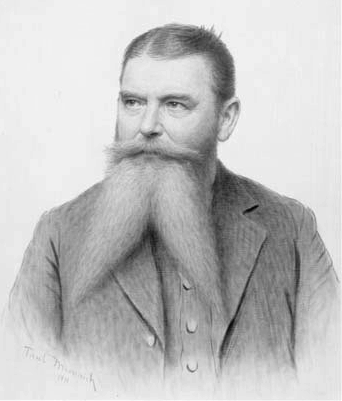
Friedrich Martius (c. 1900)

Friedrich Martius (7 September 1850, Erxleben – 1 October 1923, Rostock) was a German internist who was one of the pioneers of constitutional thought in medicine. He was the father of philosopher Hedwig Conrad-Martius (1888–1966).

He studied medicine at the Pépinière in Berlin, obtaining his doctorate in 1874. Following graduation, he served as a military doctor, and afterwards worked as an assistant in the clinic of Carl Gerhardt in Berlin. In 1887 he received his habilitation, and later was appointed personal physician to Frederick Francis III, Grand Duke of Mecklenburg-Schwerin. In 1891 he relocated to the University of Rostock as an associate professor and director of the medical clinic. In 1899 he attained a full professorship at Rostock.

== Published works ==
He was the author of numerous scientific articles, being especially known for works associated with cardiac and gastric disorders.

- Die Magensäure des Menschen, kritisch und experimentell, 1892 – Gastric acid in humans, etc.
- Tachycardie; eine klinische Studie, 1895 – Tachycardia, a clinical study.
- Achylia gastrica, ihre Ursachen und ihre Folgen. Mit einem anatomischen Beitrage von O. Lubarsch, 1897 – Achylia gastrica, its causes and its consequences, with anatomical contributions by Otto Lubarsch.
- Pathogenese innerer Krankheiten, nach Vorlesungen für Studirende und Ärzte, 1899 – Pathogenesis of internal diseases; according to lectures.
- Neurasthenische Entartung einst und jetzt. Tröstliche Betrachtungen eines Kulturoptimisten, 1909 – Neurasthenic degeneration past and present.
- Konstitution und Vererbung in ihren Beziehungen zur Pathologie, 1914 – Constitution and inheritance in its relationship with the pathology.
