= Vendresse =

- Commune
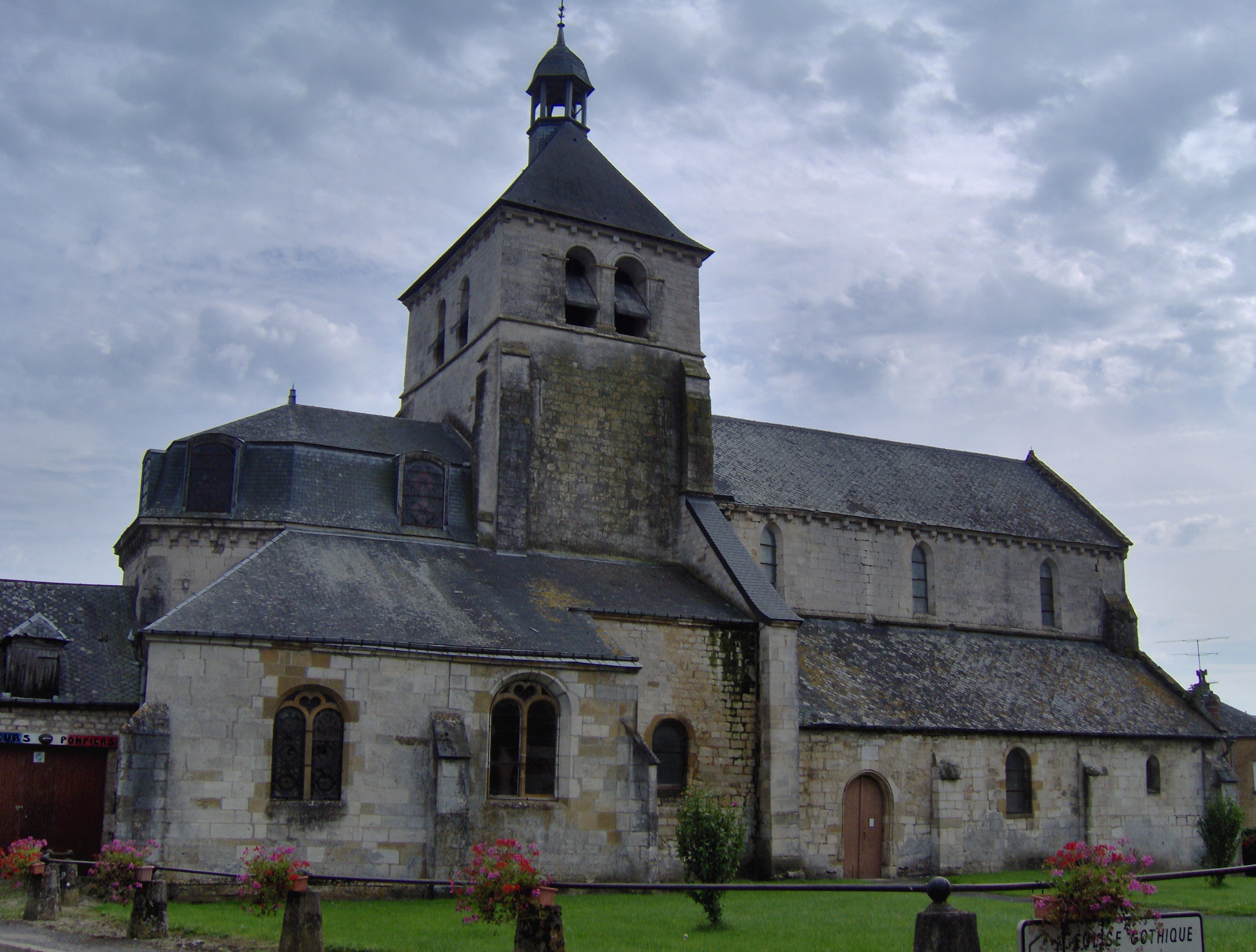
- The church in Vendresse
- Location of Vendresse
- Location within France Location within Grand Est
- Coordinates: 49°36′17″N 4°47′41″E
- Country: France
- Region: Grand Est
- Department: Ardennes
- Arrondissement: Charleville-Mézières
- Canton: Nouvion-sur-Meuse
- Intercommunality: Crêtes Préardennaises

Government
  - Mayor (2020–2026): Marie-France Barbe
- Area^{1}: 43.22 km^{2} (16.69 sq mi)
- Highest elevation: 303 m (994 ft)
- Lowest elevation: 163 m (535 ft)
- Population (2023): 486
  - Density: 11.2/km^{2} (29.1/sq mi)
- Time zone: UTC+01:00 (CET)
  - Summer (DST): UTC+02:00 (CEST)
- INSEE/Postal code: 08469 /08160
- ^{1} French Land Register data, which excludes lakes, ponds, glaciers > 1 km^{2} (0.386 sq mi or 247 acres) and river estuaries.

Vendresse (French pronunciation: [vɑ̃dʁɛs]) is a commune in the Ardennes department and Grand Est region of north-eastern France.

== Population ==
Historical population
| Year | Pop. | ±% p.a. |
|---|---|---|
| 1968 | 515 | — |
| 1975 | 469 | −1.33% |
| 1982 | 406 | −2.04% |
| 1990 | 402 | −0.12% |
| 1999 | 400 | −0.06% |
| 2007 | 474 | +2.14% |
| 2012 | 511 | +1.51% |
| 2017 | 494 | −0.67% |
| 2023 | 486 | −0.27% |
Source: INSEE

The inhabitants of Vendresse are known as Vendressois in French.

== Sights ==
- Arboretum de Vendresse

== See also ==
- Communes of the Ardennes department
- Jambon sec des Ardennes
