= Arturo Donaggio =

Italian physician (1868–1942)

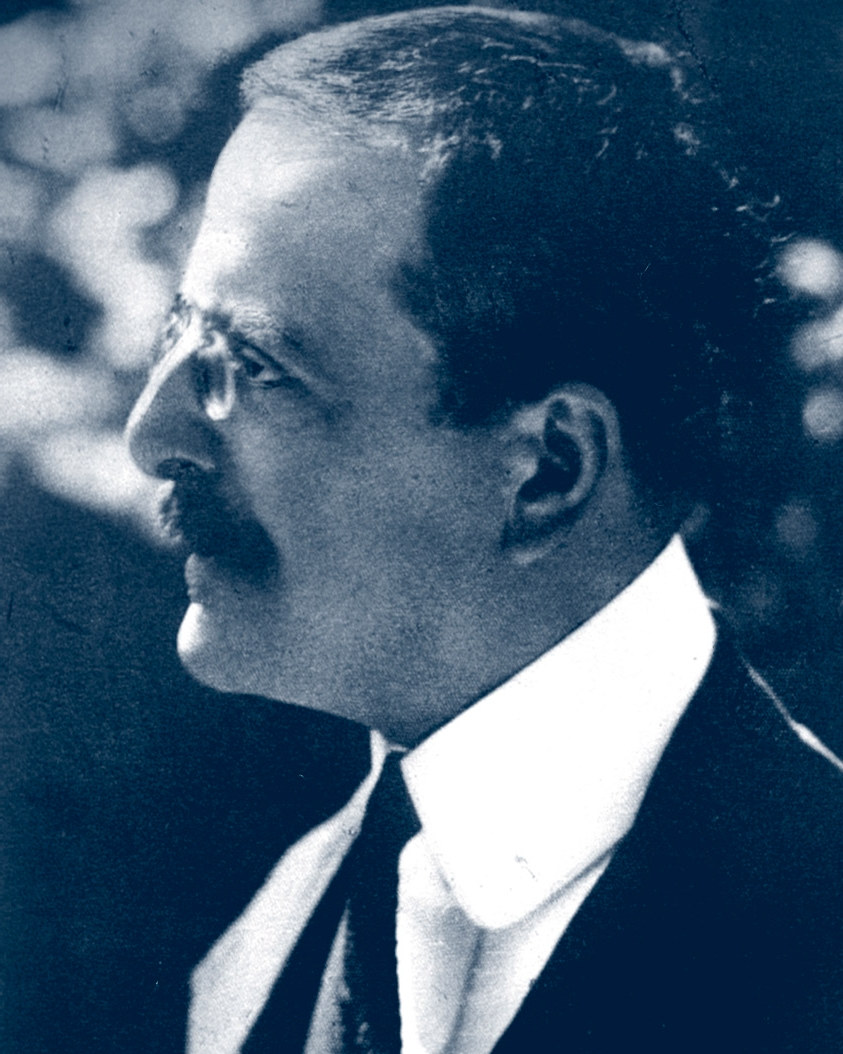
- Born: 11 October 1868; Falconara Marittima (AN),
- Died: 8 October 1942 (aged 73); Bologna
- Scientific career
- Fields: anatomy, pathology, physiology, semeiotics, physiatry, social medicine.
- Institutions: Hospital of San Lazzaro (Reggio-Emilia); University of Modena; University of Cagliari; University of Turin; University of Bologna

Sir Arturo Donaggio (11 October 1868 – 8 October 1942) was an Italian physician specialized in psychiatry and professor at University of Turin, Modena and Bologna. Donaggio was a defender and a supporter of the cure for alienated people in mental hospital (he promoted some reforms for asylum legislation) and he was a follower of the positivistic doctrine related to physiology and mental pathology.

== Biography ==
=== Early life ===
Arturo Donaggio was born in Falconara Marittima (Ancona), on October 11, 1868, from his parents Girolamo and Lucia Bosi.

=== Career and personal life ===
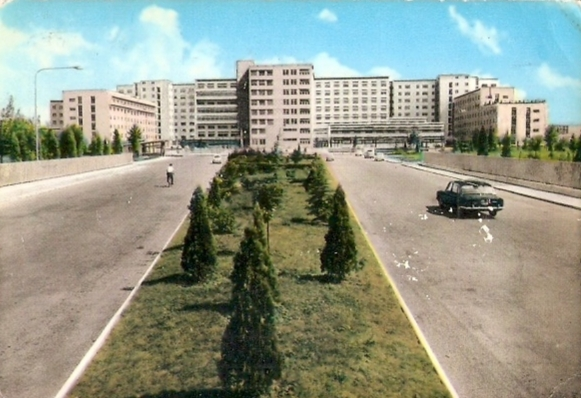
University-Hospital Polyclinic of Modena

At the age of 25 he graduated in Medicine at the Modena's Atheneum. He then followed post-graduate training under Professor Augusto Tamburini in the mental hospital of San Lazzaro in Reggio-Emilia, where Donaggio had the opportunity to attend Giulio Vasale’s laboratories, wherein anatomical researches took place. Shortly after obtaining a teaching position in neuropsychiatry in 1901, he replaced Augusto Tamburini as chairman professor at the University of Modena

In 1907 he conquered the position as chairman of nervous and mental diseases' departments at the University of Cagliari and only two years later, in 1909, he was awarded to the teaching of psychiatry at the University of Turin, Donaggio was the succeeder of Cesare Lombroso. He was also interested in the history of medicine, and, particularly fascinated by the figures of Marcello Malpighi, Bernardino Ramazzini and Antonio Scarpa. Moreover, he was president of the Italian Society of Psychiatry and the Italian Society of Neurology, and the latter's official representative at various international neurological and neuropsychiatric congresses. He had an energetic and distinguished, as much as closed and solitary character, which prevented him from creating solid emotional relationships both in his work and private life

In 1911 was nominated Full Professor at the University of Modena, where he remained for 25 years, also investing the role of director from 1926 to 1927 and from 1935 to 1936.

During the First World War, Donaggio enrolled as Lieutenant Colonel Doctor at the hospital of Modena, and he set up a school for wounded and illiterate soldiers. He was the founder and the president of the Provincial Board of Modena, that later on mutated in the National organization for the educational assistance of war orphans. At the age of 67, profoundly attracted by the city of Bologna, Donaggio decided to move there, accepting the management of the Clinic of Nervous and Mental Illness. Along with Carlo Livi and Enrico Morselli, Donaggio instituted the Experimental Magazine of Psychiatry and from 1935 to 1942 was nominated president of the Italian Society of psychiatry and from 1911 also member of the board of directors of the Italian Society of Neurology. The Italian Society of Psychiatry was the only scientific association who approved the race manifesto.

=== Late life ===
Shortly before his retirement, he signed the Manifesto of Race, a document which supported the idea of the existence of a pure Italian's Aryan race origin. The year 1938 marked Donaggio's retirement from teaching due to his advanced age and the University of Bologna honored him with the title of ‘Emeritus Professor’. He died from a car accident on 8 October 1942 in his beloved Bologna. The funeral, organized by the University of Bologna, was held on 10 October 1942 in the absence of relatives and friends. .

== Scientific activity ==
As the historian Tommaso dell'Era stated in his essay "Destino degli scienziati razzisti nel dopoguerra", reconstructing Arturo Donaggio's scientific career is made difficult by the fact that the doctor did not leave a personal archive, so the only documentary evidence of his academic and professional activities can be found in the catalogues of the universities where he studied and worked, or in the hospitals where he practiced. Despite his specialization in neuropsychiatry, he was a man of wide-ranging interests and his contribution to science covers many areas of medicine, from anatomy and pathology to physiology, semeiotics, the clinic of the nervous system, physiatry and social medicine.

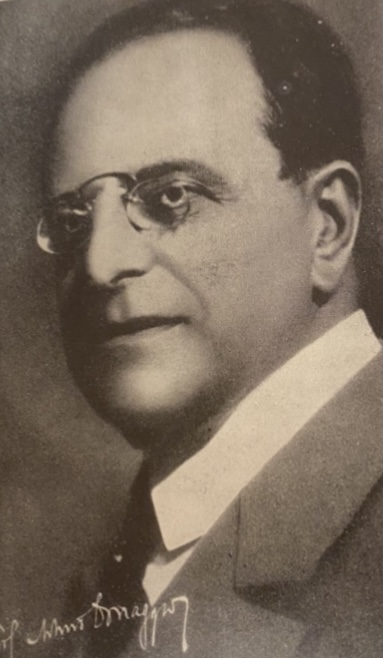
Arturo Donaggio: president of the Italian Society of psychiatry until 1942

=== Donaggio's method and phenomenon ===
Arturo Donaggio was the inventor of the histological method that bears his surname, a way of staining nerve tissue fibers, based on ammonium molybdate, nitric pyridine, petroleum ether, thionine and dammar resin. To understand the significance of this discovery, it is necessary to remember that, at the end of the 19th century, the most widely used staining method was the one developed by the Italian Camillo Golgi in 1873; an optical microscopy technique, also known as silver stain, which allows good visualization in black of the cells of nervous tissue and their organelles. The Donaggio's method takes its inspiration from Golgi's one, with the subsequent modifications by Ramon y Cajal, refining and improving it. Today, Donaggio's method is the one most frequently used to establish the fine histological changes of the nerve cell under physiological and pathological conditions. Using his staining method, Professor Donaggio was able to observe in vertebrate nerve cells a peripheral system of thin filaments arranged in a radial pattern, and an endocellular neurofibrillary network, consisting of filaments that branch and anastomose to each other, accumulating around the nucleus where they form a ring-shaped cluster. These filaments run along cytoplasmic extensions and communicate with the axon, participating in the conduction of the nerve impulse.

=== Innovations in pathology ===
Donaggio's research activity in the field of pathology was extremely prolific and varied. In 1894 he described in epileptics an amplification of skin reflexes in contrast to tendon reflexes, which can be considered prodromal signs of an epileptic seizure. In 1904 he found a method to highlight nerve fiber lesions in the earliest stages of secondary degeneration. Donaggio was also the author of the two laws that regulate the pathology of the neurofibrillary network in adult mammals:

1. the "law of resistance" in front of pathogenic actions, even intense but univocal;
2. the "law of vulnerability" in front of specific combined actions, according to which the network breaks up into tiny parts if two or more harmful causes (such as X-rays, cold) act on it simultaneously.

He conducted studies on the communication pathways of the cerebral hemispheres and identified the dual extrapyramidal and pyramidal motor function of the ascending frontal circumvolution. These data were confirmed when he specified the anatopathological alterations in encephalitic parkinsonism and were approved by the scientific world. Donaggio was, among other things, the discoverer of the lesions of the substantia nigra and of the frontal cortex in Parkinson's and founded the cortico nigric doctrine on the importance of the frontal lobe in extrapyramidal motility. This discovery, presented in Naples in 1923 and in Brussels in 1924, was confirmed by many distinctive neuropathologists. Donaggio also described a new type of Parkinson's disease, known as very late, because of the delay in its onset; we also owe to him our knowledge of the effect of anesthetics on nerve cells and the discovery of corpuscles (Lentz bodies) located in the hippocampus of animals inoculated with the fixed rabies virus.

=== Social research ===
Extremely active in the field of social research, Donaggio applied the field of neuropsychiatry to the subject of labor. He emphasized the superiority of handicraft and manual work, based on inventiveness and creativity, elements that characterize the human mind, over factory work, linked to the use of machines. The latter induces conditions such as monotony, automatism, dissociation between the personality of the worker and the product of the work, which significantly slow down the mental development of the worker. This theory was expounded by Professor Donaggio at various symposia: National Congress of Occupational Medicine in Florence (1922), National Congress of Occupational Medicine in Venice (1924), Science Congress in Turin (1928), International Congress of Mental Hygiene in Paris (1937).

== Controversies ==
=== Fascism ===
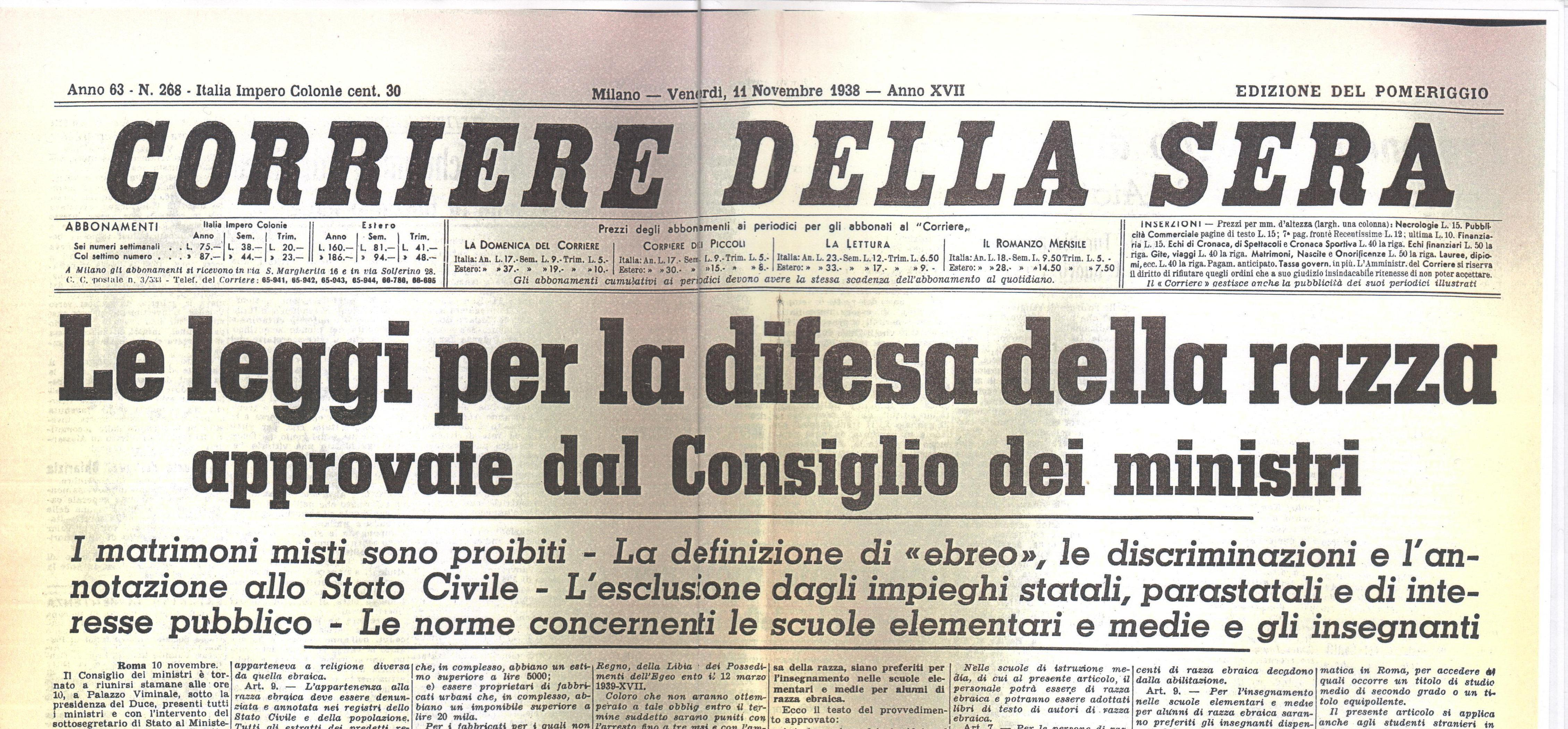
Front page of the Italian newspaper Corriere della Sera on 11 November 1938: the laws for the defense of the race approved by the Council of Ministers

The fascist regime’s attempt to influence Italian social life in all its aspects became more insistent as time went by. In 1932 under the presidency of Donaggio, with a referendum among members, the anachronistic name of the Society of Psychiatrists was changed from "Società Freniatica italiana" to "Società Italiana di Psichiatria" (SIP, Italian Society of Psychiatry). This event represented the turning point from the old-styled generation of the "alienists", also known as "freniatrists", who were the institute's founders of the 19th century. Along with other 9 Italian scientists Donaggio signed in 1938 the "Manifesto of Race", also known as the "Charter of Race". Published, with the title "Fascism and the problems of race", in 'Il Giornale d'Italia' of 14 July 1938, the Manifesto of racist scientists or Manifesto of race, anticipated the promulgation of the fascist racial legislation by a few weeks (September–October 1938 ). The Manifesto became the ideological and pseudo-scientific basis of the racist politics of fascist Italy. The manifesto affirmed the biological conception of ethnicity, the existence of a pure Italian race and the disdain towards Jewish people who were discarded as non Europeans. Even though Donaggio never abjured his participation to the fascist cause, he was not one of the manifesto's authors nor expressed in his works any type of hate or dissent towards Jewish and Black people.

=== Ideology influences ===
The Italian Society of Psychiatry, chaired by Donaggio, was the only scientific entity to support the manifesto of the race. It is therefore difficult to reconstruct the moral and intellectual path that led Donaggio, at an advanced age and a few months after retirement, to sign the Manifesto. There was probably contact and pressure from governmental and academic circles, perhaps even from Alessandro Ghigi, member of the fascist party since 1924, who led the University of Bologna through the difficult phase of the dismissal of Jewish professors, following the racial laws of 1938. Therefore, besides the fact that Donaggio was a subscriber, in 1925, of the Manifesto of Fascist Intellectuals drafted by Gentile, it is a proven truth that the real essence of his ideals was his fiery nationalism.

== Bibliography ==
- Arcieri G.P., " Arturo Donaggio" in Figure della medicina contemporanea italiana, Fratelli Bocca Editori, Milano 1952, pp. 115–120
- Arioti E., "Un razzista all’Università di Bologna: Arturo Donaggio", ANPI (Associazione Nazionale Psichiatri Italiani), November 2018
- Dell’Era T., "Destino degli scienziati razzisti nel dopoguerra", Storia della Shoah in Italia. Vicende, memorie, rappresentazioni, 2010, 2: 235-247
- Fiasconaro, L., "Arturo Donaggio" in Dizionario biografico degli italiani, Istituto della Enciclopedia italiana, Roma 1992, vol. 41.
- Molinari, S., "Arturo Donaggio" in Esploratori del cervello. Immagini di neuroscienziati in Biblioteca scientifica, IRCCS Fondazione Mondino, Pavia 2020, p.15
- Patriarca C., Sirugo G., Barbareschi M., "Jewish anatomic pathologists in the time of Italian Racial Laws", Pathologica, Journal of the Italian Society of anatomic pathology and diagnostic cytopathology, April 2022, vol.114, issue 2, p.180
- Pazzini A., "Arturo Donaggio" in Storia della medicina, Società Editrice Libraria, Milano 1947, II, p. 321
- Sacchetti E., Mencacci C.,"Evidence based psychiatric care", Official journal of the Italian society of psychiatry, March 2015, 1(1):6-8
