= Soumensac =

- Commune
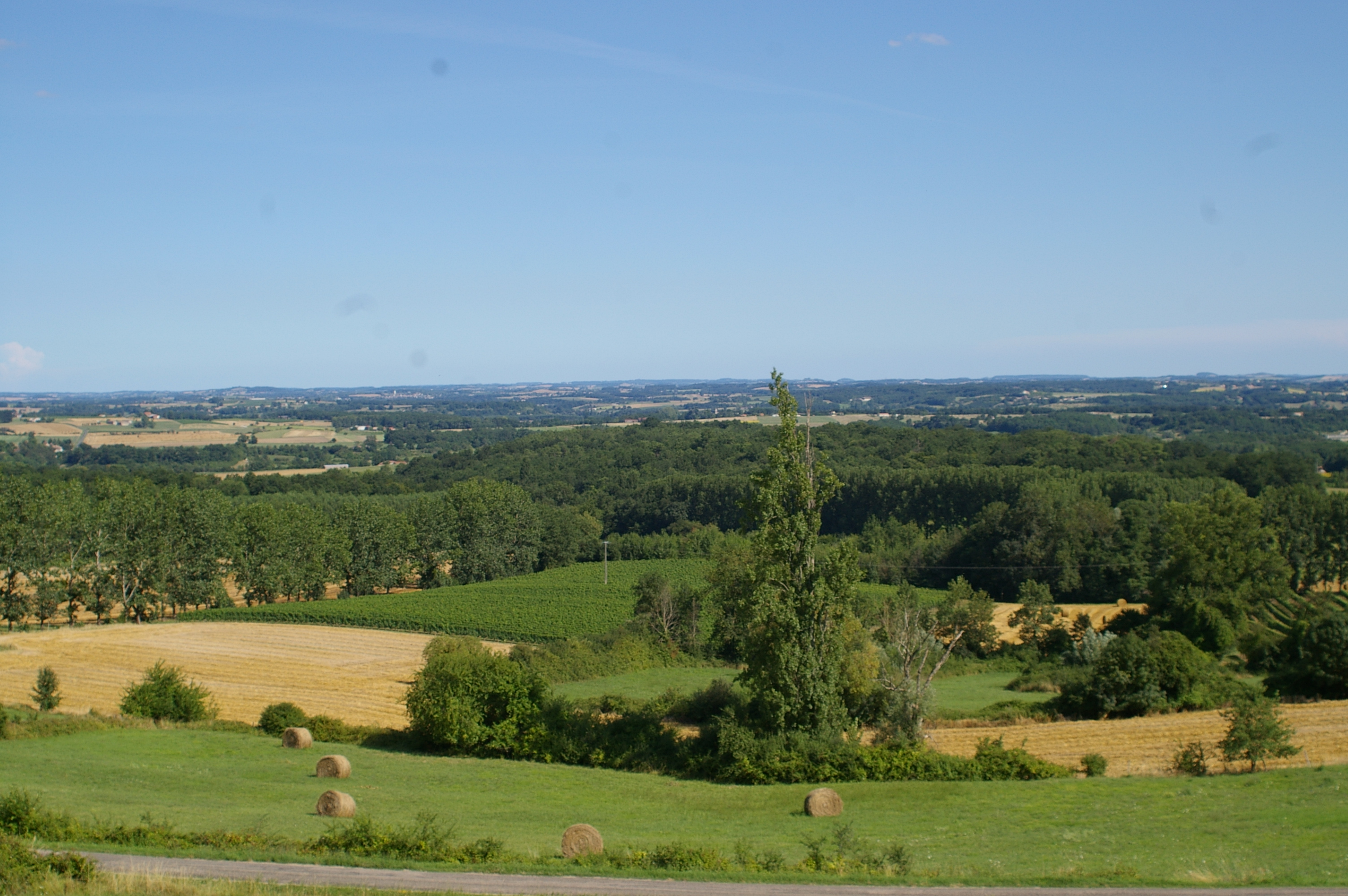
- The landscape of Soumensac
- Location of Soumensac
- Location within France Location within Nouvelle-Aquitaine
- Coordinates: 44°41′26″N 0°19′40″E
- Country: France
- Region: Nouvelle-Aquitaine
- Department: Lot-et-Garonne
- Arrondissement: Marmande
- Canton: Les Coteaux de Guyenne
- Intercommunality: Pays de Duras

Government
  - Mayor (2020–2026): Bernard Patissou
- Area^{1}: 11.42 km^{2} (4.41 sq mi)
- Elevation: 175 m (574 ft)
- Highest elevation: 175 m (574 ft)
- Lowest elevation: 42 m (138 ft)
- Population (2023): 224
  - Density: 19.6/km^{2} (50.8/sq mi)
- Time zone: UTC+01:00 (CET)
  - Summer (DST): UTC+02:00 (CEST)
- INSEE/Postal code: 47303 /47120
- ^{1} French Land Register data, which excludes lakes, ponds, glaciers > 1 km^{2} (0.386 sq mi or 247 acres) and river estuaries.

Soumensac is a commune in the Lot-et-Garonne department in south-western France.

== See also ==
- Communes of the Lot-et-Garonne department
