= Henry Augustus Lukeman =

American sculptor

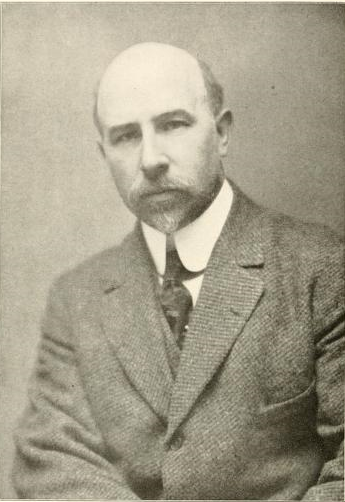
- Lukeman, c. 1914
- Born: January 28, 1871; Richmond, Virginia, U.S.
- Died: April 3, 1935 (aged 64); New York City, U.S.
- Known for: Historical monuments
- Notable work: World War I monument in Prospect Park, Brooklyn, the Kit Carson Monument in Trinidad, Colorado, and the Stone Mountain Confederate Memorial in Georgia
- Awards: Honorary Doctor of Humane Letters from Dickinson College

Henry Augustus Lukeman (January 28, 1871 – April 3, 1935) was an American sculptor, specializing in historical monuments. Noted among his works are the World War I monument in Prospect Park, Brooklyn, the Kit Carson Monument in Trinidad, Colorado and the Stone Mountain Confederate Memorial in Georgia.

== Biography ==
=== Early life and education ===
Henry Augustus Lukeman was born on January 28, 1871, in Richmond, Virginia, and was raised in New York City. He is "said to have begun lessons at the National Academy and the Cooper Union School at age eleven," though a National Academy of Design source notes that the school's "registration records do not bear… out" this historical supposition. It is also reported that he began sculpting at age 10 at a boys' club miniature workshop, working in clay and wood from ages 10 to 13.

At a young age he became a studio assistant of Launt Thompson, an Irish-American sculptor and National Academician, and, like Launt, pursued medically related studies (anatomy)—Lukeman at New York's Bellevue Hospital (for two year prior to 1890). He remained with Launt until age 16. There is report, potentially conflicting with other sources regarding his early training, that has him involved in an apprenticeship at the foundry of Jno. Williams, Inc. until he was 19. Likewise regarding a further report: that Lukeman studied terra cotta and architectural modeling for building and exterior decorations for several years, while in the evening studying life drawing (at the Cooper Union in New York). Lukeman is known to have attended classes at the National Academy for Design beginning in 1890, where records exist for his registration for the antique school (for two years), and to have followed this with study at Columbia University. Following that he went to Europe for 6 months and worked under Jean-Alexandre-Joseph Falguiere, at the Beaux Arts, in Paris.

When Lukeman returned to New York, he became an assistant to Daniel Chester French, a commitment that would last for a decade and a half, during which time he would also begin to execute his own commissions, eventually opening his own studio in New York. When construction of the World's Columbian Exposition began in 1893, Lukeman would superintend enlarging some important works for French, for instance, the Statue of the Republic.

=== American works ===
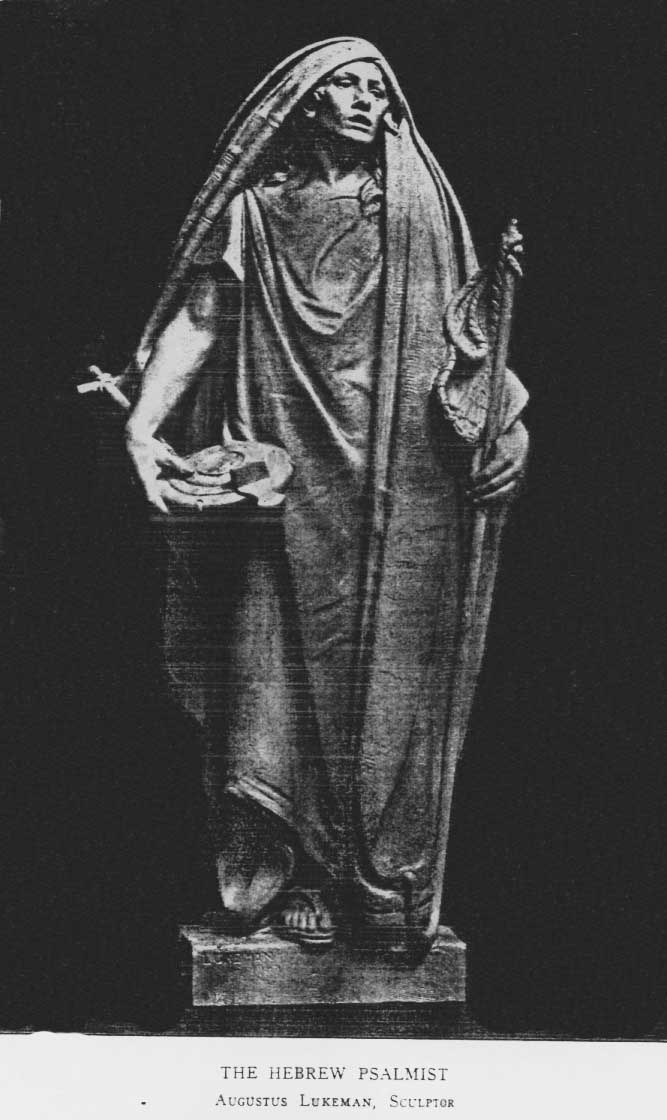
Hebrew Psalmist, on the facade of the Brooklyn Museum, New York.

Lukeman's independent work began in this new studio, and included the monuments in which he would come to specialize, as well as "portrait busts and statues, bas-reliefs, ornamental sculpture," which have been described as being "architecturally effective and often remarkable in conception." Notable works in New York state from his early independent work include figures for the Customs Building in Columbus, on the Appellate Court House in Manhattan, and on the facade of the Brooklyn Institute of Arts and Sciences. A further more complete list of his American and Canadian commissions and other important public sculpture works is given below.

A seminal work of Lukeman—proceeding from his earlier work on "several grandiose memorials"—was to complete the execution of the enormously scaled Stone Mountain Confederate Memorial. This mountain carving depicted the confederacy's president, Jefferson Davis, and Generals Robert E. Lee and Thomas J. "Stonewall" Jackson (and their respective horses Blackjack, Traveller, and Little Sorrel), in DeKalb County, Georgia, near Atlanta; there, Lukeman designed and supervised sculpting of the monument after removing the earlier work of Gutzon Borglum (the original commissionee, who had resigned). David Dearinger notes that "Lukeman was criticized for taking over another artist's work," and that "he used Borglum's existing scheme," though altering it to be a bas-relief whose figures would ultimately be over 150 feet tall.

When funding ran out in the advent of the Great Depression, Lukeman would continue to pay the craftsmen until his own means were exhausted, after which the carving would remain incomplete for decades (until Walker Hancock and Roy Faulkner completed an edited version of the Lukeman design in 1970). Located 400 feet (120 m) above ground, and lacking the originally intended legs on the horses, the Lukeman-Hancock-Faulkner sculpture ultimately measured 190 by 90 feet (58 by 27 m), and is recessed 42 feet (13 m).

Lukeman died in New York on April 3, 1935, aged 63, leaving his wife, formerly, Helen Bidwell Blodgett.

=== Honors and awards ===
Lukeman's work was recognized by the Henry Street Settlement, and he was given an honorary Doctor of Humane Letters from Dickinson College.

== Influences, and those influenced ==
Two significant influences were those whose training he extensively received, Launt Thompson and Daniel Chester French. In addition, Lukeman was known to have kept a small nude study executed by Kenyon Cox, one which "Cox considered among his best," and is therefore considered as one of Lukeman's possible artistic influences.

== Public sculptures ==
=== Dated entries ===
The following entries, whose dates of execution are known, are ordered according to date, earliest to latest:

- Manu, the Law Giver of India, 1899, on the Appellate Division Courthouse of New York State, New York City.
- Music (Festival Hall) and another decorative sculpture (Electrical Building), at the Saint Louis Exposition, 1904, Saint Louis, Missouri; awarded a medal.
- The Hebrew Law Giver, Psalmist, Apostle, and Prophet (4 figures, facade), 1907–1909, the Brooklyn Institute of Arts and Sciences, New York.
- The Straus Memorial in Straus Park, Manhattan, New York City, 1915; dedicated to Ida and Isidor Straus, who lost their lives on the RMS Titanic.
- Pulitzer Prize gold medal (with Daniel Chester French), 1918.
- The Prospect Park Memorial, 1921, a World War I monument, in Prospect Park, Brooklyn.
- Major General David McMurtrie Gregg, 1922, Reading, Pennsylvania.
- The Soldiers and Sailors Monument, 1923, Pittsfield, Massachusetts; refurbished, with presentation, Memorial Day 2010.
- Stone Mountain Confederate Memorial, DeKalb County, Georgia, near Atlanta, 1925–1928; preceded in this project by Gutzon Borglum, and followed by Walker Hancock.

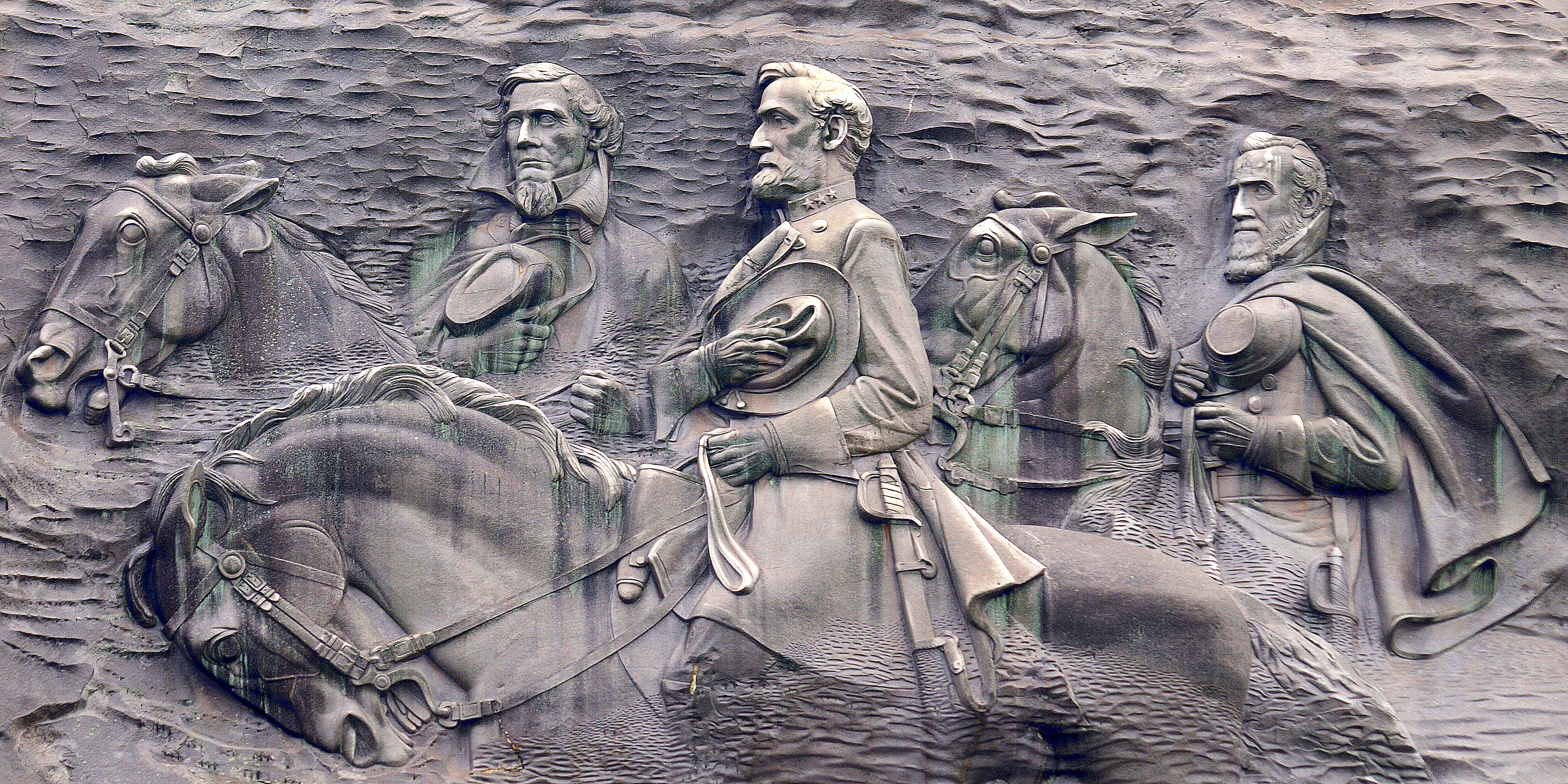
Confederate Memorial Carving, Stone Mountain, as executed by Lukeman, Walker Hancock, and Roy Faulkner.

Fuller E. Callaway, 1929, textile magnate portrait bust, Hills & Dales Estate, LaGrange, Georgia

=== Undated entries ===
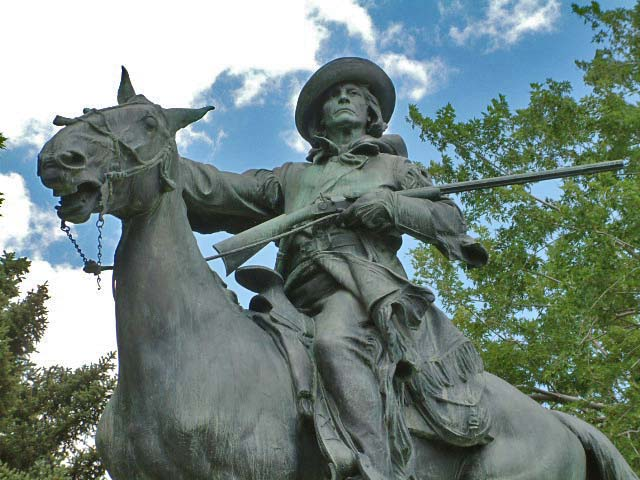
Kit Carson equestrian statue, Trinidad, Colorado (with Frederick Roth).

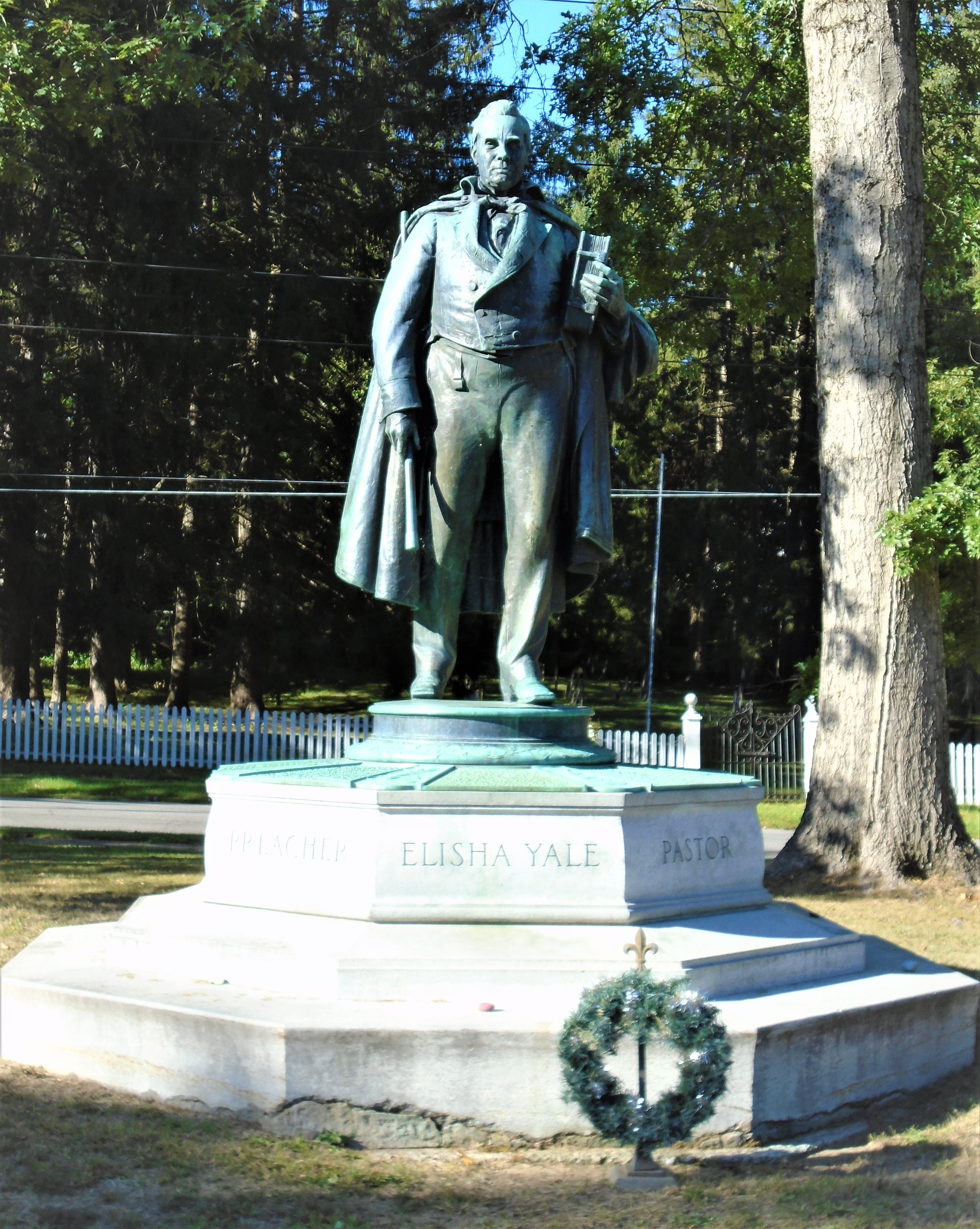
Statue of Rev. Elisha Yale in Gloversville, NY

The following entries, whose dates of execution are unknown, are ordered alphabetically by the subjects surname or place name:

- Francis Asbury Equestrian Sculpture, Washington, D.C.
- Francis Asbury Statue, Madison, New Jersey.
- Daniel Boone bas-relief portrait, Paris, Kentucky.
- Kit Carson Monument in Trinidad, Colorado; figure of Carson; sculptor Frederick Roth executed the horse.
- Lieutenant Cushing, on the Dewey Arch, New York, New York.
- Customs Building, Columbus, New York.
- Ulysses S. Grant Memorial, San Diego, California.
- Joseph Henry, professor, Princeton University, Princeton, New Jersey.
- Robert Livingston, Saint Louis, Michigan.
- President William McKinley Statue, Adams, Massachusetts.
- President William McKinley Statue, Toledo, Ohio.
- Memorial to the Women of the Confederacy, Raleigh, North Carolina.
- National Sculpture Society Seal.
- Pan-American Exposition sculpture, in Buffalo, New York.
- James K. Patterson, early president of the University of Kentucky, Lexington, Kentucky.
- President Franklin Pierce, New Hampshire State Capitol, Concord, New Hampshire.
- Royal Bank of Canada headquarters, four colossal statues, Montreal, Quebec, Canada.
- General William Shepard, Westfield, Massachusetts. Dedicated Sept. 3, 1919 Pucumtuck Valley Memorial Assn.
- Soldiers and Sailors Monument, Public Square, Watertown, New York.
- Soldiers' Monument, Somerville, Massachusetts.
- Elisha Yale, at Gloversville, New York.
