= Richard Weil =

Richard Weil may refer to:

- Richard Weil (footballer)
- Richard Weil (physician)
