= Robert K. Straus =

American publisher and politician

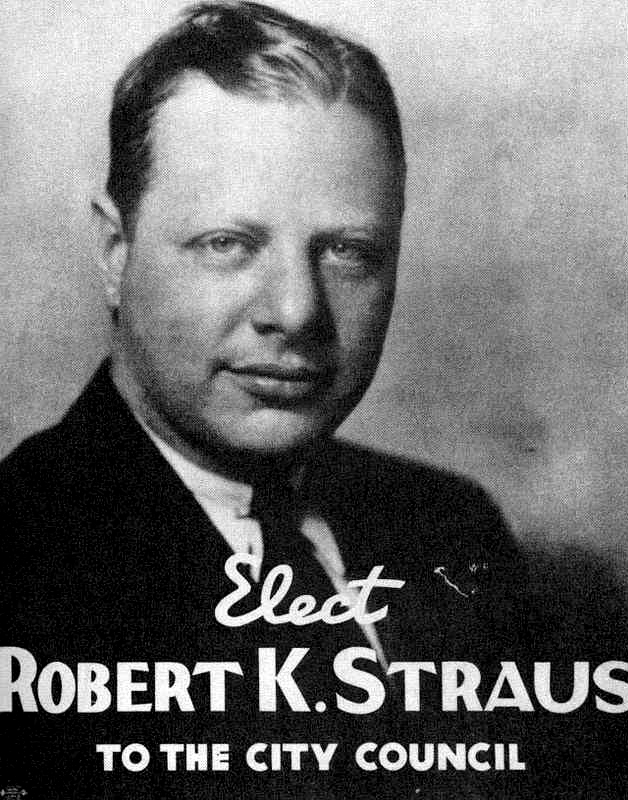
- Campaign poster, 1937

Member of the New York City Council from Manhattan At-Large
- In office January 1, 1938 – December 31, 1941
- Preceded by: Constituency established
- Succeeded by: Multi-member district

Personal details
- Born: October 22, 1905 New York City, U.S.
- Died: February 24, 1997 (aged 91) Santa Barbara, California, U.S.
- Resting place: Santa Barbara Cemetery
- Party: Democratic; City Fusion
- Spouse: Barbara Flower (m. 1947)
- Children: 2
- Parents: Jesse Isidor Straus (father); Irma Nathan (mother)
- Relatives: Straus family
- Education: Harvard Business School (A.B.)
- Occupation: Newspaper publisher, politician

Robert Kenneth Straus (October 22, 1905 – February 24, 1997) was an American newspaper publisher and politician who served on the New York City Council from 1938 to 1941, representing Manhattan. He bought the San Fernando Valley Sun in 1958 and founded Sun Litho Inc., a commercial printer.

== Biography ==
Robert Kenneth Straus was born on October 22, 1905, in New York City to Jesse and Irma Straus. He was a member of the Straus political family; his grandfather was Congressman and Titanic victim Isidor Straus, and his great uncles were department store owner Nathan Straus and diplomat Oscar Straus.

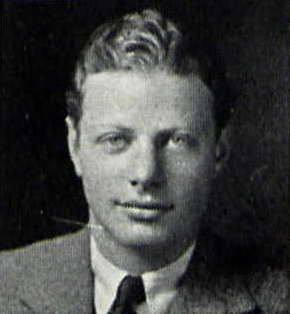
Straus's Harvard Business School yearbook photo, 1931

Straus attended Harvard Business School and graduated in 1931 with an A.B. in government and economics. He worked for Franklin D. Roosevelt as governor and president, helping to run the National Recovery Administration.

Shortly after his father's death, Straus ran for a seat on the newly-formed New York City Council in 1937. Running as a member of the City Fusion Party, his campaign committee was headed by Adolf A. Berle and he was supported by mayor Fiorello La Guardia, the American Labor Party, and judge Samuel Seabury's Citizens Non-Partisan Committee. During the campaign, Straus was an enthusiastic advocate for the new proportional representation system, educating voters on how it worked. He was ultimately elected with 65,177 votes, after shifts. He was re-elected in 1939, but was defeated in 1941.

During World War II, Straus worked at the Allied Force Headquarters in the United Kingdom as a government affairs specialist. In 1958, he moved his family to San Francisco, California, bought the San Fernando Valley Sun, and founded Sun Litho Inc. Sun Litho began by publishing small newspapers in California and was one of the first commercial printing companies to use phototypesetting and web offset printing to produce catalogs and other business materials.

Inspired by the teachings of Alfred Korzybski, Straus became a proponent of general semantics and advocated for its inclusion into the curriculum of Pace University. In 1985, he founded the Barbara and Robert K. Straus Thinking and Learning Center on Pace's Manhattan campus. He was an officer of the Institute of General Semantics.

Straus died on February 24, 1997, at St. Francis Hospital in Santa Barbara, California.
