= San Fernando Valley Sun =

Newspaper published in San Fernando, California

- Type: Weekly newspaper
- Owner: Sev Aszkenazy
- Founder: Herbert W. Brooks
- Publisher: Martha Diaz Aszkenazy
- Founded: 1904
- Language: English, Spanish
- Headquarters: San Fernando, California, U.S.
- Website: sanfernandosun.com

The San Fernando Valley Sun is a newspaper published in San Fernando, California, a city enclave fully surrounded by neighborhoods incorporated in the northernmost portion of Los Angeles. The newspaper is named for the entire San Fernando Valley, which includes these portions of Los Angeles, as well as the city of Burbank to the southeast.

== History ==
In April 1904, The Fernando Press was first published by Herbert W. Brooks. In December 1911, Brooks sold the Press to A.D. Shaffmaster. In December 1918, Arthur G. Munn bought the paper.

In April 1922, Munn leased the Press to R.H. Glenn. That November, Glenn bought the paper and renamed it to the San Fernando Valley Sun. In April 1926, the Sun absorbed a rival paper called the San Fernando Valley Leader, and then expanded from a weekly to a semiweekly and switched from postal to carrier delivery. The merger was done after his brother L.A. Glenn and K.K. Hooper bought into the business.

In May 1927, A.E. Snider and J. Arthur Browning bought the paper from the Glenn brothers and Hooper. Snider disposed of his interests in September 1940 to serve fulltime at the California Department of Finance. The paper was acquired by former Chula Vista Star owner L.L. "Larry" Thompson in June 1944, father-and-son William L. Odett and Lamont Odett in December 1945, and Stanley S. Mead and his associates in October 1946.

In November 1947, the paper was expanded from a weekly into a daily. In January 1948, Mead and Warren S. Guy sold the Sun to Lawrence A. Copeland and James W. Metcale. A month later the paper was reverted back to a weekly. That December, Metcale sold his stake to Niver W. Beaman and Arthur F. Folz.

In 1957, Simon Casady, publisher of El Cajon Valley News, and Robert K. Straus, an heir to the Macy's fortune, bought the San Fernando Valley Sun and Reporter from Copeland and Folz. The sale included the Granda Hills Outlook, Pacoima Post and Sun Printing Co. In 1969, Copeland died. Michael J. Flannery became the paper's owner at some point.

In 1981, Hearst Corporation bought the Sun from Flannery. In 1985, Hearst sold the Sun, along with the Valley Scene, Valley View and Record-Ledger, to Thelma Barrios. At that time the Sun had a circulation of 42,000. Barrios previously worked at the Sun until she started a rival paper called The Independent, which she merged into the Sun following the sale. By 1994, the paper's circulation was 10,000.

In 2001, the Sun was purchased by Sev Aszkenazy, a real estate developer, and his wife, Martha Diaz Aszkenazy, a businesswoman. On October 8, 2004, Congressman Howard Berman gave a brief speech to highlight the one-hundred anniversary of the newspaper. In 2006, former owner Flannery died.

== Controversy ==
Mario Hernandez, former mayor of San Fernando, contended that developer Sev Aszkenazy used his publication that he owns, the San Fernando Sun, to stoke controversies in retaliation for how officials did not give him what wanted on his development projects. Hernandez said that he uses the publication to influence public opinion to his advantage.

San Fernando community members argued that Aszkenazy newspaper reporting is biased and has sought to retaliate for how his proposals for construction work were rejected. Aszkenazy was accused of using his publication to bully others.
