= Alfred Fabian Hess =

American physician (1875–1933)

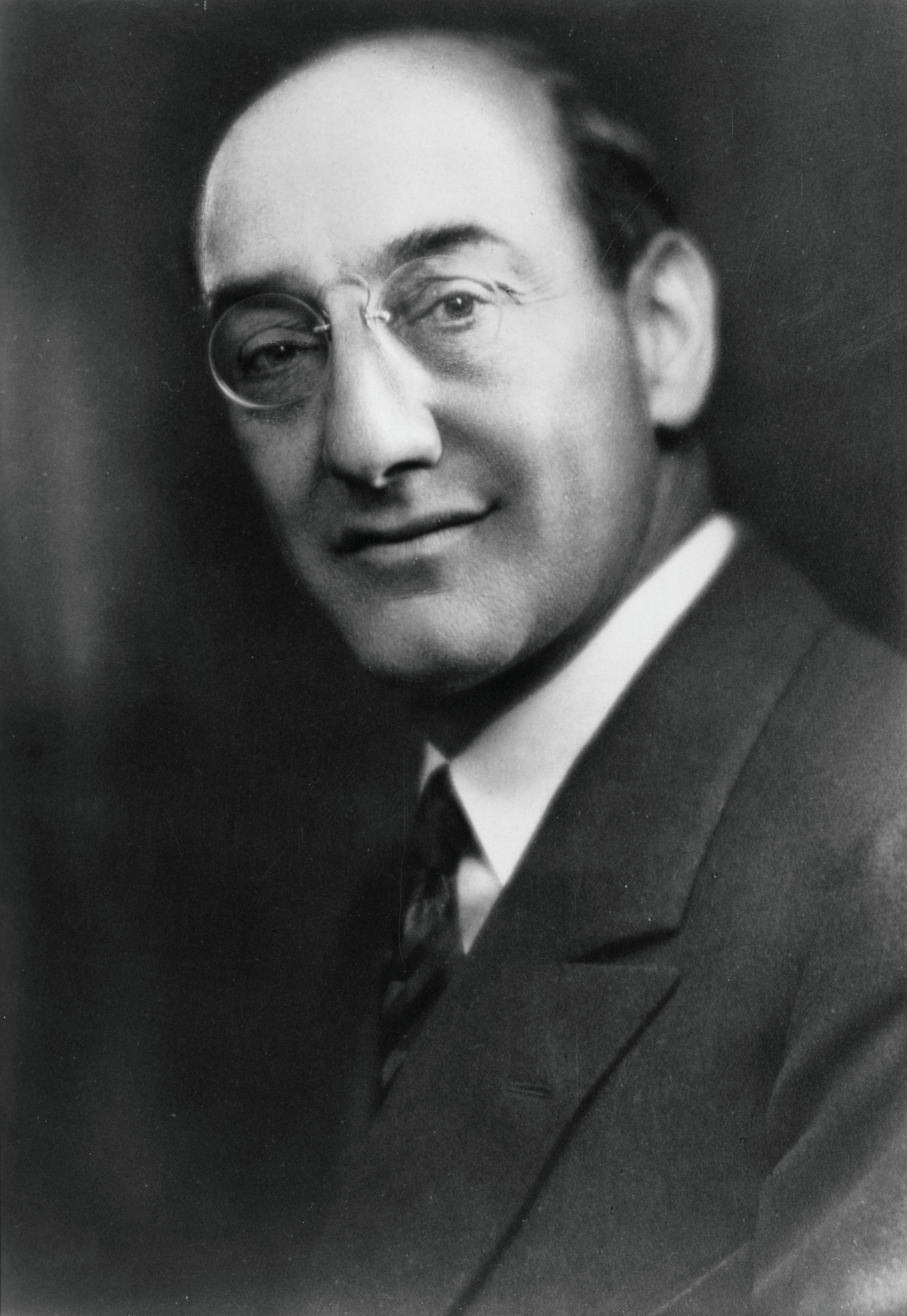
Hess c. 1933

Alfred Fabian Hess (9 October 1875, in New York City – 5 December 1933) was an American physician known for his work on the role of nutrition in scurvy and rickets and for describing the Hess test.

== Early life and education ==
Hess was born on October 15, 1875, to a Jewish family, the son of Josephine (née Solomon) and Selmar Hess. He graduated from Harvard University in 1897 and received his M.D. from the Columbia University College of Physicians and Surgeons in 1901. He worked as an intern at Mount Sinai Hospital, New York, for two and a half years, and spent a year studying in Prague, Vienna and Berlin before starting practice in New York in 1905.

== Medical and research career ==
He worked as a pediatrician at the Rockefeller University before going into private practice. He also worked at the Beth Israel Hospital, New York, and at the Hebrew Infant Asylum in New York, modernising the institution. He was able to study nutrition in patients who were admitted for long periods in those hospitals.

Hess suggested that rubella was caused by a virus in 1914.

He showed that the missing factor in scurvy was present in citrus fruits and tomatoes, also demonstrating that some dried milk preparations were anti-scorbutic and that pasteurization reduced this effect in fresh milk. Along with Mildred Fish, he conducted studies between 1914 and 1920 to elucidate the etiology of scurvey by withholding orange juice from institutionalized infants until they developed hemorrhages as a result of the disease; he conducted similar studies to elucidate the etiology of rickets. His work led him to state that the process of food manufacture and preservation should aim to preserve the nutritional value of fresh food in his 1921 Harvey lecture, a concept widely recognised today. His experiments on institutionalized infants were later criticized as unethical.

He determined that rickets could be prevented with cod liver oil or exposure to ultraviolet light, and that certain foods could be used to treat rickets after exposure to ultraviolet light. He ascertained that cholesterol or a closely related compound also behaved in the same way, and he worked with Adolf Otto Reinhold Windaus and published a paper with Windaus in 1927 entitled Development of marked activity in ergosterol following ultraviolet irradiations, showing that rickets could be prevented in rats with irradiated ergosterol. Windaus was awarded the Nobel Prize in chemistry for this work in 1928. Windaus gave Hess credit for his part in the work, and shared the Nobel Prize money with him.

Hess was a member of the American Pediatric Society and the Association of American Physicians, and was awarded an honorary Doctor of Science degree by the University of Michigan. He was given the John Scott Award by the Franklin Institute in 1927, and the John Mather Smith Award in 1931. That same year, he was elected to the American Philosophical Society.

== Personal life ==
Hess was married to Sara Straus, daughter of Ida and Isidor Straus. They had three children. He continued to work despite warnings by his doctor about his hypertension. He collapsed in his car and died after speaking at a graduation ceremony on 5 December 1933. His friends included Abraham Flexner and Edwards Amasa Park, who helped to publish Hess's works posthumously.
