= Equestrian statue of David McMurtrie Gregg =

Major General David McMurtrie Gregg
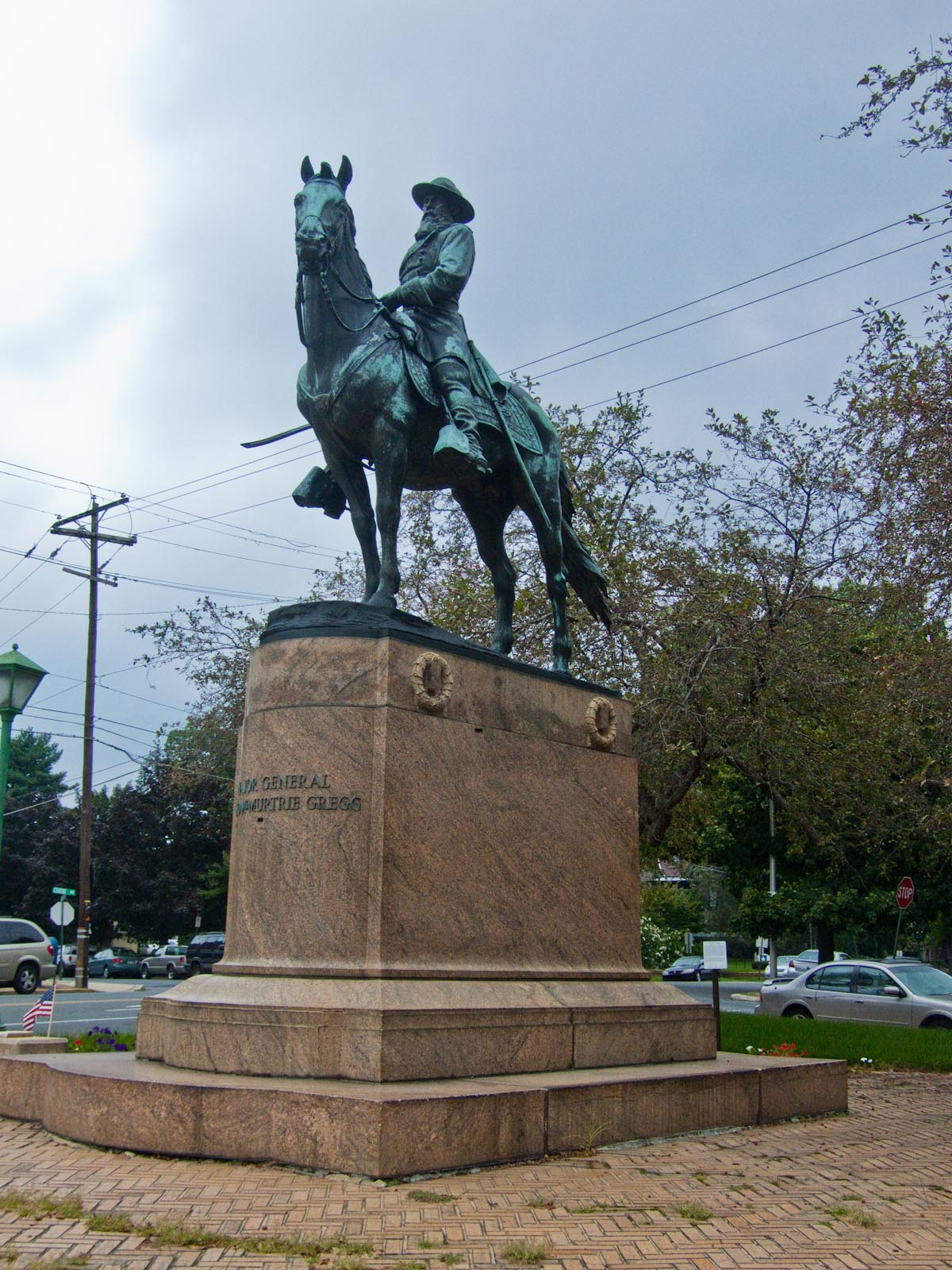
- The monument in 2011
- Location: Centre Park, Reading, Pennsylvania, United States
- Coordinates: 40°20′45″N 75°55′47″W
- Designer: Henry Augustus Lukeman
- Type: Equestrian statue
- Material: Bronze, Granite
- Length: 14.5 feet (4.4 m)
- Width: 9 feet (2.7 m)
- Height: 19.5 feet (5.9 m)
- Dedicated date: June 17, 1922
- Dedicated to: David McMurtrie Gregg

Major General David McMurtrie Gregg is a monumental statue located in Reading, Pennsylvania, United States. The monument was designed by Henry Augustus Lukeman and consists of an equestrian statue depicting David McMurtrie Gregg, a military officer who had served in the Union Army during the American Civil War. The monument was dedicated in 1922, several years after Gregg's death in Reading in 1916.

== History ==
David McMurtrie Gregg was born in Huntingdon, Pennsylvania, in 1833. He attended and graduated from the United States Military Academy and served as an officer in the Union Army during the American Civil War. During the war, he attained the rank of Major General and was involved in many battles involving the Army of the Potomac. During the Battle of Gettysburg, he distinguished himself by leading cavalry forces that helped the Union win the battle. He resigned in 1865, following which he lived in Reading, Pennsylvania, where he led an active civic life. He died on August 7, 1916, in Reading.

Following his death, a monument was erected in his honor in Reading. The monument, which consisted of an equestrian statue of Gregg, was designed by sculptor Henry Augustus Lukeman of New York City. The monument, one of several in the city, would be located in the city's Centre Park, at the triangular intersection of Centre Avenue, Fourth Street, and Olney Street. It was dedicated on June 17, 1922, with a parade held as part of the dedication ceremonies.

In 1994, the monument was surveyed as part of the Save Outdoor Sculpture! project. Around August 1995, over 70 years after its dedication, the monument was restored and rededicated.

== Design ==
The monument consists of an equestrian statue of Gregg atop a pedestal. The statue is bronze, while the pedestal is polished pink granite. The sculpture stands approximately 11 feet (3.4 m) tall and has side measurements of 11 feet (3.4 m) by 4.5 feet (1.4 m), while the pedestal is 8.5 feet (2.6 m) tall and has side measurements of 9 feet (2.7 m) by 14.5 feet (4.4 m). Gregg is depicted in his military attire, with a saber in his right hand and the horse's reins in his left. An inscription on the rear of the sculpture's base reads "AUGUSTUS LUKEMAN 1922". The pedestal has two steps near its base and is surrounded by a brick plaza.

The front of the pedestal bears the following in bronze letters: "MAJOR GENERAL / DAVID MCMURTRIE GREGG". An inscription on the rear of the pedestal reads, "GETTYSBURG / 1863 Erected by / The Commonwealth of Pennsylvania", while a bronze plaque affixed to a side of the pedestal reads, "State Commission / Ira Stratton, Chmn / Daniel K. Hoch, Sec / Wellington M. Bertolet / Isaac Hiester / Richmond L. Jones / Eli M. Rapp / William M. Fleckman". Another plaque located about 15 feet (4.6 m) in front of the monument says, "MAJOR GENERAL DAVID MCMURTRIE GREGG / COMMANDER UNION CAVALRY, WHOSE / ACHIEVEMENTS CONTRIBUTED SO LARGELY TO SUCCESS AND ULTIMATE / VICTORY AT GETTYSBURG JULY 1863 / TURNING THE TIDE OF THE WAR. / AN UPRIGHT CHRISTIAN GENTLEMAN / A LOYAL CITIZEN; A STAUNCH DEFENDER / OF THE CONSTITUTION / AN EARNEST ADVOCATE OF PEACE."

== See also ==
- List of equestrian statues in the United States

== Sources ==
- Archambault, A. Margaretta, ed. (1924). A Guide Book of Art, Architecture, and Historic Interests in Pennsylvania. Philadelphia: John C. Winston Company. LCCN 25002577.
- Croll, P. C. (1926). Conrad Weiser and His Memorial Park: A Little History in Three Parts. Reading, Pennsylvania: Reading Eagle Press. LCCN 52054734. OCLC 62610762.
- Ferree, Barr, ed. (1923). Year Book of the Pennsylvania Society. New York City: The Pennsylvania Society. ISSN 1933-9445. LCCN 02011608. OCLC 476082813.
- Longacre, Edward G. (2021). Unsung Hero of Gettysburg: The Story of Union General David McMurtrie Gregg. Lincoln, Nebraska: Potomac Books. ISBN 978-1-64012-458-5. LCCN 2020038266. OCLC 1242106995.
- "Major General David McMurtrie Gregg, (sculpture)". Smithsonian Institution Research Information System. Archived from the original on March 24, 2022.
