= Monument to North Carolina Women of the Confederacy =

Monument in Raleigh, North Carolina, U.S.

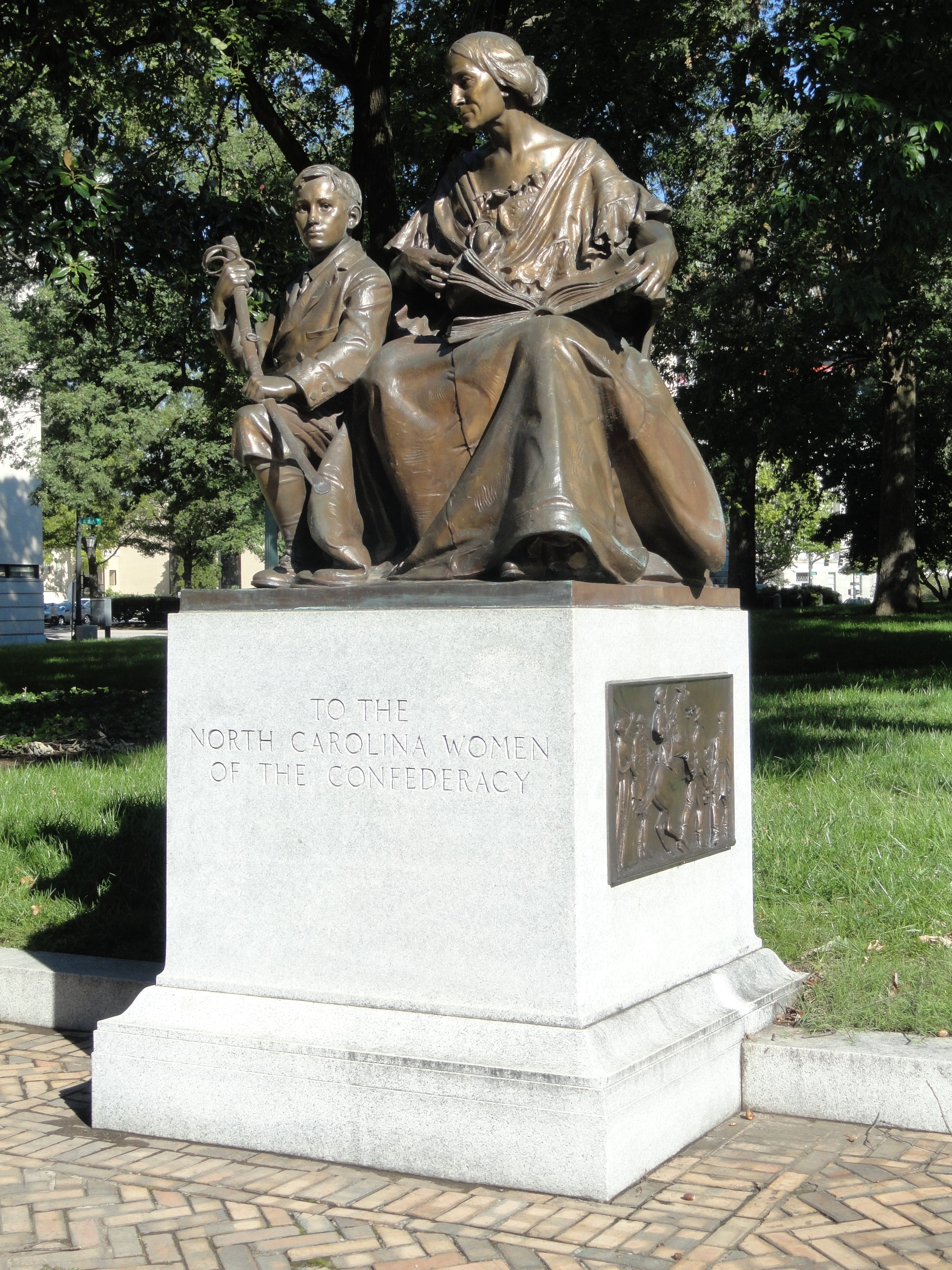
- The monument in 2011
- Artist: Augustus Lukeman
- Year: 1914
- Condition: Removed (June 2020)
- Location: Raleigh, North Carolina, U.S.; 35.77974°N 78.63964°W

The Monument to North Carolina Women of the Confederacy was installed in Raleigh, North Carolina, United States in 1914. It was designed by Augustus Lukeman. It was located in the surrounds of the North Carolina State Capitol, until its removal on June 21, 2020, during the protests following the murder of George Floyd.

== See also ==
- List of monuments and memorials removed during the George Floyd protests
