= Ida Straus =

Titanic passenger (1849–1912)

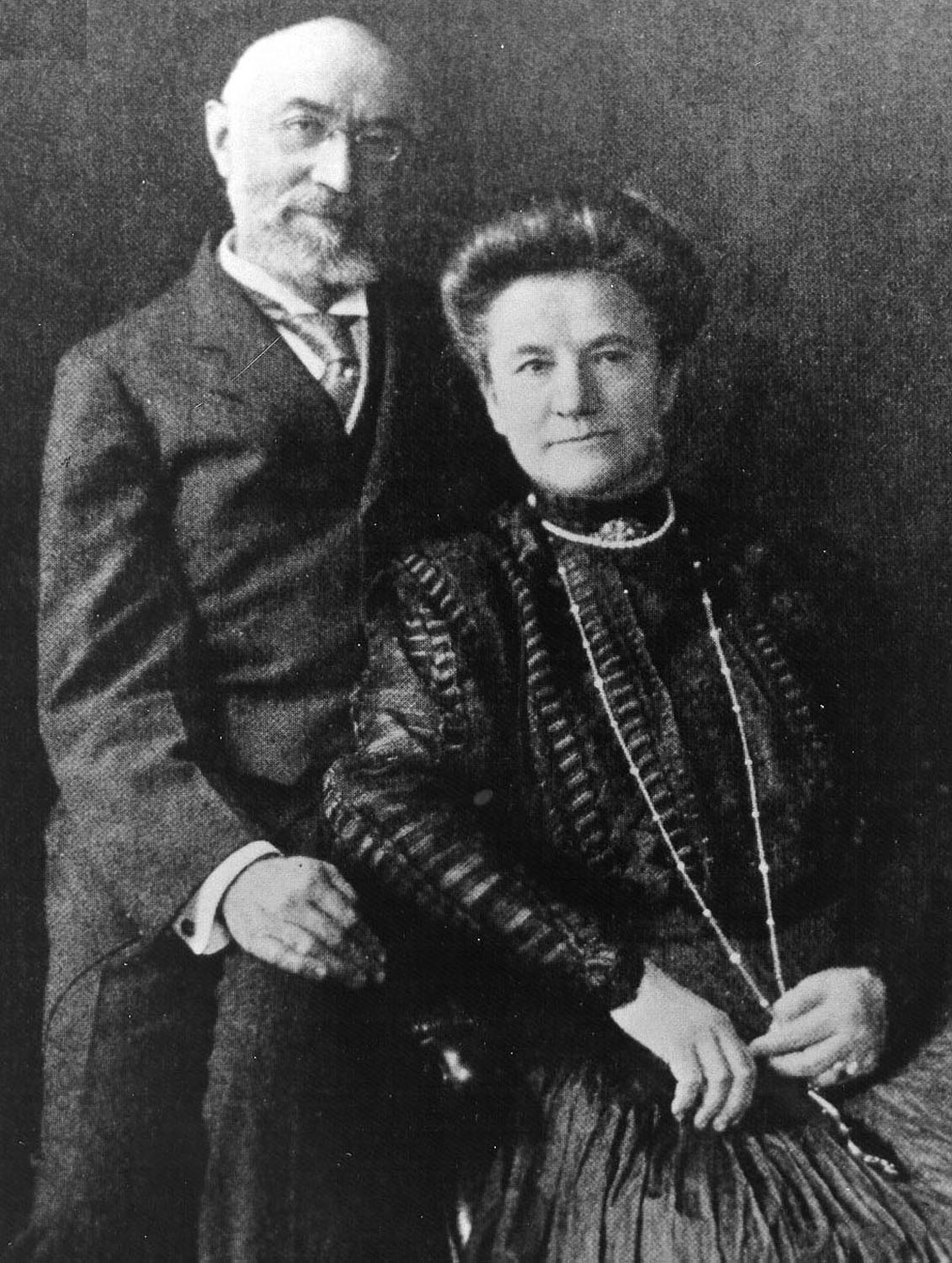
- Straus with her husband Isidor
- Born: Rosalie Ida Blun; February 6, 1849; Worms, Grand Duchy of Hesse
- Died: April 15, 1912 (aged 63); North Atlantic Ocean
- Spouse: Isidor Straus (m. 1871)
- Children: 7, including Jesse
- Relatives: Straus family

Rosalie Ida Straus (née Blün; February 6, 1849 – April 15, 1912) was a German-born American socialite, who was the wife of Isidor Straus, U.S. congressman and co-founder of the Macy's department store.

Straus became famous for refusing to take a seat in the Titanic's lifeboats despite the "Women and children first" rule permitting her a place, as she refused to be parted from her husband. She died in the sinking, one of only four first-class women to not survive, and her body, if recovered, was never identified.

== Early life and relations ==
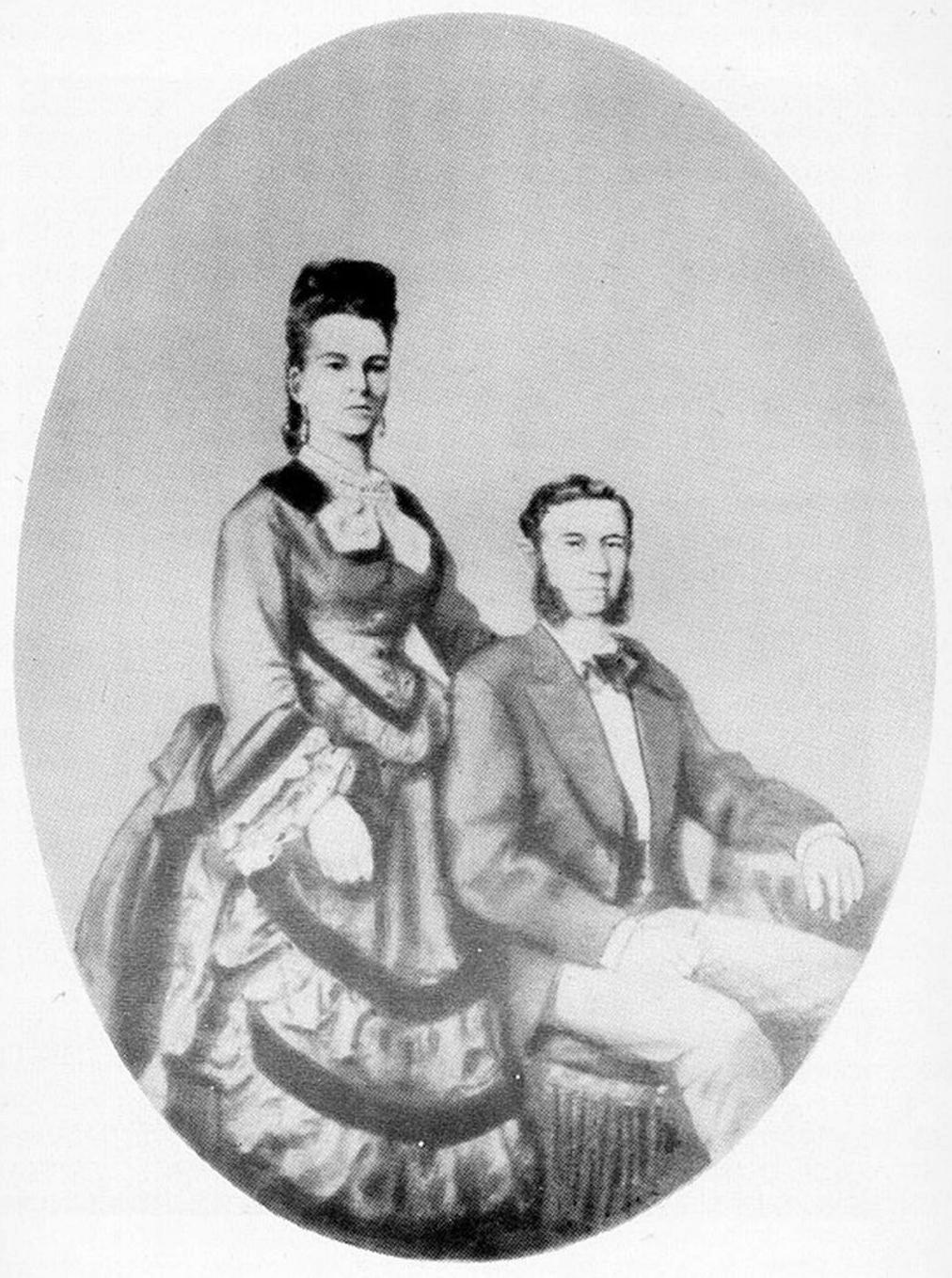
Wedding photo of the Strauses, in 1871

Rosalie Ida Blun was born in 1849 into a Jewish family in Worms to Nathan Blün and his wife Wilhelmine "Mindel" (née Freudenberg). She was the fifth of seven children. She emigrated to the United States with her family in 1850.

In 1871, Ida Blun married Isidor Straus, a German-Jewish American businessman. The couple was considered especially close by their friends and family. When Isidor traveled as part of his duties as a U.S. Representative for New York, or as co-owner of Macy's, they exchanged letters daily. She and Isidor had seven children:

- Jesse Isidor Straus (1872–1936), who married Irma Nathan and served as U.S. Ambassador to France, 1933–1936
- Clarence Elias Straus (1874–1876), who died in infancy
- Percy Selden Straus (1876–1944), who married Edith Abraham (1882–1957)
- Sara Straus (1878–1960) who married Alfred Fabian Hess (1875–1933)
- Minnie Straus (1880–1940) who married Richard Weil
- Herbert Nathan Straus (1881–1933), who married Therese Kuhnt
- Vivian Straus (1886–1974) first married Herbert Adolph Scheftel and second, in 1917, married George A. Dixon Jr.

Among her great-great-granddaughters are singer Mikaela Mullaney Straus, known by her stage name King Princess, and Wendy Rush (née Weil), the widow of Stockton Rush who founded the deep-sea tourism company OceanGate and lost his life on a dive in a submersible in 2023 to the wreck of the Titanic.

== Death on the Titanic ==
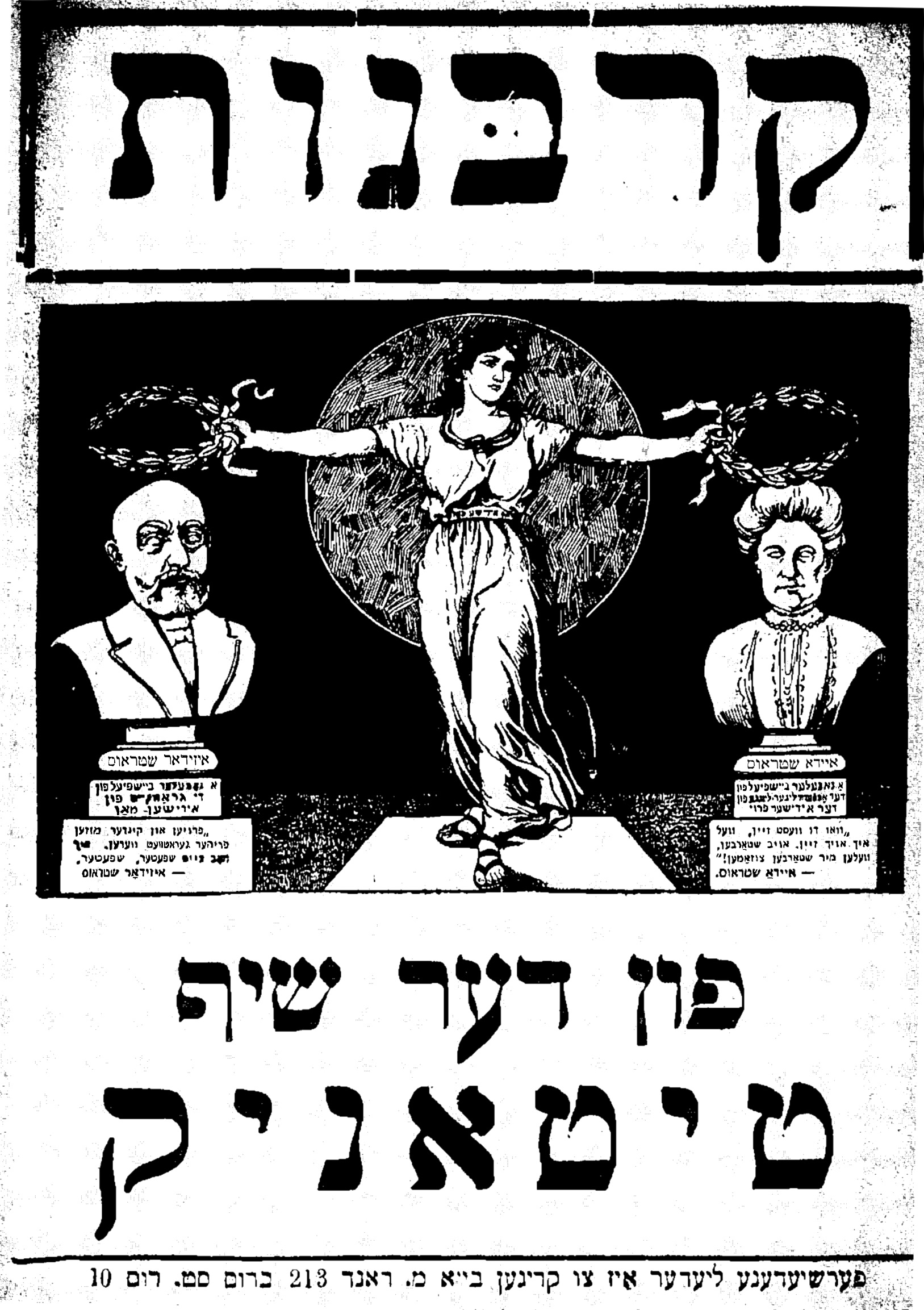
Isidor and Ida Straus statues being blessed by an angel, "Victims of the Ship Titanic", Yiddish penny song

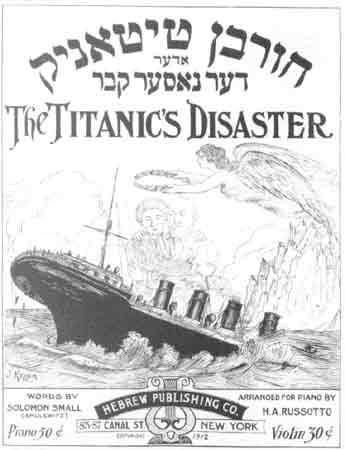
The Titanic's Disaster: or, The Watery Grave, published in 1912

Ida spent the winter of 1911/1912 in Europe with her husband, Isidor. They originally planned to return home on a different ship, but switched to the RMS Titanic due to a coal strike in England that caused the coal from other ships to be diverted to the Titanic.

On the night of the sinking, Isidor and Ida were seen standing near Lifeboat No. 8 in the company of Ida's maid, Ellen Bird. Isidor Straus had urged Ida to board, but she refused attempts by both the officers and her husband to persuade her to get in, saying, "We have lived together for many years. Where you go, I go." This incident was witnessed by numerous witnesses both in the lifeboat and on deck. Ida instead gave her coat to her maid, who instead took Straus' place in the lifeboat. Ida ended up perishing in the disaster, along with her husband; she was one of only four first-class women to die.

The story of Ida's bravery and loyalty became much celebrated. Rabbis spoke to their congregations about her sacrifice; articles in Yiddish- and German-language newspapers extolled her courage; a popular song featuring the story, "The Titanic's Disaster", became popular among Jewish Americans.

== Legacy ==
A cenotaph at the Straus Mausoleum at Woodlawn Cemetery in the Bronx is dedicated to Isidor and Ida together. The work was designed by James Gamble Rogers, with sculpture by Lee Lawrie.

=== Memorials ===
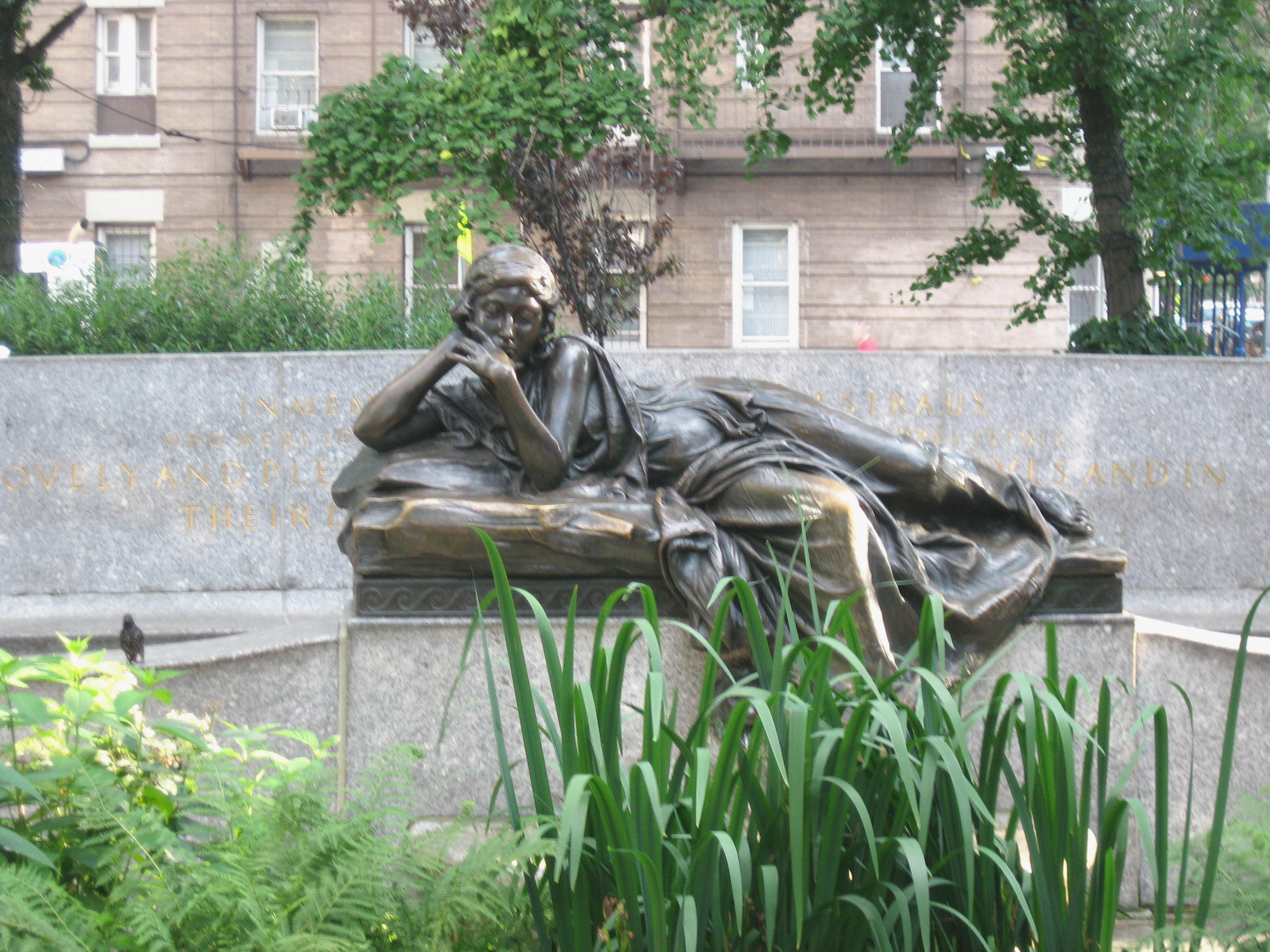
106th Street memorial, Straus Park, Manhattan

In addition to the cenotaph at Woodlawn Cemetery, there are three other memorials to Isidor and Ida Straus in their adopted home of New York City:

- The 34th Street main entrance to Macy's Department Store in Manhattan features two brass plaques — one commemorating the deaths of Ida and Isidor Straus, the other honoring employees who died in World War I.
- The Isidor and Ida Straus Memorial is located in Straus Park at the intersection of Broadway and West End Avenue at W. 106th Street (Duke Ellington Boulevard) in Manhattan.
- New York City public school P.S. 198 is the Isidor & Ida Straus School.

=== Portrayals ===
- Helen Van Tuyl (1953) Titanic
- Olive Blakeney (1955) (You Are There: The Sinking of the Titanic (TV episode, 22 May 1955)
- Helen Misener (1958) A Night to Remember (British film)
- Nancy Nevinson (1979) S.O.S. Titanic (TV Movie)
- Pamela Munro (1994) Titanic: The Complete Story (Documentary)
- Janie Woods-Morris (1996) Titanic (TV miniseries)
- Elsa Raven (1997) Titanic
- Alma Cuervo (1997) Titanic (Broadway musical)
- Inge Campbell (1998) Titanic: Secrets Revealed (TV documentary)
- Patty Noblett (2017) - Titanic: Sinking the Myths (Docudrama)
- Annie Kitral (2024) - Unsinkable
