= Richard Weil (physician) =

American physician and researcher (1876–1917)

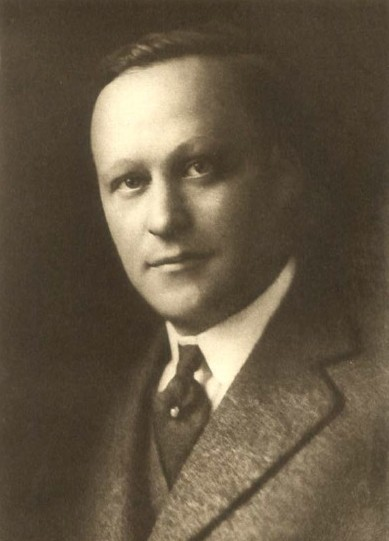
- Born: October 15, 1876; New York City, New York, U.S.
- Died: November 19, 1917 (aged 41); Macon, Georgia
- Education: Columbia College
- Known for: Development of anti-coagulants
- Spouse: Minnie Straus (m. 1904–)
- Relatives: Isidor Straus (father-in-law); Pat de Groot (granddaughter); Stockton Rush (great-grandson-in-law)
- Scientific career
- Fields: Cancer research, hematology
- Workplaces: Cornell University Medical College; Mt. Sinai Hospital; Montefiore Medical Center; General Memorial Hospital

Richard Weil (October 15, 1876 – November 19, 1917) was an American physician and cancer researcher.

== Early life and education ==
Weil was the son of Leopold Weil and Martha Tanzer. A native of New York City, he graduated from Columbia College in 1896, before completing his MD degree at Columbia in 1900. After completing his residency at the German Hospital in Manhattan, he went to Europe to pursue postgraduate research at Vienna and Strasbourg.

== Medical career ==
Weil served as part of the medical staff of numerous hospitals, including the German Hospital, Montefiore, Mt. Sinai, and General Memorial. He joined the staff of Cornell University Medical College in 1905, receiving a faculty appointment in 1911, and becoming the chair of the Department of Experimental Medicine in 1916.

Weil's primary research interest was cancer. He was part of the staff of the Huntingdon Fund for Cancer Research from 1906 until his death. He initiated investigations into the reactions of cancer and immune sera, which thereafter became his principal research interest. His early studies focused on the hemolytic and antitryptic properties of cancer serum. Another one of his major medical contributions was the demonstration that blood treated with anti-coagulants could be refrigerated, which ultimately led to the establishment of blood banks. One of his articles on anaphylaxis was the first article to be published in the Journal of Immunology. He was a councilor of the American Association for Cancer Research in 1914, and president of the American Association of Immunologists in 1916–17. At the request of the American Association for Cancer Research Council, Weil was charged with establishing the Journal of Cancer Research. He oversaw its launch and became its first managing editor.

== Personal life ==
Weil married Minnie Straus, daughter of Isidor and Ida Straus, on May 30, 1905, at Sunnyside, the Straus family's summer home in Elberon, New Jersey. They had three children: Evelyn, Richard, and Frederick Peter. His son Richard Jr. was president of Macy's.

== Military service and death ==
With the American entry into World War I, Weil joined the military. After training at Fort Benjamin Harrison, he was detailed as the chief of medical staff at Camp Wheeler. He held this position only a short time, as he contracted pneumonia and died on November 19, 1917.
