= Straus Park =

Public park in Manhattan, New York

Coordinates: 40°48′06.5″N 73°58′05.5″W

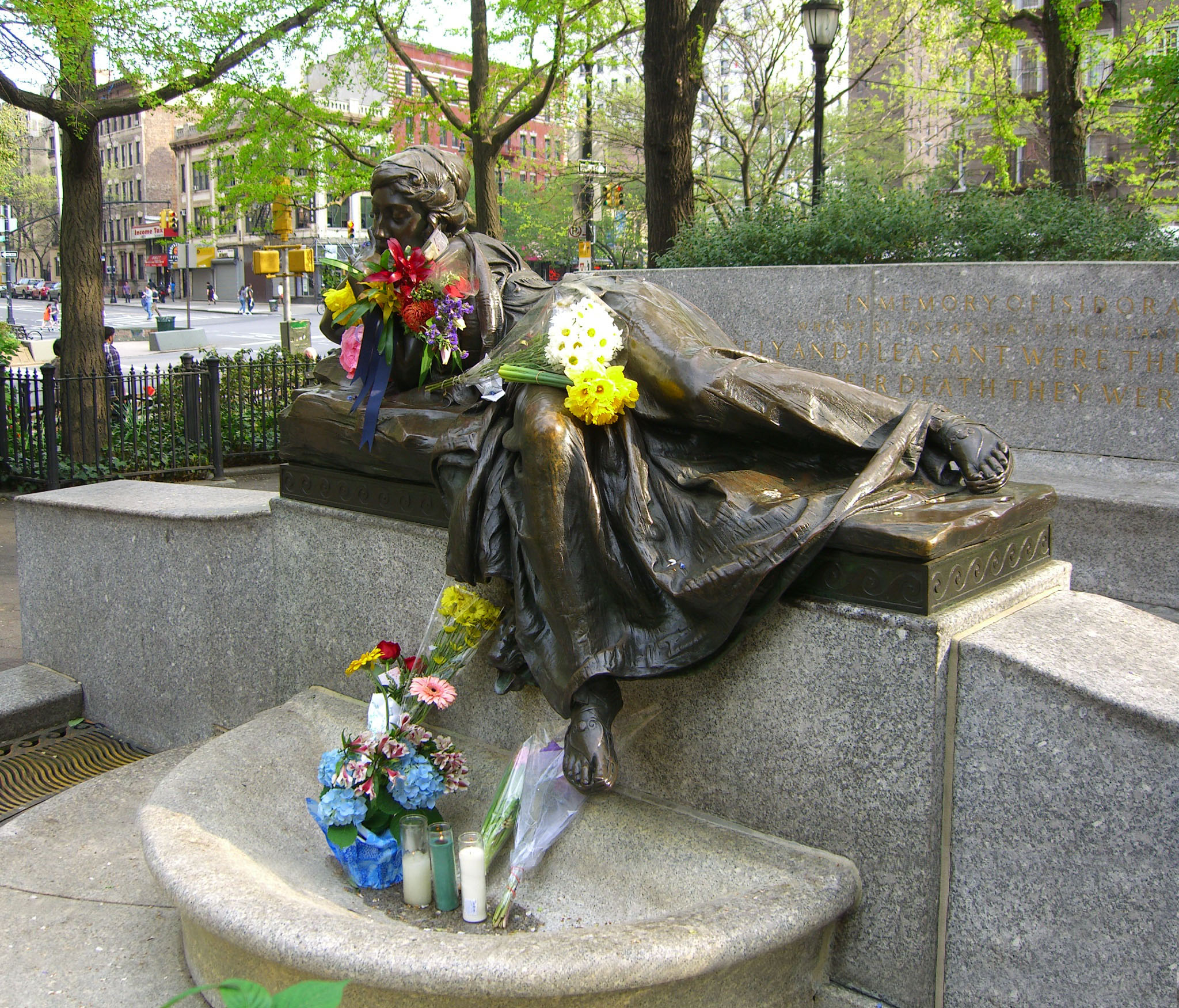
Flowers and candles adorn the Isidor and Ida Straus Memorial on April 15, 2012, the 100th anniversary of the sinking of the Titanic.

Straus Park is a small landscaped park on the Upper West Side of Manhattan, at the intersection of Broadway, West End Avenue, and 106th Street.

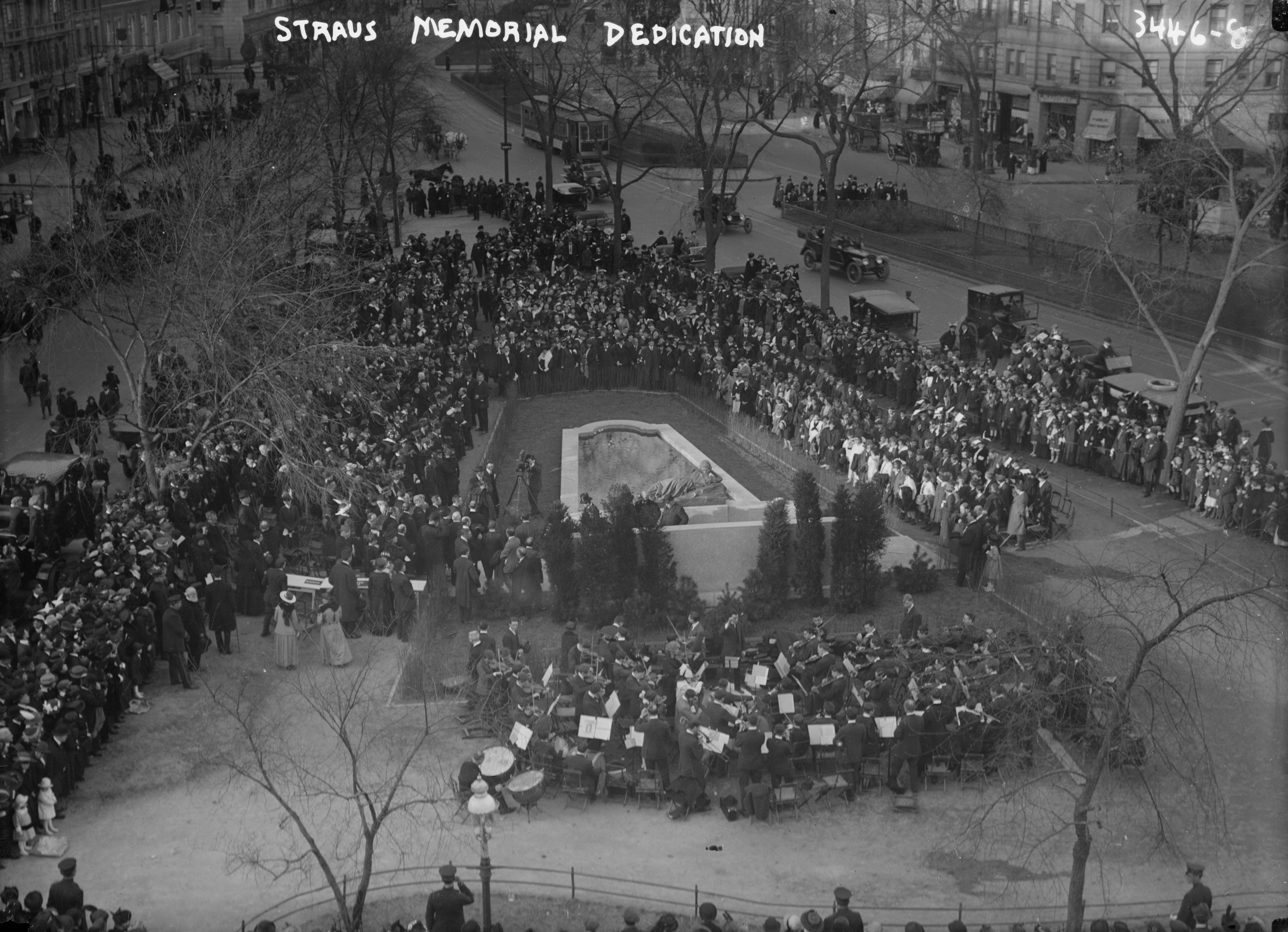
Dedication of Straus Memorial, April 15, 1915

The most notable feature is a bronze 1913 statue by American artist Augustus Lukeman of a nymph gazing over a calm expanse of water in memory of Ida and Isidor Straus, husband and wife, he a United States congressman and co-owner of Macy's, who died together on RMS Titanic. The model for the statue was Audrey Munson. On the memorial is carved a passage from Second Samuel 1:23, "Lovely and pleasant were they in their lives and in their death they were not parted." The passage refers to Ida's choice to stay with her beloved husband, Isidor, rather than get safely into a lifeboat.

The Strauses lived in a house at 2747 Broadway, between 105th and 106th Streets, one block south of the location of the memorial.

The park exists on a small triangle of land at the intersection of Broadway and West End Avenue. It was known as Schuyler Square when acquired by the city in 1895 and was renamed Bloomingdale Square in 1907. Between 1995 and 1997, Straus Park was renovated and expanded to the west, by the addition of 15 feet of West End Avenue. An endowment established by the Straus family funded the transformation of a neglected reflecting pool in front of the sculpture into a planting bed. The Friends of Straus Park fund maintenance and the planting of seasonal flowers.

== In popular culture ==
- Straus Park is mentioned in André Aciman's essay "Shadow Cities" (The New York Review of Books, December 18, 1997) and novel Eight White Nights (2011).
- Straus Park is the title of a novel by Belgian author Paul Baeten Gronda, published in 2013.

== See also ==
- Titanic Memorial, six miles away
