= Isidor Straus =

American politician, businessman, and Titanic sinking victim (1845–1912)

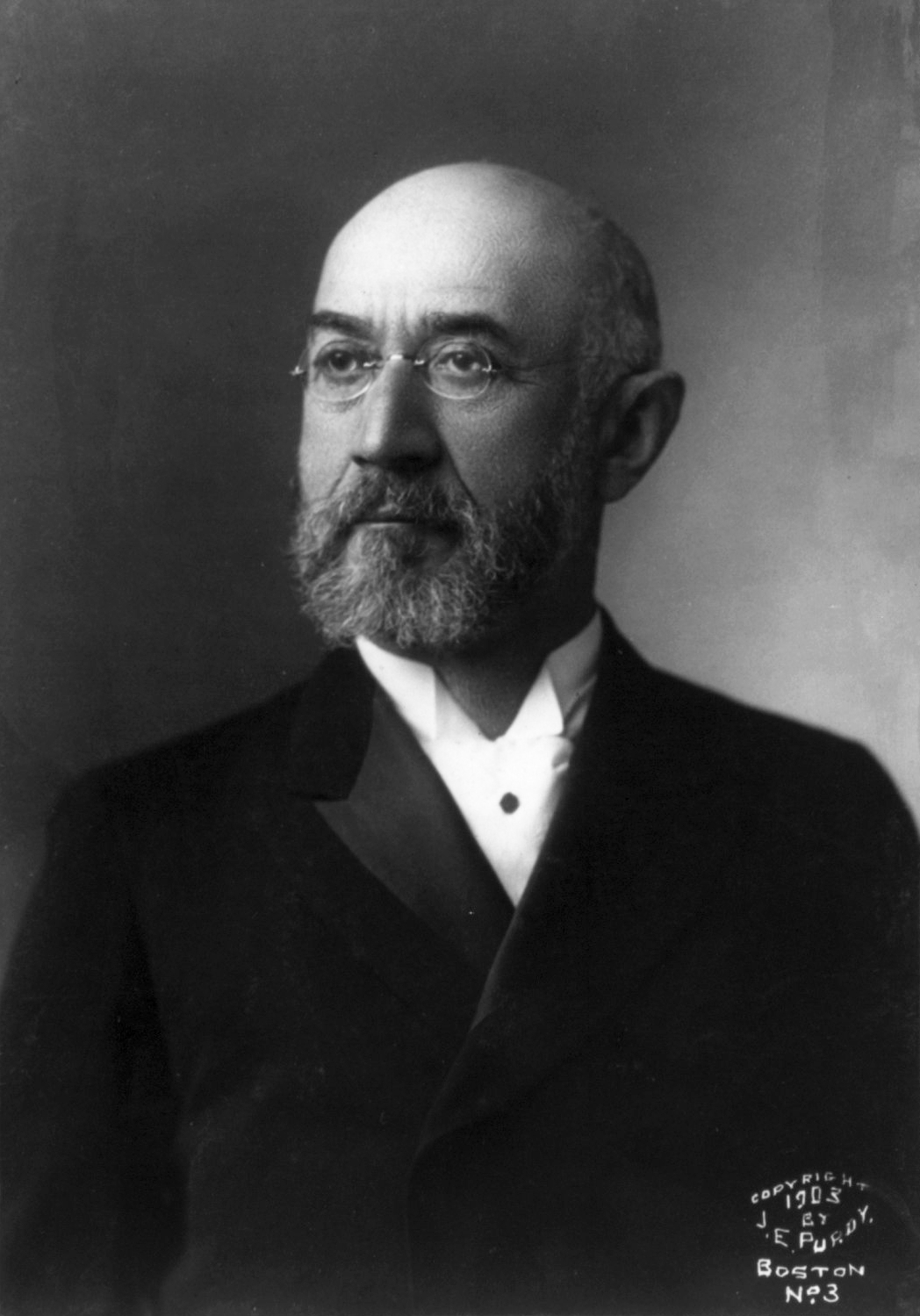
- Straus, c. 1903

Member of the U.S. House of Representatives from New York's 15th district
- In office January 30, 1894 – March 3, 1895
- Preceded by: Ashbel P. Fitch
- Succeeded by: Philip B. Low

Personal details
- Born: February 6, 1845 Otterberg, Kingdom of Bavaria
- Died: April 15, 1912 (aged 67) North Atlantic Ocean
- Party: Democratic
- Spouse: Rosalie Ida Blun (m. 1871)
- Children: 7, including Jesse
- Parents: Lazarus Straus (father); Sara Levi (mother)
- Relatives: Straus family
- Occupation: Businessman; philanthropist; politician
- Known for: Co-owner of R. H. Macy & Company and Abraham & Straus

Isidor Straus (February 6, 1845 – April 15, 1912) was an American politician and businessman, who was a co-owner of Macy's department store with his brother Nathan. He served just over a year as a member of the United States House of Representatives, representing the state of New York.

Straus was born in Germany but immigrated to the United States with his family when he was nine, settling in Georgia. During the American Civil War, Straus was on the side of the Confederate States of America and though he was not allowed to serve in the Confederate Army, he worked on their behalf in England. After the Civil War ended, the family moved to New York City where he and his brother began their business career.

Straus died in the sinking of the RMS Titanic, along with his wife Ida who refused to leave the ship without her husband. His body was recovered from the site of the wreck and buried at the Woodlawn Cemetery.

== Early life ==
Isidor Straus was born on February 6, 1845, into a Jewish family in Otterberg in the former Palatinate, then ruled by the Kingdom of Bavaria. He was the first of five children of Lazarus Straus (1809–1898) and his second wife and first cousin, Sara Straus (1823–1876). His siblings were Hermine (1846–1922), Nathan (1848–1931), Jakob Otto (1849–1851) and Oscar Solomon Straus (1850–1926). In 1854 he and his family immigrated to the United States, following his father, Lazarus, who immigrated two years before. They settled first in Columbus, Georgia, and then lived in Talbotton, Georgia, where their house still exists today.

Straus was preparing to go to the United States Military Academy at West Point when the outbreak of the American Civil War prevented him from doing so. In 1861, he was elected an officer in a Confederate military unit but was not allowed to serve because of his youth; in 1863, he went to England to secure ships for blockade running. Straus worked as an aide to a London-based Confederate agent while living in England, as well as a Confederate bond salesman in both London and Amsterdam.

== Career ==
After the Civil War, the Straus family moved to New York City, where Lazarus convinced Rowland Hussey Macy, founder of Macy's, to allow L. Straus & Sons to open a crockery department in the basement of his store.

Straus worked at L. Straus & Sons, which became the glass and china department at Macy's. In 1888, he and Nathan became partners of Macy's. In 1893, the brothers bought a controlling interest in Wechsler & Straus, renamed Abraham & Straus. By 1896, Isidor and his brother Nathan had gained full ownership of R. H. Macy & Co.

== Marriage and children ==
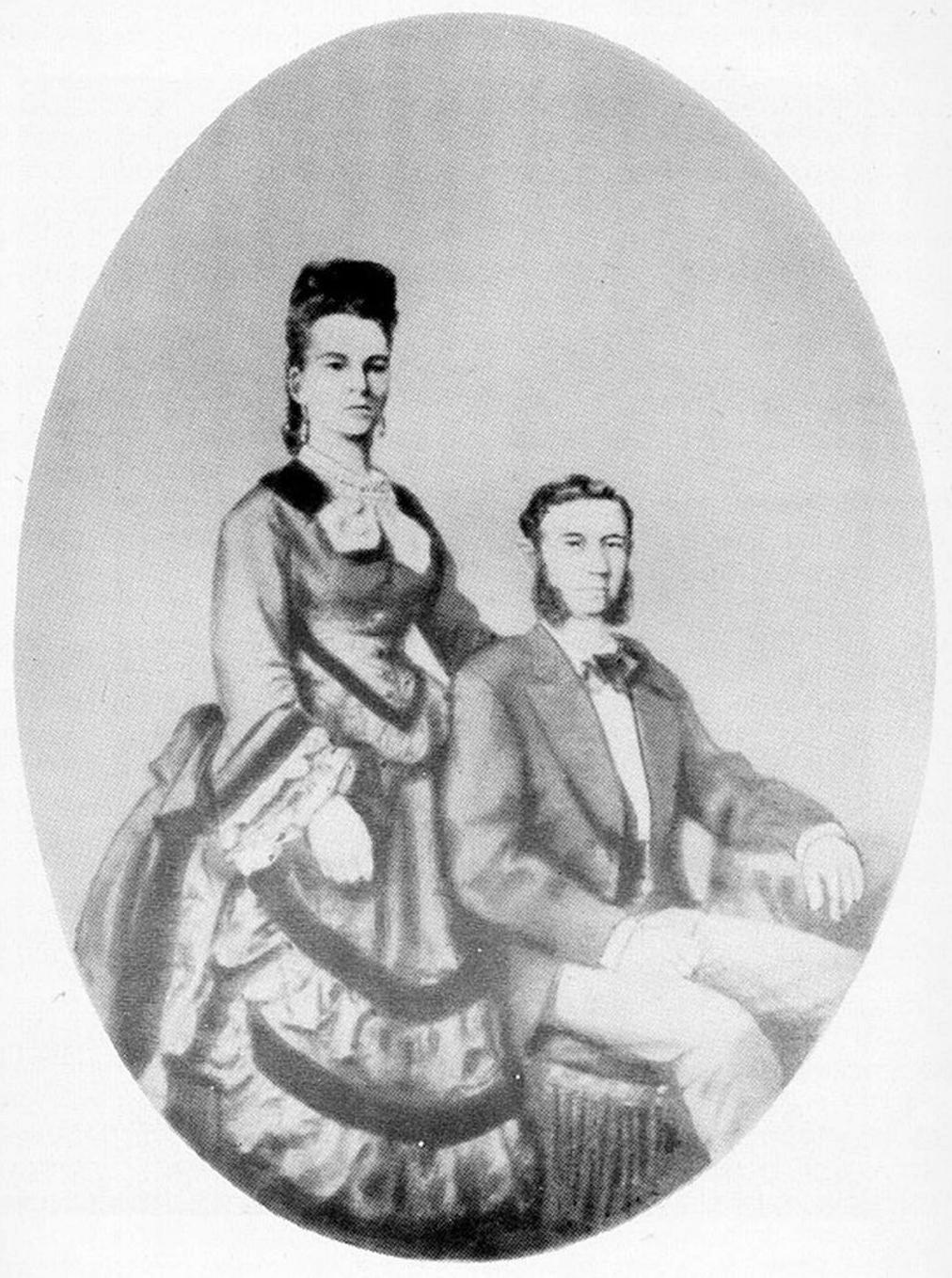
Wedding photo of the Strauses, 1871

In 1871, Straus married Rosalie Ida Blün (1849–1912). They were parents to seven children (one of whom died in infancy):

- Jesse Isidor Straus (1872–1936), who married Irma Nathan (1877–1970), and served as U.S. Ambassador to France, 1933–1936
- Clarence Elias Straus (1874–1876), who died in infancy
- Percy Selden Straus (1876–1944), who married Edith Abraham (1882–1957), daughter of Abraham Abraham
- Sara Straus (1878–1960), who married Dr. Alfred Fabian Hess (1875–1933)
- Minnie Straus (1880–1940), who married Dr. Richard Weil (1876–1917)
- Herbert Nathan Straus (1881–1933), who married Therese Kuhn in 1907 (1884–1977)
- Vivian Straus (1886–1967) first married Herbert Adolph Scheftel (1875–1914) with whom she had two of her three children and second, in 1917, married George A. Dixon Jr. (1891–1956).

Among his great-great-granddaughters are singer Mikaela Mullaney Straus, known by her stage name King Princess, and Wendy Rush (née Weil), the widow of Stockton Rush who founded the deep sea tourism company OceanGate and lost his life on a dive in a submersible in 2023 to the wreck of the Titanic.

== Congress ==
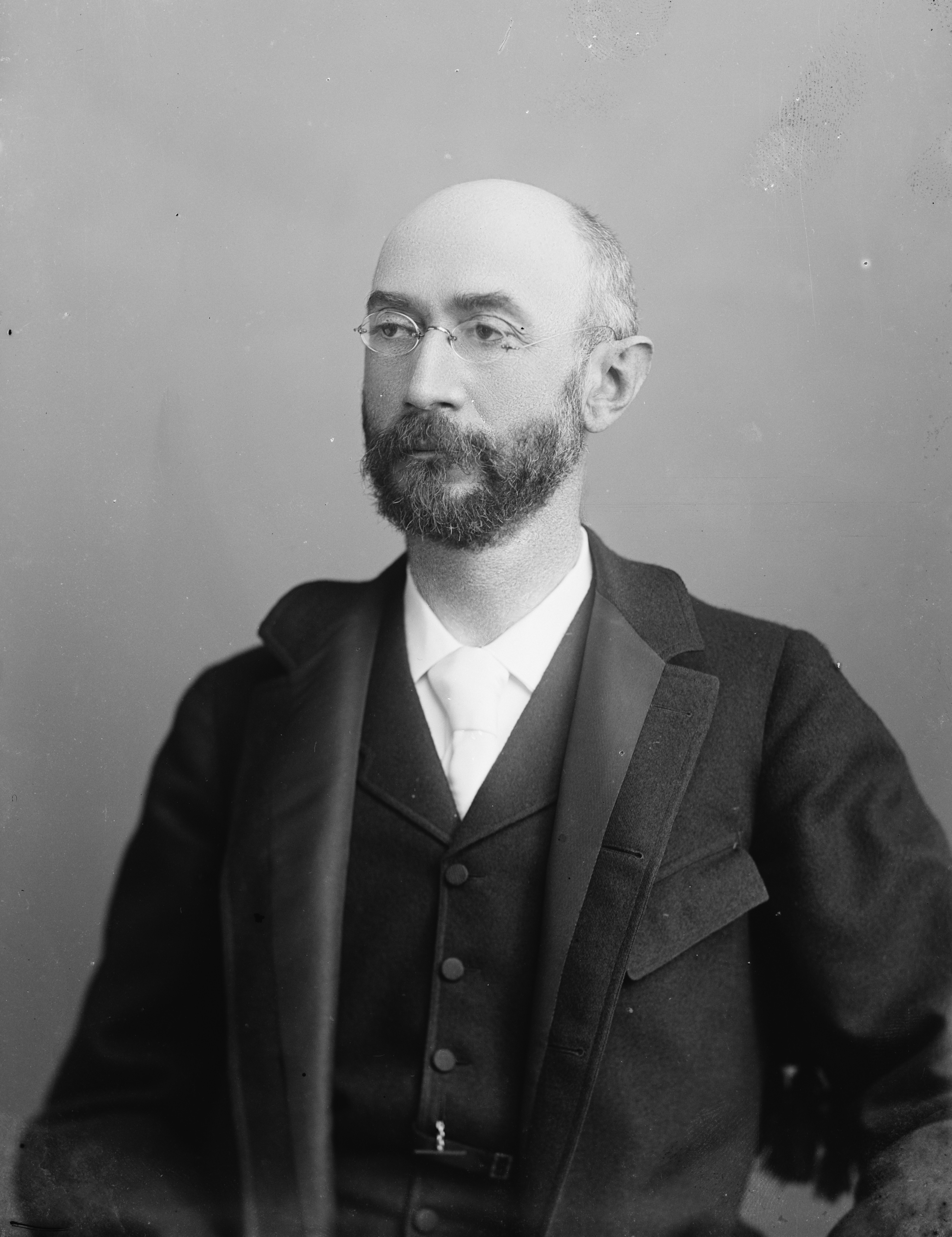
Portrait by C. M. Bell c. 1894–1895

Straus served as a U.S. Congressman from January 30, 1894, to March 3, 1895, representing New York's 15th congressional district as a Democrat. He won a special election in January 1894 to complete the term of Ashbel P. Fitch, who had resigned to become New York City Comptroller. During his one-year term, Straus was a champion of tariff reform, opposing the high rates of the McKinley Tariff and collaborating with West Virginia Congressman William Lyne Wilson on the Wilson–Gorman Tariff Act. Straus did not run for re-election in the general election of November 1894.

=== Other political activities ===
Straus was president of The Educational Alliance and a prominent worker in charitable and educational movements, very much interested in civil service reform and the general extension of education. He declined the office of Postmaster General which was offered him by U.S. President Grover Cleveland.

When the newly formed Mutual Alliance Trust Company opened for business in New York on the Tuesday after June 29, 1902, there were 13 directors, including Emanuel Lehman, William Rockefeller, Cornelius Vanderbilt, and Straus.

== Aboard the Titanic ==
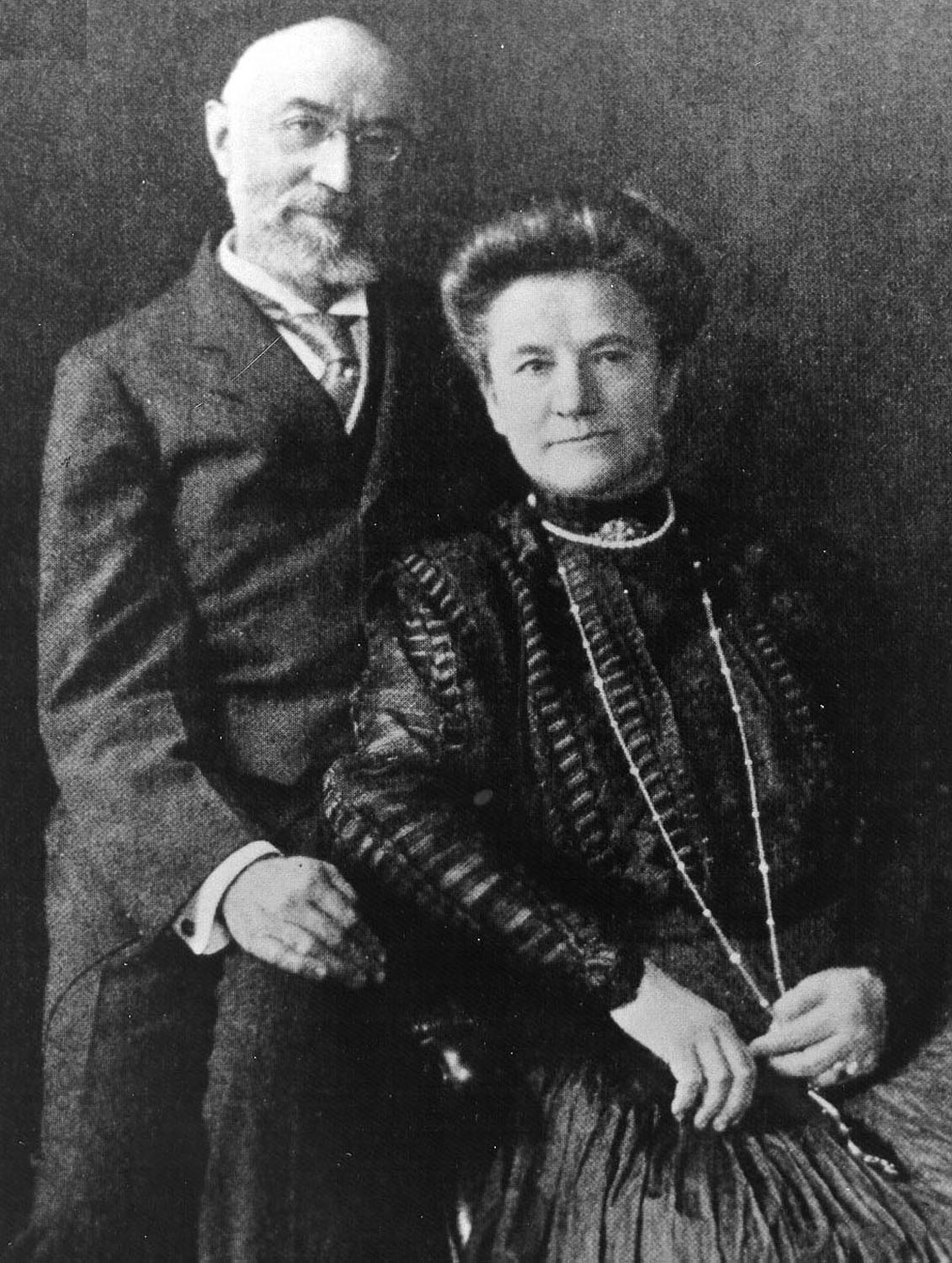
Isidor and Ida Straus

Isidor and his wife spent the winter of 1911/1912 in Europe. They originally planned to return home on a different ship, but switched to the Titanic due to a coal strike in England that caused numerous ships to be laid up.

Traveling back from a winter in Europe, mostly spent at Cape Martin in southern France, they exchanged marconigrams with their son and his wife, who were passengers on America as the ships passed near on its way to Europe. At about 11:40 p.m. on April 14, 1912, it hit an iceberg. Once it was clear the Titanic was sinking, Ida refused to leave Isidor and would not get into a lifeboat without him. According to friend and Titanic survivor Colonel Archibald Gracie IV, Ida refused to get into a lifeboat, reportedly having said, "I will not be separated from my husband. As we have lived, so we will die, together." Ida gave her maid Ellen Bird her fur coat and insisted she get into a lifeboat. Isidor and Ida were seen on deck arm in arm; eyewitnesses described the scene as a "most remarkable exhibition of love and devotion". Isidor and Ida perished along with about 1,500 others.

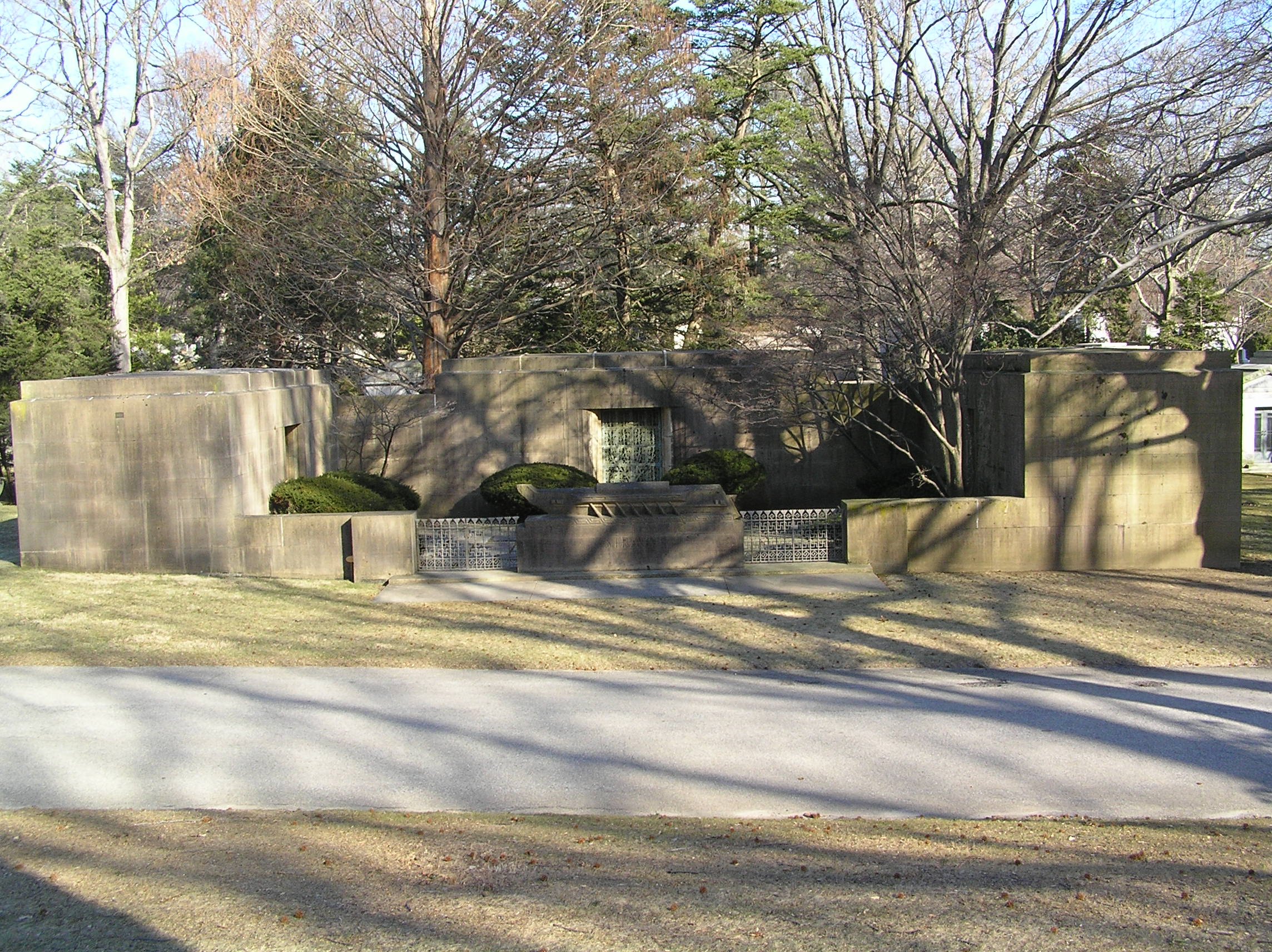
The gravesite of Isidor Straus in Woodlawn Cemetery

Isidor's body was recovered by CS Mackay-Bennett and taken to Halifax, Nova Scotia, and from there shipped to New York. He was first buried in the Straus-Kohns Mausoleum at Beth-El Cemetery in Brooklyn, and he was then moved to the Straus Mausoleum in Woodlawn Cemetery in the Bronx in 1928. Ida's body was never recovered, so the family collected water from the wreck site and placed it in an urn in the mausoleum. Isidor and Ida are memorialized on a cenotaph outside the mausoleum with a quote from the Song of Solomon (8:7): "Many waters cannot quench love—neither can the floods drown it."

An 18-karat gold trimmed Jules Jürgensen pocket watch given to Straus for his 43rd birthday in 1888 and recovered from his body was sold for a record-breaking £1.78 million ($2.32 million) at an auction in England on November 23, 2025.

== Legacy ==
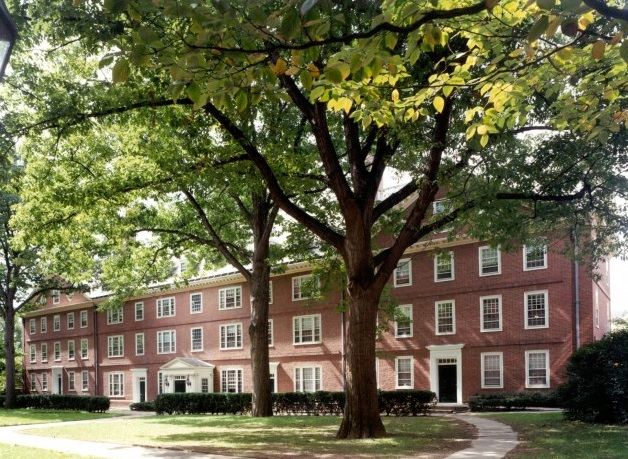
Straus Hall, Harvard College

A cenotaph at the Straus Mausoleum at Woodlawn Cemetery in the Bronx is dedicated to Isidor and Ida together. The work was designed by James Gamble Rogers, with sculpture by Lee Lawrie.

=== Memorials ===
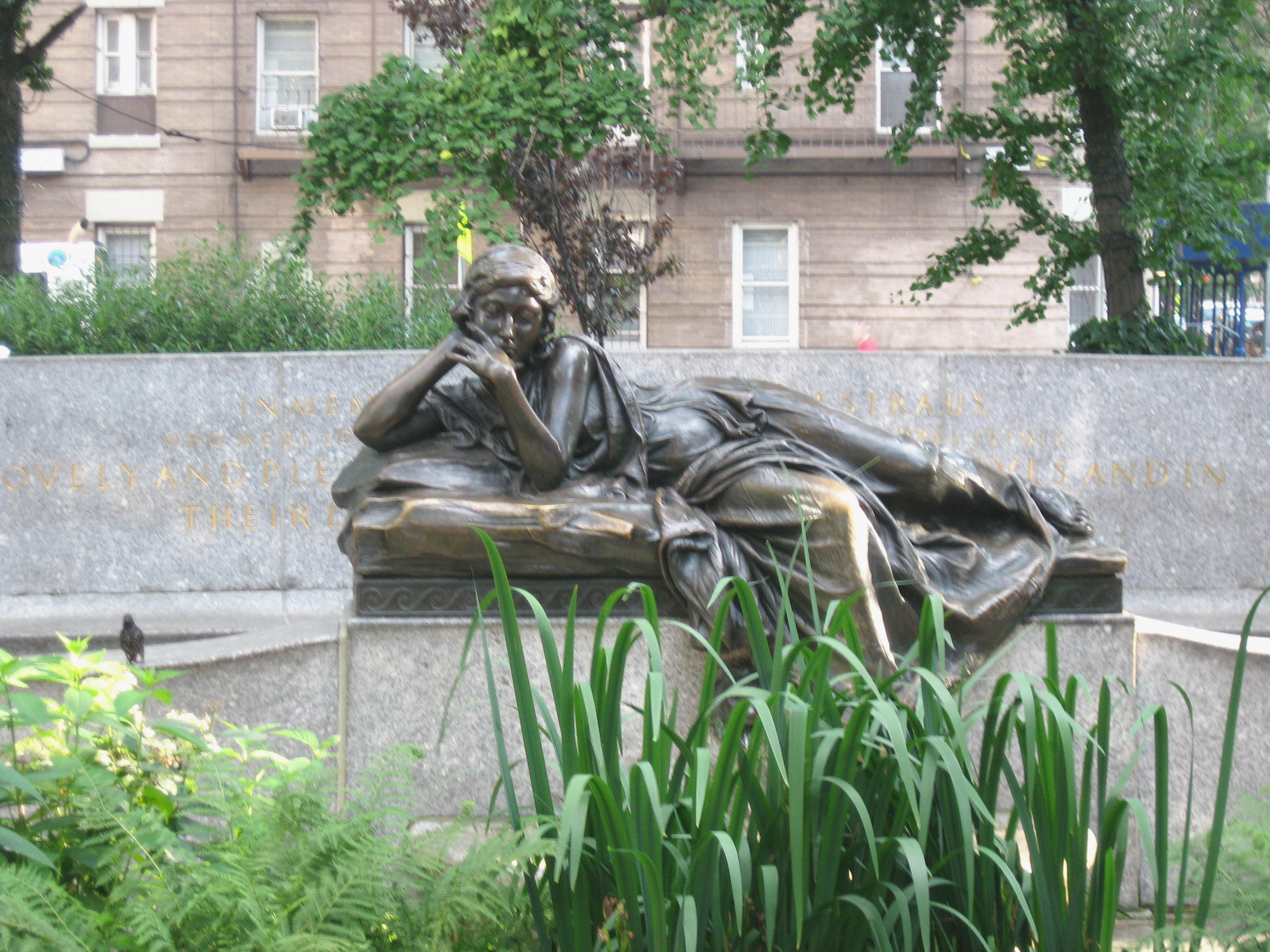
106th Street memorial, Straus Park, Manhattan

In addition to the cenotaph at Woodlawn Cemetery, there are three other memorials to Isidor and Ida Straus in their adopted home of New York City. Straus Hall, one of Harvard's freshman residence halls, was given in honor of the Strauses by their three sons.

- A memorial plaque can be seen on the main floor of Macy's Department Store in Manhattan.
- The Isidor and Ida Memorial is located in Straus Park, at the intersection of Broadway and West End Avenue at 106th Street (Duke Ellington Boulevard) in Manhattan. The park is one block from where they resided at 105th Street and West End Avenue (now the site of the Cleburne Building). An inscription reads, "Lovely and pleasant they were in their lives, and in death they were not divided." (2 Samuel 1:23)
- New York City Public School P.S. 198, built in Manhattan in 1959, is named in memory of Isidor and Ida Straus. The building, at Third Avenue between East 95th and 96th Streets, shares space with another school, P.S. 77.
- The 34th Street main entrance to Macy's Department Store in Manhattan features two brass plaques — one commemorating the deaths of Ida and Isidor Straus, the other honoring employees who died in World War I.
- The Isidor and Ida Straus Memorial is located in Straus Park at the intersection of Broadway and West End Avenue at W. 106th Street (Duke Ellington Boulevard) in Manhattan.

=== Portrayals ===
Straus and his wife are portrayed in the 1953 film Titanic, the 1958 film A Night to Remember, and in the musical Titanic, in scenes that are faithful to the accounts described by eyewitnesses. In the 1979 film S.O.S. Titanic, Ida and Isidor are shown; the film deviates from the accounts, by depicting Ida telling Isidor that she plans to "stay a little while."

In the 1997 film Titanic, the Strauses are briefly depicted awaiting their end on their bed as their stateroom floods with water (despite there being no evidence they returned to their cabin, and the fact that Isidor's body was recovered), during a sequence of emotional events while the ship's string quartet plays the hymn "Nearer My God to Thee". A deleted scene, in harmony with the accounts of rescued survivors, shows Isidor attempting to persuade Ida to enter a lifeboat, which she refuses to do.

- Roy Gordon (1953) - Titanic
- Charles Meredith (1955) - (You Are There: The Sinking of the Titanic (TV episode, 22 May 1955)
- Edgar Stehli (1956) - Kraft Television Theatre; A Night to Remember
- Meier Tzelniker (1958) - A Night to Remember
- Gordon Whiting (1979) - S.O.S. Titanic (TV film)
- Peter Haworth (1996) - Titanic (TV miniseries)
- Lew Palter (1997) - Titanic
- Dan Birnbaum (1998) - Titanic: Secrets Revealed (TV documentary)
- Bobby Noblett (2017) - Titanic: Sinking the Myths (Docudrama)
- Howard Elson (2024) - Unsinkable

=== Family ===
Straus' great-great granddaughter, Mikaela Straus, is a recording artist known as King Princess. Another great-great granddaughter is Wendy Rush, the director of communications for OceanGate & wife of Stockton Rush, the company's founder, who died in the Titan submersible implosion while visiting the wreck of the Titanic.

== See also ==
- 6-15-99 Club
- List of Jewish members of the United States Congress

U.S. House of Representatives
Preceded by Ashbel P. Fitch	Member of the U.S. House of Representatives from New York's 15th congressional district 1894–1895	Succeeded by Philip B. Low
