= Elinor S. Gimbel =

American women's rights activist (1896–1983)

- Born: Elinor Steiner Gimbel; August 5, 1896
- Died: March 3, 1983 (age 86)
- Resting place: Arlington National Cemetery
- Spouse(s): Monroe Hess (divorced); Louis S. Gimbel Jr.
- Children: Nicholas Hess; Louis S. (Tom) Gimbel 3d Stinor Gimbel
- Parent(s): Sadie Liebmann Steiner; Samuel Simon Steiner
- Family: Joseph Liebmann (grandfather); Samuel Liebmann (great-grandfather)

Elinor Steiner Gimbel (August 5, 1896 – March 3, 1983) was an American progressive leader and women's rights activist.

== Biography ==
She was born Elinor Steiner to a Jewish family in 1896, the daughter of Sadie (née Liebmann) and Samuel Simon Steiner. Her mother, the daughter of Joseph Liebmann, belonged to the family that owned Liebmann Breweries; and her father was the owner of S. S. Steiner, Inc, then the largest hop distributor in the country. In 1914, she graduated from the Calhoun School.

In the 1930s, Gimbel was motivated by the Great Depression and Franklin Delano Roosevelt's New Deal to become politically active. In 1940, Gimbel established the Non-Partisan Committee to support Roosevelt's third term in office.

After the death of her second husband during World War II, she founded the Committee for the Care of Children in Wartime which focused on the lack of government support provided to working mothers.

In 1947, Gimbel and Anita McCormick Blaine of Chicago (a daughter and heiress of Cyrus McCormick) were the two major funders of the Progressive Citizens of America (PCA) group. She also joined the Progressive Party serving as its "women's voice." She was chair of the Women For Wallace (WFW) committee which supported Progressive Party candidate Henry A. Wallace over Harry S. Truman whom she deemed the "accidental occupant of the White House." Although Jewish, she did not tie her progressive activism with Zionism and hosted lavish Christmas parties at her home in New York City before, during, and after World War II . Later in life she endorsed Ronald Reagan for President because "Carter was a flop".

Gimbel served as an executive at S. S. Steiner, Inc. and Liebmann Breweries.

== Personal life ==
Gimbel married twice. She had a son, Nicholas Hess, with her first husband, Monroe Hess, whom she married after she graduated from the Calhoun School; they later divorced. In 1924, she married Louis S. Gimbel Jr., grandson of Adam Gimbel; they had two sons, Louis (Tom) S. Gimbel III and Stinor Gimbel. Her husband – who served as a Lieutenant Colonel in the Air Transport Command Army Air Corps – was killed while a passenger in an Army Air Corps transport plane crash over Maine in 1942. She and her husband are buried at Arlington National Cemetery in Virginia.
