= Joseph Liebmann =

German American brewer

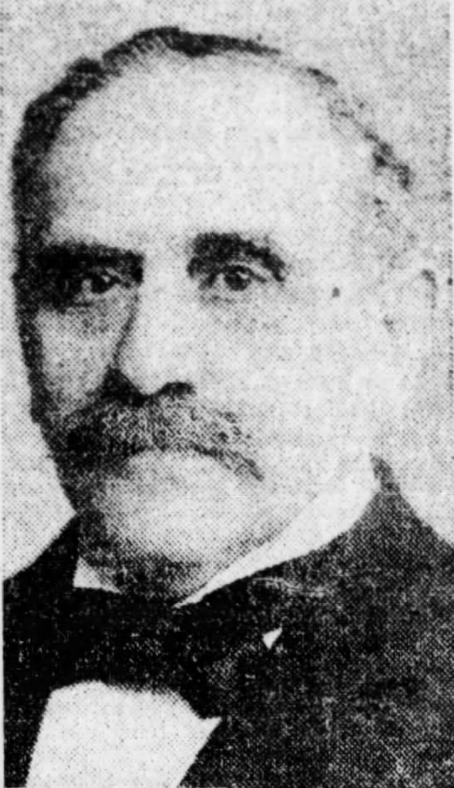
- Born: December 20, 1831; Aufhausen, Kingdom of Württemberg
- Died: March 26, 1913 (age 82); New York City
- Occupation: Businessman
- Known for: President of S. Liebmann Brewery
- Spouse: Rosa Königsberger
- Children: Adolph Liebmann; David Liebmann; Ida Liebmann; Sadie Liebmann
- Parent(s): Sara Selz Liebmann; Samuel Liebmann
- Family: Elinor S. Gimbel (granddaughter); Charles Liebmann (brother); Henry Liebmann (brother)

Joseph Liebmann (December 20, 1831 – March 26, 1913) was a German-born American brewer and president of S. Liebmann Brewery (later Rheingold Breweries) in Brooklyn, New York. The brewery's main brand Rheingold Extra Dry was one of the most popular beer brands in New York City in the 1940s to 1960s.

== Biography ==
Joseph Liebmann was born to a Jewish family in Aufhausen in 1831, the son of Dara (née Selz) and Samuel Liebmann. His father was, at the time, the owner of the estate Schloss Schmiedelfeld. In 1840, the family moved to Ludwigsburg and ran the inn "Zum Stern" and its attached brewery. His father determined to immigrate to the United States for political reasons and sent Joseph in 1850 in advance to procure a home. In 1854, the remainder of the family immigrated settling in Williamsburg, Brooklyn. The family first leased and operated the old Maasche Brewery and later, pooling their resources, built a new brewery in Bushwick named the S. Liebmann Brewery.

In 1868, Liebmann opened the Obermeyer and Liebmann Havana Brewery with his brother-in-law David Obermeyer; the brewery was operated independent of the Liebmann brewery although in 1924, it was merged into the family brewery. After the death of his father in 1872, the three sons took over the management of the brewery and incorporated it as S. Liebmann's Sons Brewing Company. The Liebmann brothers alternated with each other as chief executive officer each year. Joseph Liebmann was primarily responsible for financial matters; Henry for brewing; and Charles for management and operations. In 1903, the Liebmann brothers retired and handed over the management of the company to six of their sons.

In 1876, Liebmann was a member of the committee that was responsible for organizing the brewery exhibition at the Centennial Exhibition. Liebmann also served as President of Bushwick Savings Bank for 27 years; as managing director of the Kings County Trust Company; and as a member of the Brooklyn Board of Education (1882–1885).

Joseph Liebmann died at his home in Manhattan on March 26, 1913.

== Personal life ==
On January 4, 1910, Liebmann married Rosa Königsberger (January 11, 1862 – January 12, 1866); they had 4 children:

- Adolph Liebmann (born January 12, 1866)
- David Liebmann (born October 24, 1863)
- Ida Liebmann (born June 24, 1871)
- Sadie Liebmann (December 25, 1868 – May 20, 1939) married to Samuel Simon Steiner; their daughter Elinor S. Gimbel (1896–1983) married Louis S. Gimbel, Jr., grandson of Adam Gimbel
