= Kommt her, ihr Kreaturen all =

Catholic procession hymn

- Catholic procession hymn
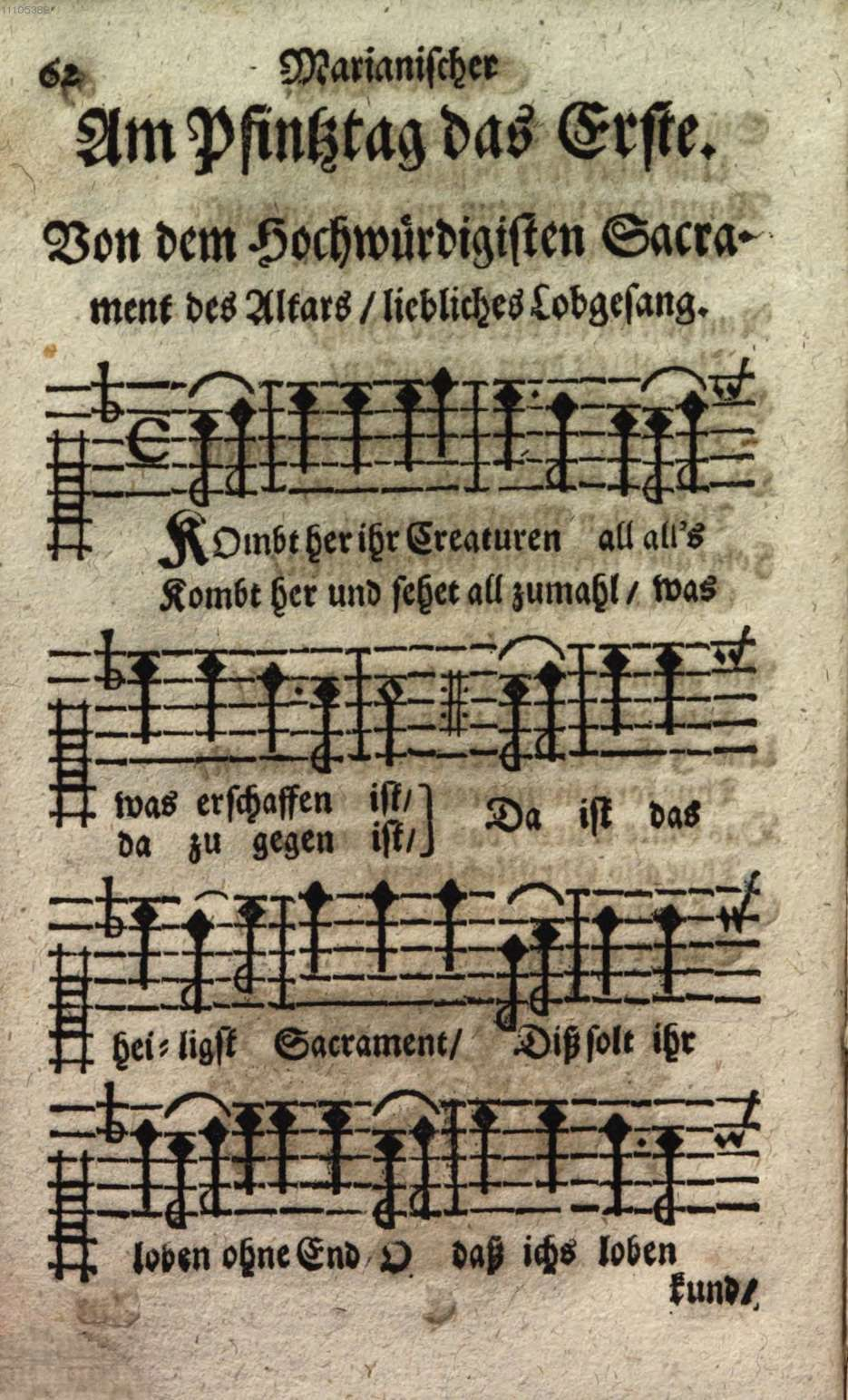
- First edition
- English: "Come all ye creatures of the Lord"
- Occasion: Corpus Christi
- Text: by Johann Georg Seidenbusch
- Language: German
- Melody: from Regensburg
- Composed: 1657
- Published: 1687

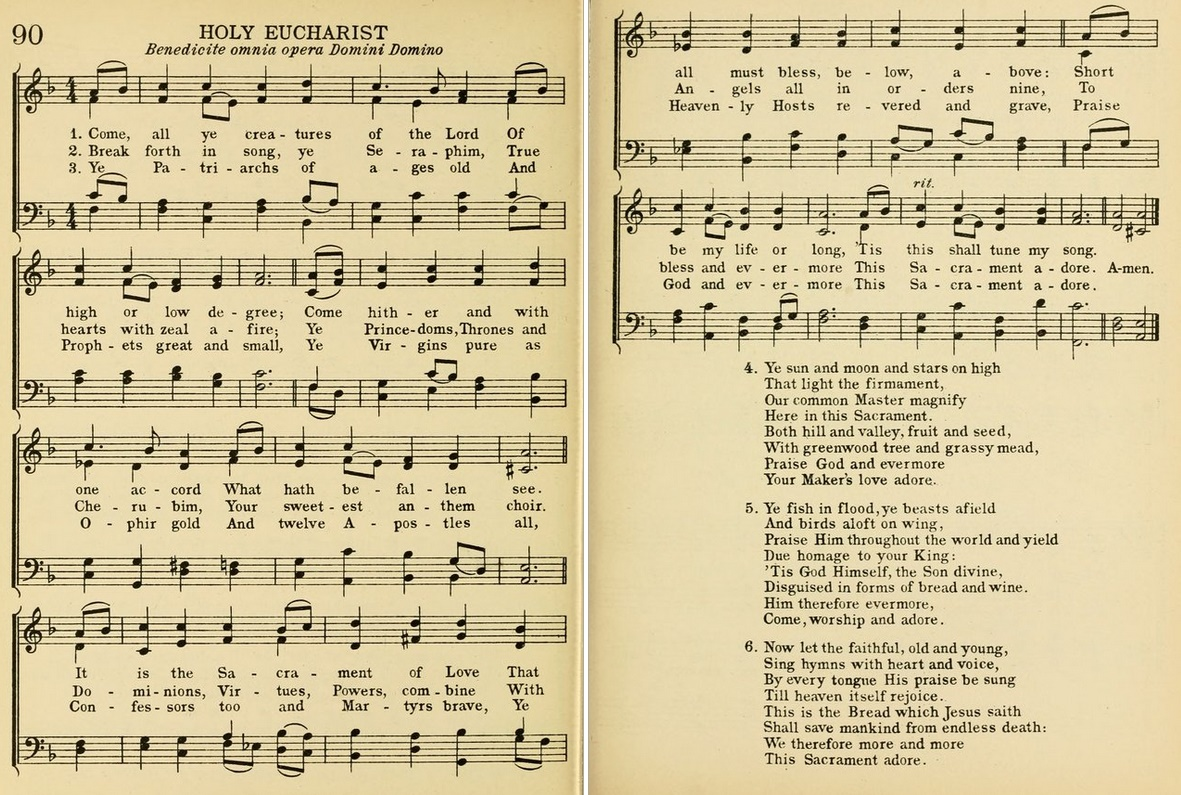
"Come all ye creatures of the Lord"

"Kommt her, ihr Kreaturen all" ("Come all ye creatures of the Lord") is a Catholic hymn with words in German by Johann Georg Seidenbusch, first published in Regensburg in 1687, using a local melody of 1657. It has appeared in regional sections of the German hymnal Gotteslob. The hymn was translated into English as "Come all ye creatures of the Lord". It is commonly used as a hymn sung during processions on the Feast of Corpus Christi.

== History ==
Johann Georg Seidenbusch probably wrote the text of "Kommt her, ihr Kreaturen all". With a 1657 melody, he published it first in his 1687 devotional collectional Marianischer Schnee-Berg (Marian snow-mountain), subtitled "Beschreibung der Andacht bey Unser Lieben Frawen zum Schnee auff dem Berg zu Auffhausen ... Sambt Neun und zwantzig Bitt- und Lob-Gesänglein" (Description of the devotion of Our Dear Lady of the Snow on the mountain of Auffhausen ... with 29 little songs of prayer and praise) in Regensburg. The song is still used as a processional hymn for Fronleichnam, in English: Feast of Corpus Christi. It has appeared in regional sections of the German hymnal Gotteslob, such as in the Diocese of Cologne as GL 839, in the Diocese of Hamburg as GL 885, and in the Diocese of Münster as GL 849. It is also part of other collections.

The hymn was translated into English as "Come all ye creatures of the Lord" by George Ratcliffe Woodward, and published in his Songs of Syon in 1904.

== Uses ==
"Kommt her, ihr Kreaturen all" is a popular hymn for Corpus Christ processions. Lothar Zenetti quoted the first line in a poem titled "Fronleichnam", published in the collection Auf seiner Spur: Texte gläubiger Zuversicht (On His track: texts of faithful confidence) in 2012. The first line was quoted for a 2017 exhibition at the museum of the Diocese of Osnabrück, Über die Tiere an der Krippe, of animals at the manger as artists added them to nativity scenes although they are not mentioned in the Bible. During the COVID-19 pandemic in 2020, when the traditional processions were cancelled, a parish in Oppenheim created a video showing a virtual carpet of flowers, with the song as the background music.
