= Peter Hand Brewing Company =

Former American brewing company

Peter Hand Brewing
- Industry: Beverages
- Founded: 1891, 135 years ago
- Founder: Peter Hand
- Defunct: 1978
- Headquarters: 1000 W. North Avenue, Chicago, Illinois, United States
- Area served: Regional
- Products: Beer

The Peter Hand Brewing Company was an American brewery established in 1891 by Prussian immigrant and American Civil War veteran Peter Hand in Chicago, Illinois. The company is notable for popularizing the light beer recipe it would later sell to Miller Brewing, which thereafter rebranded it "Light Beer from Miller", and, ultimately, Miller Lite. When the brewery closed in 1978, it was the last brewing company in Chicago, until Sieben's River North opened in 1987.

== History ==
Peter Hand, a Prussian-born Civil War veteran, who had previously worked for the Conrad Seipp Brewing Company, established his brewery in 1891 in Chicago. By the time Hand died in 1899, he had found success with a lager named Meister Brau. The brewery continued to grow and though it was "officially" closed between 1920 and 1933 (as a result of prohibition), the company survived and expanded several times. In 1965, an investor group purchased the brewery and renamed the company Meister Brau Inc., intending to further expand and begin national distribution. The company spent heavily on marketing, particularly in Chicago, and sponsored the Chicago White Sox, Chicago Blackhawks, and Chicago Bulls sports teams, as well as a popular radio show, in addition to distributing a wide array of bottle openers, posters and other ephemera. Their advertising campaign also included billboards; their number was second only to those advertising the re-election campaign of Mayor Richard J. Daley. The company also acquired a previously unsuccessful light beer recipe, which they reformulated and relaunched as "Meister Brau Lite"; this beer became widely popular. By the end of the 1960s, the company was producing a million barrels of beer each year and sales were in excess of $50 million. However, due to mismanagement and heavy debt, the company ran a large deficit and in 1972 most of their existing brands were sold to Miller, who went on to repackage Meister Brau Lite as Miller Lite (and the Meister Brau brand as a cheaper competitor to Anheuser-Busch's Budweiser). Despite the infusion of cash and reverting to the Peter Hand Brewing name, the company filed bankruptcy in 1973, at which point it was purchased at auction by a new group headed by Fred Huber, who had been associated with the Joseph Huber Brewing Company. However, in 1978 the brewery closed permanently.

== Brands ==
Peter Hand developed and marketed a large number of brands. In addition to their flagships Meister Brau and Meister Brau Lite, they also produced beers under the brands Old Chicago Lager, Peter Hand Reserve, Old Crown Ale, Old German, Alps Brau, Peter Hand Extra Light, Van Merritt, Braumeister, Burgemeister, Peter Hand Export, and Holiday Beer.

=== Meister Brau Lite ===
Early light beers were typically created by adding more water to existing lagers, resulting in a mediocre product.

In late 1966, New York's Rheingold Brewery introduced a 4.2% pale lager, Gablinger's Diet Beer. Using a process developed by Swiss chemist Dr. Hersch Gablinger, and a recipe developed by company biochemist Joseph Owades, it was marketed as a "diet beer", but failed to gain consumer acceptance.

Gablinger's process involved adding the enzyme amyloglucosidase during fermentation that converted otherwise-nonfermentable starch into fermentable sugar, which eliminated a portion of carbohydrates from the finished beer and, along with a slight reduction in alcohol content, reduced its calories by approximately one-third. Rheingold purchased the rights to Gablinger's process and Owades used it to develop the recipe for Gablinger Beer, which was introduced by Rheingold. After it was discontinued the recipe was given to Peter Hand Brewing, which made minor adjustments and successfully relaunched it as Meister Brau Lite.
