= Henry Liebmann =

German-American brewer

- Born: Heinrich Liebmann; December 6, 1836; Schmiedelfeld, Sulzbach-Laufen, Kingdom of Württemberg
- Died: March 27, 1915 (age 79); New York City, US
- Occupation: Businessman
- Known for: President of S. Liebmann Brewery
- Parent(s): Sara Selz Liebmann; Samuel Liebmann
- Family: Marc Eugene Meyer (son-in-law); Charles Liebmann (brother); Joseph Liebmann (brother)

Henry Liebmann (December 6, 1836 – March 27, 1915) was a German-born American brewer and president of S. Liebmann Brewery (later Rheingold Breweries) in Brooklyn, New York. The brewery's main brand, Rheingold Extra Dry, was one of the most popular beer brands in New York City in the 1940s to 1960s.

== Biography ==
Heinrich Liebmann was born to a Jewish family in Schmiedelfeld in 1836, the son of Dara (née Selz) and Samuel Liebmann. His father was, at the time, the owner of the estate Schloss Schmiedelfeld. In 1840, the family moved to Ludwigsburg and ran the inn "Zum Stern" and its attached brewery; and where Henry attended secondary school. His father determined to immigrate to the United States for political reasons and sent his son, Joseph, in 1850 in advance to procure a home. In 1854, the remainder of the family immigrated, settling in Williamsburg, Brooklyn. The family first leased and operated the old Maasche Brewery and later, pooling their resources, built a new brewery in Bushwick named the S. Liebmann Brewery.

After the death of his father in 1872, the three sons took over the management of the brewery and incorporated it as S. Liebmann's Sons Brewing Company. The Liebmann brothers alternated with each other as chief executive officer each year. Henry was responsible for brewing; Joseph for financial matters; and Charles for management and operations. In 1903, the Liebmann brothers retired and handed over the management of the company to six of their sons.

Liebmann died in 1915 in New York City.

== Personal life ==
On June 21, 1819, Liebmann married Emma Dellevie (born June 21, 1849); they had 7 children:

- Sara Liebmann (born December 13, 1868), married Morris Heimerdinger
- Harriet Liebmann (born April 11, 1870), married Joseph E. Heimerdinger
- Samuel Liebmann (born October 11, 1873), married Viola Salomon, 2 sons
  - Samuel Liebmann Jr. (born August 30, 1907)
  - William B. Liebmann (born June 17, 1912)
- Walter H. Liebmann (born November 19, 1874), married Lulu Waxelbaum, 3 children
  - Henry Liebmann (born May 29, 1902)
  - Eleanor Liebmann (born June 5, 1905)
  - Walter H. Liebmann Jr. (born June 1, 1906)
- Charles Joseph Liebmann (born March 13, 1877), married Aline Meyer, daughter of Marc Eugene Meyer, 2 children
  - Charles J. Liebmann Jr. (born October 30, 1909)
  - Margaret H. Liebmann (born December 24, 1913)
- Edward Liebmann (July 12, 1876 – April 25, 1890)
- Kathleen Liebmann (born September 6, 1888), married Milton Jacob Bach
