= Charles Liebmann =

German entrepreneur (1837–1928)

- Born: November 16, 1837; Schmiedelfeld, Sulzbach-Laufen, Kingdom of Württemberg
- Died: June 12, 1928 (age 91); New York City, US
- Occupation: Businessman
- Known for: President of S. Liebmann Brewery
- Spouse: Sophia Bendix
- Children: 4
- Parent(s): Dara Selz Liebmann; Samuel Liebmann
- Family: Joseph Liebmann (brother); Henry Liebmann (brother)

Charles Liebmann (November 16, 1837 – June 12, 1928) was a German-born American brewer and president of S. Liebmann Brewery (later Rheingold Breweries) in Brooklyn, New York. The brewery's main brand Rheingold Extra Dry was one of the most popular beer brands in New York City in the 1940s to 1960s.

== Biography ==
Charles Liebmann was born to a Jewish family in Schmiedelfeld in 1837, the son of Dara (née Selz) and Samuel Liebmann. His father was, at the time, the owner of the estate Schloss Schmiedelfeld. In 1840, the family moved to Ludwigsburg and ran the inn "Zum Stern" and its attached brewery; and where the young Liebmann attended secondary school. His father determined to immigrate to the United States for political reasons and sent Charles' brother in 1850 in advance to procure a home. In 1854, the remainder of the family immigrated settling in Williamsburg, Brooklyn. The family first operated the old Maasche Brewery while Charles worked as a cooper at the F. & M. Schaefer Brewing Company. Pooling their resources, the family built a new brewery in Bushwick named the S. Liebmann Brewery.

After the death of his father in 1872, the three sons took over the management of the brewery and renamed it S. Liebmann's Sons Brewing Company. The Liebmann brothers alternated with each other as chief executive officer each year. Charles Liebmann was considered the technical director of the company. In 1903, the Liebmann brothers retired and handed over the management of the company to six of their sons.

== Personal life ==
On October 22, 1865, Liebmann married Sophia Bendix; they had four children:

- Henry Liebmann (born August 19, 1866), died as a child
- Julius Liebmann (November 16, 1868 - October 8, 1957)
- Alfred Liebmann (July 20, 1871 - December 1957), married to Alma Wallach Liebmann (1882-1938), 2 children:
  - Dorothea Liebmann, married to Roger Williams Straus Jr., son of Gladys Eleanor Guggenheim Straus
  - Philip Liebmann (February 19, 1915 - February 2, 1972), married Dorothy Walp in 1942, divorced 1943; married Linda Darnell in 1954, divorced; married Joan Barry in 1955, sister of Al Barry
- Amanda Liebmann (born September 10, 1872)

Liebmann died on June 12, 1928, in New York City.
