= Gegrüßet seist du, Königin =

1687 Marian hymn by Johann Georg Seidenbusch

- Marian hymn
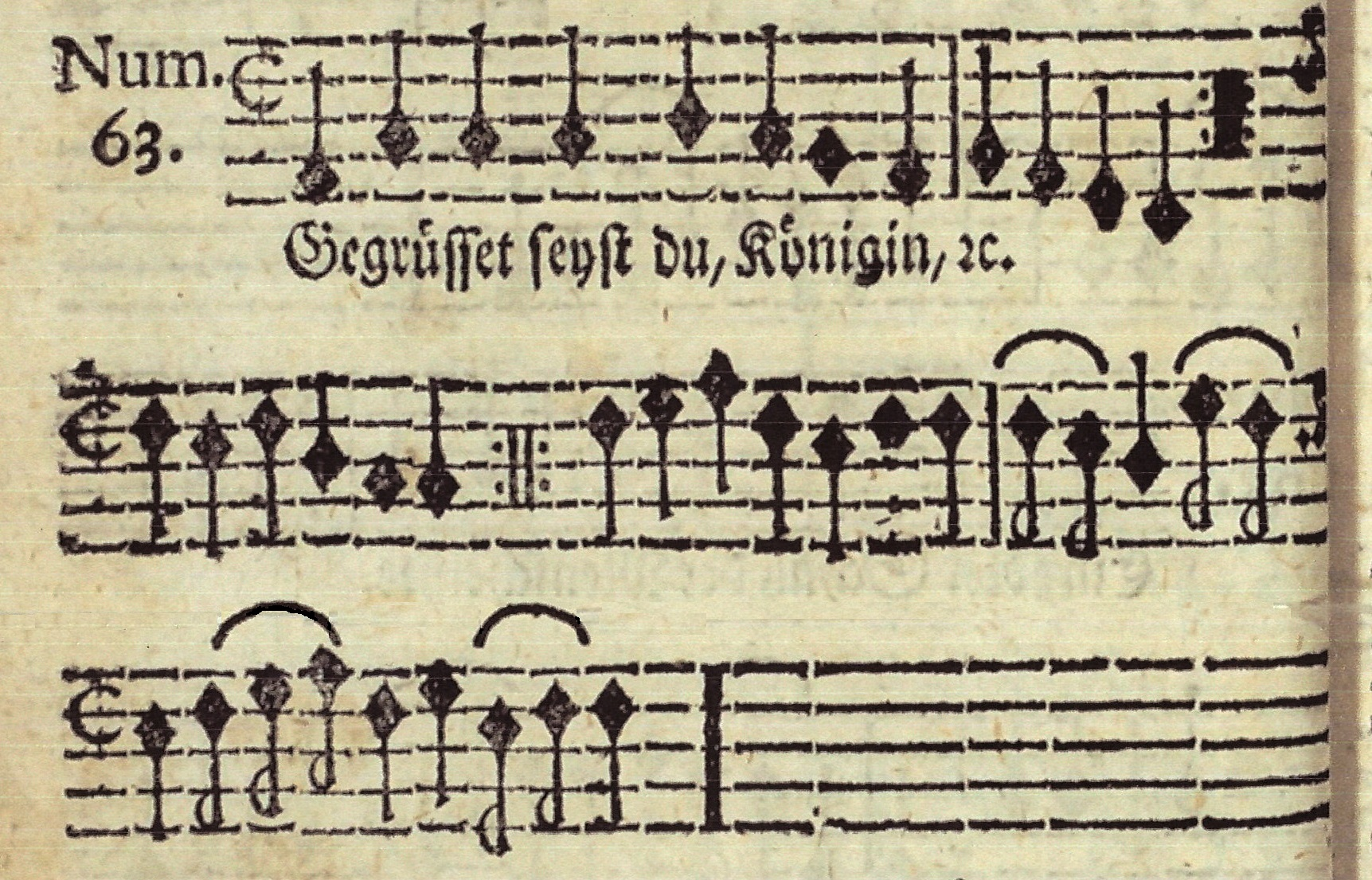
- Hildesheim melody, 1736
- Native name: Gegrüßet seist du, Königin
- Text: by Johann Georg Seidenbusch
- Language: German
- Based on: Salve Regina
- Published: 1687
- 1687 melody, Aufhausen 1712 melody, Mainz 1736 melody, Hildesheim

"Gegrüßet seist du, Königin" (also known as Salve Regina coelitum or Hail, Holy Queen enthroned above) is a Catholic hymn, based on a hymn to Mary in Latin, Salve Regina. Singers call Mary, the mother of Jesus, with many attributes and request her help in the misery of the world. The first version was published in 1687 by Johann Georg Seidenbusch. It became part of hymnals with several melodies. The 2013 common German hymnal Gotteslob has a version in six stanzas as GL 536, with a melody first published in Mainz in 1712. In the U.S., the song became popular with a 1736 melody from Hildesheim.

== History ==
Seidenbusch became priest of Aufhausen in the Diocese of Regensburg in 1667, where he founded a community of brothers; they ran a pilgrimage church, called Maria Schnee. For this church, Seidenbusch published a devotional collection in 1687, titled Marianischer Schnee-Berg, oder Beschreibung der Andacht bey Unser Lieben Frawen zum Schnee auff dem Berg zu Auffhausen … Sambt Neun und zwantzig Bitt- und Lob-Gesänglein (Marian snow mountain, or description of the devotion of Our Dear Lady of the Snow on the mountain of Aufhaussen, with 29 little songs of prayer and praise). The hymn is titled "Ein schönes Salve Regina Durch welches die wochentliche Andacht zu Auffhausen mit den Engelein beschlossen wird" (A beautiful Salve Regina by which the weekly devotion in Aufhausen with the angels is closed)". Each stanza contains a short acclamation of Mary, taken from the Latin Salve Regina, and a long refrain in German, ending with the Latin line "Salve salve, salve Regina". The refrain, calling the cherubim and seraphim to sing to their queen, is not taken from the Salve Regina.

The song became part of many collections, in many different versions. The first print of the melody now in Gotteslob appeared in a Mainz hymnal of 1712.

A different melody appeared first in a 1736 hymnal from Hildesheim, Geistliche Spiel- und Weckuhr. It was taken by emigrants to the U.S., with an English text, Hail, Holy Queen, enthroned above, which first appeared in The Roman Missal in 1884. This version became popular after it was featured in the 1992 film Sister Act.

== Lyrics ==
Modern version of the 1736 melody.

Gegrüßet seist du, Königin (1687)	Salve Regina coelitum (1728)	Hail, Holy Queen enthroned above (1884)
Gegrüst seyst du O Königin Salve Regina. Himmels und Erden Kayserin / Salve Maria. Erfreuet euch ihr Cherubin Seraphin / Grüsset eiver Königin / grüsset Mariam. O Mutter der Barmherßigkeit / Salve Regina. Aus allen du gebenedeyt / Salve Maria. Erfreuet euch ihr Cherubin Seraphin / Lobet eiver Königin lobet Mariam. O Leben / und O Süssigkeit Salve Regina. O groß der Mensch - und Engel Fremd Salve Maria. Erfreuet euch ihr Cherubin / Seraphin / Ehret euer Königin / ehret Mariam.	Salve, Regina coelitum, o Maria! Sors unica terrigenum, o Maria! Jubilate, Cherubim, Exsultate, Seraphim! Consonate perpetim: Salve, salve, salve, Regina. Mater misericordiae, o Maria! Dulcis parens clementiae, o Maria! Jubilate, Cherubim, Exsultate, Seraphim! Consonate perpetim: Salve, salve, salve, Regina.	Hail, Holy Queen enthroned above, O Maria! Hail, Mother of mercy and of love, O Maria! Triumph all ye cherubim! Sing with us ye seraphim! Heaven and earth resound the hymn! Salve, salve, salve, Regina! Our life, our sweetness here below, O Maria! Our hope in sorrow and in woe, O Maria! Triumph all ye cherubim! Sing with us ye seraphim! Heaven and earth resound the hymn! Salve, salve, salve, Regina! And when our last breath leaves us, O Maria! Show us thy son Christ Jesus, O Maria! Triumph all ye cherubim! Sing with us ye seraphim! Heaven and earth resound the hymn! Salve, salve, salve, Regina!
