= Dolores Zohrab Liebmann =

Ottoman-born American philanthropist

- Դոլորես Զօհրապ
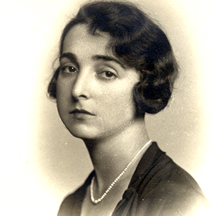
- Born: January 13, 1896; Constantinople, Ottoman Empire
- Died: September 15, 1991 (aged 95); New York City, New York
- Notable work: Dolores Zohrab Liebmann Fund
- Spouse: Henry Liebmann
- Parent(s): Krikor and Clara Zohrab
- Awards: Saint Nerses Shnorali

Dolores Zohrab Liebmann (January 13, 1896 in Istanbul, Ottoman Empire – September 15, 1991 in New York City, US) was an American philanthropist of Armenian descent born in the Ottoman Empire. She established the Dolores Zohrab Liebmann Fund, which distributes fellowships to graduate students.

== Life ==
Dolores Zohrab Liebmann, with Torkom Manoogian (d. 2012), former Primate of the Eastern Diocese and later Patriarch of Jerusalem, and Vazgen I, Catholicos of All Armenians during the opening ceremony of the Zohrab Center in 1987

Dolores Zohrab was born in Constantinople, Ottoman Empire, a daughter of famed writer and a parliament member Krikor Zohrab and his wife Clara. At the age of 19, Dolores Zohrab Liebmann witnessed the arrest and deportation of her father from her family's residence in Constantinople as part of the Armenian genocide. This event would deeply impact her life, for her father would be eventually killed. Dolores, her mother and sister Herminé subsequently fled to Europe via Austria and Romania and arriving in Paris, France in order to reunite with her two brothers Aram and Leon. After the death of her mother, Zohrab moved to Romania, where in 1932 she married an American businessman, Henry L. Liebmann, grandson of Samuel Liebmann of the Jewish American Liebmann family famously associated with the Brooklyn-based Rheingold Beer company. They moved to the United States, and in 1934 Dolores Zohrab Liebmann became a naturalized American citizen.

== Philanthropy ==
In 1950, Henry Liebmann died, and Dolores Zohrab Liebmann devoted the remainder of her life to charitable work, in particular education and research. She made an endowment to support academic programs in Armenian studies, and also established The Krikor and Clara Zohrab Fellowship at Columbia University. She also supported research at the Rockefeller University and the New York Public Library. On November 8, 1987 the Krikor and Clara Zohrab Information Center was established at the Diocese of the Armenian Church of America in New York City. Through its comprehensive library holdings and educational programs, the Center supports research and learning in all areas of Armenian Studies. The inauguration of the Center was attended by Vazgen I, Catholicos of All Armenians, and Archbishop Torkom Manoogian, then the Primate of the Eastern Diocese of the Armenian Church in America and later Armenian Patriarch of Jerusalem.

Dolores Zohrab Liebmann died in 1991, and the Dolores Zohrab Liebmann Fund was established posthumously.

== Legacy ==
She was granted the Saint Nerses Shnorhali Medal from the former Catholicos of All Armenians, Vazgen I.

The philanthropic legacy of Dolores Liebmann is kept alive today and continues to sponsor numerous educational programs and philanthropic activities.
