= Mary Edwards Calhoun =

Calhoun School headmistress

- Born: December 8, 1873; Philadelphia, PA
- Died: November 10, 1963 (age 90); Westport, CT
- Occupation: Educator
- Family: Miss Alice Calhoun (sister), Donald Calhoun (brother), Alfred Calhoun (brother)

Mary Edwards Calhoun (December 8, 1873 – November 10, 1963) was an American schoolteacher. She was the headmistress of the Calhoun School in New York City from 1916 to 1942.

== Biography ==
Calhoun was born in 1873 to Alfred R. Calhoun also known as Major A.R. Calhoun, a Kentucky-born Civil War hero, journalist, and author, and Agnes Edwards Calhoun, born a Philadelphia Quaker, although she later joined the Congregationalist Plymouth Church. Calhoun lived most of her adult life with her sister Alice, a social worker.

In 1893, she graduated from Packer Collegiate Institute in Brooklyn and in 1905 from Teachers College of Columbia University. She taught at Wilson College in 1913, Horace Mann School, Barnard College and Packer. She also was the Women's page editor at the Herald Tribune. During October 1915, Calhoun campaigned as a state organizer in support of the Pennsylvania Suffrage Referendum.

In 1916, she succeeded Laura Jacobi as headmistress at the Jacobi School. Around 1924, the school name was changed to The Calhoun School at the request of parents. Retiring in 1942, Miss Calhoun became chairman of the board, pursued her interests in the World Federation, supported the work of the Society of Friends, and left bequests to Martin Luther King, Jr. and the NAACP as well as to her sister and the educational institutions with which she had been associated.

She wrote Readings from American Literature, a Textbook for Schools and Colleges (1915) which was given mixed reviews by The School Review.

Calhoun died on November 10, 1963, in her Westport home.
