= Krikor Zohrab =

Armenian writer and politician (1861–1915)

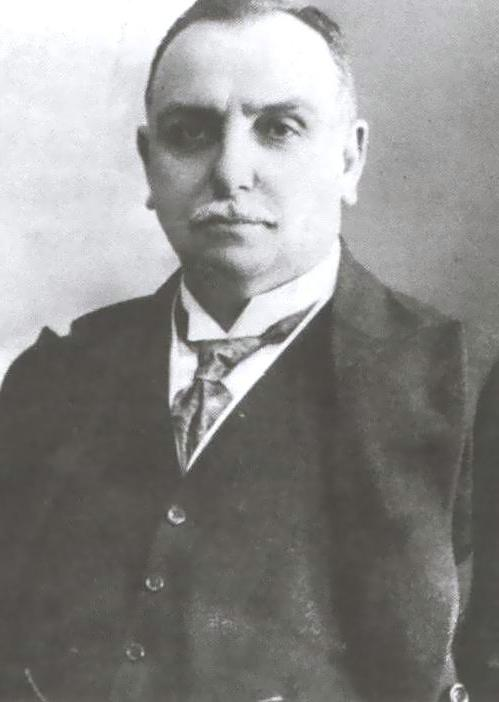

Member of the Chamber of Deputies
- Constituency: Constantinople (1908, 1912, 1914)

Personal details
- Born: June 26, 1861 Constantinople (now Istanbul), Ottoman Empire
- Died: July 20, 1915 (aged 54) Near Urfa, Ottoman Empire
- Citizenship: Ottoman
- Party: Unaffiliated

Krikor Zohrab (Armenian: Գրիգոր Զոհրապ; 26 June 1861 – 1915) was an Armenian writer, politician, and lawyer from Constantinople. At the onset of the Armenian genocide he was arrested by the Turkish government and sent to appear before a military court in Diyarbakır. En route, at a locality called Karaköprü or Şeytanderesi on the outskirts of Urfa, he was murdered by a band of known brigands under the leadership of Çerkez Ahmet, Halil and Nazım some time between 15 and 20 July 1915.

== Life ==
Zohrab was born into a wealthy family in Beşiktaş, Constantinople on 26 June 1861. His early education was completed at a local Armenian Catholic school. He graduated from Galatasaray High School with a degree in civil engineering, but did not go on to work in that field. Instead, he enrolled in a newly opened law school, the Imperial University of Jurisprudence (today: Istanbul University Faculty of Law), and received his law degree in 1882.

Zohrab became a known lawyer in the courts of the Ottoman Empire. He later became a professor of law at the university. At age 27, Zohrab married Clara Yazejian, and fathered two daughters and two sons. One of the daughters, Dolores Zohrab Liebmann, eventually became an American philanthropist.

Krikor Zohrab was successful in defending many Armenians charged with a variety of political and criminal offenses between 1895-96. During the defense of a Bulgarian revolutionary he accused a Turkish official of torture. As a result, he was disbarred and forced to live abroad.

In 1908, following the revolution of the Young Turks, Zohrab became a member of parliament in the Ottoman Council, and also served his community as an Armenian councilor.

=== Personality and lifestyle ===
Zohrab was an intellectual with a busy life. Although Zohrab was usually open to progressive ideas, he was conservative on women's role in society. He believed that women should keep their traditional roles and not venture further.

=== Political activity ===
As a teenager, Zohrab showed significant interest in national work and contributed to his community. At the age of 30, he was chosen to be part of the national council of Constantinople and served on the council until his death. He was one of the first victims of the Armenian genocide.

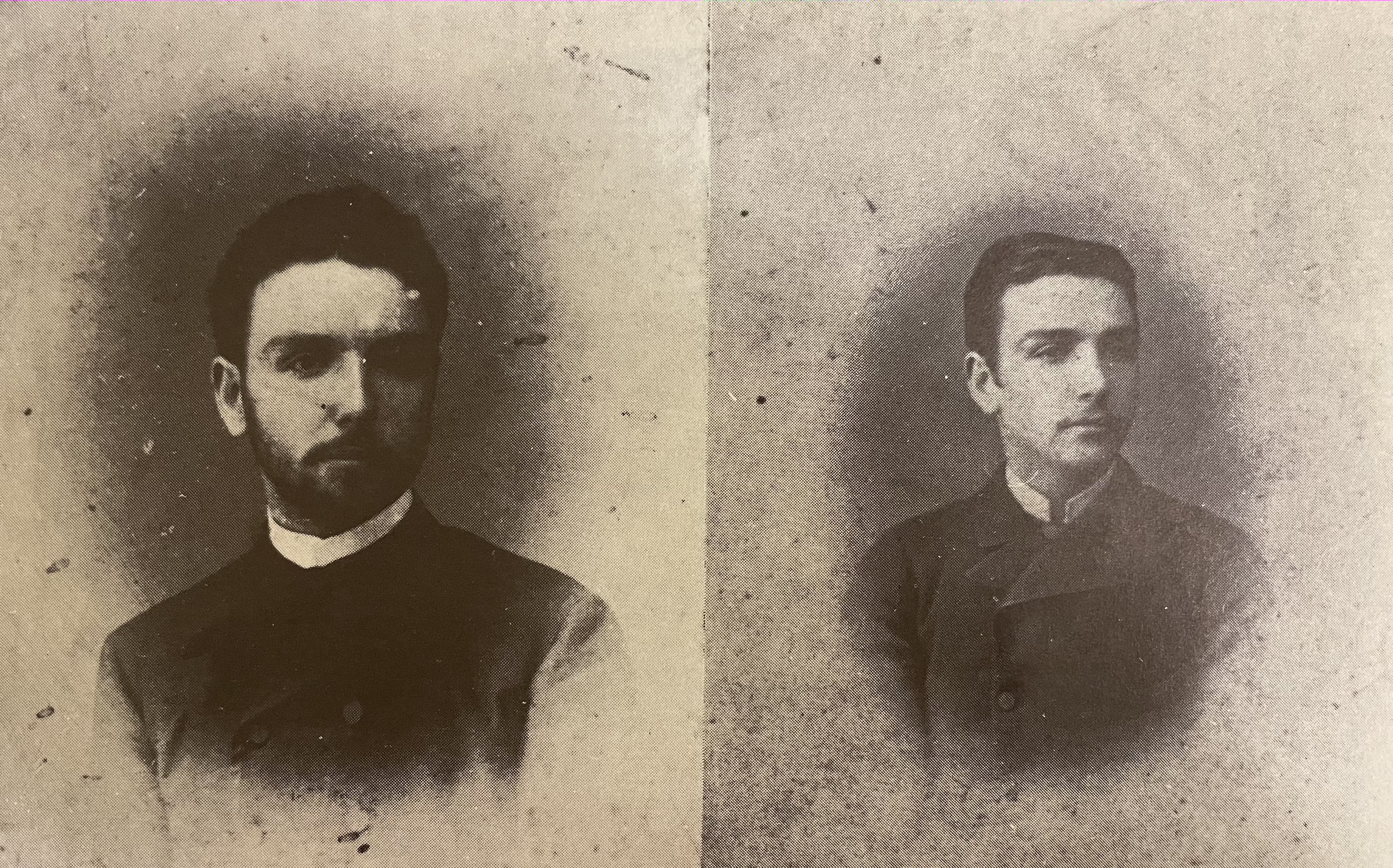
Young Krikor Zohrab, undated photos

From 1908 onwards, Zohrab was a member of Ottoman Parliament and known for his eloquent speeches. He vehemently defended Armenian interests and rights inside the council and at all levels of the government. In 1909, during the Adana massacre, he strongly criticized the Turkish authorities for their actions and demanded that those responsible be brought to justice.

To serve the Armenian cause, Zohrab wrote a paper in French called "La question arménienne à la lumière des documents" (The Armenian question in light of documents), published in 1913 under the pseudonym Marcel Léart in Paris. It dealt with aspects of the hardships endured by the Armenian populace and denounced the government's inaction.

=== Publications ===
Zohrab wrote many articles in Armenian daily newspapers such as Masis (Մասիս), Hairenik (Հայրենիք), and Arevelk (Armenian: Արեւելք). One of his famous articles, entitled "Broom," criticized Armenian nationals and works saying they needed some "sweeping" to bring them back to order.

== Writing style ==
La Question arménienne, written by Zohrab using the pen name Marcel Léart

Zohrab is often regarded as a pioneering figure in the Armenian short story tradition. He was influenced by the French realism movement propelled by such writers as Guy de Maupassant, Alphonse Daudet and Émile Zola.

Zohrab drew heavily on his own experiences. His writing frequently focused on the physical and psychological characteristics of his subjects, conveying personality through descriptions of faces and gestures. His prose style tended toward brevity and compression, using short, dense passages to depict tragedy or illustrate character.

== Arrest and assassination ==
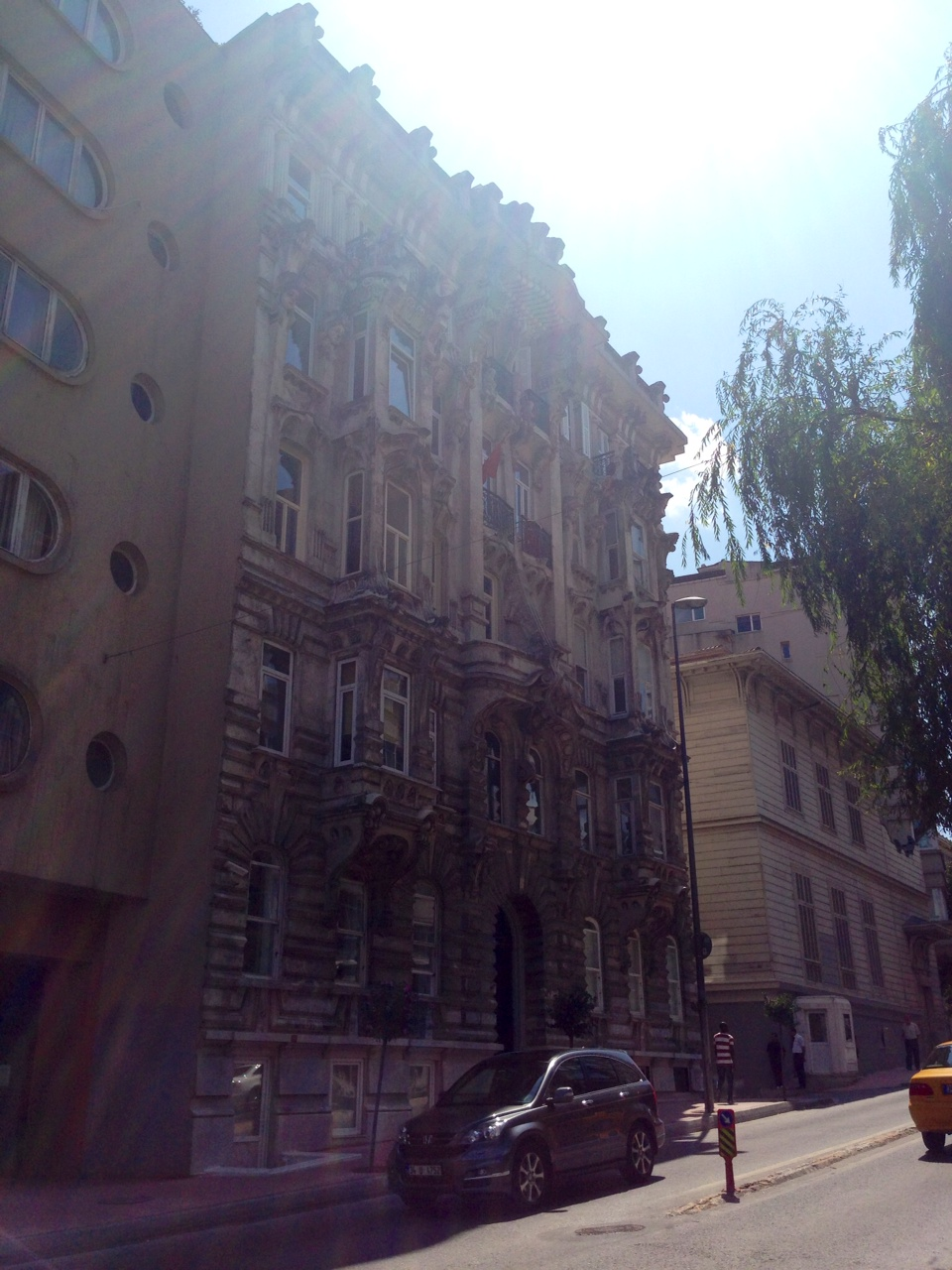
Residence of Krikor Zohrab, Istanbul

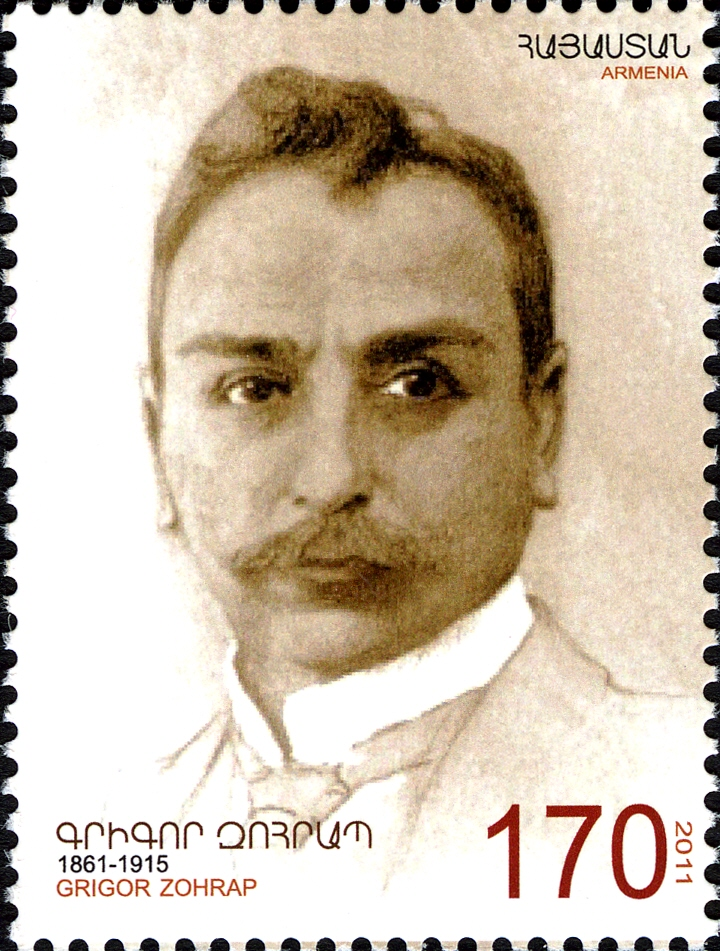
Krikor Zohrab, stamp of the Armenian Post, 2011.

During the mass arrests and execution that would signal the start of the Armenian Genocide in and around 24 April 1915, Zohrab was working to try to stop the atrocities. As a member of Parliament, he tried to contact the Turkish authorities and to plea for the immediate cessation of the massacres. He even contacted his supposed friend Talaat Pasha to protest and asked for redress, but to no avail. On 1 June 1915, he demanded explanations for the massacres inflicted on the Armenians in the eastern provinces from both Talaat and the secretary general of the Committee for Union and Progress (CUP) Mithat Şükrü Bleda and mentioned that one day he would demand an explanation for these actions in the Ottoman Parliament. This would be the last time they would meet. Some integrants within his immediate circle strongly encouraged him to leave the country, but Zohrab refused.

On the 2 June 1915, Zohrab was arrested by the Turks; Vartkes Serengülian, another deputy to the Ottoman Parliament, was arrested at the same time. Ordered to appear before a court martial in Diyarbakır, they traveled together by train to Aleppo, escorted by one gendarme. They remained in Aleppo for a few weeks, waiting for the results of attempts by the Ottoman governor of the city to have them sent back to the capital. Some sources state that Cemal Pasha himself tried to secure their return, but Talaat Pasha insisted on having the pair court martialed. They were then dispatched to Urfa and remained there for some time in the house of a Turkish deputy friend. Later, they were taken under police escort and taken to Diyarbakır by car. They were murdered by the well-known band of brigands led by Cherkes Ahmet, Halil and Nazım, at a locality called Karaköprü or Şeytanderesi in the outskirts of Urfa, some time between 15 July and 20 July 1915. The murderers were tried and executed in Damascus by Cemal Pasha in September 1915, and the assassinations became the subject of a 1916 investigation by the Ottoman Parliament led by Artin Boshgezenian, the deputy for Aleppo.

== Works ==
Some of Zohrab's published writings are:

- A Vanished Generation (Անհետացած սերունդ մը) is one of his works. Considered a great piece of realist writing.
- Familiar Faces (Ծանօթ դէմքեր), a piece where he draws portraits of prominent figures of his time.
- From the Journeyman's Diary (Ուղեւորի օրագրէն), a book about European travels and the impressions they left on him.
- Criminal Law (Hukuk-ı Ceza), the courses he gave at the Faculty of Law were published as a book under the name Hukuk-ı Ceza in 1909. This book was republished by Lawyer Tugay Aydın in 2025.

Zohrab was particularly well known for his short stories, most of which were collected in the following three volumes:

- Voices of Conscience (Խղճմտանքի ձայներ) (1909)
- Life As It Is (Կեանքը ինչպէս որ է) (1911)
- Silent Griefs Լուռ ցաւեր (1911)

== See also ==
- Armenian genocide
- Deportation of Armenian intellectuals on 24 April 1915
