= Aufhausen Priory =

Monastery in Bavaria, Germany

Coordinates: 48°52′23″N 12°17′04″E

Aufhausen Priory (German: Kloster Aufhausen), formerly the Aufhausen Oratory, was a Benedictine monastery located at Aufhausen near Regensburg in Bavaria, Germany. It once again houses an Oratorian community.

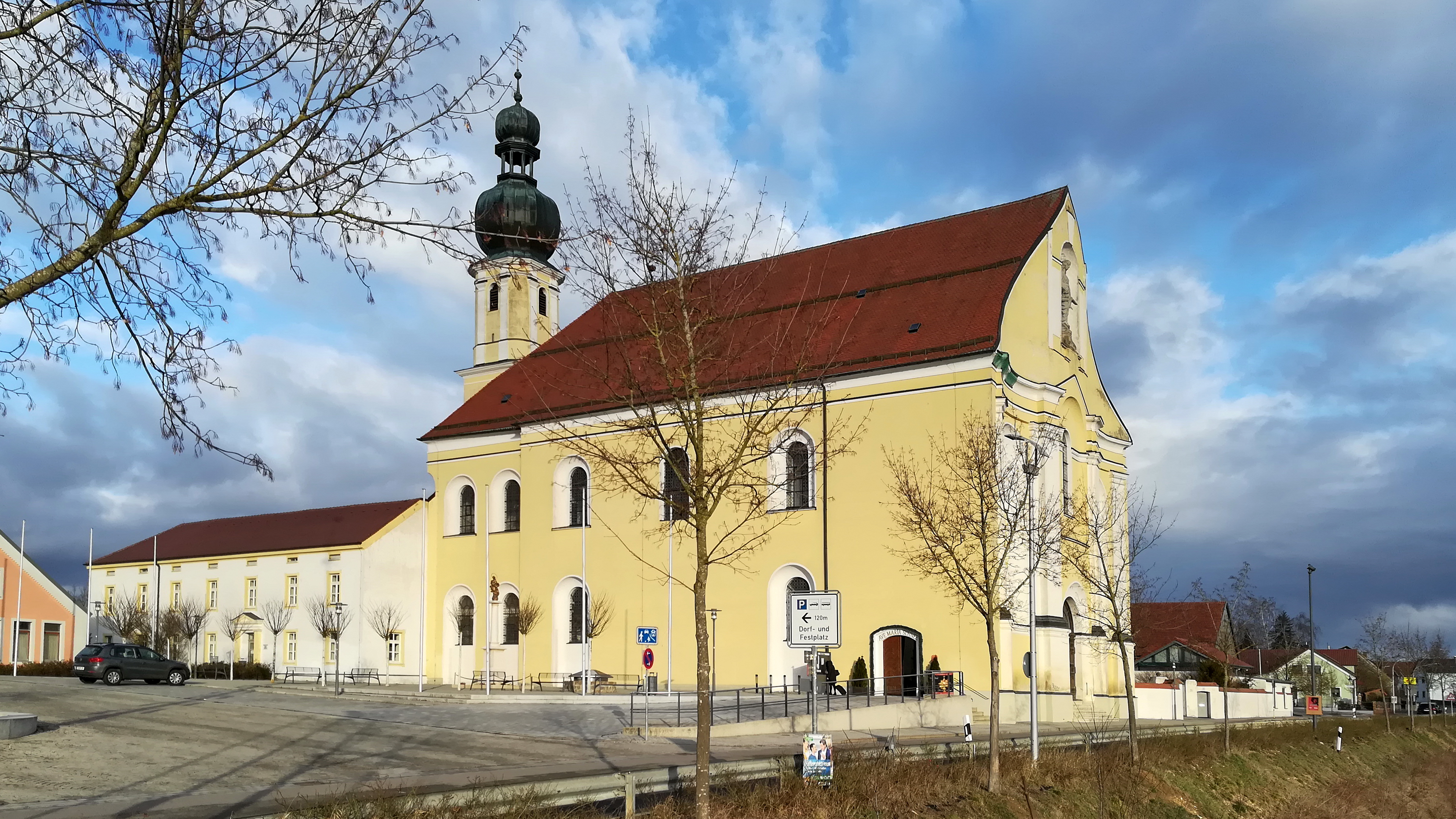
Maria Schnee Aufhausen

The original community, dedicated to Our Lady of the Snows, was founded in the late 17th century as an Oratorian community by the local priest, Johann Georg Seidenbusch. He became the first Provost of the Aufhausen Priory. At Seidenbusch's death in December 1729, he left behind a lively community based on the ideal of Saint Philip Neri, and an active place of pilgrimage.

The priory was not dissolved during the secularisation of Bavaria in 1802–03, but remained under the title "Königliches Nerianerinstitut" (Royal Nerian Institute), at least until 1829. The last provost died in 1886.

It was re-settled in 1890 from the Benedictine abbey at Metten, and partly re-built. In 1978 the priory was abandoned again.

Since 2006, Aufhausen has been home to a branch of the Brothers of the Holy Blood (FSS) founded by Father Winfried M. Wermter, to whom the Bishop of Regensburg entrusted the parish for pastoral care. In 2012 the Congregation of the Oratory of St. Philip Neri in Aufhausen, emerged from the community of the "Brothers of the Most Holy Blood" (FSS).
