= Calhoun School =

Private school in New York City

The Calhoun School
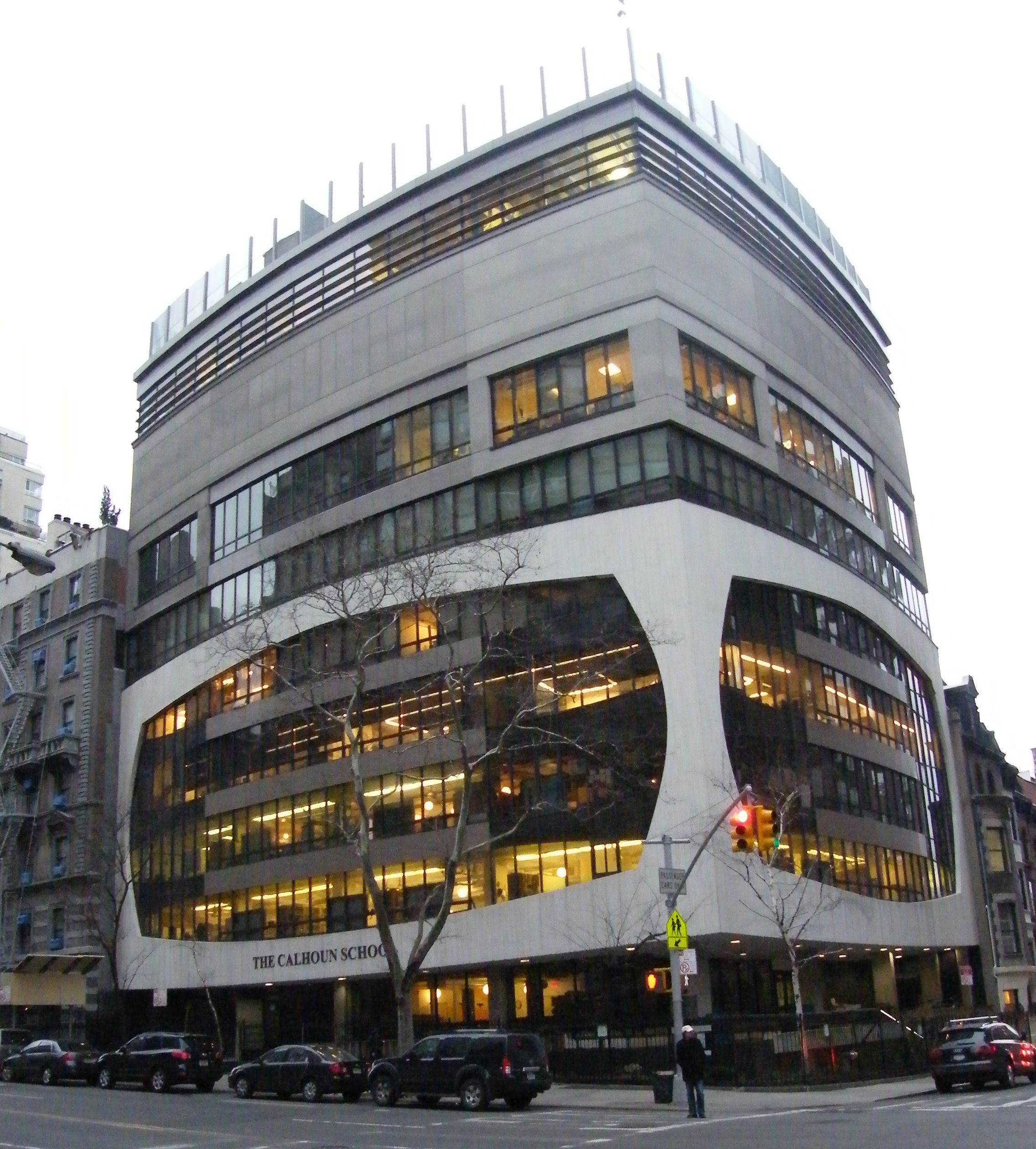

Location
- 40°47′08″N 73°58′50″W

Information
- Type: Private
- Established: 1896
- Founder: Laura Jacobi
- Headmaster: Celeste Herrera
- Grades: 3 years old through 12th grade
- Enrollment: approximately 600
- Campus: Urban
- Color: Green
- Mascot: Cougar
- Affiliations: NAIS
- Lower School Location: 325 West 85th Street, New York, New York 10024, US
- Main School Location: 433 West End Avenue, New York, New York 10024 US
- Average Class Size: 12–15
- Student to Teacher Ratio: 6:1
- Website: www.calhoun.org

The Calhoun School is a progressive, co-educational, independent school on New York City's Upper West Side, serving students from Pre-K through 12th grade. Founded in 1896, the school currently has approximately 600 students, housed in two separate buildings.

== History ==
In 1896, The Calhoun School was founded by Laura Jacobi as the Jacobi School in a brownstone at 158–160 West 80th Street. Miss Jacobi came to America from Germany with the help of her uncle, Dr. Abraham Jacobi, professor of pediatrics at New York Medical College and Columbia. Through her uncle and her aunt, Miss Jacobi was exposed to a progressive circle committed to women's rights, community health and civil reform. Initially, Miss Jacobi began her program as a "brother-and-sister" school, counting among its first students the son and daughter of Franz Boas, one of the founders of American cultural anthropology. It gradually evolved into a girls' school, attracting the daughters of socially prominent Jewish families, including Peggy Guggenheim, the children of the Morgenthaus and the Strausses. The school's nonsectarian curriculum emphasized languages and history. Eleanor Steiner Gimbel remembered Miss Jacobi's commitment to civil liberties and her "teaching of race understanding as one of the high points of her school days."

In 1916, Laura Jacobi chose Mary Edwards Calhoun to succeed her as headmistress. A member of a Philadelphia Quaker family, Miss Calhoun was a former editor of the Women's Page at the Herald Tribune as well as a teacher at various schools before coming to The Jacobi School. Ella Cannon, a former employee with the National Women's Suffrage Publishing Company, was hired to teach economics and, in 1923, was named co-headmistress. The school was renamed after its beloved headmistress, Mary Calhoun, in 1924. In 1939, Calhoun incorporated the school as a non-profit institution. She retired in 1942; Cannon continued as Head until her retirement in 1946, after which Elizabeth Parmelee and Beatrice Cosmey became co-headmistresses—remaining in that position until their retirement in 1969. Philip (Pem) E. McCurdy was selected by the Board to be the first male Head of School, and was given a mandate to guide Calhoun's transformation into a fully coeducational school (1971). Pem's initiatives were completed under the leadership of Eugene Ruth, who completed Calhoun's transformation to a progressive educational institution dedicated to "learner-centered instruction and independent learning" based on an understanding of "individual differences" in learning styles.

The building opened at 433 West End Avenue at 81st Street in the spring of 1975, and the first coed class graduated that June. Under Head of School Steve Nelson, a major capital campaign was completed in 2004 that added five floors to the main building; another construction project completed in 2014 redesigned the school's facade, lobby, library and learning resource center, and expanded the lunchroom.

Calhoun's 11th Head of School, Steven Solnick, joined the school in July 2017. During his seven-year tenure, he led Calhoun through the COVID-19 pandemic and oversaw the school's merger with Metropolitan Montessori School in July 2023. The merger resulted in the school's dual-track Lower School program, which offers the choice of two tracks for children in preschool through 3rd grade: Montessori and Open Inquiry.

In July 2024, Celeste Herrera became Calhoun's 12th Head of School.

== Athletics ==
Calhoun offers an extensive physical education program that promotes team play and individual fitness, and a full roster of interscholastic sports under the auspices of the New York City Athletic League (NYCAL). The Girls' Volleyball JV and Varsity teams, in particular, have been a consistent, dominant force in the league, capturing NYCAL league and championship tournament titles over the course of ten consecutive years. Basketball teams have frequently qualified for NYCAL championships and state tournaments, with several standout athletes leading the helm. Students also excel in track-and-field: their performance frequently takes them to the New York State Championships, where they've taken medals in the 100- and 400-meter races as well as the 4x100 meter relay.

== "No Walls" ==
Classes for Calhoun's preschoolers—young 3's (entering at 2 years 8 months) – through fourth graders are held in the Lower School building at 325 West 85th Street between West End Avenue and Riverside Drive. Calhoun's Lower School, previously housed at 74th Street, moved to its current location as part of its merger with Metropolitan Montessori School. Beginning in the 2025–2026 school year, Calhoun's Lower School will gradually transition to a unified, Montessori-inspired program for all students from preschool through 3rd grade, with 4th grade serving as a transition year to Middle School.

Grades 5–12 are taught in the Main Building, located at 433 West End Avenue, at 81st Street. Originally completed in 1975, the building was designed by Costas Machlouzarides. When first built, the iconic building was frequently referred to as the "TV" school because of the design of the façade. With a major renovation in 2004 that added four new floors, and a second street-level renovation completed in 2014, the school building's unique design was modernized while still retaining its 1970s roots.

Instead of halls and classrooms with doors, the academic floors are divided into open areas separated by bookshelves, dividers, and flexible walls.

== Architecture ==
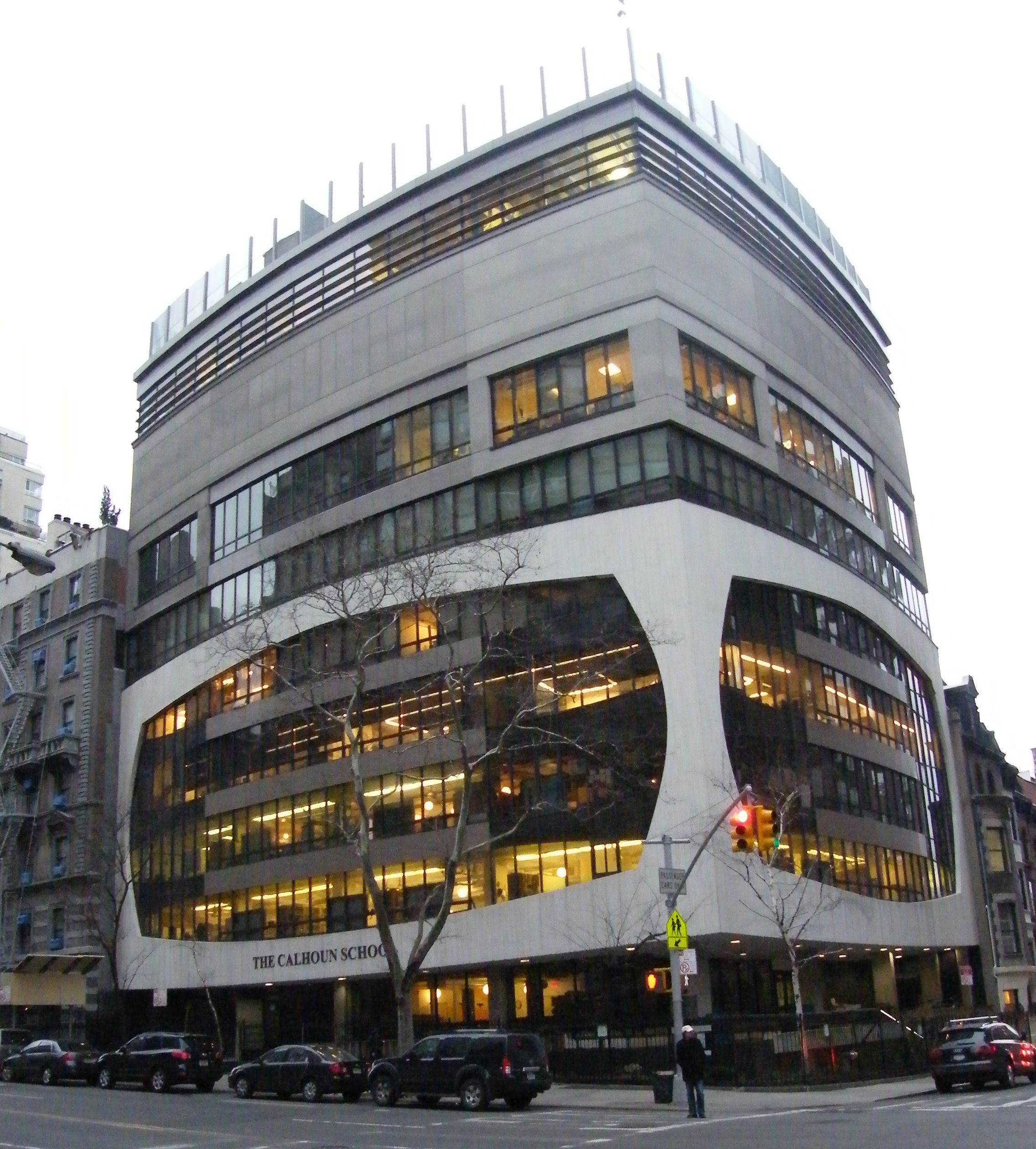
2009

Once called the television building because of its former façade, Calhoun's original building at 81st Street was completed in 1975 and designed by Costas Machlouzarides. In 2000, The Calhoun School hired New York-based architecture firm FXFOWLE to design a four-story addition, which was completed for the 2004 school year. DesignShare, a journal of educational facilities planning, called the four-floor addition a "courageous design," with special mention of the School's Green Roof as "an innovation in the architecture for learning." The Green Roof and FXFOWLE were named DesignShare's recipients of a 2007 Merit Award—one of only seven recipients worldwide to receive the award. In fact, the Green Roof has attracted international attention and acclaim, with architects and educators coming from as far away as Japan, Brazil, Italy, Ireland, and Great Britain to see how the school has taken a leadership position in green architecture and sustainability. Ten years later, in the summer of 2014, the school began another 3-month renovation project of the 81st Street building with FXFOWLE, to expand the interior of the first floor by enclosing an outdoor plaza. The result had a significant—and positive—impact on the face of the iconic building while maintaining the "overhang" effect that—when first built in the 1970s—people claimed looked like a Brownie camera flash cube or a television set.

The September 2004 renovation added to the original building:

- A full-sized gym and weight room
- A performing arts center with theater and music rehearsal rooms
- Three fully equipped science labs
- A greatly expanded art studio with kiln, darkroom and woodshop
- An eco-friendly Green Roof Learning Center that also provides programmable space for educational purposes, light recreation, and the school's herb and vegetable garden (for the school's nutritious lunch program).

Calhoun completed a 3-month renovation project in September 2014 that included expansion of the first floor for a kitchen facility and multi-purpose lunch room/events space; and renovation of the ground floor for the school's library resource center and offices.

In the summer of 2022, the 4th and 7th floors were renovated.

== Performing arts ==
Calhoun's Mary Lea Johnson Performing Arts Center is used for student productions, assemblies, and school events, as well as for Calhoun's Performing Arts Series, open to the public. The yearly series hosts professional Children's Theater, Music Concerts, Dance, Documentary Films, and Town Hall Meetings and Lectures, all at nominal cost and all open to the public. Students and faculty have the added benefit of meeting with many of these artists and guest speakers prior to the events, in class or specially arranged assembly programs.

== Notable alumni ==
- Grace Borgenicht Brandt, art dealer
- Toby Emmerich, 1981, producer, film executive, and screenwriter
- Elinor S. Gimbel, progressive leader and women's rights activist
- Peggy Guggenheim, 1915, arts patron, bohemian, and socialite
- Cooper Hoffman, 2021, actor
- Kristin Richardson Jordan, 2005, New York City council member
- David Karp, founder of Tumblr
- Nora Benjamin Kubie, 1916, author, artist, and amateur archaeologist
- Elinor Morgenthau, Democratic Party activist and wife of Henry Morgenthau Jr.
- Suzi Oppenheimer, New York State Senator
- Jordan Peele, 1997, comedian, actor, and film director
- Tiffany Poon, 2014, classical pianist and YouTuber
- Allyson Young Schwartz, 1966, Member of Congress
- Faith Seidenberg, 1923, lawyer and activist
- Jake Shane, influencer and comedian
- Ben Stiller, 1983, comedian, actor, and film director
- Wendy Wasserstein, 1967, playwright and author
- Maggie Wheeler (née Jakobson), actress
- Laurie Wolf, food writer and entrepreneur
