= Samuel Liebmann =

German-American brewer (1799–1872)

- Born: November 12, 1799; Aufhausen, Bopfingen, Württemberg
- Died: November 21, 1872 (age 73); Williamsburg, New York, US
- Occupation: Businessman
- Known for: Founder of S. Liebmann Brewery
- Spouse: Sara Selz
- Children: Bertha Liebmann Stein; Rosa Liebmann Obermeyer; Charles Liebmann; Joseph Liebmann; Fanny Liebmann; Henry Liebmann

Samuel Liebmann (November 12, 1799 – November 21, 1872) was a German-born American brewer and founder of S. Liebmann Brewery (later Rheingold Breweries) in Brooklyn, New York. Introduced after his death, the main brand Rheingold Extra Dry was one of the most popular beer brands in New York City in the 1940s to 1960s.

== Biography ==
Samuel Liebmann was born to a Jewish family in 1799 in the Aufhausen, a district of the municipality of Bopfingen, the son of Berta (née Fröhlich) and Joseph Liebmann. His father was a merchant and religious instructor. He had three brothers (Heinrich, David, and Leopold) and two sisters (Johanna, Sarah) and attended elementary school in Aufhausen. After the death of his father in 1832, Liebmann and his brother Heinrich left their hometown and bought the estate Schloss Schmiedelfeld which they operated with economic success.

Liebmann moved to Ludwigsburg in 1840. There he acquired the Gasthaus "Zum Stern" with attached brewery, which he also led successfully. He was a supporter of the revolutionary movement during the German Revolution which led to the government banning royal soldiers, the majority of his clientele, from visiting his establishment. This combined with the failure of the revolution led to his immigration to the United States. In 1850, he sent his son Joseph Liebmann to America to build a home; in 1854, he officially immigrated with the rest of his family to New York City.

He leased the Maasche Brewery on Meserole Street in Williamsburg, Brooklyn which he renamed as the S. Liebmann Brewery. After the lease expired, he established a new brewery under the same name on the corner of Forest and Bremen Street in Bushwick. Three years after the death of his wife in 1865, he retired from active management of the brewery giving the management of the brewery to his sons.

== Personal life ==
In June 1828, Liebmann married Sara Wasserman Selz. They had six children:

- Bertha Liebmann Stein (born June 28, 1827), married Samuel Stein in 1859
- Rosa Liebmann Obermeyer (born July 28, 1829), married David Obermeyer in 1858, 7 children
  - Frederick Obermeyer (born 1859), died as a child
  - Theodore Obermeyer (born July 26, 1861), married Bertha Heller
  - Ernst Obermeyer (born December 20, 1863), married Henrietta Harris
  - Joseph Obermeyer (born May 20, 1865)
  - Edwin Obermeyer
  - Robert Obermeyer
  - Emmeline Obermeyer (born October 27, 1873), married to photographer Alfred Stieglitz
- Joseph Liebmann (December 20, 1831 – March 26, 1913 in New York City)
- Fanny Liebmann (born March 27, 1833), married Joseph Liebmann (her father's cousin) in 1861, 7 children
  - Betty Liebmann (born January 1, 1862), married Myron J. Fuerst
  - Clara Liebmann (born January 26, 1865), married Julius Rosenfeld, parents to writer Paul Rosenfeld
  - Sarah Liebmann (born January 11, 1864), married Leopold Cohn
  - Henry L. Liebmann, married Clara von Ende, divorced and remarried to Dolores Zohrab Liebmann
  - Lily Liebmann (born November 21, 1867), married Carl Gutmann
  - Martha Liebmann (born September 28, 1873), never married
  - Johanna Liebmann, died in infancy
- Henry Liebmann (December 6, 1836 – March 27, 1915 in New York City)
- Charles Liebmann (November 16, 1837 – June 12, 1928 in New York City)

Samuel Liebmann died in 1872 in his house in Williamsburg, Brooklyn. He is buried in Cypress Hills Cemetery in Brooklyn.
