= Johann Georg Seidenbusch =

German priest (1641–1729)

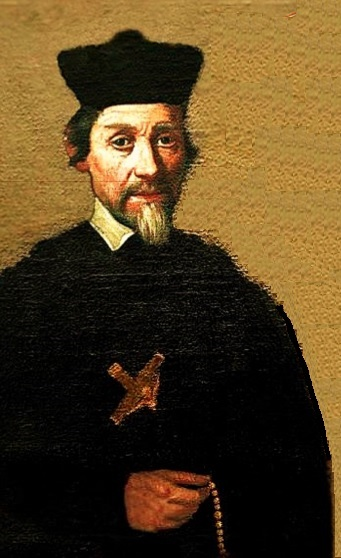
Seidenbusch, from a stained glass window at Aufhausen

Johann Georg Seidenbusch (5 April 1641 – 10 December 1729) was a Bavarian priest, painter, and composer, an influential figure in the religious landscape of the Baroque period. His life's work was in the creation of the oratory of Aufhausen Priory, of which he was the first Provost.

In 2015, Seidenbusch was declared to be a Servant of God, a step towards canonization.

== Early life ==
Born in the Sendlingergasse in Munich, then in the Electorate of Bavaria of the Holy Roman Empire, Seidenbusch was the son of a clothier and was baptized in St Peter's Church. He grew up in his father’s middle-class household, where he developed a love of Christ and the Church.

Some seventy years later, Seidenbusch recalled in his autobiography

Even as a small boy, when my mother was spinning and my father was doing needlework, I would get up on the stove or the bench and start preaching, which made my parents happy. My father once asked: "My child, what do you want to do when you grow up?" I answered: "I want to be a pastor, so that I can preach!"

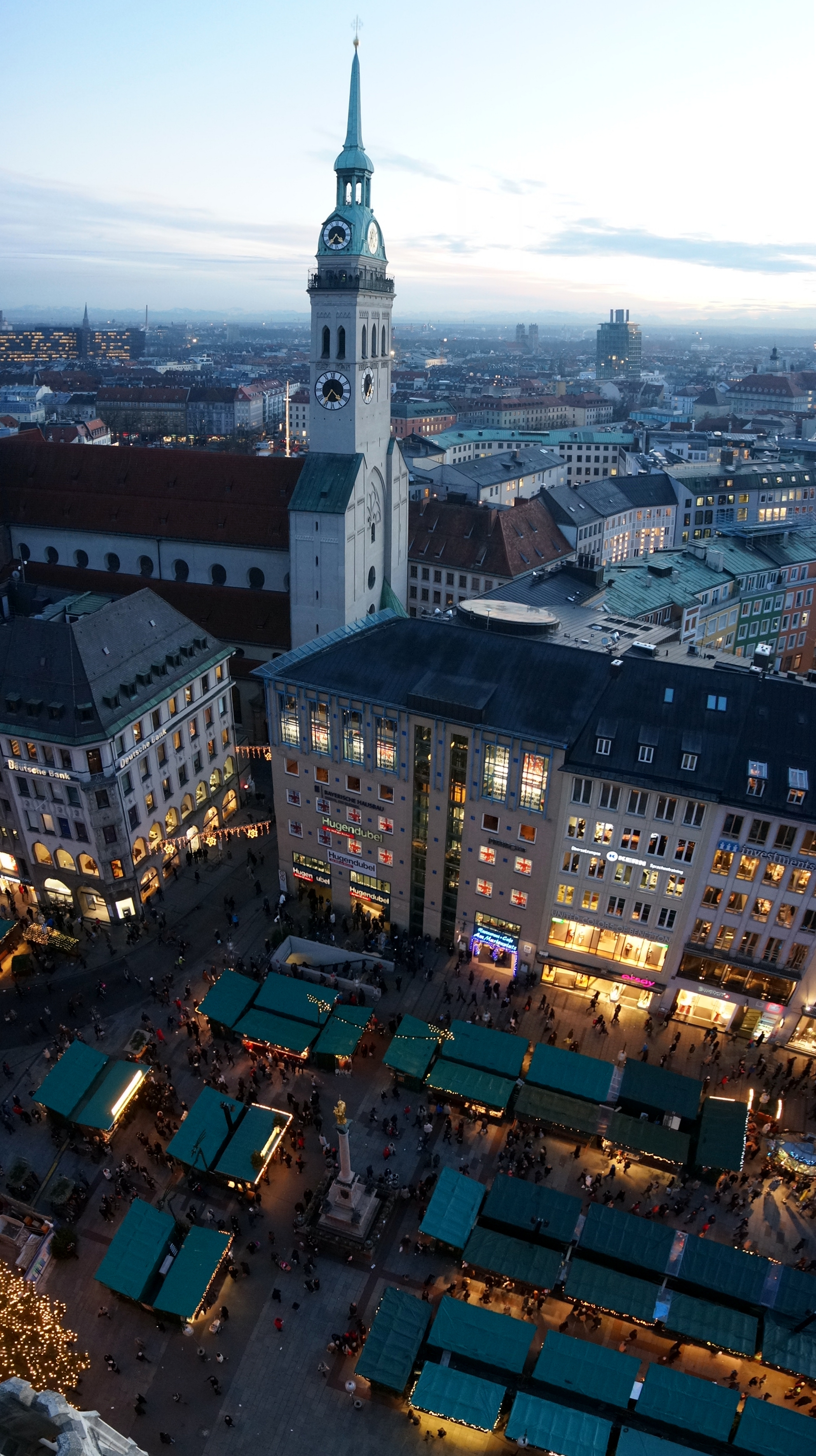
St Peter’s, Munich

From 1651, Seidenbusch was educated at the Jesuit Gymnasium, or high school, of Munich, later known as the Wilhelmsgymnasium, where he began to draw and paint. At the age of ten, in the hall of the school, he saw for the first time the statue of the Virgin Mary which later played a great part in his life. One day, he found it under the stairs, as a new larger figure had been acquired. He became a zealous sodalist among the thriving Marian Student Congregation at the school and was also in demand as a painter. In 1658, when he was seventeen, he helped to decorate the city for the visit of Leopold I, Holy Roman Emperor. He did so well at this work that he was invited to say what he would like as a reward and chose the disused statue. To his great surprise, he was given it by the principal, Father Adam Schirmbeck.

While he was still at the high school, Seidenbusch's Marian devotions reached a new level, by the spontaneous step of a personal spiritual marriage with her. This was prompted by a distinguished wedding he attended at St Peter’s. It hurt him to see how in the church the guests took care of outward appearances, but nobody really prayed. He was drawn to the nearby altar of St Mary and declared to her "ad carissimam Sponsam te eligo" (transl. I choose thee as my dearest Bride). He completed his school years in 1659.

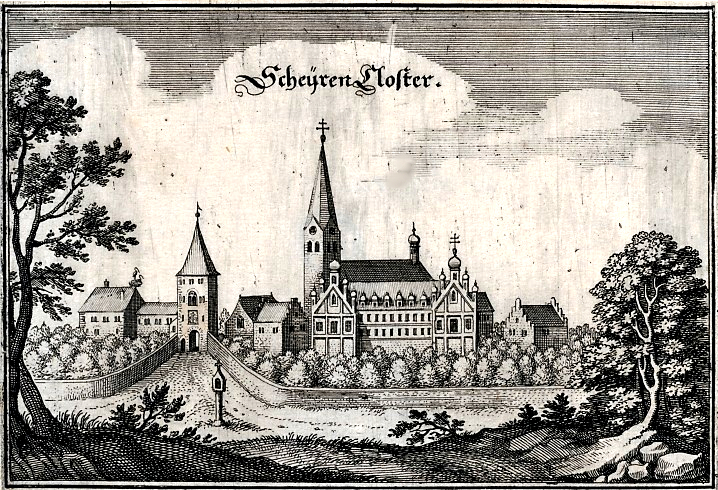
Scheyern, c. 1644

Seidenbusch next served as the Abbot's servant and as a painter at Scheyern Abbey, where, impressed by his painting skills, Joachim von Sandrart invited him to come to his school. But Seidenbusch declined, preferring to become a priest. During his stay at Scheyern Abbey, a widow there gave him a Cross. In 1661 he left for Ingolstadt to study theology and philosophy and was ordained a priest in Freising Cathedral in 1666.

== Career ==
As a young priest, one year after his ordination, Seidenbusch went to live in Aufhausen near the free imperial city of Ratisbon, to take up an appointment as a pastor. He travelled to Aufhausen by raft on the River Isar, taking with him his mother and his younger siblings, and also his small statue of the Virgin Mary and the Cross from Scheyern. The raft was twice in danger, once when it hit the remains of a former bridge, but Seidenbusch believed that thanks for all dangers being overcome were owed to the statue. In May 1668, in Aufhausen, he inaugurated a small wooden chapel, which he adorned with the Scheyern Cross and later also with the statue of the Virgin Mary.

Between 1670 and 1672, Seidenbusch used his share of the money from the sale of his parents' house in Munich to build a new church of pilgrimage in his parish. He also received contributions from farmers, noblemen, and the Bishop of Ratisbon. The church was dedicated to Our Lady of the Snows.

In Aufhausen, Seidenbusch developed a deep piety and sense of pastoral care, as well as a love of the art of painting.

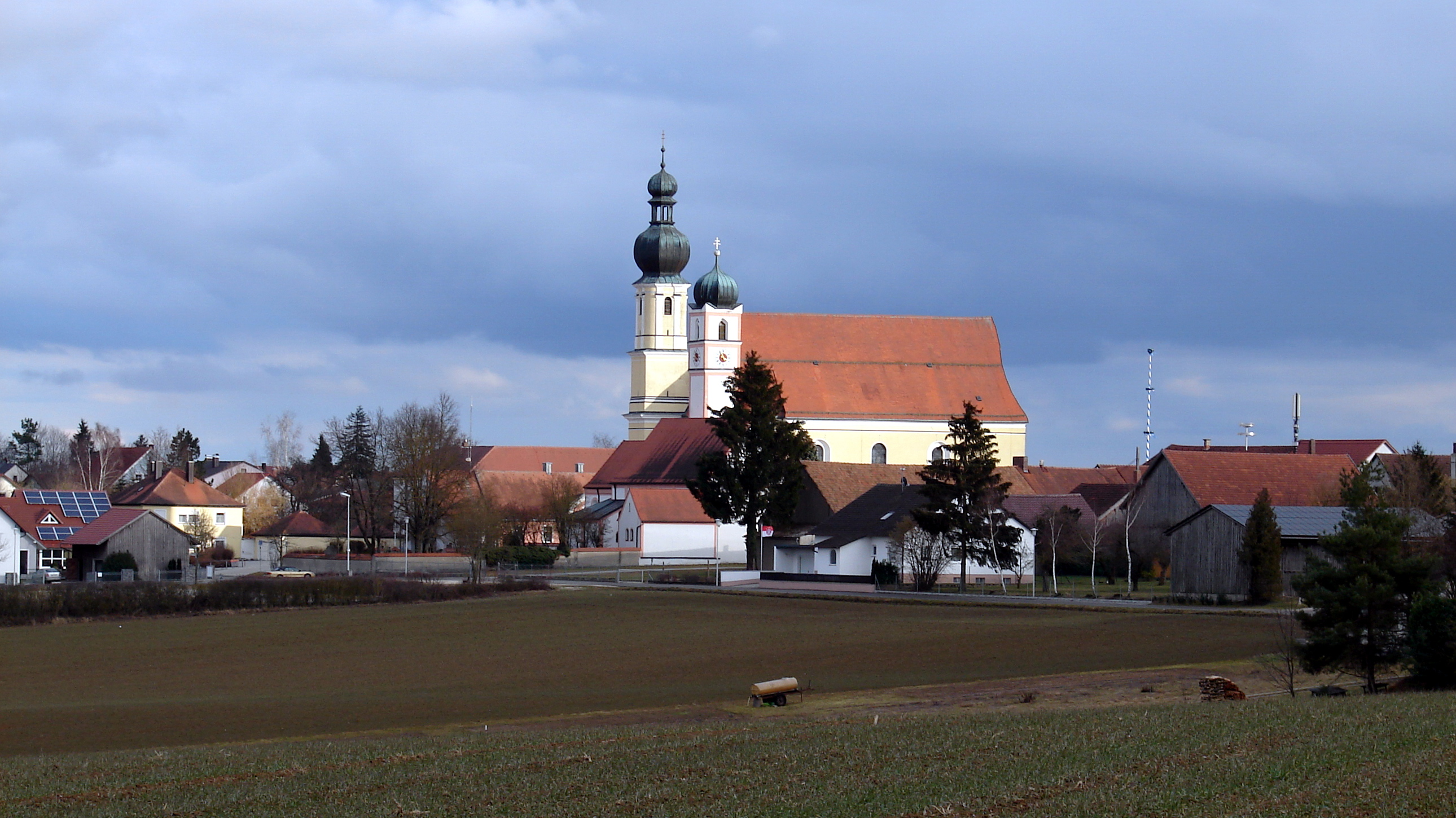
Our Lady of the Snows, Aufhausen

At the Viennese imperial court of Leopold I, the paintings and drawings of Seidenbusch, including portraits, found admirers, and he gained a friendship with the Habsburgs. He gave painting lessons to the former Empress Eleonora and became very popular at the Emperor’s court as a composer, and the imperial family encouraged the printing of the first edition of his sacred hymns.

About 1672, Seidenbusch established a kind of vita communis with his assistant priests, and in 1675 he visited Rome and entered the community of Oratorians founded by Saint Philip Neri at the Santissima Trinità dei Pellegrini. In the same year, he established the oratory of Aufhausen Priory, the first of Saint Philip Neri in the German-speaking world.

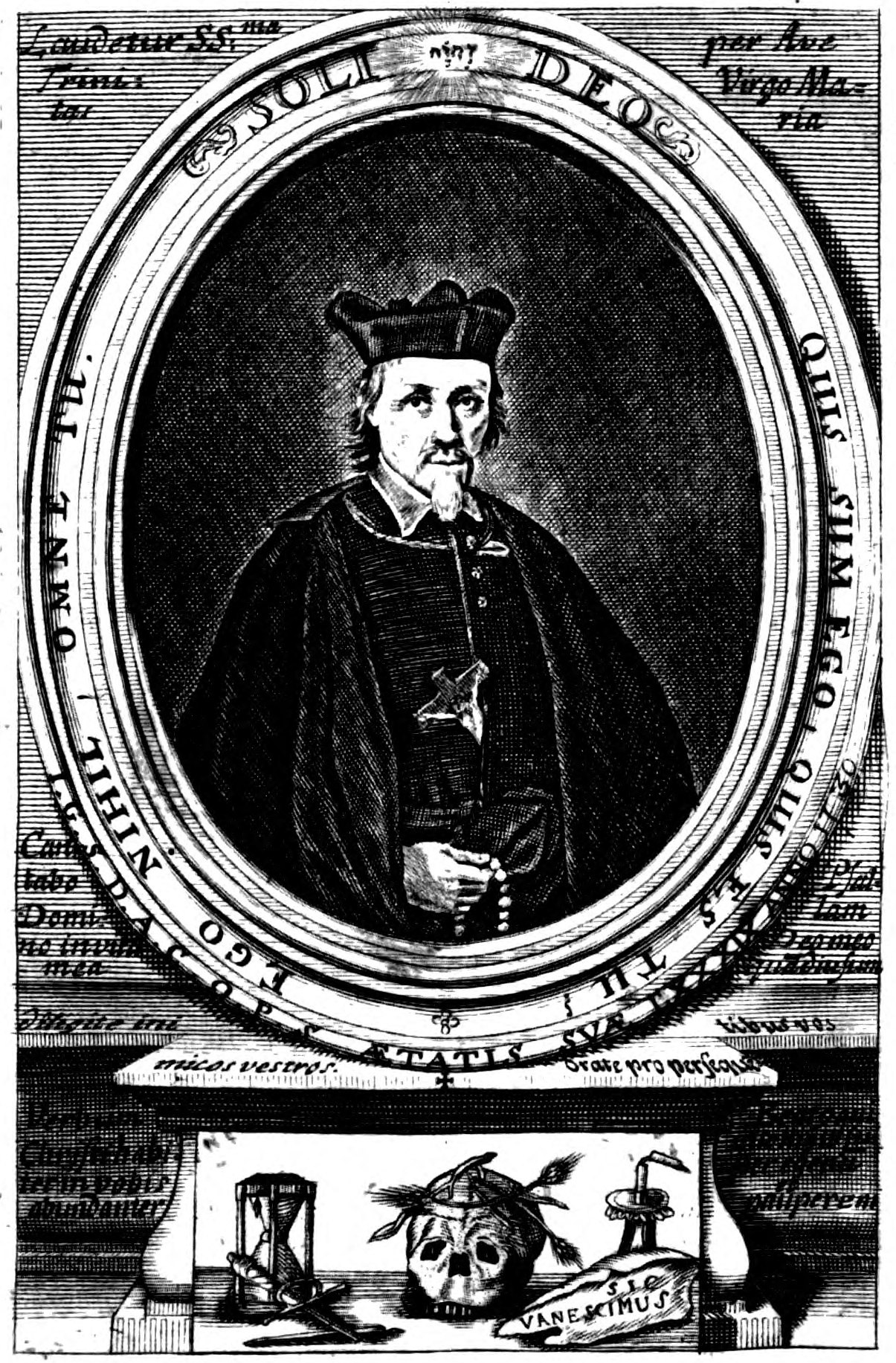
An engraved portrait, 1730

His published work of 1687, Marianischer Schnee-Berg ("Marian Snow-Mountain") included the first form of the Salve Regina song Gegrüßet seist du, Königin ("Greetings to thee, O Queen").

In 1695, Seidenbusch went to Rome again for the centenary of the death of Neri, and while he was there he received the recognition of his Congregation at Aufhausen by Pope Innocent XII. Seidenbusch became the first Provost of the Aufhausen Priory. This led to his organizing other oratories, one in Vienna in 1701 and another in Munich in 1702.

In 1705, during the War of the Spanish Succession, there was fighting in Bavaria, and Seidenbusch was able to obtain for his parish a letter of protection from the emperor.

When Seidenbusch died in December 1729, he left behind him a lively community based on the ideal of Saint Philip Neri, and also an active place of pilgrimage. His autobiography is entertaining and is a valuable historical document.

The Deutsche Biographie says of Seidenbusch that he is an outstanding example of the many pastors in Bavaria who were also writers and poets. Some songs from his much-used "Marian Snow Mountain" are still sung today.

== Selected publications ==
- J. G. Seidenbusch, Catholische Andachts-Ubung ("Catholic Devotional Exercise") (1676)
- J. G. Seidenbusch, Marianischer Schnee-Berg, oder Beschreibung der Andacht bey Unser Lieben Frawen zum Schnee auff dem Berg zu Auffhausen … Sambt Neun und zwantzig Bitt- und Lob-Gesänglein ("Marian Snow Mountain, or a Description of the Devotion at Our Lady of the Snows on the Mountain at Auffhausen ... together with nine and twenty Songs of Prayer and Praise") (1687)
- J. G. Seidenbusch, Deo Gratias, oder Höchst-schuldigste Dancksagung Gegen der Allerheiligisten Dreyfaltigkeit ("Deo Gratias, or Most Obedient Thanksgiving to the Most Holy Trinity") (1718)
