= Joseph Owades =

- Born: July 9, 1919; Manhattan, New York, U.S.
- Died: December 16, 2005 (aged 86); Sonoma, California, U.S.
- Resting place: Home of Peace Cemetery (Colma, California)
- Education: City College of New York
- Alma mater: New York University Tandon School of Engineering
- Known for: Brewer of light and industrially produced beer
- Awards: Award of Merit from the Master Brewers Association of the Americas
- Scientific career
- Fields: Biochemistry
- Institutions: Fleischmann's Yeast
- Thesis: Sterol Sulphates: A Study of αCholesterylene and Other Decomposition Products (1950)

Joseph Lawrence Owades (July 9, 1919 – December 16, 2005) was an American biochemist and brewer of light and industrially produced beer. He adjusted analytical techniques and quality control, was involved in the development of the first modern light beer, creating many new, unique, and successful specialty beers. He is regarded by some as the father of light beer.

== Early life ==
Owades was born in Manhattan, the son of Jewish parents, and raised in the Bronx. His father, Shmuel, was a dressmaker. In 1939 he graduated from City College of New York (undergraduate), followed by New York University Tandon School of Engineering (Master's and PhD in biochemistry, 1944, 1950), with a dissertation on cholesterol titled Sterol Sulphates: A Study of αCholesterylene and Other Decomposition Products. After wartime work for the US Navy, he went on to Fleischmann's Yeast, Schwarz Laboratories in Mount Vernon, New York (where he taught the Schwarz Brewing Course), and Rheingold Breweries in Brooklyn, where he became Vice President–Technical Director.

== Development of light beer ==
At Rheingold, Owades developed the recipe for Gablinger Beer, one of the first reduced calorie beers. Gablinger was brewed using a process invented by chemist Dr. Hersch Gablinger of Basel, Switzerland. Dr. Gablinger's process involved adding an enzyme (amyloglucosidase) to the wort during fermentation that converted nonfermentable starch into fermentable sugar. The use of this process eliminated carbohydrates from the finished beer, and allowed its caloric content to be reduced by about one-third, while also making it less filling. After Rheingold officials traveled to Europe and sampled Dr. Gablinger's beer, Rheingold bought the exclusive rights to use his process. Using Dr. Gablinger's process, Owades developed the recipe for Gablinger Beer, which was introduced by Rheingold in late 1966.

== Craft brewing consultation ==
Following his time at Rheingold, Owades went to work in Greece for the K. Fix Brewery, then moved to Anheuser-Busch in St. Louis, Missouri, followed by Carling Breweries in Boston. In 1975 Owades formed the Center for Brewing Studies in San Francisco, where he provided consulting services to many micro- and mid-sized brewers and taught annual seminars, becoming known as "the Godfather of the Brewing Industry".

Among his consulting clients were New Amsterdam Brewing in New York City; Anchor Brewing Company in San Francisco; Boston Beer Company, where he developed the highly successful Samuel Adams lager; New Century Brewing, for whom he created Edison light beer; the Olde Heurich Brewing Company; and Rheingold Brewing, where he re-created the original Rheingold lager.

== Later life and death ==
Owades held many patents in the field of brewing and elsewhere.

Owades received the 1994 Award of Merit from the Master Brewers Association of the Americas, and spoke before many brewing organizations. He was among those awarded the Sesquicentennial Medal as a distinguished alumnus by NYU Polytechnic University. He wrote the articles on beer and alcohol metabolism for the Encyclopedia of Food Science and Technology. He was named to the Board of the American Committee for the Weizmann Institute of Science in Israel, where in 1999 he endowed the Joseph and Ruth Owades Chair in Chemistry.

Owades died at his home in Sonoma, California on December 16, 2005. He is buried at Home of Peace Cemetery in Colma, California.
