= Aufhausen =

- Municipality
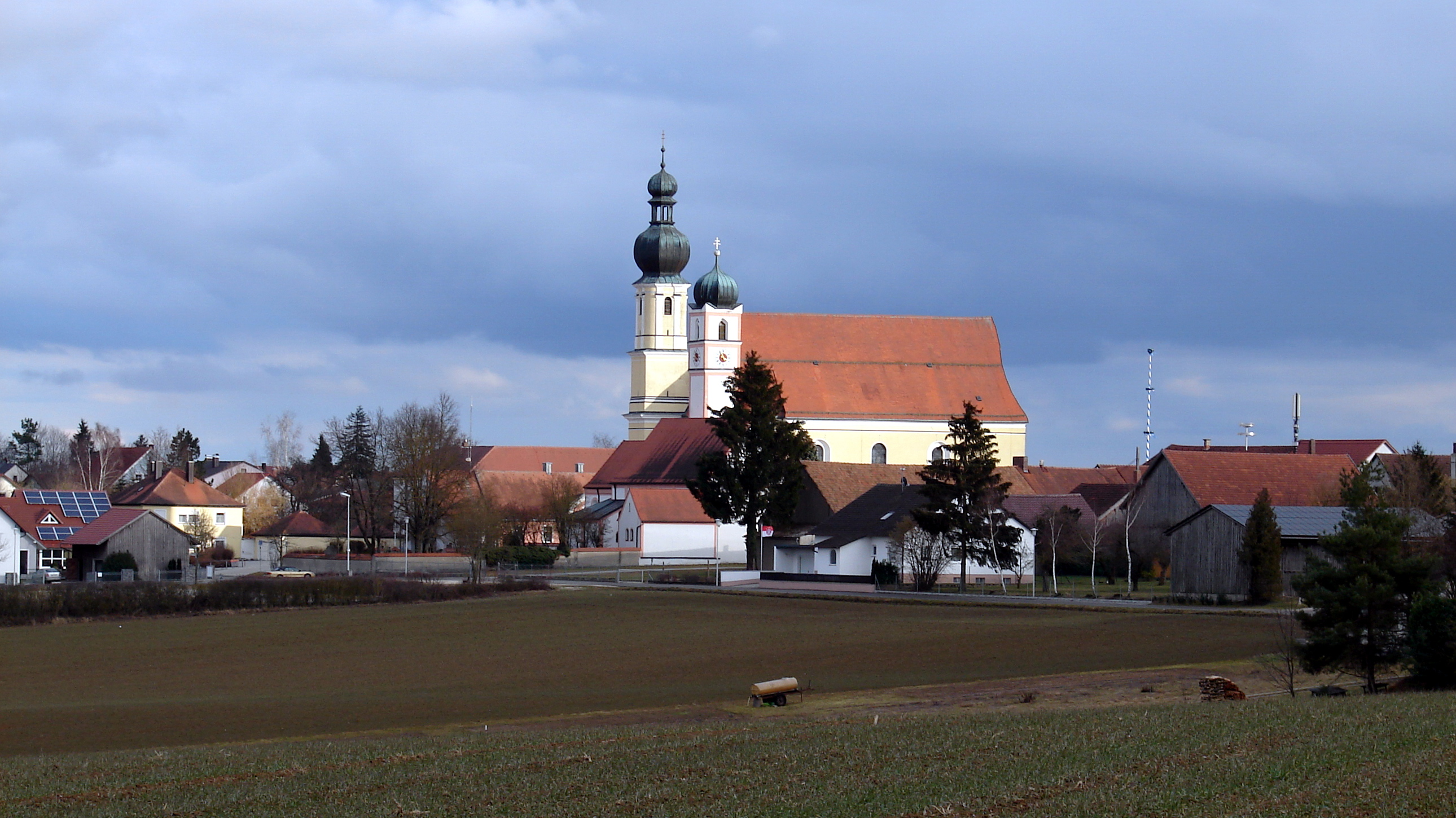
- Church of Our Lady of the Snows and of Saints Bartholomew and Dionysius

- Coat of arms

- Location of Aufhausen within Regensburg district
- Interactive map of Aufhausen
- Location within Germany Location within Bavaria
- Coordinates: 48°52′20″N 12°17′9″E
- Country: Germany
- State: Bavaria
- Admin. region: Upper Palatinate
- District: Regensburg
- Municipal assoc.: Sünching

Government
  - Mayor (2020–26): Toni Schmid

Area
  - Total: 27.32 km^{2} (10.55 sq mi)
- Elevation: 395 m (1,296 ft)

Population (2025-12-31)
  - Total: 1,957
  - Density: 71.63/km^{2} (185.5/sq mi)
- Time zone: UTC+01:00 (CET)
  - Summer (DST): UTC+02:00 (CEST)
- Postal codes: 93089
- Dialling codes: 09454
- Vehicle registration: R
- Website: www.gemeinde-aufhausen.de

Aufhausen is a municipality in the district of Regensburg in Bavaria in Germany.

Aufhausen Priory is located in the village.

== Notable people ==
- Johann Georg Seidenbusch (1641–1729), priest, painter, and composer, founder of Aufhausen Priory
- Samuel Liebmann (1799–1872), brewer in New York City
