= Rheingold Brewery =

American brewery (1883–1987)

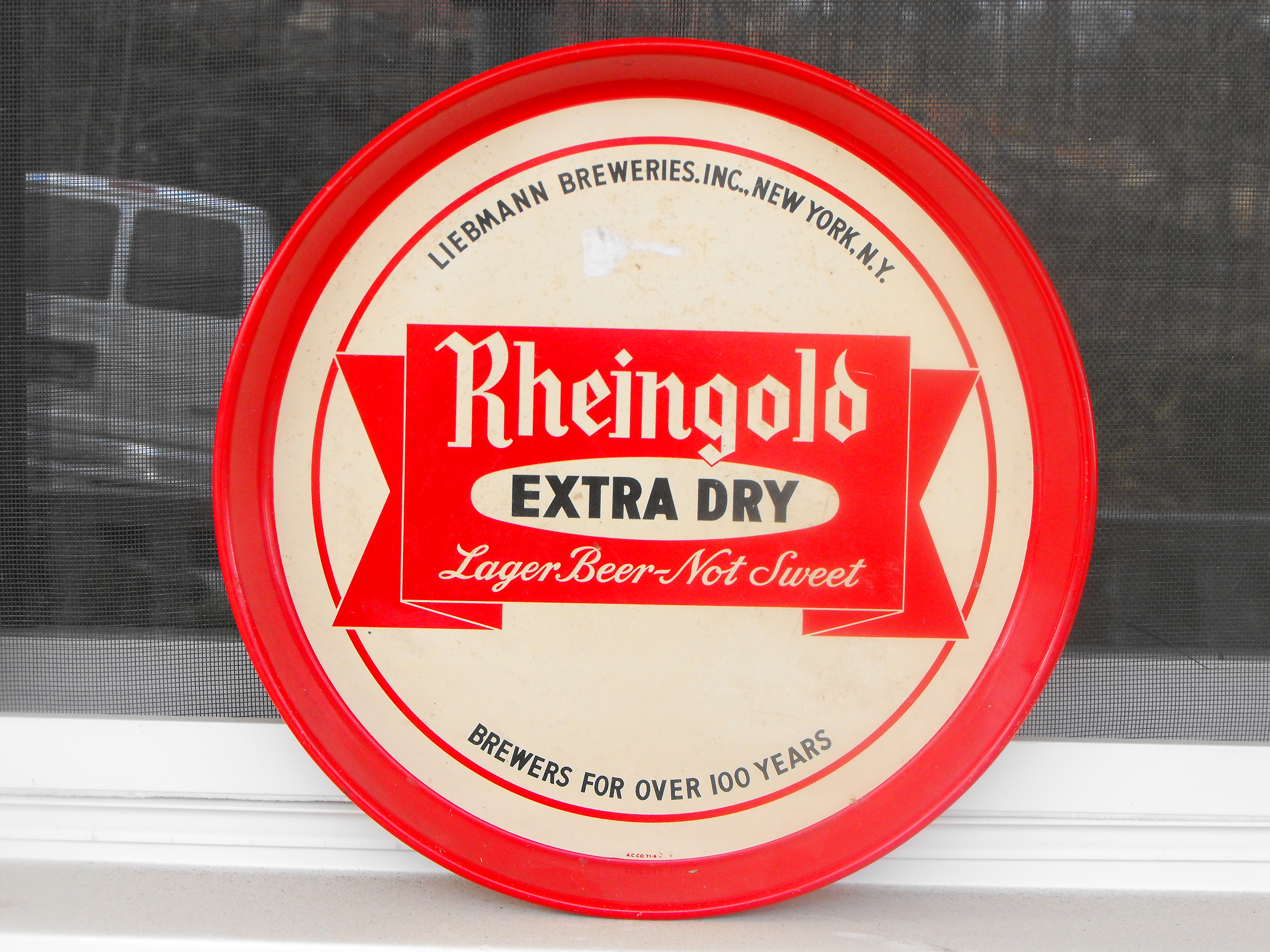
Antique Rheingold beer tray

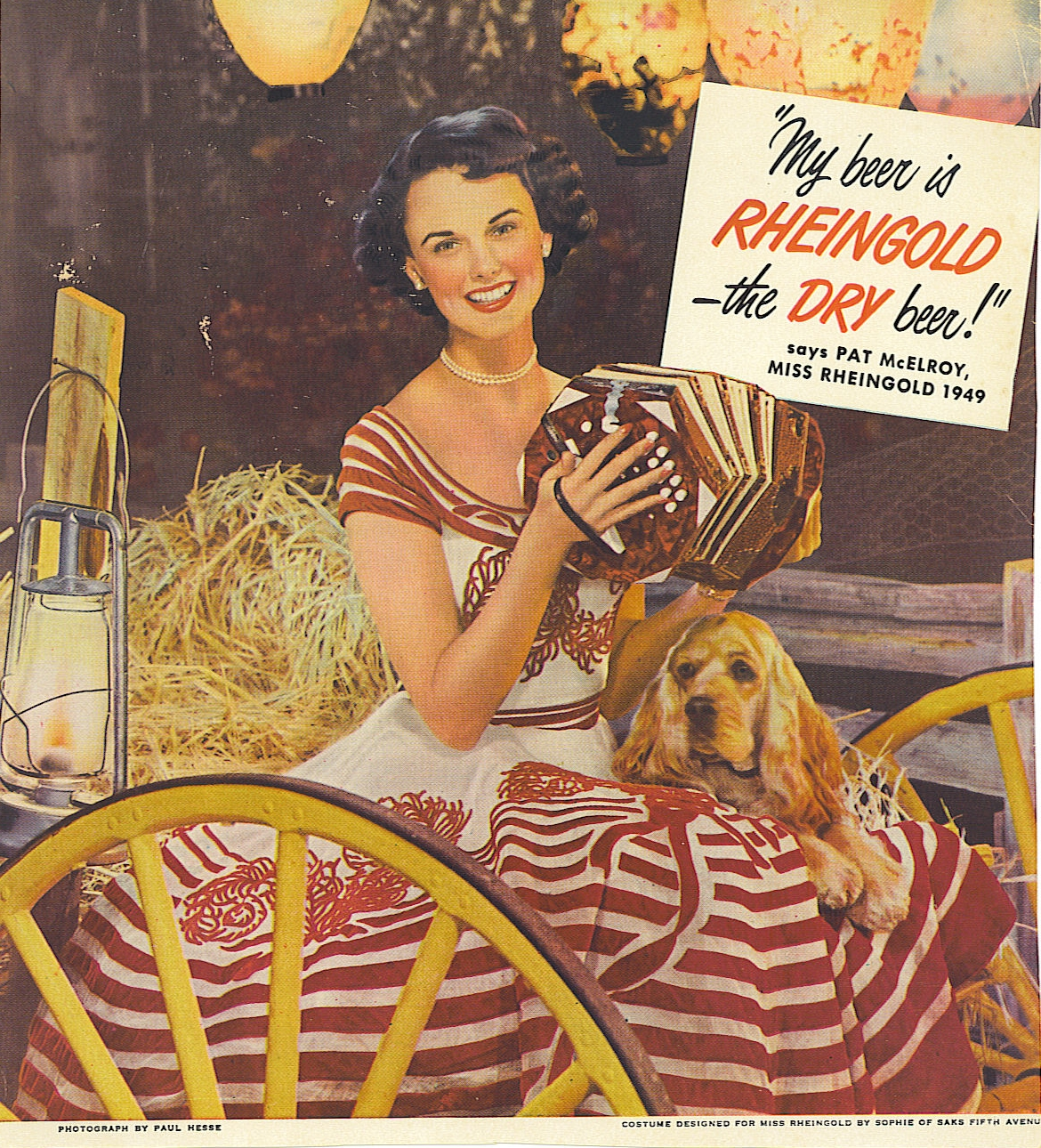
Miss Rheingold 1949

Rheingold Brewery, also referred to as Rheingold Breweries, or Liebmann Breweries, was the producer and marketer of Rheingold Beer from 1883 until 1987. This article is about both the brewery and its primary brand "Rheingold," which has been sold by other companies intermittently since Rheingold Brewery was ended.

Founded by Samuel Liebmann and his three sons as S. Liebmann Brewery, the brewing company was run by the Liebmann family, through several name changes, until 1964 when the fourth American generation sold it to New Jersey–based Pepsi-Cola United Bottlers. At its peak, the company owned five plants around the United States and Rheingold was the leading beer brand in New York State with a market share as high as 35% during the 1940s, 1950s, and early 1960s.

Rheingold Breweries was purchased by Chock full o'Nuts in 1974, and then by Christian Schmidt Brewing Company in 1977. Schmidt continued to sell Rheingold Beer under the subsidiary name, "Rheingold Brewery". In 1987, Rheingold was purchased by G. Heileman Brewing Company which continued to sell the beer but stopped using Rheingold Brewery or Breweries as a company name on the label. Sales of Rheingold Beer have been continued off-and-on by subsequent owners, with two gaps—one in the mid-1990s and another from 2013 through 2023.

The name Rheingold is an allusion to the legendary ring made of gold from the Rhein (Rhine) river in Germany, which is the subject of the opera Das Rheingold.

== History ==
In 1854, brewer Samuel Liebmann immigrated from Germany to America, partly to escape government oppression. He sent his oldest son Joseph ahead to find a suitable place for a brewery. When Samuel, his wife, and the other five children arrived in Philadelphia on November 7, 1854, Joseph met them on the wharf and escorted them to Brooklyn. Within a week, Samuel leased a small brewery on Meserole Street where he started brewing beer with his three sons. A year later the company bought a 6.4-acre site at the corner of Forrest Street and Bremen Street, in the Bushwick section of Brooklyn, and built a new plant there. Samuel retired in 1868, and in 1870 the name of the company was changed to S. Liebmann’s Sons Brewery.

The Rheingold brand name was first used in 1883. There are several family-lore explanations of its origin. The first is simply that "Rheingold" was an allusion to the great Rhein River in Germany (also spelled "Rhine"). Another story was that at a banquet held after an opera performance, the conductor held up the glass of beer and declared it was the color of "Rheingold", or "Das Rheingold" ("Rheingold" being a reference to the legendary ring, made of gold from the Rhine River, which is central to Richard Wagner's Ring cycle operas. Das Rheingold is the first of the four Ring cycle operas.) A third version holds that a special beer was brewed for a dinner held to honor the head of the Metropolitan Opera after the season finale performance of Das Rheingold, and the beer was named "Rheingold". It was a hit, so the brewery introduced it as a permanent product.

The brewery's production increased from 1,200 barrels in its first year, to 39,000 barrels in 1877, 165,000 barrels in 1894, 200,000 barrels per year in the early 1900s and 700,000 US beer barrels (820,000 hl) in 1914. It expanded to adjacent properties, absorbed the nearby John Schoenwald Brewery in 1878, and Claus-Lipsius Brewery in 1902, and in 1907 it was the largest and most complete brewing facility in the eastern United States, occupying 18-acres and four city blocks. The plant pioneered new refrigeration methods and was the first plant to have its own laboratory.

During Prohibition, from 1920 through 1933, the brewery survived by selling "near beer", lemonade, and "Teutonic", a concentrated liquid extract of malt and hops for nutrition and good health.

During the three decades following Prohibition, Rheingold was promoted as the "Dry Beer", and the annual Miss Rheingold contest, launched in 1940, became the centerpiece of its marketing campaign. Between 1947 and 1954, the company acquired four new plants: In 1947, Eichler Brewery in the Bronx; in 1950, Trommer's Brewery in Orange, New Jersey; and in 1954, the San Francisco and Los Angeles plants of Acme Brewing Company. With five plants, Rheingold had more production facilities than any other brewing company in the country except Falstaff Brewing Corporation, which had six. Its expansion into California was unsuccessful; the San Francisco plant was closed in 1955, and the Los Angeles facility was sold to Hamm's Brewery in 1957.

Rheingold became the leading beer in New York state and prospered until the early 1960s when profits were squeezed by rising labor and other costs, and fierce price competition from brands whose broader national footprints gave them competitive advantages.

In 1964, the fourth generation of the Jewish American Liebmann family sold the company to New Jersey based Pepsi-Cola United Bottlers, Inc. (“PUB”), a bottling and distribution company of Pepsi-Cola and other soft drink brands, for $26 million, which then adopted the name “Rheingold Breweries” for the combined entity. Beer sales peaked in the following year, 1965, at 4,236,000 US beer barrels (4,971,000 hl), but declined thereafter.

In 1966 Rheingold Breweries introduced Gablinger's Beer, one of the first reduced calorie beers, which was brewed using a process originated by chemist Dr. Hersch Gablinger of Basel, Switzerland. The beer was also marketed as Gablinger's Extra Light Beer. It failed in the marketplace, but the formula was tweaked by Joseph Owades, PhD, a biochemist working for Rheingold, and made available to Meister Brau Inc. in 1967, which made minor adjustments to Owades' formula and marketed it as Meister Brau Lite. Despite widespread popularity of Meister Brau and Meister Brau Lite, the brewery carried unmanageable debt and in 1972 sold both brands to Miller Brewing Company, which relaunched Lite as "Lite Beer from Miller", and later Miller Lite.

In 1967, Rheingold Breweries acquired Dawson Brewing Company in New Bedford, Massachusetts.

In February 1973, PepsiCo, Inc. bought a controlling interest in Rheingold Breweries, paying $57 million for 83% of the Rheingold/Pepsi Bottling operation. Industry observers said that PepsiCo was more interested in the company's soft drinks bottlers in California, Florida, Mexico, and Puerto Rico than in the beer business. Sales in 1973 fell below 3 million US bbl (3.5 million hl).

In January 1974, after difficult negotiations with the local Teamsters Union, Pepsi closed the Brooklyn plant, explaining that it was on track to lose $8 million due to high costs. The remaining two beer plants in Orange, New Jersey and New Bedford, Massachusetts remained open. Pepsi poured 100,000 US gallons (380,000 L) of beer into the East River, saying that packing it would be too costly. The plant was kept open for two months when the Teamsters Union filed an antitrust lawsuit asking for an injunction against Pepsi to prevent them from closing the plant, contesting the legality of Pepsi's right to control the plant, and claiming $600 million in treble damages for the workers of the two local union chapters. But the plant was officially closed in early March.

William Black, the founder of the Chock full o'Nuts coffee company stepped in and negotiated a deal with the union, giving their members ownership of 10% of Rheingold Brewery in exchange for wage concessions. He then purchased the brewery on March 8, 1974, for $1 plus assumption of the brewery's $10 million in debt.

The Brooklyn plant was unprofitable for another two years and its doors were closed for good in mid-January 1976. Rheingold production was continued in the brewery’s Orange, New Jersey plant.

In October 1977, Chock full o'Nuts sold Rheingold Breweries to Christian Schmidt Brewing Company of Philadelphia, which moved production of Rheingold Beer to its Philadelphia and Cleveland, Ohio, plants and sold the Orange, New Jersey, plant. Schmidt changed the callout on the Rheingold label from "Extra Dry" to "Premium", and changed the brewery of record on the label to "Rheingold Brewery".

Christian Schmidt's brands were sold to G. Heileman Brewing Company in April 1987, and then to Stroh Brewery Company in July 1996. Heileman Brewing continued to manufacture Rheingold Beer in its La Crosse, Wisconsin, plant, at least into the 1990s. No written record of this can be found, but vintage Rheingold Premium cans are occasionally seen on eBay that show "G. Heileman Brewing Co., LA CROSSE, WISCONSIN", on the side panel and with 1990s-style stay-tabs.

In 1996, Mike Mitaro, a veteran beer industry executive, licensed the rights to the Rheingold brand from Stroh, started Rheingold Brewing Company, Inc., and relaunched Rheingold Beer in 1998. The new Rheingold executive team included Walter "Terry" Liebmann, a fifth-generation American member of the family of brewers who had worked at Rheingold Breweries in the 1960s. The product was produced under contract by F.X. Matt Brewing Company in Utica, New York, and, starting in 2004, at Greenpoint Beer Works in Clinton Hill, Brooklyn.

In February 1999, Stroh sold the Rheingold brand to Pabst Brewing Company.

In 2005, Drinks Americas of Wilton, Connecticut, purchased Rheingold Brewing Company, Inc. The product was modified and F.X. Matt Brewing Company continued to produce it under contract. As of 2010, Drinks America was selling Rheingold Beer in the New York Metropolitan Area, Connecticut, New Jersey, Pennsylvania, and Maryland. By 2011, it had expanded to Cincinnati, Ohio, Georgia, and Florida. Drinks America stopped selling Rheingold in 2013 and it was unavailable until mid-2023 when Brewing Brands, LLC sold some.

The Rheingold Brewery building in Brooklyn was torn down in 1981. In 2018, after many years of disrepair and vacancy, a 500-unit apartment building was built on the site. The apartment complex, at 10 Monteith Street, Brooklyn, is called, “The Rheingold” or “Rheingold - Bushwick”.

== Additional products and brands ==
While Rheingold Beer was its main product, the brewery also produced and sold additional products including Rheingold Ale, Rheingold Bock and Golden Bock, McSorley's Cream Ale, Knickerbocker Beer, Knickerbocker Natural, Kool Mule, Esslinger's, Acme Gold Label Beer, and Bull Dog Ale. Also, during the time when the company was combined with Pepsi United Bottling in New Jersey, Rheingold Breweries became a local producer and distributor of Pepsi, and other soft drinks.

== Marketing ==
Rheingold developed a successful marketing formula in the early 1940s that led to thirty years of share strength. It included radio and television jingles, the annual "Miss Rheingold" contest, official sponsorship of the New York Mets, and print and TV advertising with racial diversity that was atypical at the time.

Rheingold was the official beer of the New York Mets, and its advertisements featured John Wayne, Jackie Robinson, Sarah Vaughan and the Marx Brothers. Humorist and radio personality Jean Shepherd was the radio spokesman for Rheingold's radio ads on New York Mets broadcasts in the 1970s. Famous cartoon animator Jay Ward (Rocky and Bullwinkle) produced several animated commercials for Rheingold, featuring an inept theatrical troupe' titled "The Rheingold Extra Dry, Extra Talented Players".

Rheingold's radio and TV commercials typically featured jingles that became widely known. One was written by jazz musician Les Paul in 1951. Another was set to Émile Waldteufel's, Estudiantina Waltz, Op. 191, with the words:

My beer is Rheingold, the dry beer.

Think of Rheingold whenever you buy beer.

It's not bitter, not sweet; it's the dry flavored treat.

Won't you try extra dry Rheingold beer?

When Nat King Cole became the first major black entertainer to host a television show, many advertisers demurred; Rheingold on the other hand became the New York regional sponsor for Cole's show. Rheingold aired television ads featuring African American, Puerto Rican, and Asian American actors to appeal to its racially diverse customer base. Rheingold also sponsored The Jackie Robinson Show on Sunday evenings during the late 1950s and early 1960s.

Rheingold's core consumer was working class men. A 2003 New York Times article gave a creative description: "Rheingold Beer was once a top New York brew, guzzled regularly by a loyal cadre of workingmen, who would just as soon have eaten nails as drink another beer maker's suds." During the cleanup of the World Trade Center rubble after the 2001 collapse, Rheingold cans were found that had been stashed in the beams by construction workers decades earlier.

In 2004, Rheingold stirred controversy in New York City with a series of ads that mocked New York City Mayor Michael Bloomberg's ban on smoking in bars and enforcement of city laws prohibiting dancing in bars that did not have a "cabaret license". Bloomberg responded by drinking Coors in public.

== Miss Rheingold (1940–1965, and 2003-2004) ==
In 1940, Philip Liebmann, great-grandson of founder Samuel Liebmann, initiated the "Miss Rheingold" contest. The first winner was chosen by company executives, but subsequent winners were chosen by popular vote. Each year, six candidates were chosen from a large field of applicants by a panel of company leaders, celebrities, and advertising executives. Then Rheingold drinkers could vote for their favorite at up to 35,000 boxes displayed at the end of supermarket aisles, atop crates of Rheingold beer and on bar tops – always with pictures of the six finalists framing the box. The contest was heavily funded and the winner would be widely-publicized throughout the following year in TV and radio commercials, on billboards, and packaging, as "Miss Rheingold". In the 1950s, as many as 25 million votes were cast, leading the company to claim, "the selection of Miss Rheingold was almost as highly anticipated as the race for the White House."

The first Miss Rheingold was Spanish-born Jinx Falkenburg. Future NBC television personality Robbin Bain was crowned in 1959. Two of the final winners were actresses Emily Banks (1960) and Celeste Yarnall (1964), both of whom had featured guest roles as yeomen on separate episodes of Star Trek: The Original Series. A number of Miss Rheingold runner-ups achieved success in show business, including Jean Moorhead, Suzanne Alexander, and Robbin Bain.

The public contest was ended after 1964 because budgets were being squeezed, and the image of demure, smiling, all-white females was becoming passé. A winner was chosen in 1965 by brewery executives.

The new Rheingold owners revived the Miss Rheingold contest in 2003 and 2004, but unlike the wholesome girl-next-door image of earlier Miss Rheingold contestants, a company spokesman explained: "They no longer wore ball gowns and white gloves; They had tattoos. They were pierced. They were badasses." Though in 2003, The Village Voice noted Rheingold for "the best marketing campaign co-opting hipster drinking habits." Public response was lackluster compared with earlier years and the contest was not continued.

== In popular culture ==
=== In music ===
In the introduction to the Eartha Kitt song "I Wanna Be Evil", she sings, "I was made Miss Rheingold though I never touch beer".

The band 33 on the Needle from Alton, Illinois, released the song "Rheingold Girl" on their 2017 album Sounds Across the Midnight Sky.

In an episode of The Golden Girls, Sophia recalled that Rheingold was the favorite beer of her late husband, Salvatore. She, Dorothy, and Blanche then sang the Rheingold jingle. (Season 7, episode 24 "Home Again, Rose: Part 2")

=== In literature ===
In the Stephen King novel, Carrie, the rough greaser Billy Nolan (along with his friends) are mentioned to have drunk Rheingold beer instead of Budweiser which was popular with “frat boys”.
