= History of United Kingdom–United States relations =

An amalgamation of the American (left) and British (right) flags

The relationship between the United Kingdom and the United States has seen the former go from being the colonial ruler of the latter until the late 18th century, to becoming major partners during the World Wars. After the mid-20th century, a Special Relationship was struck up, with the United Kingdom also ceding its lead in world affairs to the United States.

== Post-Columbian era ==
=== Origins ===
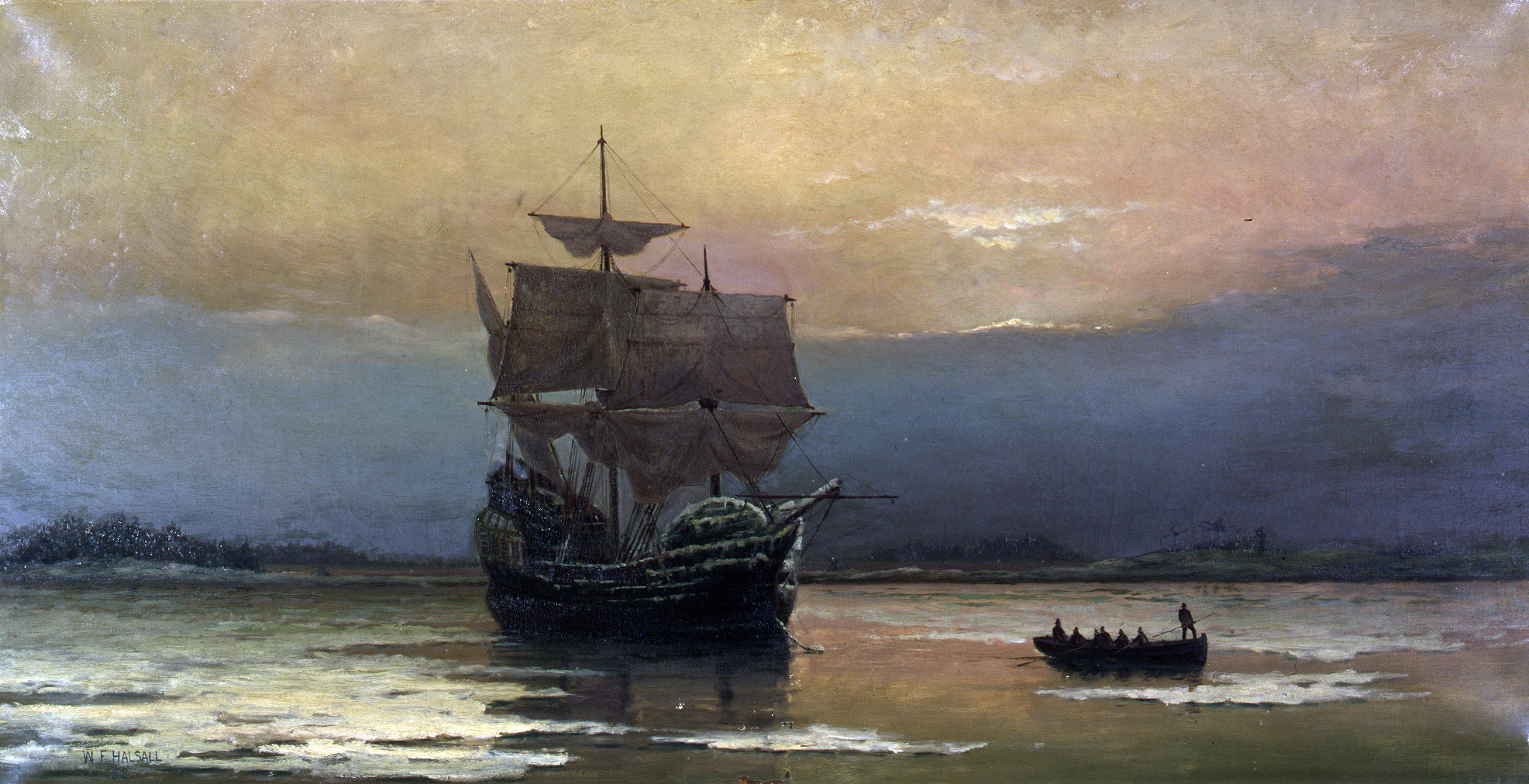
The Mayflower transported the Pilgrims to the New World in 1620, as depicted in William Halsall's The Mayflower in Plymouth Sound, 1882.

After several failed attempts, the first permanent English settlement in mainland North America was established in 1607 at Jamestown in the Virginia. In 1630 the Puritans established the Massachusetts Bay Colony; they emphasised not only pure religiosity, but also education and entrepreneurship.

Smaller colonies followed in Province of Maine (1622), Province of Maryland (1632), Colony of Rhode Island and Providence Plantations (1636) and Connecticut Colony (1636). Later came the founding of Province of Carolina (1663) (divided in 1729 into the Province of North Carolina and the Province of South Carolina). The Province of New Hampshire was founded in 1691. Finally came the Province of Georgia in 1732 founded by James Oglethorpe. The British created the Province of New York from the conquered Dutch colony of New Netherland. In 1674, the Province of New Jersey was split off from New York. In 1681 William Penn founded the Quaker colony Province of Pennsylvania. Each colony reported separately to London.

=== Migration ===
All the colonies had slavery. Most of the slaves were purchased from British colonies in the Caribbean. The colonies attracted British and German immigrants seeking to own a farm. During the 17th century, about 350,000 English and Welsh migrants arrived. After 1700 came even larger numbers of Scots and Scots-Irish migrants.

During British colonization, liberal administrative, juridical, and market institutions were introduced, positively associated with socioeconomic development. At the same time, colonial policy was also quasi-mercantilist, encouraging trade within the Empire, discouraging trade with other powers, and discouraging the rise of manufacturing in the colonies, which had been established to increase the trade and wealth of the mother country. Britain made much greater profits from the sugar trade of its commercial colonies in the Caribbean.

The colonial period also saw the introduction of indentured servitude and slavery. All of the Thirteen Colonies were involved in the slave trade. Slaves in the Middle Colonies and New England Colonies typically worked as house servants, artisans, laborers and craftsmen. Early on, slaves in the Southern Colonies worked primarily in agriculture, on farms and plantations growing indigo, rice, cotton, and tobacco for export.

The French and Indian War, fought between 1754 and 1763, was the North American theatre of the Seven Years' War. The conflict, the fourth such colonial war between France and Britain in North America, resulted in the British acquisition of New France from the French. Under the Treaty of Paris signed in 1763, the French ceded control of French Louisiana east of the Mississippi River to the British, which became known as the Indian Reserve in the Royal Proclamation of 1763.

Data from the US Census in 2000
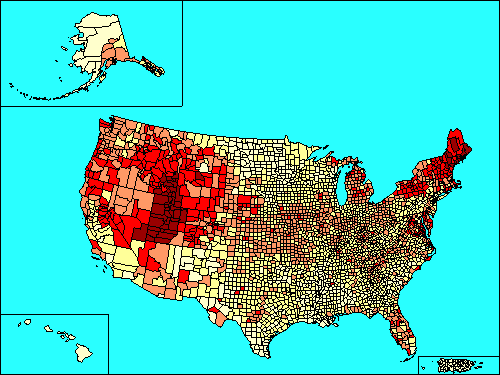
Proportions of English ancestry

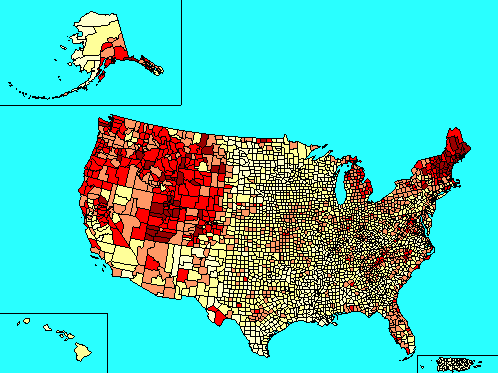
Proportions of Scots ancestry

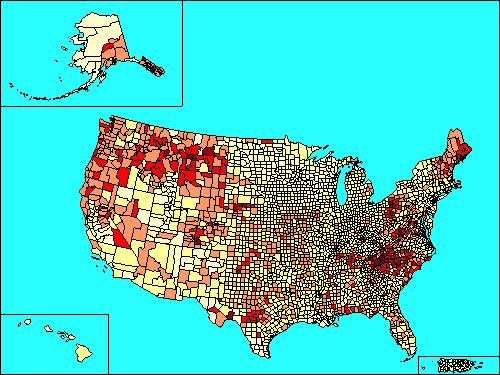
Proportions of Scots-Irish ancestry

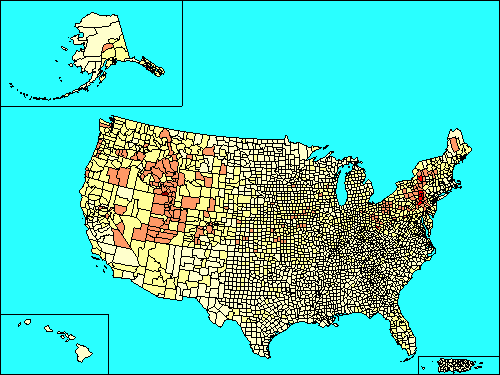
Proportions of Welsh ancestry

=== Religion ===
The religious ties between the homeland and the colonies were pronounced. Most of the churches were transplants from Europe. The Puritans of New England seldom kept in touch with nonconformists in England. Much closer were the transatlantic relationships maintained by the Quakers, especially in Pennsylvania. The Methodists also maintained close ties.

The Anglican Church was officially established in the Southern colonies, which meant that local taxes paid the salary of the minister, the parish had civic responsibilities such as poor relief, and the local gentry controlled the parish. The church was disestablished during the American Revolution. The Anglican churches in America were under the authority of the Bishop of London, and there was a long debate over whether to establish an Anglican bishop in America. The other Protestants blocked any such appointment. After the Revolution the newly formed Episcopal Church selected its own bishop and kept its distance from London.

== Post-American Revolution ==
=== American Revolution ===
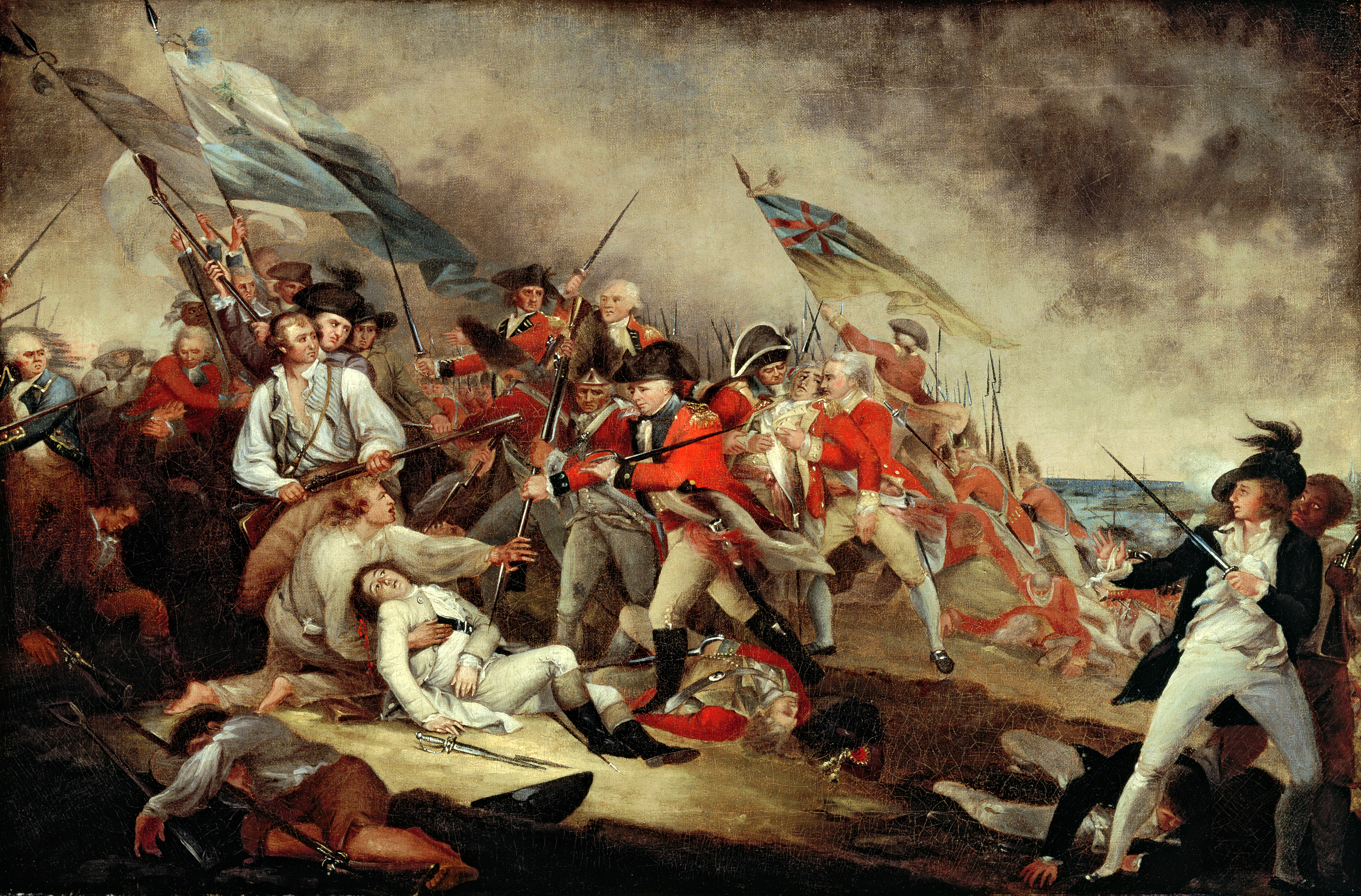
John Trumbull's portrait depicting The Death of General Warren at the Battle of Bunker Hill in 1775

The Thirteen Colonies gradually obtained more self-government. British mercantilist policies became more stringent, benefiting the mother country which resulted in trade restrictions, thereby limiting the growth of the colonial economy and artificially constraining colonial merchants' earning potential. The sums were small but Parliament insisted that it was in final command and could impose taxes at any time. Tensions escalated from 1765 to 1775 over issues of taxation without any American representation in Parliament. Parliament imposed a series of taxes especially the Stamp Act of 1765, and the Tea Act 1773, against which an angry mob of colonists protested in the Boston Tea Party by dumping chests of tea into Boston Harbor.

Parliament punished Massachusetts with the Intolerable Acts in 1774, which were designed to strip away self-government. The other twelve colonies stood together with Massachusetts. They sent militia to Boston and expelled nearly all the royal officials in all 13 colonies by 1775. The Battles of Lexington and Concord in 1775 began the American War of Independence. While the goal of attaining independence was sought by a powerful majority known as Patriots, a weaker minority known as the Loyalists remained loyal to the king.

Congress unanimously declared independence in July 1776. The British managed to control New York City and parts of the South, but 90 per cent of the American population was controlled by Patriots. The entry of the French and Spanish decisively hurt British efforts. After two invasion armies were captured in 1777 and 1781, King George III lost control of Parliament and independence was negotiated on terms favorable to expanded bilateral trade. The United States of America became the first colony in the world to successfully achieve independence in the modern era. According to R. R. Palmer the new American nation:

inspired the sense of a new era. It added a new content to the concept of progress. It gave a whole new dimension to ideas of liberty and equality made familiar in the Enlightenment. It got people into the habit of thinking more concretely about political questions, and made them more readily critical of their own governments and society. It dethroned England and set up America as a model for those seeking a better world.

=== Peace treaty ===
The Treaty of Paris ended the war in 1783 on terms quite favourable to the new nation. The Americans realised they could get a better deal directly from London, ignoring their French ally. The British Prime Minister Lord Shelburne now saw a chance to split the United States away from France and make the new country a valuable economic partner.

The United States would gain all of the area east of the Mississippi River, north of Florida, and south of Canada. The northern boundary would be almost the same as today. The United States would gain fishing rights off the Atlantic coast of Canada, and agreed to allow British merchants and Loyalists to try to recover their property. It was a highly favourable treaty for the United States, and deliberately so from the British point of view. Shelburne foresaw a highly profitable two-way trade between Britain and the rapidly growing United States, which indeed came to pass.

=== End of the Revolution ===
The treaty was finally ratified in 1784. The British evacuated their soldiers and civilians in New York City, Charleston and Savannah in late 1783. Over 80 percent of the half-million Loyalists remained in the United States and became American citizens. The others mostly went to Canada, and referred to themselves as the United Empire Loyalists. Merchants and men of affairs often went to Britain to reestablish their business connections. Rich southern Loyalists, taking their slaves with them, typically headed to plantations in the West Indies. The British also evacuated about 3,000 Black Loyalists, former slaves who had escaped from their American masters and joined the British; they went to Nova Scotia. Many found it inhospitable and went to Sierra Leone, a newly established British colony in Africa.

The new nation gained control of nearly all the land east of the Mississippi and south of the St. Lawrence River and the Great Lakes. The British colonies of East and West Florida were given to Spain as its reward. The Native American tribes allied with Britain struggled in the aftermath; the British ignored them at the Peace conference, and most came under American control unless they moved to Canada or to Spanish territory. The British kept forts in the Northwest Territory (what is today the American Midwest, especially in Michigan and Wisconsin), where they supplied weapons to Indian tribes.

=== 1783–1807: Role of Jay Treaty ===
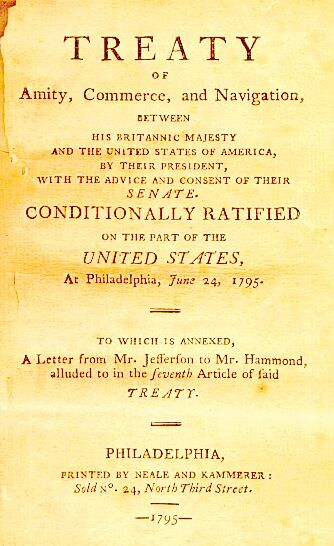
Privately printed pamphlet containing the text of the Jay Treaty

Trade resumed between the two nations when the war ended. The British allowed all exports to America but forbade some American food exports to its colonies in the West Indies. British exports reached £3.7 million, compared with imports of only £750,000. The imbalance caused a shortage of gold in the US.

In 1785, John Adams became the first American plenipotentiary minister, to the Court of St James's. King George III received him graciously. In 1791, Great Britain sent its first diplomatic envoy, George Hammond, to the United States.

When Great Britain and France went to war in 1793, relations between the United States and Great Britain also verged on war. Tensions were resolved when the Jay Treaty was approved in 1795. It established a decade of peace and prosperous trade relations. The historian Marshall Smelser argues that the treaty effectively postponed war with Britain, or at least postponed it until the United States was strong enough to handle it. The Americans had a list of outstanding issues regarding British control of border areas and British support of Indian tribes hostile to the United States, as well as British efforts to stop trade with France. The final treaty settled most of the issues.

The Federalist Party led by Alexander Hamilton was pro-British and it worked hard to ratify the Jay treaty. The new Republican Party was vehemently opposed. Led by Thomas Jefferson and James Madison, the Republicans strongly favored Revolutionary France and deeply distrusted reactionary Britain as a threat to American values of republicanism. President George Washington made the decisive intervention so the Treaty was ratified by exactly a 2/3 vote, and the necessary money was appropriated. The result was two decades of peace in a time of world war. The peace lasted until the Republicans came to power and Jefferson rejected a new treaty and began an economic attack on Britain.

Bradford Perkins argues that the treaty was the first to establish a special relationship between Britain and the United States, with a second installment under Lord Salisbury. In his view, the treaty worked for ten years to secure peace between Britain and America: "The decade may be characterised as the period of "The First Rapprochement." As Perkins concludes,

"For about ten years there was peace on the frontier, joint recognition of the value of commercial intercourse, and even, by comparison with both preceding and succeeding epochs, a muting of strife over ship seizures and impressment. Two controversies with France… pushed the English-speaking powers even more closely together."

Starting at swords' point in 1794, the Jay treaty reversed the tensions, Perkins concludes: "Through a decade of world war and peace, successive governments on both sides of the Atlantic were able to bring about and preserve a cordiality which often approached genuine friendship." Historian Joseph Ellis finds the terms of the treaty "one-sided in Britain's favor", but asserts a consensus of historians agrees that it was

"a shrewd bargain for the United States. It bet, in effect, on England rather than France as the hegemonic European power of the future, which proved prophetic. It recognised the massive dependence of the American economy on trade with England. In a sense it was a precocious preview of the Monroe Doctrine (1823), for it linked American security and economic development to the British fleet, which provided a protective shield of incalculable value throughout the nineteenth century. Mostly, it postponed war with England until America was economically and politically more capable of fighting one."

The US proclaimed its neutrality in the wars between Britain and France (1793–1815), and profited greatly by selling food, timber and other supplies to both sides.

Jefferson as president moved slowly to undermine the Jay Treaty and block its renewal. Amity collapsed in 1805, as a prelude to the War of 1812.

The transatlantic slave trade was largely suppressed after Great Britain passed the Abolition of the Slave Trade Act in 1807. At the urging of President Jefferson, the United States passed the Act Prohibiting Importation of Slaves in 1807, to take effect January 1, 1808.

=== War of 1812 ===
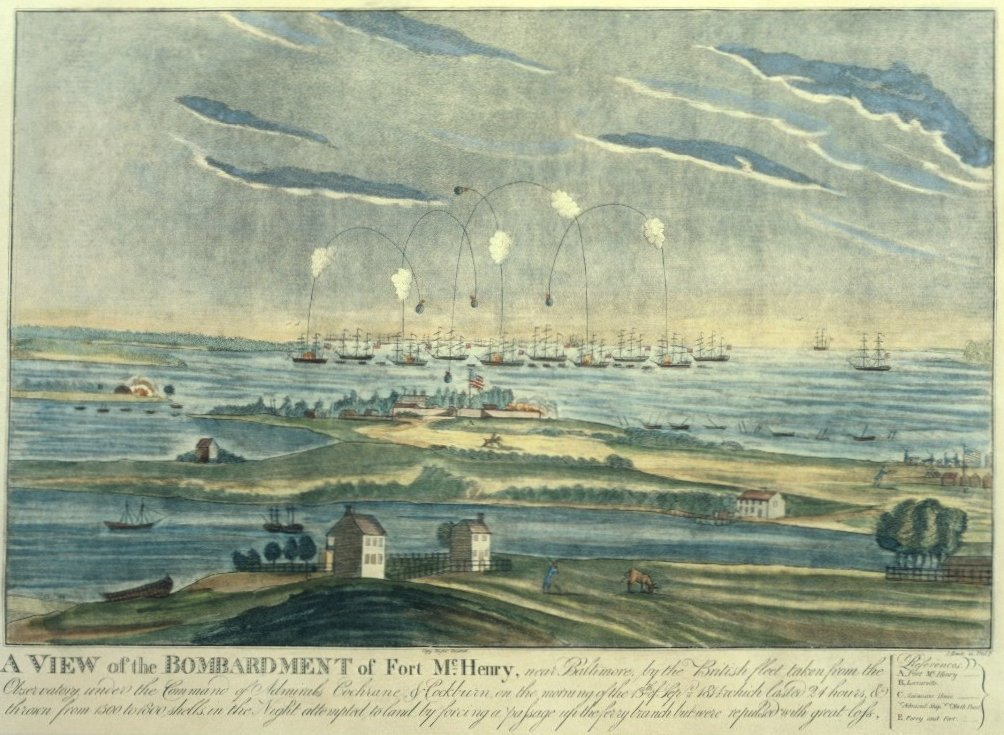
An artist's rendering of the bombardment at the Battle of Baltimore in 1814, which inspired Francis Scott Key to write the lyrics to "The Star-Spangled Banner", the national anthem of the United States

The United States imposed a trade embargo, namely the Embargo Act of 1807, in retaliation for Britain's blockade of France, which involved the visit and search of neutral merchantmen, and resulted in the suppression of Franco-United States trade for the duration of the Napoleonic Wars. The Royal Navy also boarded American ships and impressed sailors suspected of being British deserters. Expansion into the Midwest (i.e. Ohio to Wisconsin) was hindered by Native American tribes given munitions and support by British agents. Indeed, Britain's goal was the creation of an independent Indian state to block expansion westward by the US.

After diplomacy and the boycott had failed, the issue of national honour and independence came to the fore. Brands says, "The other war hawks spoke of the struggle with Britain as a second war of independence; [Andrew] Jackson, who still bore scars from the first war of independence held that view with special conviction. The approaching conflict was about violations of American rights, but it was also vindication of American identity."

Finally in June 1812 President James Madison called for war, and overcame the opposition of business interests in the Northeast. The US strategy called for a war against British shipping and especially cutting off food shipments to the British sugar plantations in the West Indies. Conquest of the northern colonies that later became Canada was a tactic designed to give the US a strong bargaining position. The main British goal was to defeat France, so until that happened in 1814 the war was primarily defensive. To enlist allies among Native Americans, led by Tecumseh, the British promised an independent Native American state would be created in territory claimed by the United States. British and Canadian forces repeatedly repulsed invasions by US forces, which were inadequately prepared, poorly led, and undermined by the unavailability of militia units, whose commanders refused to place them temporarily under federal control. Nevertheless, US forces took control of Lake Erie in 1813, and destroyed the offensive abilities of Native American forces, allied to the British, in the Northwest and South. The British invasion of the Chesapeake Bay in 1814 culminated in the "Burning of Washington", but the subsequent British attack on Baltimore was repelled. A British incursion into New York during 1814 was defeated at the Battle of Plattsburgh, and the invasion of Louisiana that launched before word of a ceasefire had reached General Andrew Jackson was decisively defeated at the Battle of New Orleans in 1815. Negotiations began in 1814 and produced the Treaty of Ghent, which restored the status quo ante bellum: there were no territorial gains by either side, and the British strategy of creating an independent Native American state was abandoned after strong American pressure. The United Kingdom retained the theoretical right of impressment, but stopped impressing any sailors, while the United States dropped the issue for good. The US celebrated the outcome as a victorious "second war of independence". The British, having finally defeated Napoleon at the Battle of Waterloo, celebrated that triumph and largely forgot their second war with the US. Tensions between the US and Canada were resolved through diplomacy. The War of 1812 marked the end of a long period of conflict (1775–1815) and ushered in a new era of peace between the two nations.

=== Disputes 1815–60 ===
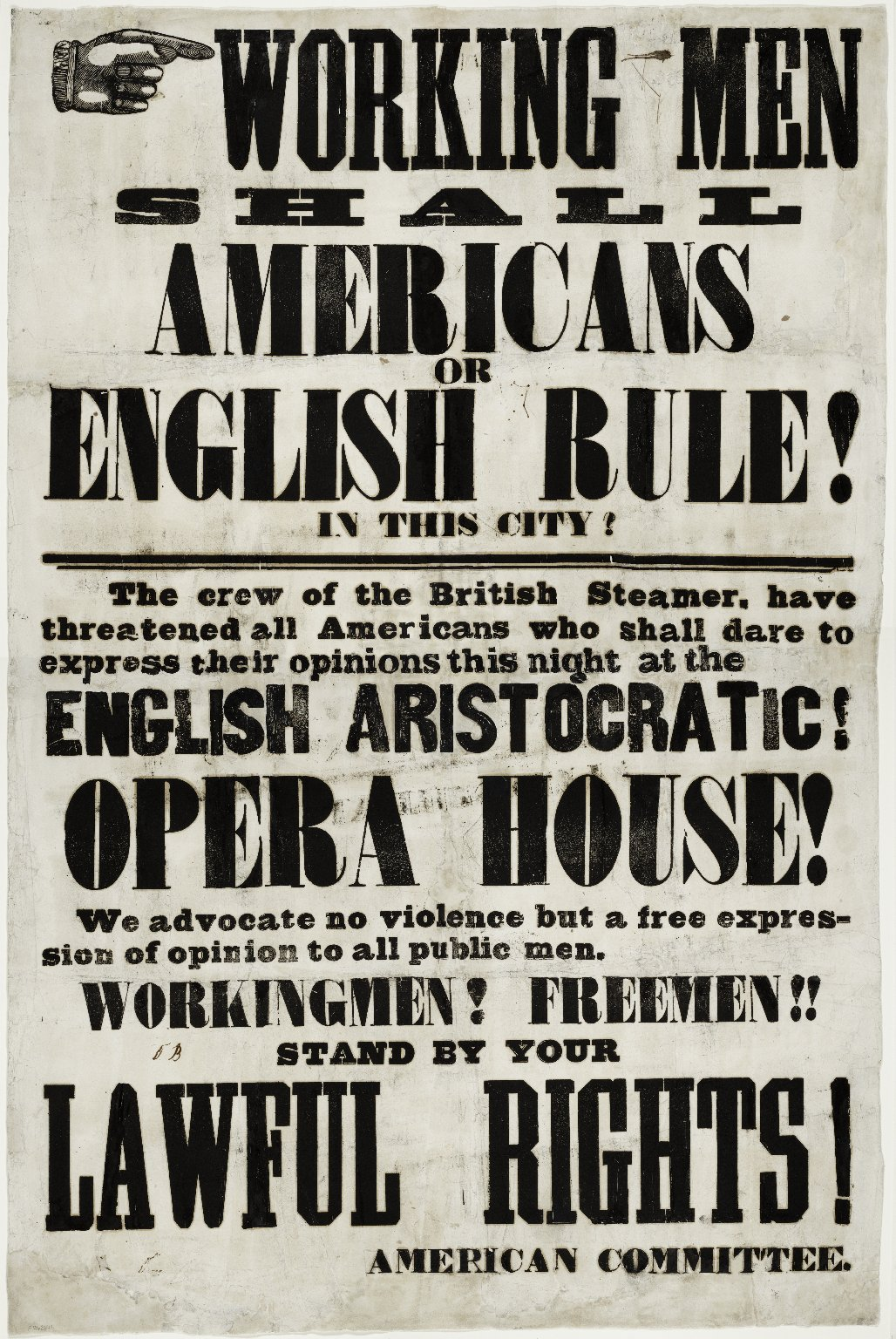
A strongly worded anti-British handbill handed out in New York City, which was prior to and complicit in instigating the 1849 Astor Place riot

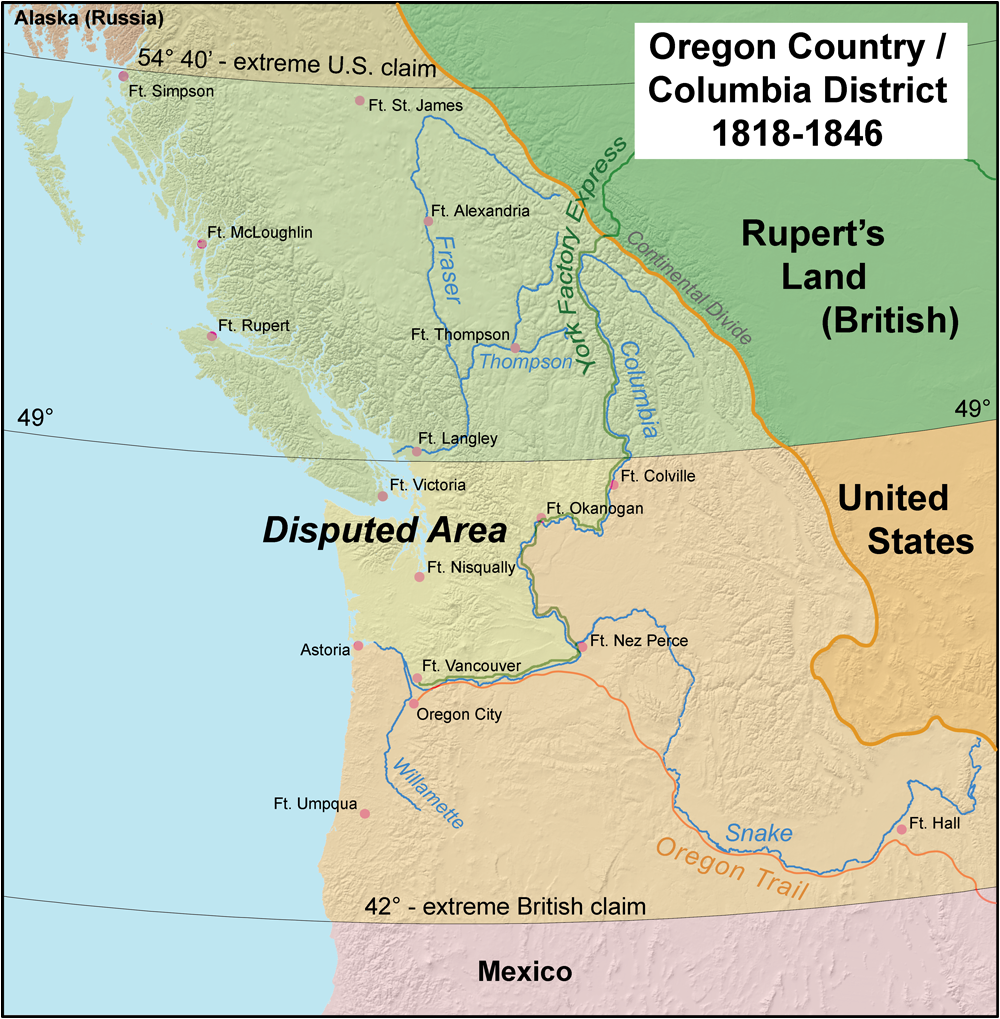
The Oregon Country/Columbia District stretched from 42N to 54 40'N; the most heavily disputed portion is highlighted.

In 1817 Rush–Bagot Treaty between the United States and Great Britain limited naval armaments on the Great Lakes and Lake Champlain.

The Monroe Doctrine, a unilateral response in 1823 to a British suggestion of a joint declaration, expressed American hostility to further European encroachment in the Western hemisphere. Nevertheless, the United States benefited from the common outlook in British policy and its enforcement by the Royal Navy. In the 1840s several states defaulted on bonds owned by British investors. London bankers avoided state bonds afterwards, but invested heavily in American railroad bonds.

In several episodes the American general Winfield Scott proved a sagacious diplomat by tamping down emotions and reaching acceptable compromises. Scott handled the Caroline affair in 1837. Rebels from British North America (now Ontario) fled to New York and used a small American ship called the Caroline to smuggle supplies into Canada after their rebellion was suppressed. In late 1837, Canadian militia crossed the border into the US and burned the ship, leading to diplomatic protests, a flare-up of Anglophobia, and other incidents.

Tensions on the vague Maine–New Brunswick boundary involved rival teams of lumberjacks in the bloodless Aroostook War of 1839. There was no shooting but both sides tried to uphold national honor and gain a few more miles of timber land. Each side had an old secret map that apparently showed the other side had the better legal case, so compromise was easily reached in the Webster–Ashburton Treaty of 1842, which settled the border in Maine and Minnesota. In 1859, the bloodless Pig War determined the position of the border in relation to the San Juan Islands and Gulf Islands.

British leaders were constantly annoyed from the 1840s to the 1860s by what they saw as Washington's pandering to the democratic mob, as in the Oregon boundary dispute in 1844–46. However, British middle-class public opinion sensed a "special relationship" between the two peoples based on language, migration, evangelical Protestantism, liberal traditions, and extensive trade. This constituency rejected war, forcing London to appease the Americans. During the Trent affair of late 1861, London drew the line and Washington retreated.

In 1844–48 the two nations had overlapping claims to Oregon. The area was largely unsettled, making it easy to end the crisis in 1848 by a compromise that split the region evenly, with British Columbia to Great Britain, and Washington, Idaho, and Oregon to America. The US then turned its attention to Mexico, which threatened war over the annexation of Texas. Britain tried without success to moderate the Mexicans, but when the war began it remained neutral. The US gained California, in which the British had shown only passing interest.

=== Nicaraguan canal ===
The discovery of gold in California in 1848 brought a heavy demand for passage to the gold fields, with the main routes crossing disease-ridden Panama to avoid a very long slow sailing voyage around all of South America. A railroad was built that carried 600,000 passengers but the disease threat remained. A canal in Nicaragua was a much more healthy and attractive possibility, and American businessmen gained the necessary permissions, along with a US treaty with Nicaragua. However the British were determined to block an American canal, and seized key locations on the Mosquito Coast on the Atlantic that blocked it. The Whig Party was in charge in Washington and were unlike the bellicose Democrats who wanted a businesslike, peaceful solution. The United States decided that a canal should be open and neutral to all the world's traffic, and not be militarized. Tensions escalated locally, with small-scale physical confrontations in the field. Washington and London found a diplomatic solution. The Clayton–Bulwer Treaty of 1850 guaranteed equal canal rights to both the US and Britain. Each agreed not to colonize Central America. However, no Nicaragua canal was ever started.

By the late 1890s Britain saw the need for much improved relations with the United States, and agreed to allow the US to build a canal through either Nicaragua or Panama. The choice was Panama. The Hay–Pauncefote Treaty of 1901 replaced the Clayton–Bulwer Treaty, and adopted the rule of neutralization for the Panama Canal which the US built; it opened in 1914.

== Post-American Civil War ==
=== American Civil War ===
In the American Civil War a major Confederate goal was to win recognition from Britain and France, which it expected would lead them to war with the US and enable the Confederacy to win independence. Because of astute American diplomacy, no nation ever recognised the Confederacy and war with Britain was averted. Nevertheless, there was considerable British sentiment in favour of weakening the US by helping the South win. At the beginning of the war Britain issued a proclamation of neutrality. The Confederate States of America had assumed all along that Britain would surely enter the war to protect its vital supply of cotton. This "King Cotton" argument was one reason the Confederates felt confident in the first place about going to war, but the Southerners had never consulted the Europeans and were tardy in sending diplomats. Even before the fighting began in April 1861 Confederate citizens (acting without government authority) cut off cotton shipments in an effort to exert cotton diplomacy. It failed because Britain had warehouses filled with cotton, whose value was soaring; not until 1862 did shortages become acute.

The Trent Affair in late 1861 nearly caused a war. A warship of the US Navy stopped the British civilian vessel RMS Trent and took off two Confederate diplomats, James Murray Mason and John Slidell. Britain prepared for war and demanded their immediate release. President Lincoln released the diplomats and the episode ended quietly.

Britain realised that any recognition of an independent Confederacy would be treated as an act of war against the United States. The British economy was heavily reliant on trade with the United States, most notably cheap grain imports which in the event of war, would be cut off by the Americans. Indeed, the Americans would launch an all-out naval war against the entire British merchant fleet.

Despite outrage and intense American protests, London turned blind eye to its blockade runners smuggling in money and weapons to the Confederacy (which actually lengthened the war by two years and killed 400,000 additional Americans) and allowed the British-built CSS Alabama to leave port and become a commerce raider under the naval flag of the Confederacy. The war ended in 1865; arbitration partially settled the issue in 1871, with a payment of $15.5 million in gold only for the damages caused by British-built Confederate commerce raiders.

In January 1863 Lincoln issued the Emancipation Proclamation, which was strongly supported by liberal elements in Britain. The British government predicted that emancipation of the slaves in America would create a race war in the country, and that intervention might be required on humanitarian grounds. This prediction turned out to be unfounded, and the declining capabilities of the Confederacy—such as loss of major ports and rivers—made its likelihood of success smaller and smaller.

=== Late 19th century ===
==== Canada ====
Relations were chilly during the 1860s as Americans resented British and Canadian roles during the Civil War. Both sides worked to make sure tensions did not escalate toward war. After the war American authorities looked the other way as Irish Catholic "Fenians" plotted and even attempted a tiny invasion of Canada to create pressure for an independent Ireland. Irish American politicians, a growing power in the Democratic Party demanded more independence for Ireland and made anti-British rhetoric—called "twisting the lion's tail"—a staple of election campaign appeals to the Irish vote.

The arbitration of the Alabama Claims in 1872 provided a satisfactory reconciliation; The British paid the United States $15.5 million for the economic damage caused by Confederate Navy warships purchased from it. Canada could never be defended so the British decided to cut their losses and eliminate the risk of a conflict with the US. The first ministry of William Gladstone withdrew from all its historic military and political responsibilities in North America. It brought home its troops (keeping Halifax as an Atlantic naval base), and turned responsibility over to the locals. That made it wise in 1867 to unify the separate Canadian colonies into a self-governing confederation named the "Dominion of Canada".

==== Free trade ====
Britain persisted in its free trade policy even as its major rivals, the US and Germany, turned to high tariffs (as did Canada). American heavy industry grew faster than Britain, and by the 1890s was crowding British machinery and other products out of the world market. London, however, remained the world's financial center, even as much of its investment was directed toward American railways. The Americans remained far behind the British in international shipping and insurance.

The American economic "invasion" of the British home market demanded a response. British conservatives promoted what they called "tariff reform", which consisted of raising the tariff, especially from countries outside the British Empire. Liberals counterattacked by portraying tariff reform as unpatriotic. Tariffs were finally imposed in the 1930s. Without tariffs to protect them, British businessmen were obliged to lose their market or else rethink and modernise their operations. For example, the boot and shoe industry faced increasing imports of American footwear; Americans took over the market for shoe machinery. British companies realised they had to meet the competition so they re-examined their traditional methods of work, labour utilisation, and industrial relations, and to rethink how to market footwear in terms of the demand for fashion.

=== Venezuelan and Alaska border disputes ===
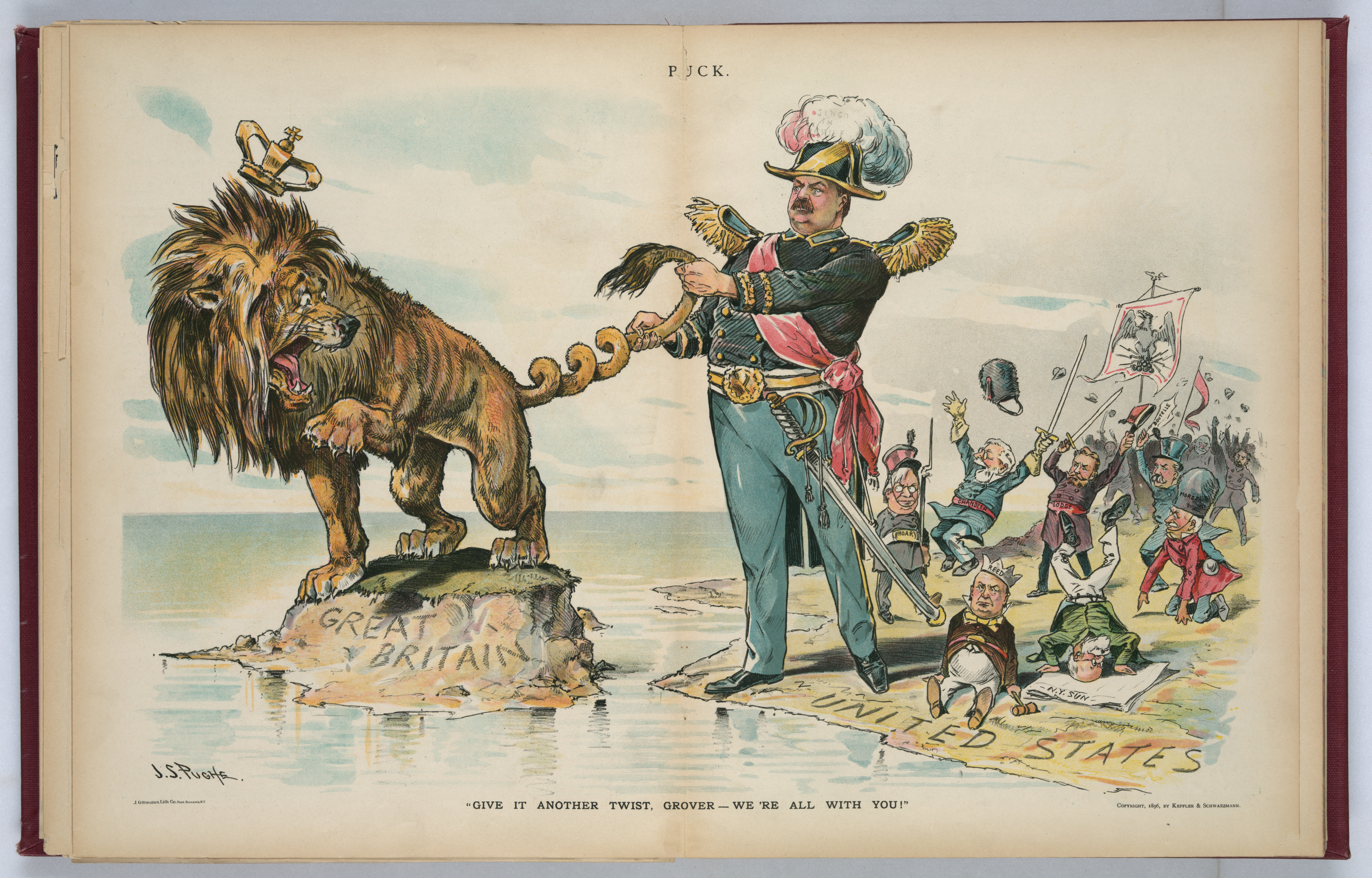
President Cleveland twists the tail of the British Lion regarding Venezuela, a policy hailed by Irish Catholics in the United States, as depicted in a cartoon published in Puck by J.S. Pughe in 1895

In 1895 a new crisis erupted in South America. A border dispute between British Guiana and Venezuela caused a crisis when Washington spoke out to take Venezuela's side. Propaganda sponsored by Venezuela convinced American public opinion that the British were infringing on Venezuelan territory. Prime Minister Salisbury stood firm. The crisis escalated when President Grover Cleveland, citing the Monroe Doctrine, issued an ultimatum in late 1895. Salisbury's cabinet convinced him he had to go to arbitration. Both sides calmed down and the issue was quickly resolved through arbitration which largely upheld the British position on the legal boundary line. Salisbury remained angry but a consensus was reached in London, led by Lord Landsdowne, to seek much friendlier relations with the United States. By standing with a Latin American nation against the encroachment of the British, the US improved relations with the Latin Americans, and the cordial manner of the procedure improved diplomatic relations with Britain.

The Olney-Pauncefote Treaty of 1897 was a proposed treaty between the US and Britain in 1897 that required arbitration of major disputes. Despite wide public and elite support, the treaty was rejected by the US Senate, which was jealous of its prerogatives, and never went into effect.

Arbitration was used to settle the dispute over the boundary between Alaska and Canada, but the Canadians felt betrayed by the result. American and Russian diplomats drawing up the treaty for the Alaska Purchase of 1867 drew the boundary between Canada and Alaska in ambiguous fashion. With the gold rush into the Canadian Yukon in 1898, miners had to enter through Alaska. Canada wanted the boundary redrawn to obtain its own seaport. Canada rejected the American offer of a long-term lease on an American port. The issue went to arbitration and the Alaska boundary dispute was finally resolved by an arbitration in 1903. The decision favoured the US when the British judge sided with the three American judges against the two Canadian judges on the arbitration panel. Canadian public opinion was outraged that their interests were sacrificed by London for the benefit of British-American harmony.

=== The Great Rapprochement ===
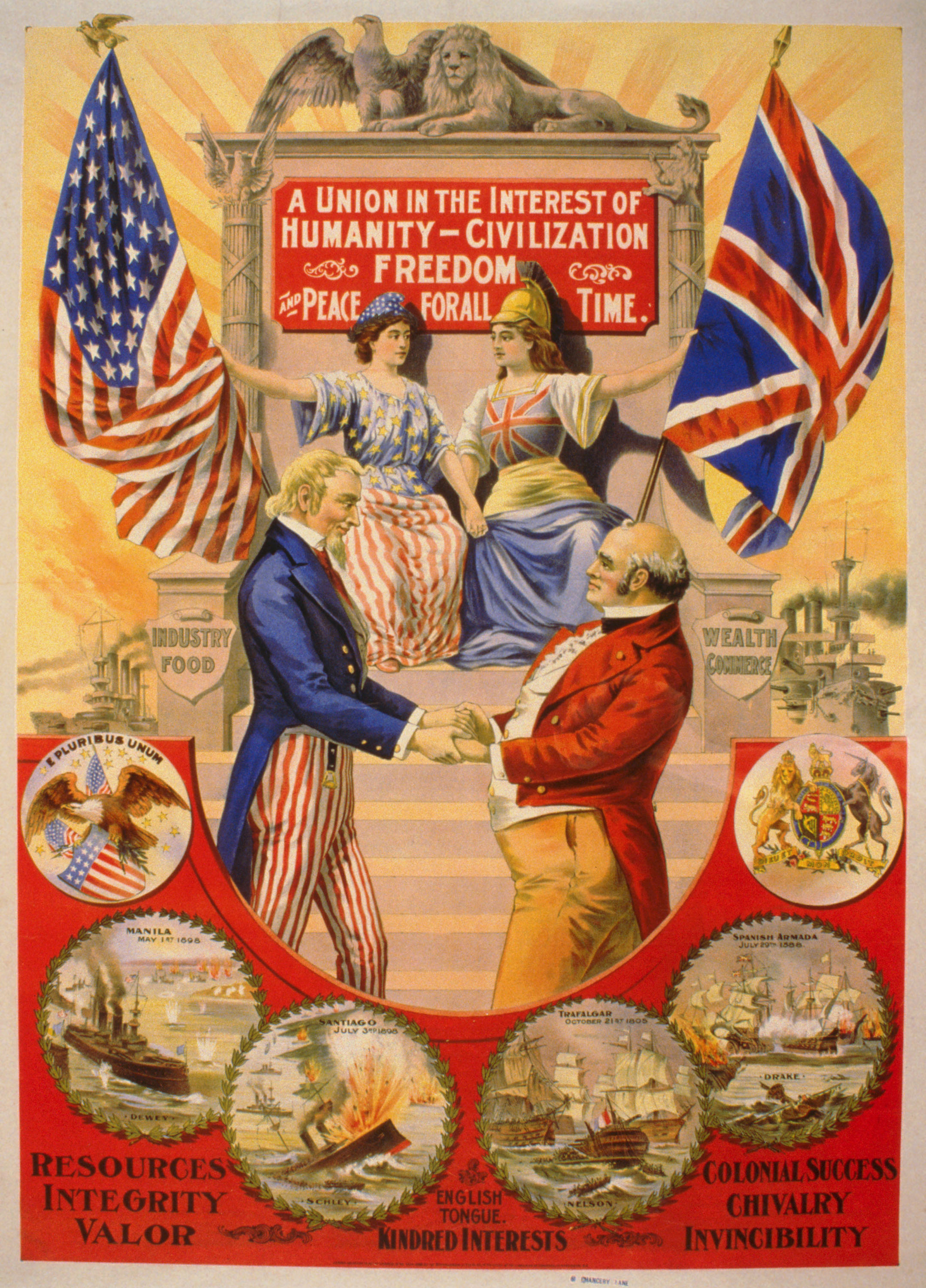
This 1898 depiction of the Great Rapprochement shows Uncle Sam embracing John Bull while Columbia and Britannia sit together and hold hands.

The Great Rapprochement is the convergence of social and political objectives between London and Washington from 1895 until World War I began in 1914. This was despite a large Irish Catholic element in the United States, which provided a major base for demands of Irish independence.

The most notable sign of improving relations during the Great Rapprochement was Britain's actions during the Spanish–American War of 1898. Initially London supported Madrid and its colonial rule over Cuba, since the perceived threat of American occupation and a territorial acquisition of Cuba by the United States might harm British trade and commercial interests within its own possessions in the West Indies. However, after the United States made genuine assurances that it would grant Cuba's independence (which eventually occurred in 1902), the British abandoned this policy and ultimately sided with the United States, unlike most other European powers who supported Spain. In return Washington supported Britain during the Boer War, although many Americans favored the Boers.

Victory in the Spanish–American War had given the United States an imperialistic influence overseas. The US and Britain supported the Open Door Policy in China, blocking the expansion of other empires. Both nations contributed soldiers to the Eight-Nation Alliance which suppressed the Boxer Rebellion in China in 1900.

The naval blockade of several months (1902-1903) imposed against Venezuela by Britain, Germany and Italy over President Cipriano Castro's refusal to pay foreign debts and damages suffered by European citizens in a recent failed civil war. Castro assumed that the Monroe Doctrine would see the US prevent European military intervention, but at the time President Theodore Roosevelt saw the Doctrine as concerning European seizure of territory, rather than intervention per se. Roosevelt also was concerned with the threat of penetration into the region by Germany and Britain. With Castro failing to back down under US pressure and increasingly negative British and American press reactions to the affair, President Roosevelt persuaded the blockading nations to agree to a compromise, but maintained the blockade during negotiations over the details of refinancing the debt on Washington Protocols. This incident was a major driver of the Roosevelt Corollary and the subsequent US Big Stick policy and Dollar Diplomacy in Latin America.

In 1907–09, President Roosevelt sent the "Great White Fleet" on an international tour, to demonstrate the power projection of the United States' blue-water navy, which had become second only to the Royal Navy in size and firepower.

=== World War I ===
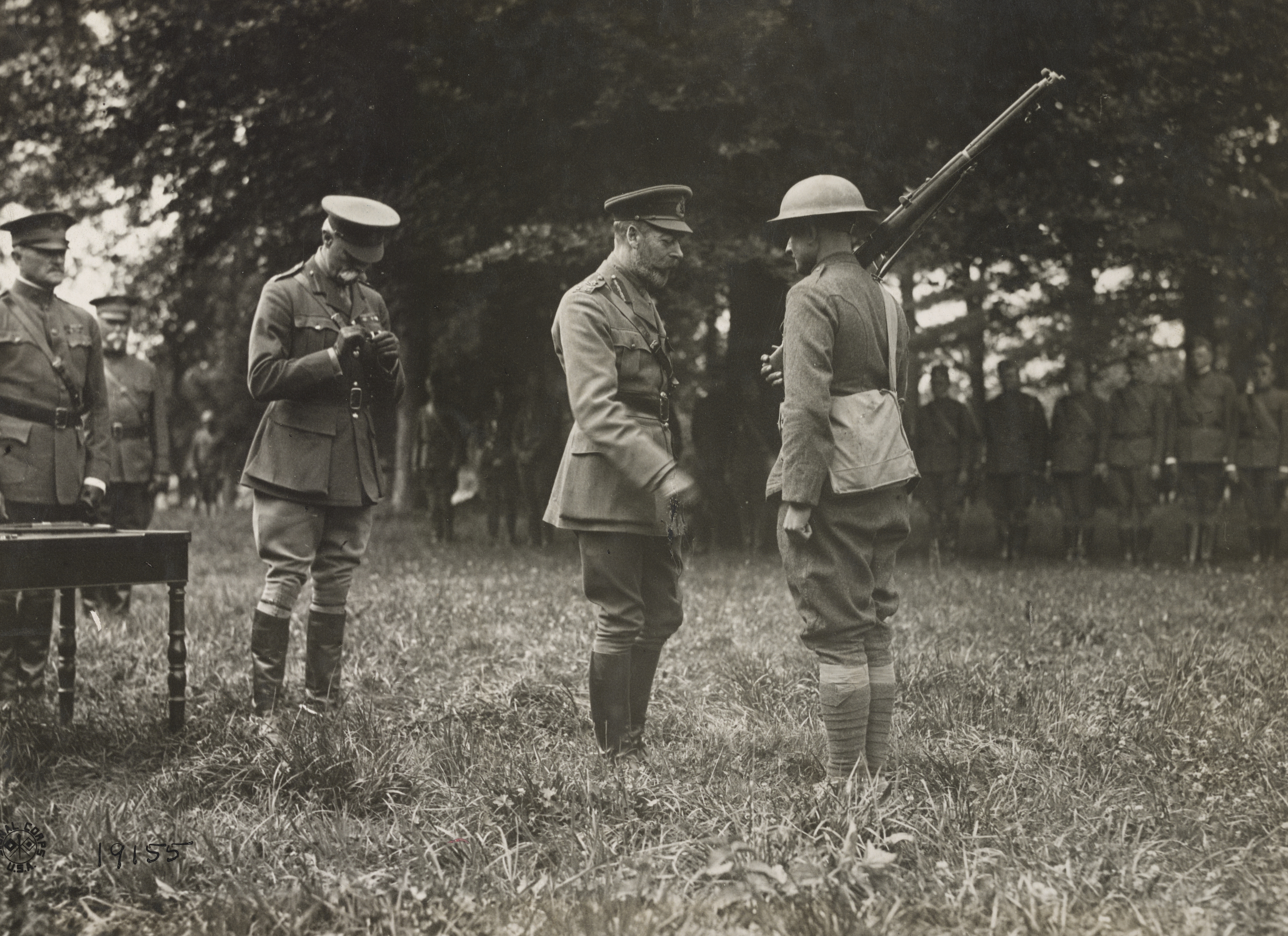
An American doughboy receiving an award from King George V

The United States had a policy of strict neutrality and was willing to export any product to any country. Germany could not import anything due to the British blockade and British control over exports to neutral countries neighboring Germany. American trade escalated to the Allied Powers, especially in farm products. British purchases were financed by the sale of American assets owned by the British. When that was exhausted the British borrowed heavily from New York banks. When that credit ran dry in late 1916, a financial crisis was at hand for Britain.

American public opinion moved steadily against Germany, especially in the wake of the Belgian atrocities in 1914 and the sinking of the RMS Lusitania in 1915. The large German American and Irish Catholic element called for staying out of the war, but the German Americans were increasingly marginalised. Berlin renewed unrestricted submarine warfare in 1917 knowing it would lead to war with the US. Germany's invitation to Mexico to join in war against the US in the Zimmermann Telegram was the last straw, and the US declared war in April 1917. The Balfour Mission in April and May tried to promote cooperation between the UK and US. The Americans planned to send money, food and munitions, but it soon became clear that millions of soldiers would be needed to decide the war on the Western Front.

The US sent two million soldiers to Europe under the command of General John J. Pershing, with more on the way as the war ended. Many of the Allied forces were skeptical of the competence of the American Expeditionary Force, which in 1917 was severely lacking in training and experience. By summer 1918, the American doughboys were arriving at 10,000 a day, as the German forces were shrinking because they had run out of manpower.

In December 1918 after victory in the World War, President Wilson told a British official in London: “You must not speak of us who come over here as cousins, still less as brothers; we are neither. Neither must you think of us as Anglo-Saxons, for that term can no longer be rightly applied to the people of the United States....There are only two things which can establish and maintain closer relations between your country and mine: they are community of ideals and of interests." The first summit conference took place in London in late 1918, between Wilson and Prime Minister David Lloyd George. It went poorly, as Wilson distrusted Lloyd George as a schemer, and Lloyd George grumbled that the president was excessively moralistic. The two did work together at the Paris Peace Conference, 1919, as part of the Big Four. They moderated the demands of French Prime Minister Georges Clemenceau to permanently weaken Germany's new Weimar Republic. Lloyd George later quipped that sitting between them was like "being seated between Jesus Christ and Napoleon".

John W. Davis (1873-1955) served as Wilson's ambassador from 1918 to 1921. A Southerner from West Virginia, he reflected deep Southern support for Wilsonianism, based on a reborn patriotism, a distrust of the Republican Party, and a resurgence of Anglophilism. Davis proselytized in London for the League of Nations based on his paternalistic belief that peace depended primarily on Anglo-American friendship and leadership. He was disappointed by Wilson's mismanagement of the treaty ratification and by Republican isolationism and distrust of the League.

=== Inter-war years ===
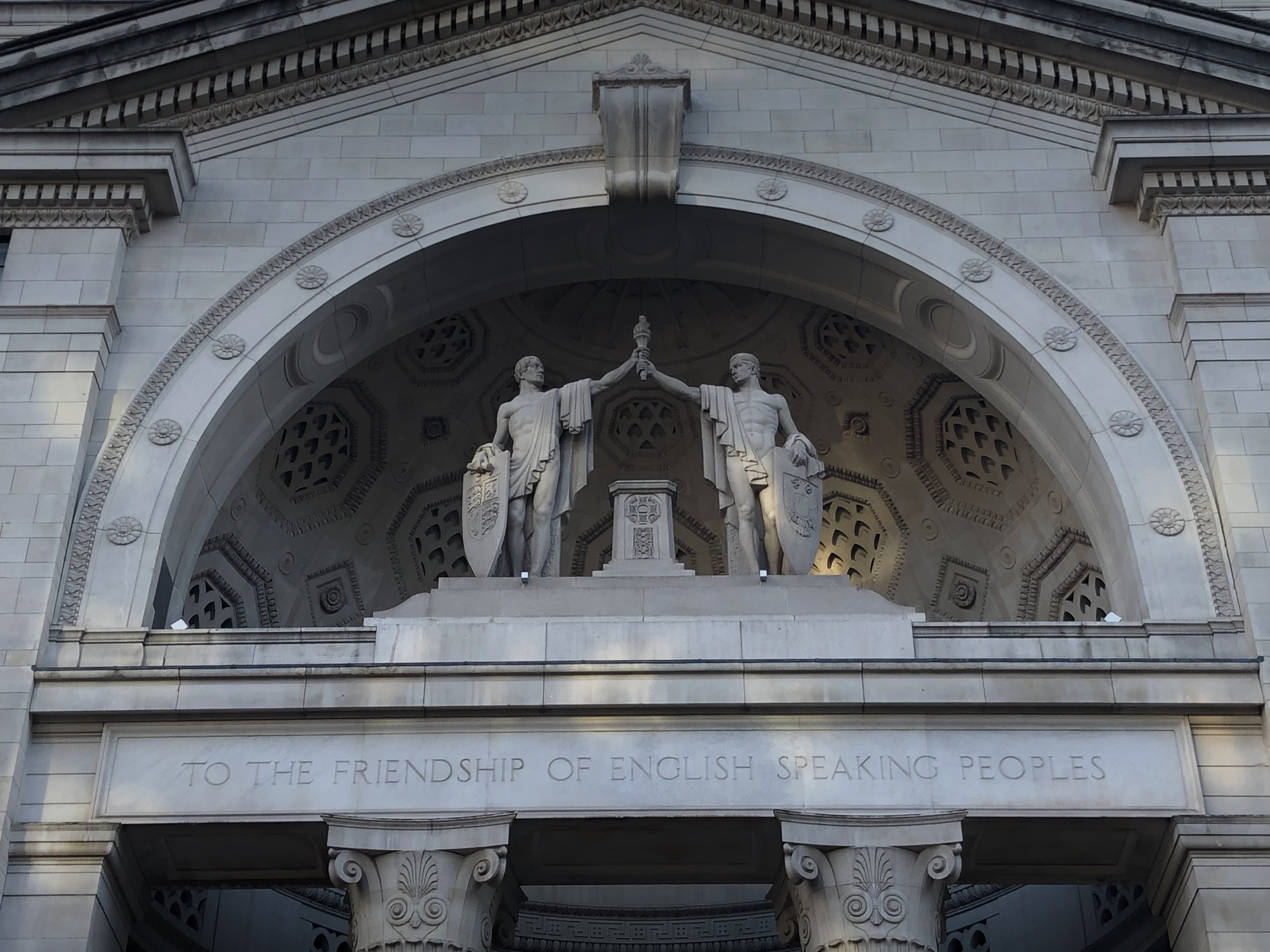
To the Friendship of English speaking people's monument on Bush House in London. The two men holding a torch represent the United Kingdom (left) and the United States (right).

Throughout the 1920s and 1930s, the level of mutual hostility was moderately high. The British diplomatic establishment largely distrusted the United States for a series of reasons. They included British suspicion of America's newfound global power, intentions and reliability. Specific frictions included the American rejection of the League of Nations, the refusal to cancel the war debts owed by Britain to the US treasury, the high American tariff of 1930, and especially Franklin Roosevelt's sudden devastating withdrawal from the 1933 London economic conference, In both countries, the other side lost popularity. Americans disliked the British Empire, particularly its rule in India. Though Irish independence removed the main source of Anglo-American tensions, the Irish-American community was nevertheless slow to drop its historic antagonism. Roosevelt himself publicly stated his support for the self-determination of colonized countries.

Despite the frictions, London realized the United States was now the strongest power, and made it a cardinal principle of British foreign-policy to "cultivate the closest relations with the United States". As a result, Britain decided not to renew its military alliance with Japan, which was becoming a major rival to the United States in the Pacific.

President Warren Harding sponsored a successful Washington Naval Conference in 1922 that largely ended the naval arms race for a decade. The rise of American naval power in 1916-1918 marked the end of the Royal Navy's superiority, an eclipse acknowledged in the Washington Naval Treaty of 1922, when the United States and Britain agreed to equal tonnage quotas on warships. By 1932, the 1922 treaty was not renewed and Britain, Japan and the US were again in a naval race.

In 1924, the aristocratic diplomat Esmé Howard returned to Washington as ambassador. Puzzled at first by the provincial background and eccentric style of President Calvin Coolidge, Howard came to like and trust the president, realizing that he was conciliatory and eager to find solutions to mutual problems, such as the Liquor Treaty of 1924 which diminished friction over smuggling. Washington was greatly pleased when Britain ended its alliance with Japan. Both nations were pleased when in 1923 the wartime debt problem was compromised on satisfactory terms. London renegotiated its £978 million debt to the US Treasury by promising regular payments of £34 million for ten years then £40 million for 52 years. The idea was for the US to loan money to Germany, which in turn paid reparations to Britain, which in turn paid off its loans from the US government. In 1931 all German payments ended, and in 1932 Britain suspended its payments to the US, which angered American public opinion. The British debt was finally repaid after 1945.

The League of Nations was established, but Wilson refused to negotiate with Republican supporters of the League. They objected to the provision that allowed the League to force the United States to join in a war declared by the League without the approval of Congress or the president. The Treaty of Versailles was defeated in the Senate. The United States never joined the League, leaving Britain and France to dominate the organization. In any case, it had very little effect on major issues and was replaced in 1946 with a United Nations, Largely designed by Roosevelt and his staff, in which both Britain and the United States had veto power. Major conferences, especially the Washington Conference of 1922 occurred outside League auspices. The US refused to send official delegates to League committees, instead sending unofficial "observers".

Coolidge was impressed with the success of the Washington Naval Conference of 1921–22, and called the second international conference in 1927 to deal with related naval issues, especially putting limits on the number of warships under 10,000 tons. The conference met in Geneva. It failed because France refused to participate, and most of the delegates were admirals who did not want to limit their fleets. Coolidge listened to his own admirals, but President Hoover did not, and in 1930 did achieve a naval agreement with Britain. A second summit took place between President Herbert Hoover and Prime Minister Ramsay MacDonald in the United States in 1929. Both men were seriously devoted to peace, and the meeting went smoothly in discussions regarding naval arms limitations, and the application of the Kellogg–Briand Pact peace pact of 1928. One result was the successful London Naval Treaty of 1930, which continued the warship limitations among the major powers first set out in 1922.

During the Great Depression, starting in late 1929, the US was preoccupied with its own internal affairs and economic recovery, espousing an isolationist policy. When the US raised tariffs in 1930, the British retaliated by raising their tariffs against outside countries (such as the US) while giving special trade preferences inside the Commonwealth. The US demanded these special trade preferences be ended in 1946 in exchange for a large loan.

From 1929 to 1932, the overall world total of all trade plunged by over two-thirds, while trade between the US and Britain shrank from $848 million to $288 million, a decline of two-thirds (66%). Proponents of the high 1930 tariff it never expected this, and support for high tariffs rapidly eroded.

When Britain in 1933 called a worldwide London Economic Conference to help resolve the depression, President Franklin D. Roosevelt stunned the world by suddenly refusing to cooperate, ending Conference usefulness overnight.

Tensions over the Irish question faded with the independence of the Irish Free State in 1922. The American Irish had achieved their goal, and in 1938 their most outstanding spokesmen Joseph P. Kennedy, a Democrat close to Roosevelt, became ambassador to the Court of St. James's. He moved in high London society and his daughter married into the aristocracy. Kennedy supported the Neville Chamberlain policy of appeasement toward Germany, and when the war began he advised Washington that prospects for Britain's survival were bleak. When Winston Churchill came to power in 1940, Kennedy lost all his influence in London and Washington. Washington analysts paid more attention to the measured optimism of Lieutenant Colonel Bradford G. Chynoweth, the War Department's military attache in London.

=== World War II ===
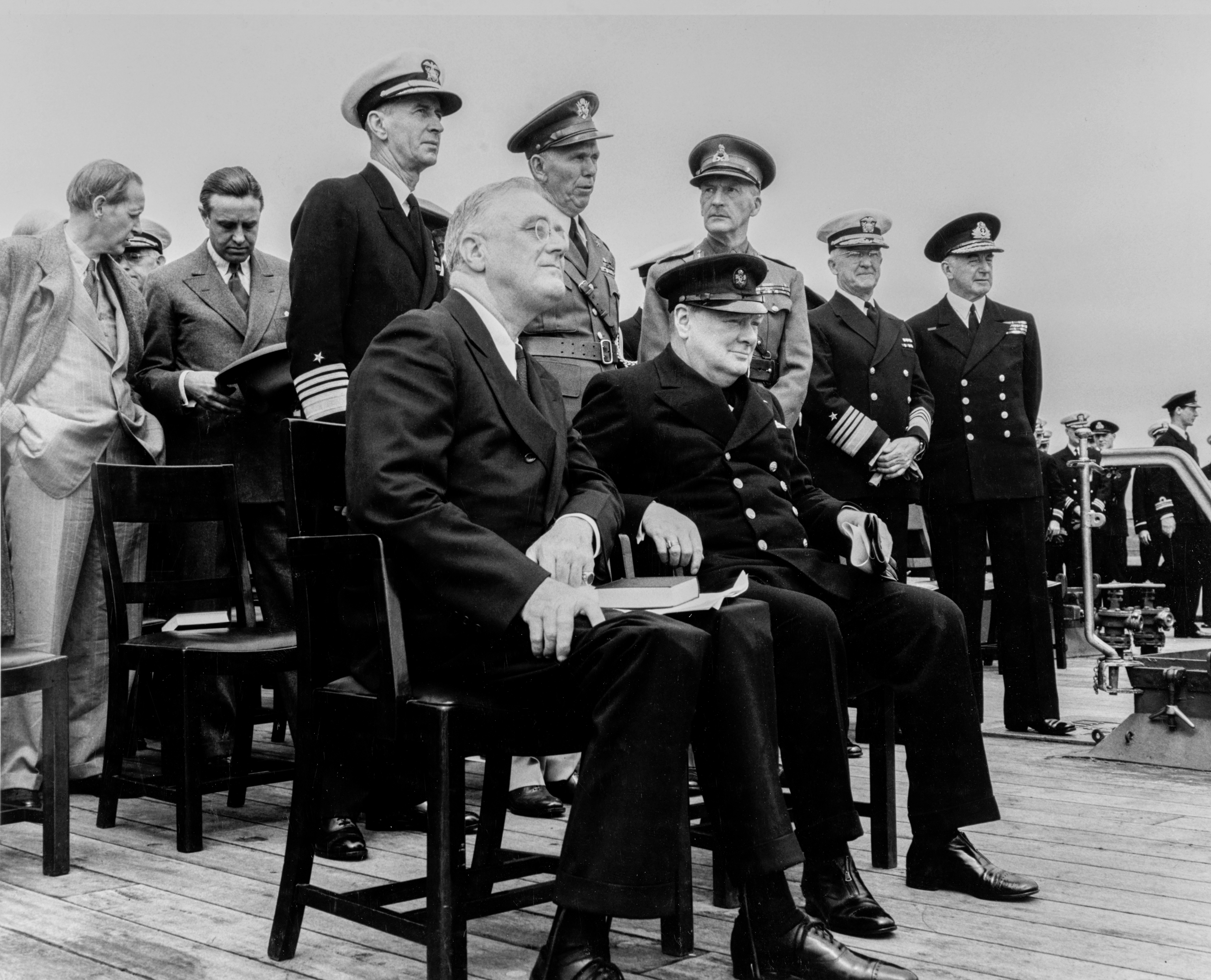
Roosevelt and Churchill drafted the Atlantic Charter in August 1941.

Although many of the American people were sympathetic to Britain during the war with Nazi Germany, there was widespread opposition to American intervention in European affairs. This was reflected in a series of Neutrality Acts ratified by the United States Congress in 1935, 1936, and 1937. However, President Roosevelt's policy of cash-and-carry still allowed Britain and France to order munitions from the United States and carry them home. As ambassador to the United States in 1939–40, Lord Lothian supported Lend-Lease and urged Prime Minister Winston Churchill to work more closely with President Franklin Roosevelt. His success can be attributed to his understanding of American politics and culture, his skills in traditional diplomacy, his role as intermediary between Churchill and Roosevelt, and the efficiency of Britain's wartime propaganda agencies.

Winston Churchill, who had long warned against Nazi Germany and demanded rearmament, became prime minister after his predecessor Neville Chamberlain's policy of appeasement had totally collapsed and Britain was unable to reverse the German invasion of Norway in April 1940. After the fall of France in June 1940, Roosevelt gave Britain and (after June 1941) the Soviet Union all aid short of war. The Destroyers for Bases Agreement which was signed in September 1940, gave the United States a 99-year rent-free lease of numerous land and air bases throughout the British Empire in exchange for the Royal Navy receiving 50 old destroyers from the United States Navy. Beginning in March 1941, the United States enacted Lend-Lease in the form of tanks, fighter airplanes, munitions, bullets, food, and medical supplies. Britain received $31.4 billion out of a total of $50.1 billion sent to the Allies. Roosevelt insisted on avoiding the blunder that Wilson had made in the First World War of setting up the financing as loans that had to be repaid by the recipients. Lend lease aid was freely given, with no payments. There were also cash loans were repaid at low rates over a half-century.

Summit meetings became a standard practice starting with August 1941, when Churchill and Roosevelt met in Newfoundland, and announced the Atlantic Charter. It became a fundamental document—All the Allies had to sign it—and it led to the formation of the United Nations. Shortly after the Pearl Harbor attack, Churchill spent several weeks in Washington with the senior staff hammering out wartime strategy with the American counterparts at the Arcadia Conference. They set up the Combined Chiefs of Staff to plot and coordinate strategy and operations. Military cooperation was close and successful.

Technical collaboration was even closer, as the two nations shared secrets and weapons regarding the proximity fuze (fuse) and radar, as well as airplane engines, Nazi codes, and the atomic bomb.

Millions of American servicemen were based in Britain during the war. Americans were paid five times more than comparable British servicemen, which led to a certain amount of friction with British men and intermarriage with British women.

In 1945 Britain sent a portion of the British fleet to assist the planned October invasion of Japan by the United States, but this was cancelled when Japan was forced to surrender unconditionally in August.

==== Pre-Independence India ====
Serious tension erupted over American demands that India be given independence, a proposition Churchill vehemently rejected. For years Roosevelt had encouraged Britain's disengagement from India. The American position was based on principled opposition to colonialism, practical concern for the outcome of the war, and the expectation of a large American role in a post-colonial era. In 1942 when the Congress Party launched a Quit India movement, the colonial authorities arrested tens of thousands of activists (including Mahatma Gandhi). Meanwhile, India became the main American staging base for aid to China. Churchill threatened to resign if Roosevelt continued to push his demands, and Roosevelt backed down. Churchill was a believer in the integrity of the British Empire, but he was voted out of office in the summer of 1945. Attlee's new Labour government was much more favorable toward Indian aspirations. The process of de-colonization was highlighted by the independence Britain granted to India, Pakistan and Ceylon (now Sri Lanka) in 1947. The United States approved, but provided no financial or diplomatic support.

== Cold War ==
=== Postwar financial troubles and The Marshall Plan (1945-1952) ===
In the aftermath of the war Britain faced a deep financial crisis, whereas the United States enjoyed an economic boom. The United States continued to finance the British treasury after the war. Much of this aid was designed to restore infrastructure and help refugees. Britain received an emergency loan of $3.75 billion in 1946; it was a 50-year loan with a low 2% interest rate. A more permanent solution was the Marshall Plan of 1948–51, which poured $13 billion into western Europe, of which $3.3 billion went to Britain to help modernise its infrastructure and business practices. The aid was a gift and carried requirements that Britain balance its budget, control tariffs and maintain adequate currency reserves. The American goals for the Marshall plan were to help rebuild the postwar economy in Europe, help modernize the economies, and minimize trade barriers. When the Soviet Union refused to participate or allow its satellites to participate, the Marshall plan became an element of the emerging Cold War. The British Labour government was an enthusiastic participant.

There were political tensions between the two nations regarding Marshall plan requirements. London was dubious about Washington's emphasis on European economic integration as the solution to postwar recovery. Integration with Europe at this point would mean cutting close ties to the emerging Commonwealth. London tried to convince Washington that American economic aid, especially to the sterling currency area, was necessary to solve the dollar shortage. British economists argued that their position was validated by 1950 as European industrial production exceeded prewar levels. Washington demanded convertibility of sterling currency on July 15, 1947, which produced a severe financial crisis for Britain. Convertibility was suspended on August 20, 1947. However, by 1950, American rearmament and heavy spending on the Korean War and Cold War finally ended the dollar shortage. The balance of payment problems for the postwar government was caused less by economic decline and more by political overreach, according to Jim Tomlinson.

=== Truman doctrine and emerging Cold War 1947–1953 ===
The Labour government, which was alarmed at the threat of Communism in the Balkans, implored the US to take over the British role in the Greek Civil War, which led to the Truman Doctrine in 1947, with financial and military aid to Greece and Turkey as Britain withdrew from the region.

The need to form a united front against the Soviet threat compelled the US and Britain to cooperate in helping to form the North Atlantic Treaty Organization with their European allies. NATO is a mutual defence alliance whereby an attack on one member country is deemed an attack on all members.

The United States had an anti-colonial and anti-communist stance in its foreign policy throughout the Cold War. Military forces from the United States and the United Kingdom were heavily involved in the Korean War, fighting under a United Nations mandate. A military stalemate finally led to an armistice that ended the fighting in 1953. During the same year British and American intelligence agencies worked together and were instrumental in supporting the 1953 Iranian coup d'état whereby the Iranian military restored the Shah to power.

In 1954 the US attempted to help the beleaguered French Army at the height of the Battle of Dien Bien Phu in Vietnam. They planned Operation Vulture; a planned aerial assault on the opposing communist Viet Minh siege positions. President Dwight D. Eisenhower made American participation reliant on British support, but Foreign Secretary Sir Anthony Eden was opposed and Vulture was reluctantly cancelled. With the fall of Dien Bien Phu the US Secretary of State John Foster Dulles fell out with Eden. He left the 1954 Geneva Conference, leaving the US to avoid direct association with the negotiations that led to the creation of the Democratic Republic of Vietnam.

=== Angry denial: the Suez Crisis of 1956 ===
The Suez Crisis erupted in October 1956 after Britain, France and Israel invaded Egypt to regain control of the Suez Canal. Eisenhower had repeatedly warned London against any such action, and feared a collapse of Western influence in the region. Furthermore, there was risk of a wider war, after the Soviet Union threatened to intervene on the Egyptian side and did invade Hungary to suppress a revolt. Washington responded with heavy financial and diplomatic pressure to force the invaders to withdraw. British post-war debt was so large that economic sanctions could have caused a devaluation of sterling. This would be a disaster and when it became clear that the international sanctions were serious, the invaders withdrew. Anthony Eden soon resigned as prime minister, leaving office with a ruined reputation. The world noted Britain's fall from status in the Middle East and worldwide. Anglo-American cooperation fell to the lowest point since the 1890s.

However, the new prime minister Harold Macmillan (1957–1963) restored good terms with Eisenhower and President John F. Kennedy (1961–1963). Intimacy and warmth characterized his relationship with the latter who appointed David K. E. Bruce as ambassador.

=== Lyndon Johnson and Harold Wilson: 1963–1969 ===
After Kennedy's assassination President Lyndon B. Johnson (1963–1969) kept ambassador Bruce but ignored all his recommendations. Bruce sought closer ties with Britain and greater European unity. Bruce's reports regarding Britain's financial condition were pessimistic and alarmist. With regard to Vietnam, Bruce privately questioned US involvement and constantly urged the Johnson administration to allow Britain more of a role in bringing the conflict to an end. The British ambassador was Sir Patrick Dean (1965-1969). Dean was preoccupied with sharp difficulties over Vietnam and British military commitments east of Suez. He promoted mutual understanding but was largely ignored by Johnson because the traditional Anglo-American relationship was decaying and Johnson disliked diplomats. London, furthermore, relied less and less on ambassadors and embassies.

Through the US-UK Mutual Defence Agreement signed in 1958, the UK and US resumed military technological cooperation on nuclear weapons, which had been prevented by the 1946 US Atomic Energy Act of 1946 (otherwise known as the Mcmahon Act). Britain's independent nuclear programme was increasingly hampered by funding issues, and the cancellation of the British Blue Streak ballistic missile in 1960 necessitated the purchase of the US Skybolt system. In April 1963, the Polaris Sales Agreement established a basis for the sale of the US UGM-27 Polaris ballistic missile for use in the Royal Navy's submarine fleet starting in 1968.

The American containment policy called for military resistance to the expansion of communism, and the Vietnam War became the main battlefield in the 1950s down to the communist victory in 1975. Prime Minister Harold Wilson (1964-1970) believed in a strong "Special Relationship" and wanted to highlight his dealings with the White House to strengthen his own prestige as a statesman. President Lyndon B. Johnson disliked Wilson, and ignored any "special" relationship. He agreed to provide financial help but he strongly opposed British plans to devalue the pound and withdraw military units east of Suez. As the American military involvement deepened after 1964, Johnson repeatedly asked for British ground units to validate international support for American intervention. Wilson never sent troops, but British intelligence, training in jungle warfare, and verbal support was provided. He also took the initiative in attempting numerous mediation schemes, typically involving Russian intervention, none of which gained traction. Wilson's policy divided the Labour Party; the Conservative opposition generally supported the American position on Vietnam. Issues of foreign policy were rarely salient in general elections. Wilson and Johnson also differed sharply on British economic weakness and its declining status as a world power. Historian Jonathan Colman concludes it made for the most unsatisfactory "special" relationship in the 20th century.

The tone of the relationship was set early on when Johnson sent Secretary of State Dean Rusk as head of the American delegation to the state funeral of Winston Churchill in January 1965, rather than the new vice president, Hubert Humphrey. Johnson himself had been hospitalized with influenza and advised by his doctors against attending the funeral. This perceived slight generated much criticism against the president, both in the UK and in the US. Johnson said during a press conference that not sending Humphrey was a "mistake."

=== 1970s ===
Edward Heath (Prime minister 1970–74) and Richard Nixon (President 1969–74) maintained a close working relationship. Heath deviated from his predecessors by supporting Nixon's decision to bomb Hanoi and Haiphong in Vietnam in April 1972. Nevertheless, relations deteriorated noticeably during the early 1970s. Throughout his premiership, Heath insisted on using the phrase "natural relationship" instead of "special relationship" to refer to Anglo-American relations, acknowledging the historical and cultural similarities but carefully denying anything special beyond that. Heath was determined to restore a measure of equality to Anglo-American relations which the United States had increasingly dominated as the power and economy of the United Kingdom flagged in the post-colonial era.

Heath's renewed push for British admittance to the European Economic Community (EEC) brought new tensions between the United Kingdom and the United States. French President Charles De Gaulle, who believed that British entry would allow undue American influence on the organisation, had vetoed previous British attempts at entry. Heath's final bid benefited from the more moderate views of Georges Pompidou, De Gaulle's successor as President of France, and his own Eurocentric foreign policy schedule. The Nixon administration viewed this bid as a pivot away from close ties with the United States in favour of continental Europe. After Britain's admission to the EEC in 1973, Heath confirmed this interpretation by notifying his American counterparts that the United Kingdom would henceforth be formulating European policies with other EEC members before discussing them with the United States. Furthermore, Heath indicated his potential willingness to consider a nuclear partnership with France and questioned what the United Kingdom got in return for American use of British military and intelligence facilities worldwide. In return, Nixon and his Secretary of State Henry Kissinger briefly cut off the Anglo-American intelligence tap in August 1973. Kissinger then attempted to restore American influence in Europe with his abortive 1973 "Year of Europe" policy plan to update the NATO agreements. Members of the Heath administration, including Heath himself in later years, regarded this announcement with derision.

In 1973, American and British officials disagreed in their handling of the Arab-Israeli Yom Kippur War. While the Nixon administration immediately increased military aid to Israel, Heath maintained British neutrality in the conflict and imposed a British arms embargo on all combatants, which mostly hindered the Israelis by preventing them obtaining spares for their Centurion tanks. Anglo-American disagreement intensified over Nixon's unilateral decision to elevate American forces, stationed at British bases, to DEFCON 3 status on October 25 in response to the breakdown of the United Nations ceasefire. Heath disallowed American intelligence gathering, resupplying, or refueling from British bases in Cyprus, which greatly limited the effective range of American reconnaissance planes. In return, Kissinger imposed a second intelligence cutoff over this disagreement and some in the administration even suggested that the United States should refuse to assist in the British missile upgrade to the Polaris system. Tensions between the United States and United Kingdom relaxed as the second ceasefire took effect. Wilson's return to power in 1974 helped to return Anglo-American relations to normality.

On July 23, 1977, officials from the United Kingdom and the United States renegotiated the previous Bermuda I Agreement, and signed the Bermuda II Agreement under which only four airlines, two from the United Kingdom and two from the United States, were allowed to operate flights between London Heathrow Airport and specified "gateway cities" in the United States. The Bermuda II Agreement was in effect for nearly 30 years until it was eventually replaced by the EU-US Open Skies Agreement, which was signed on April 30, 2007, and entered into effect on March 30, 2008.

=== 1980s ===
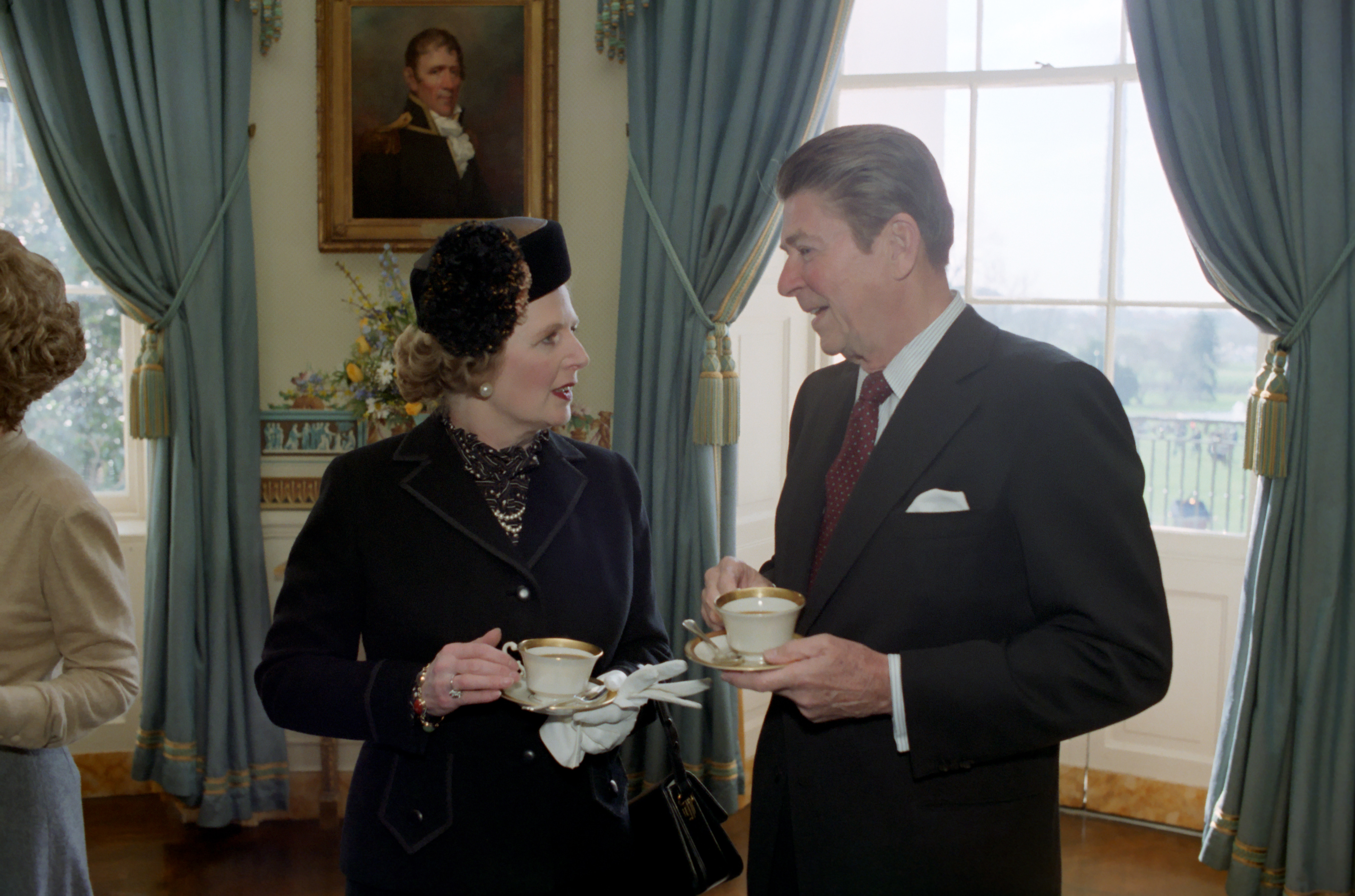
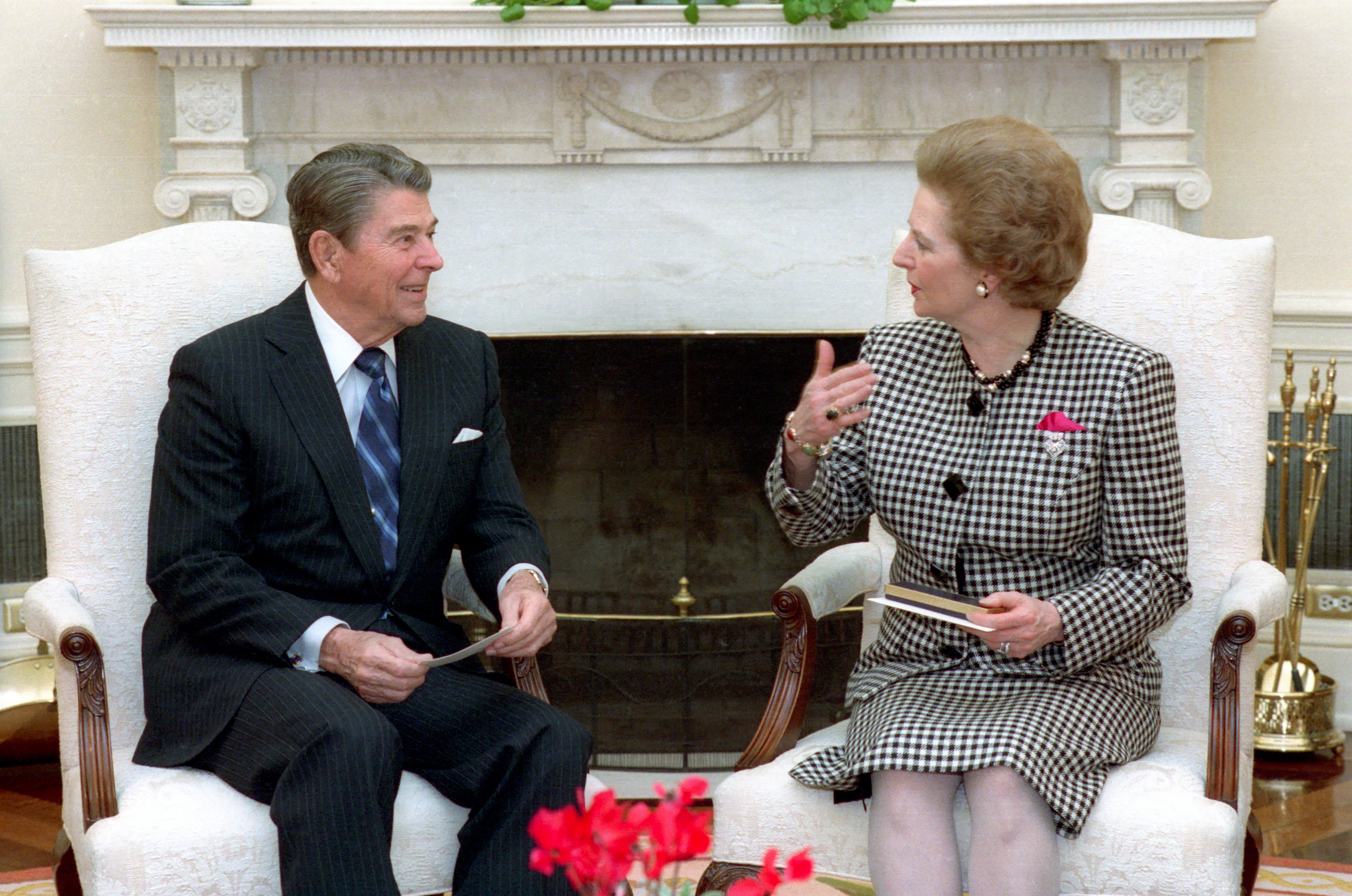
Ronald Reagan with close ally and personal friend Margaret Thatcher during the 1980s

Margaret Thatcher (Prime Minister, 1979–1990) and Ronald Reagan (President, 1981–1989) bonded quickly. According to David Cannadine:

In many ways they were very different figures: he was sunny, genial, charming, relaxed, upbeat, and with little intellectual curiosity or command of policy detail; she was domineering, belligerent, confrontational, tireless, hyperactive, and with an unrivalled command of facts and figures. But the chemistry between them worked. Reagan had been grateful for her interest in him at a time when the British establishment refused to take him seriously; she agreed with him about the importance of creating wealth, cutting taxes, and building up stronger defences against Soviet Russia; and both believed in liberty and free-market freedom, and in the need to outface what Reagan would later call 'the evil empire'.

Throughout the 1980s, Thatcher was strongly supportive of Reagan's unwavering stance towards the Soviet Union. Often described as "political soulmates" and a high point in the "Special Relationship", Reagan and Thatcher met many times throughout their political careers, speaking in concert when confronting Soviet general secretary Mikhail Gorbachev. During the Soviet–Afghan War, Britain was covertly involved and helped support the US military and financial aid to the anti communist mujaheddin insurgents in Operation Cyclone.

In 1982, the British Government made a request to the United States, which the Americans agreed upon in principle, to sell the Trident II D5 ballistic missile, associated equipment, and related system support for use on four Vanguard-class nuclear submarines in the Royal Navy. The Trident II D5 ballistic missile replaced the United Kingdom's previous use of the UGM-27 Polaris ballistic missile, beginning in the mid-1990s.

In the Falklands War in 1982, the United States initially tried to mediate between the United Kingdom and Argentina, but ended up supporting the United Kingdom's counter-invasion. The US supplied the British Armed Forces with equipment as well as logistical support.

In October 1983, the United States and an Organisation of Eastern Caribbean States coalition undertook Operation Urgent Fury, the invasion of the Commonwealth island nation of Grenada following a Marxist coup. Neighboring countries in the region asked the United States to intervene militarily, which it did successfully despite having made assurances to a deeply resentful British Government.

On April 15, 1986, the US military under President Reagan launched Operation El Dorado Canyon, a bombing of Tripoli and Benghazi in Libya, from Royal Air Force stations in England with the permission of Prime Minister Thatcher. It was a counter-attack by the United States in response to Libyan state-sponsored terrorism directed towards civilians and American servicemen under Muammar Gaddafi, especially the 1986 West Berlin discotheque bombing.

On December 21, 1988, Pan American Worldways' Flight 103 from London Heathrow Airport to New York's John F. Kennedy International Airport exploded over the town of Lockerbie, Scotland, killing 189 Americans and 40 Britons on board. The motive that is generally attributed to Libya can be traced back to a series of military confrontations with the United States Navy in the 1980s in the Gulf of Sidra, the whole of which Libya claimed as its territorial waters. Despite a guilty verdict on January 31, 2001, by the Scottish High Court of Justiciary which ruled against Abdelbaset al-Megrahi, the bomber, on charges of murder and conspiracy to commit murder, Libya never formally admitted carrying out the 1988 bombing over Scotland until 2003.

During the Soviet–Afghan War, the United States and the United Kingdom throughout the 1980s provided arms to the Mujahideen rebels in Afghanistan until the last troops from the Soviet Union left Afghanistan in February 1989.

== Gallery ==
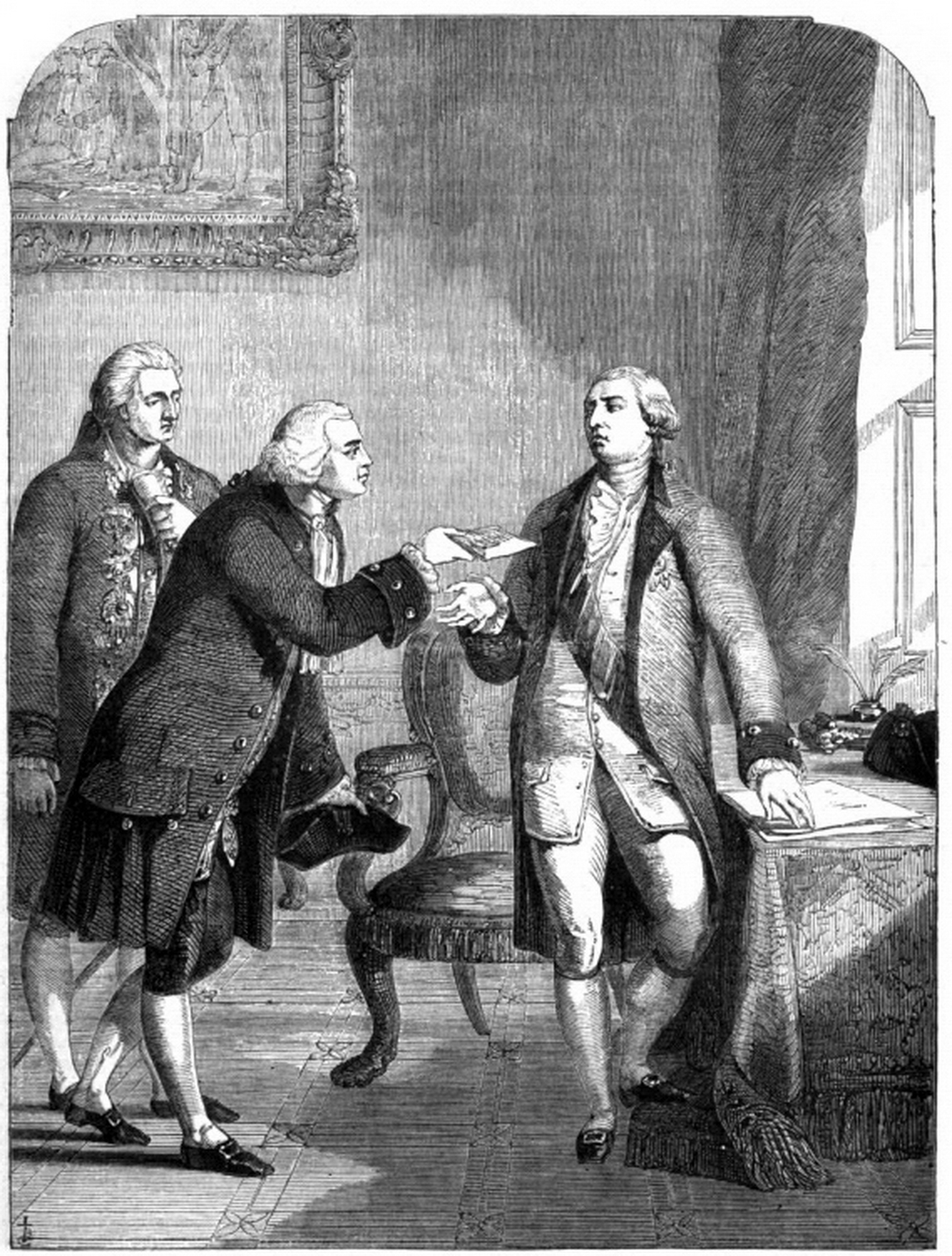
John Adams, the first American Plenipotentiary Minister to Great Britain being presented at the Court of St James's to King George III in 1785, as depicted in John Cassell's Illustrated History of England, Volume 5, 1865

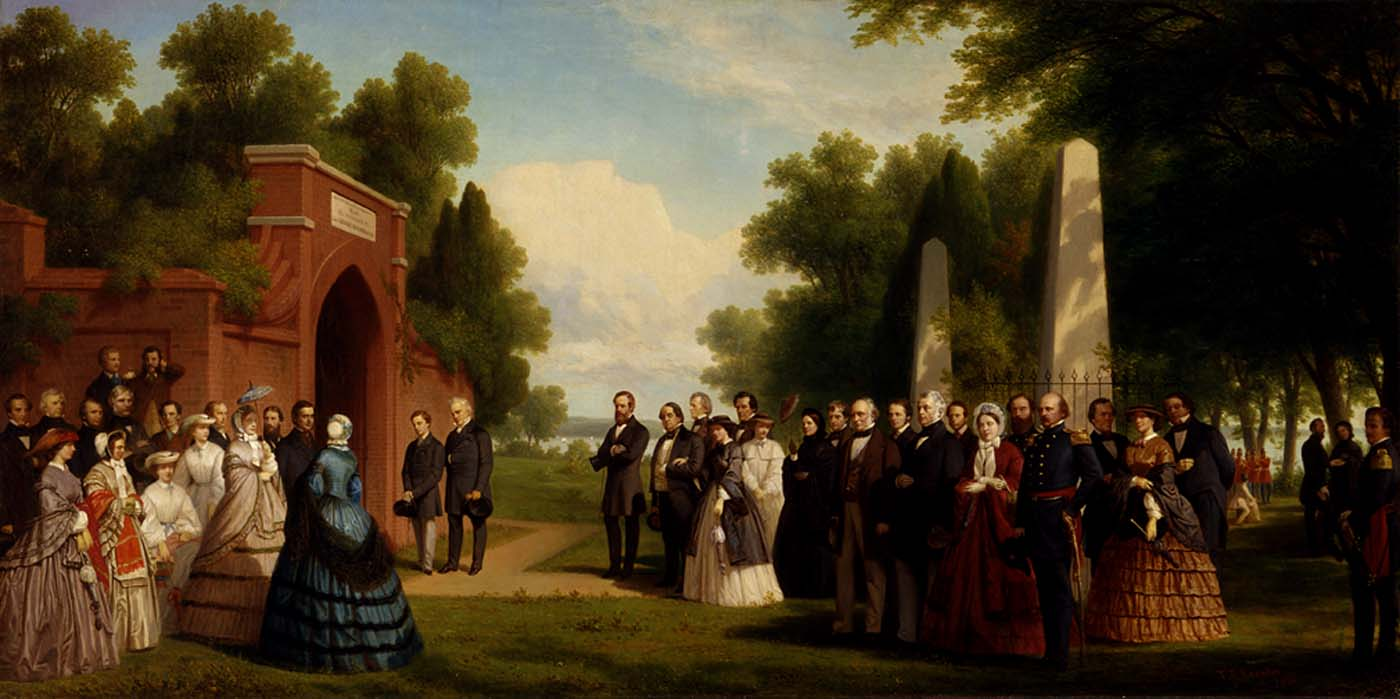
A visit to the tomb of George Washington at Mount Vernon by Edward, Prince of Wales, President James Buchanan, and other dignitaries in 1860, as depicted in an 1861 painting by American artist Thomas Prichard Rossiter

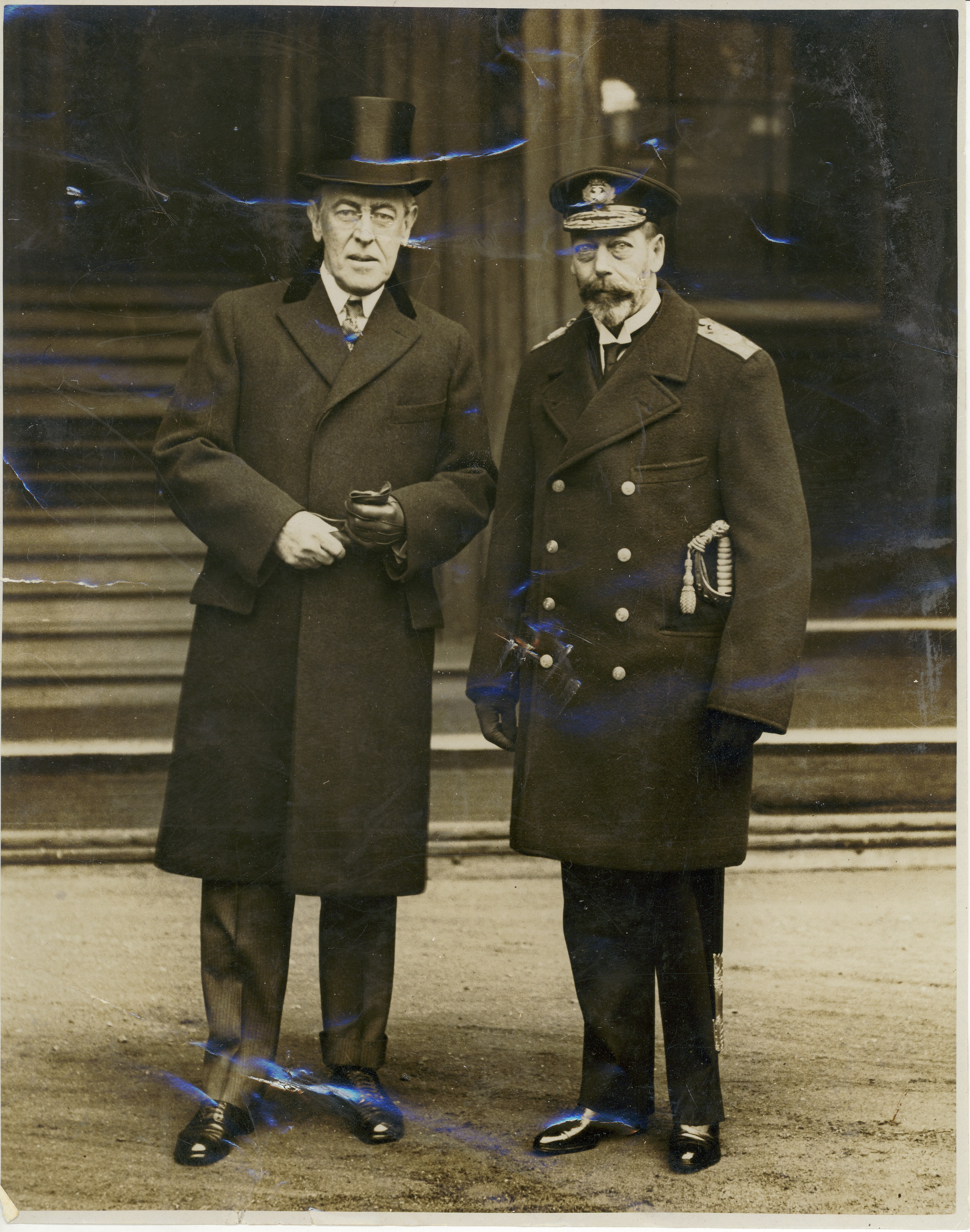
President Woodrow Wilson and King George V at Buckingham Palace, 1918

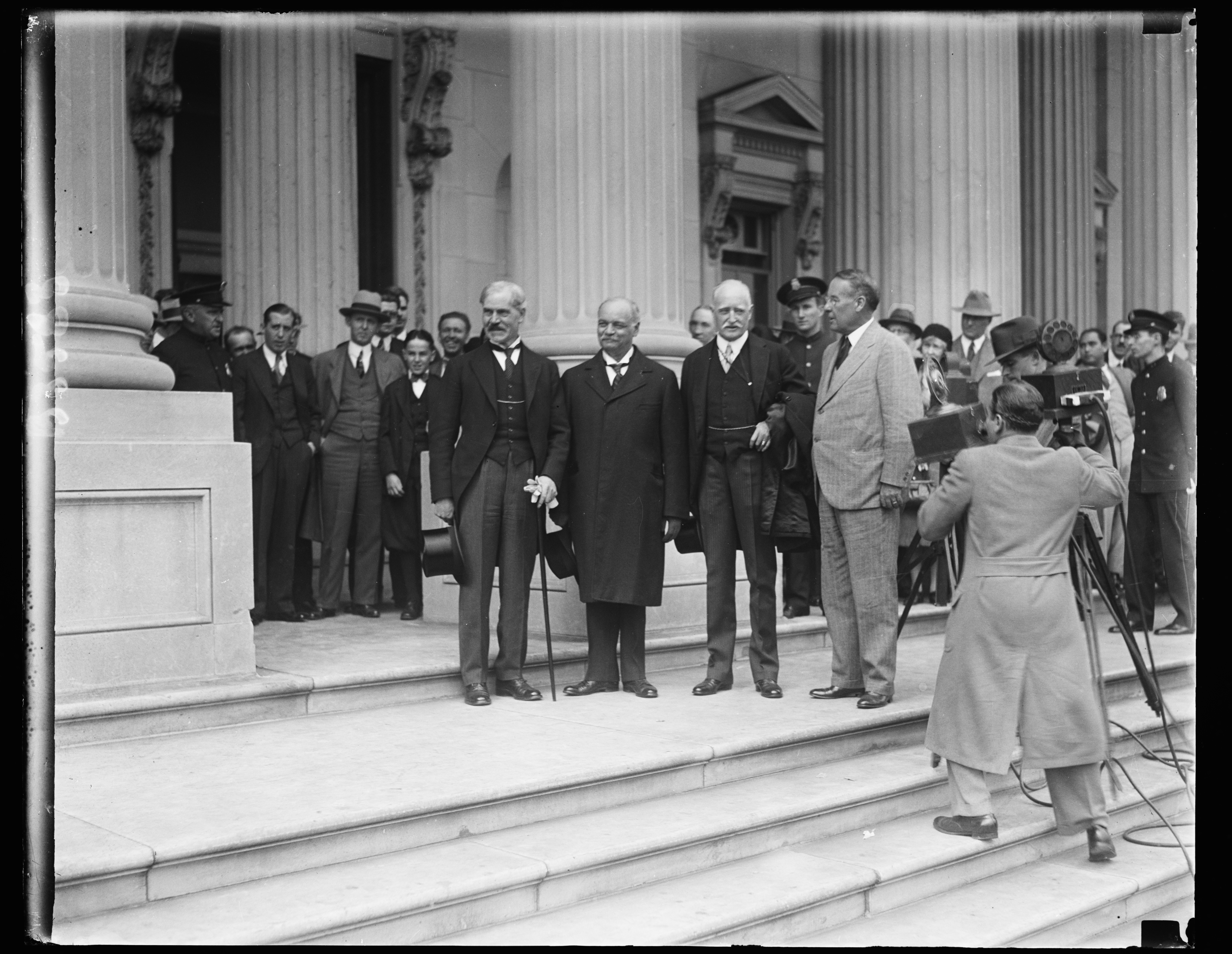
Prime Minister Ramsay Macdonald and British Ambassador Esmé Howard, 1st Baron Howard of Penrith greeted at the United States Capitol in Washington by Vice President Charles Curtis, 1929

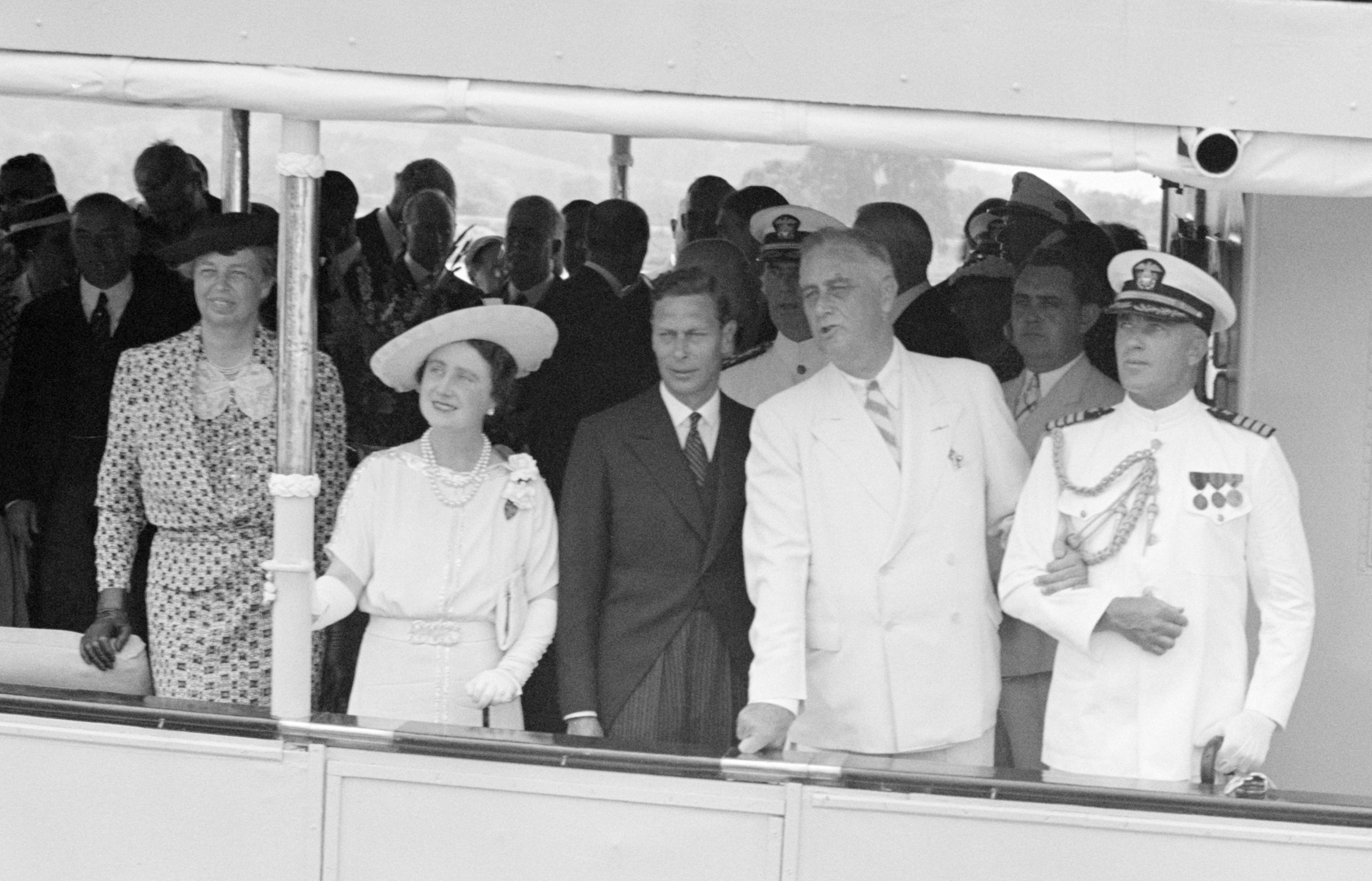
First Lady Eleanor Roosevelt, Queen Elizabeth, King George VI, President Franklin D. Roosevelt aboard the presidential yacht USS Potomac during Their Majesties state visit to Washington, 1939

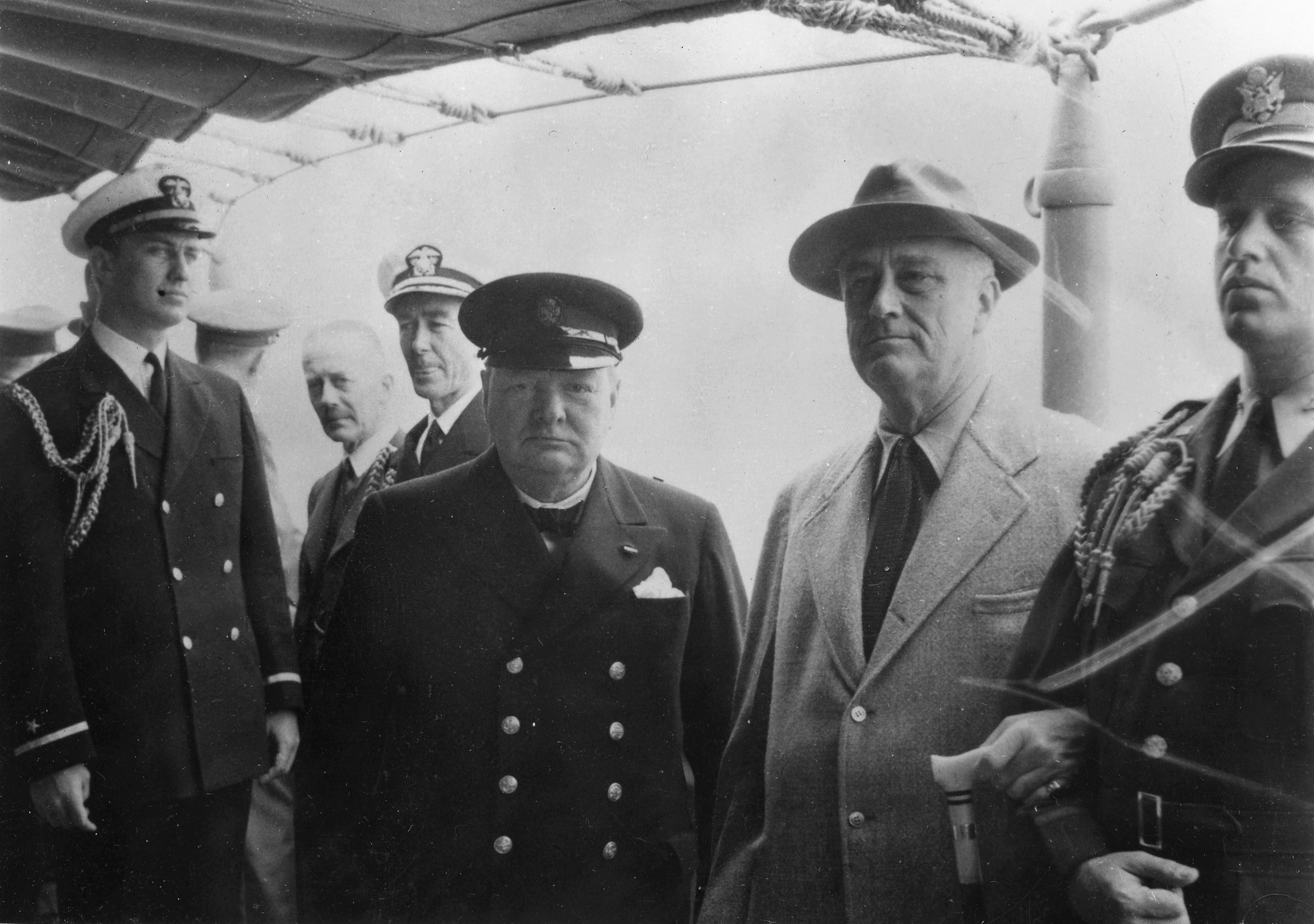
President Franklin D. Roosevelt and Prime Minister Winston Churchill aboard the USS Augusta after signing the Atlantic Charter, 1941

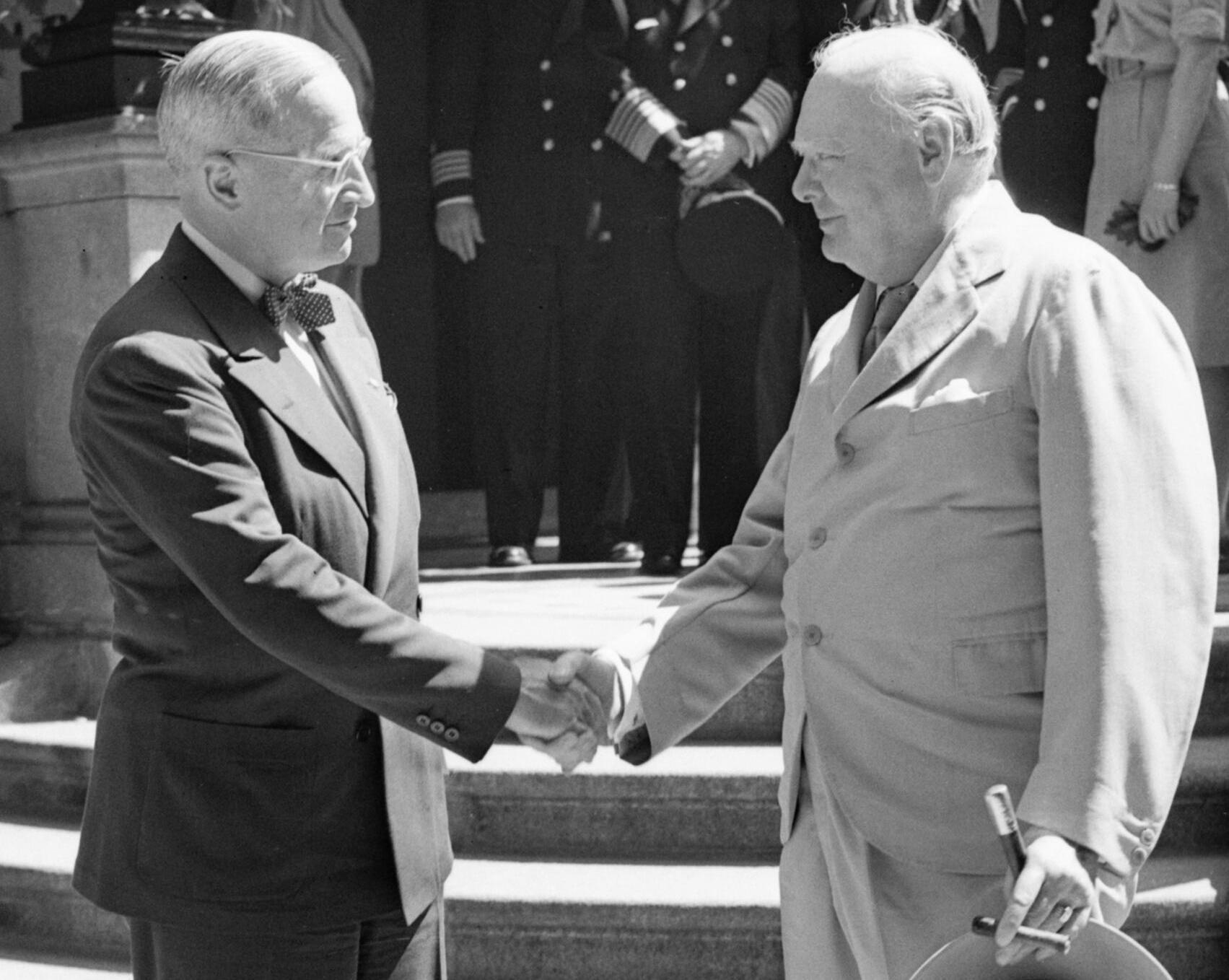
President Harry S. Truman and Prime Minister Winston Churchill shake hands during the Potsdam Conference, 1945

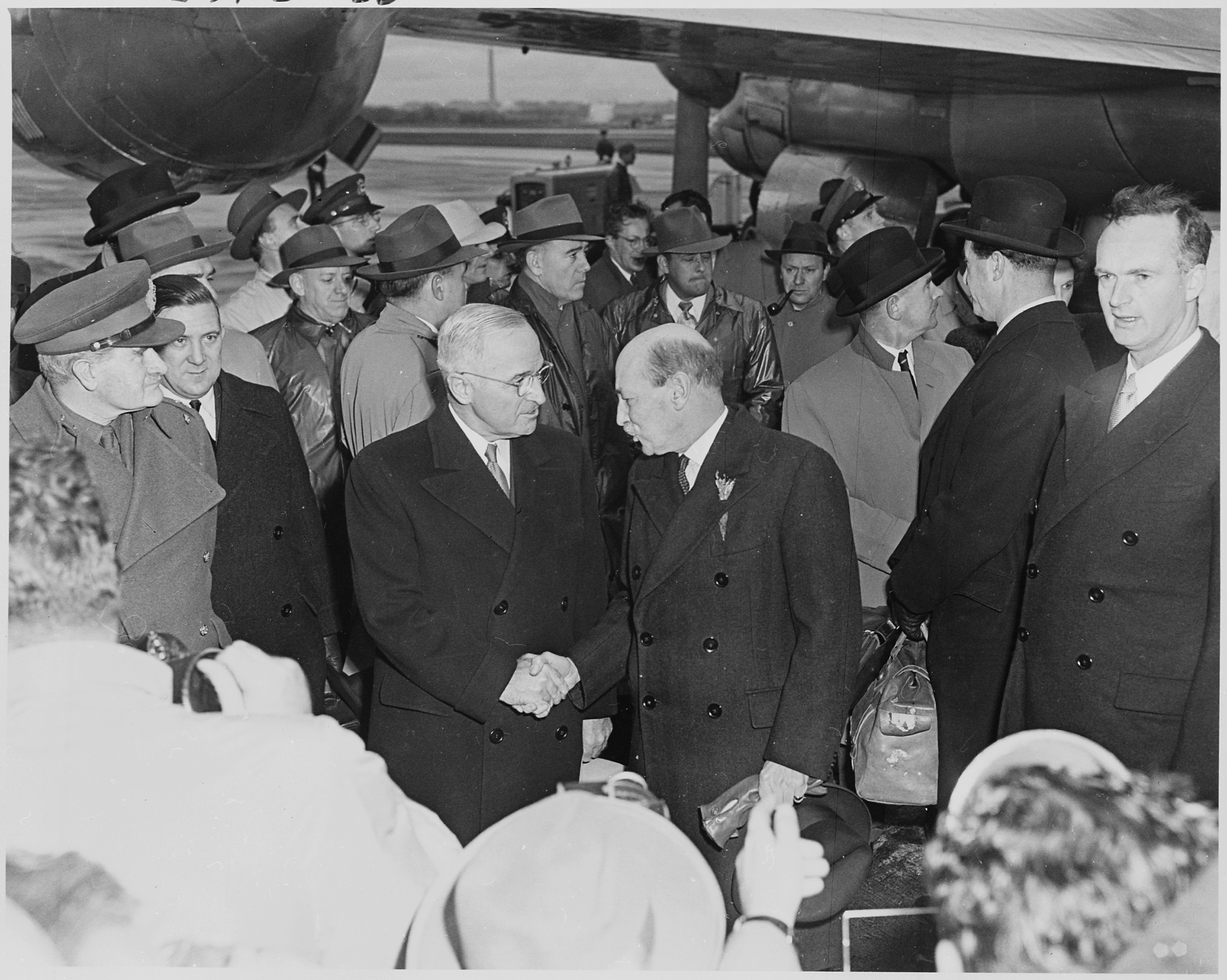
President Harry S. Truman shaking hands with Prime Minister Clement Attlee upon his arrival at Washington National Airport, 1950

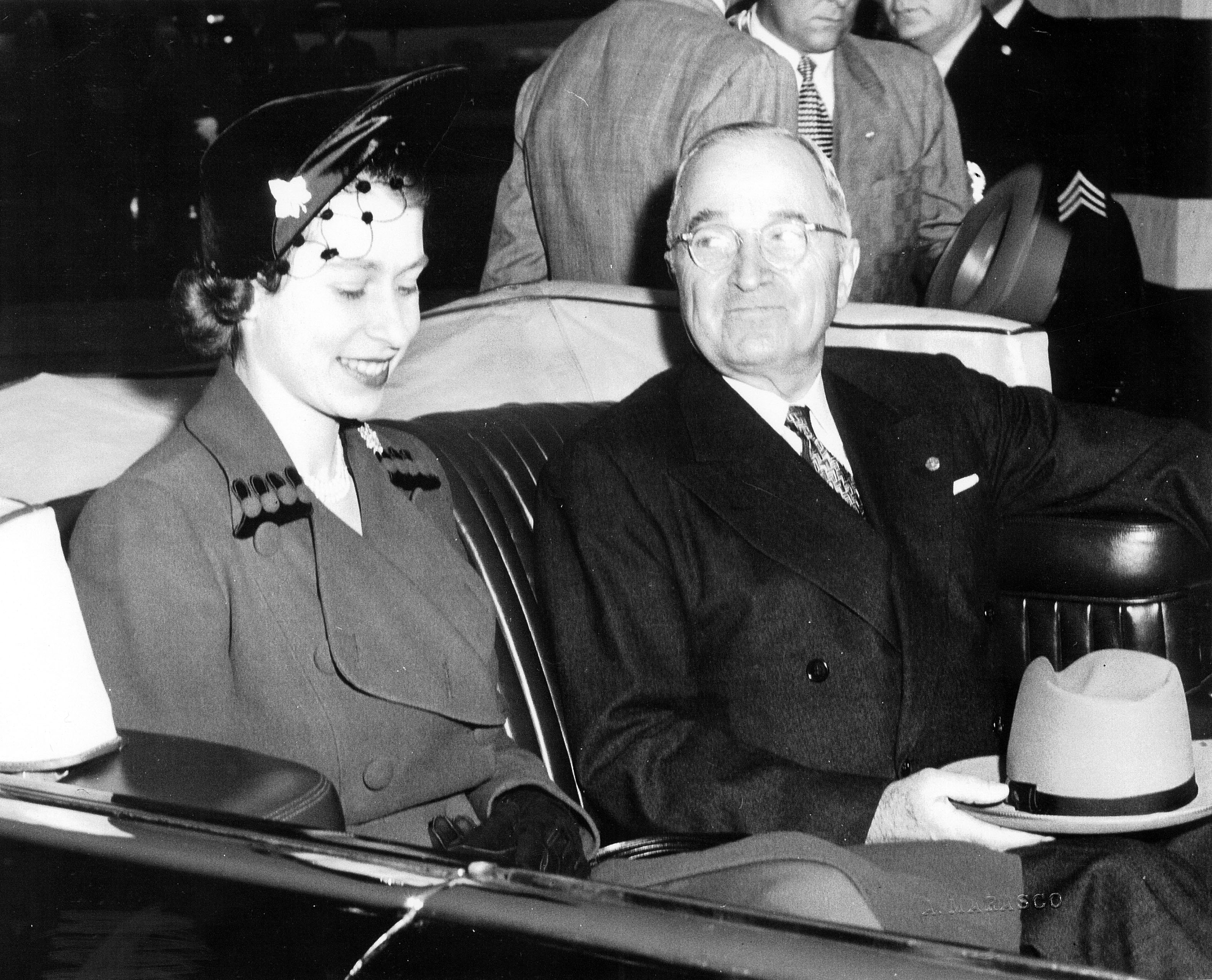
President Harry S. Truman and Princess Elizabeth, Duchess of Edinburgh in the presidential limousine en route to Blair House in Washington, 1951

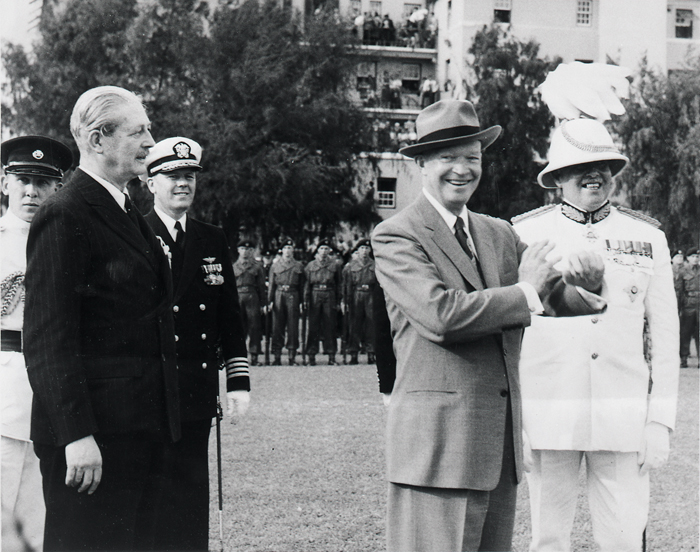
Prime Minister Harold Macmillan and President Dwight D. Eisenhower meet for talks in Bermuda during the aftermath of the Suez Crisis, 1957

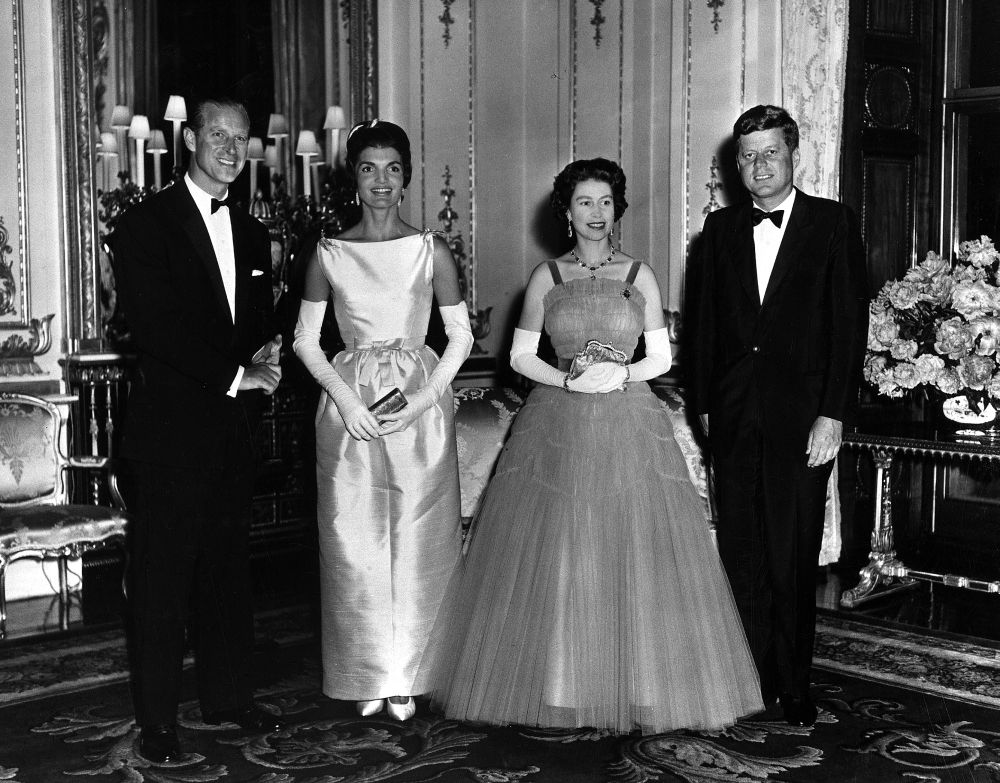
Queen Elizabeth II and Prince Philip, Duke of Edinburgh posing with President John F. Kennedy and First Lady Jacqueline Kennedy during a dinner held at Buckingham Palace for the visiting American delegation, 1961

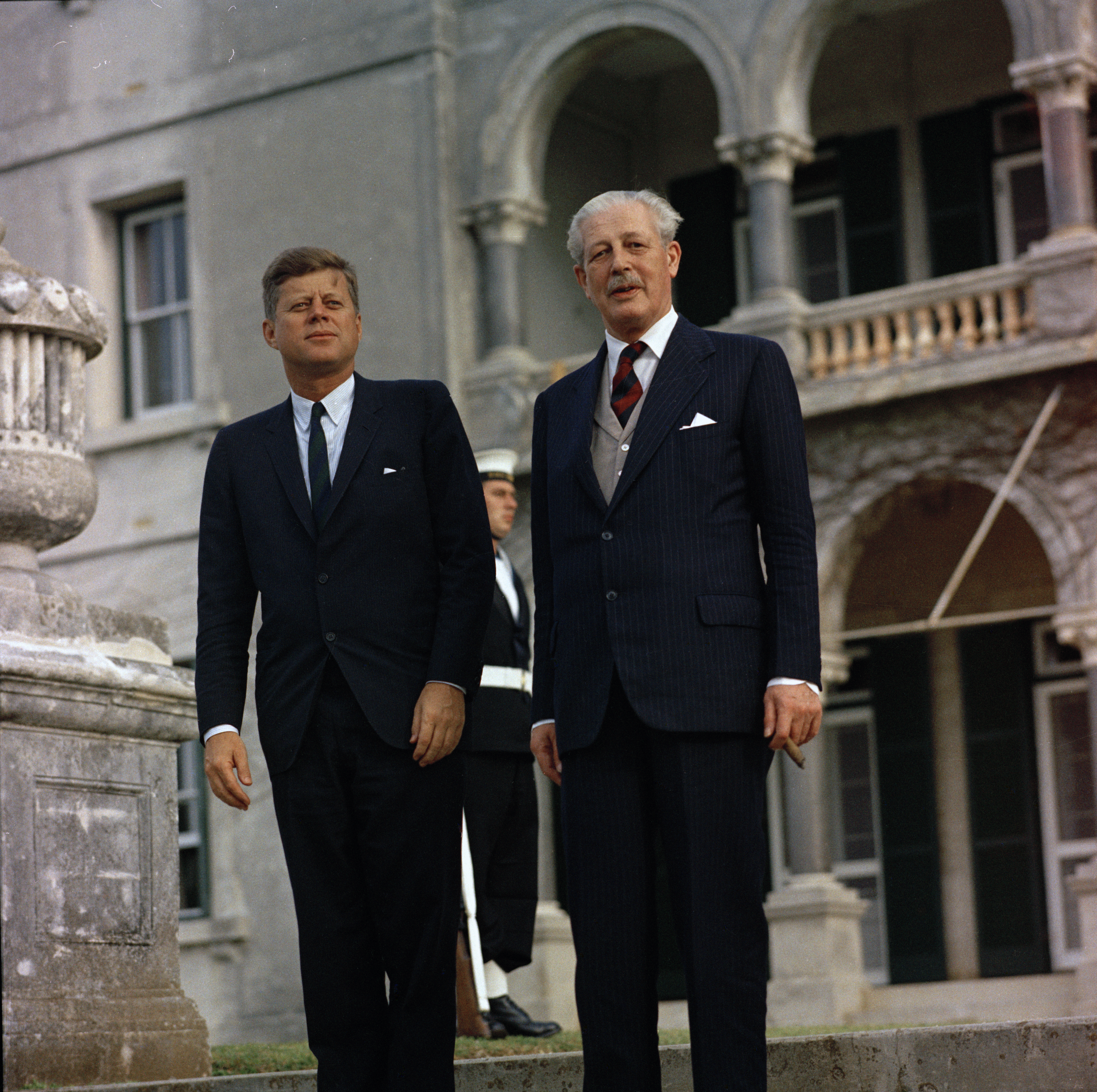
President John F. Kennedy and Prime Minister Harold Macmillan in Bermuda, 1961

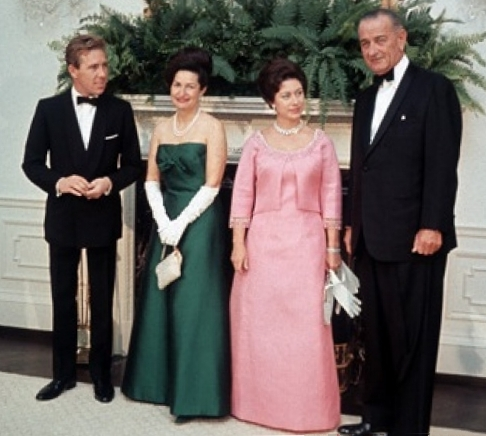
Antony Armstrong-Jones, 1st Earl of Snowdon, Lady Bird Johnson, Princess Margaret, Countess of Snowdon and President Lyndon B. Johnson at the White House, 1965

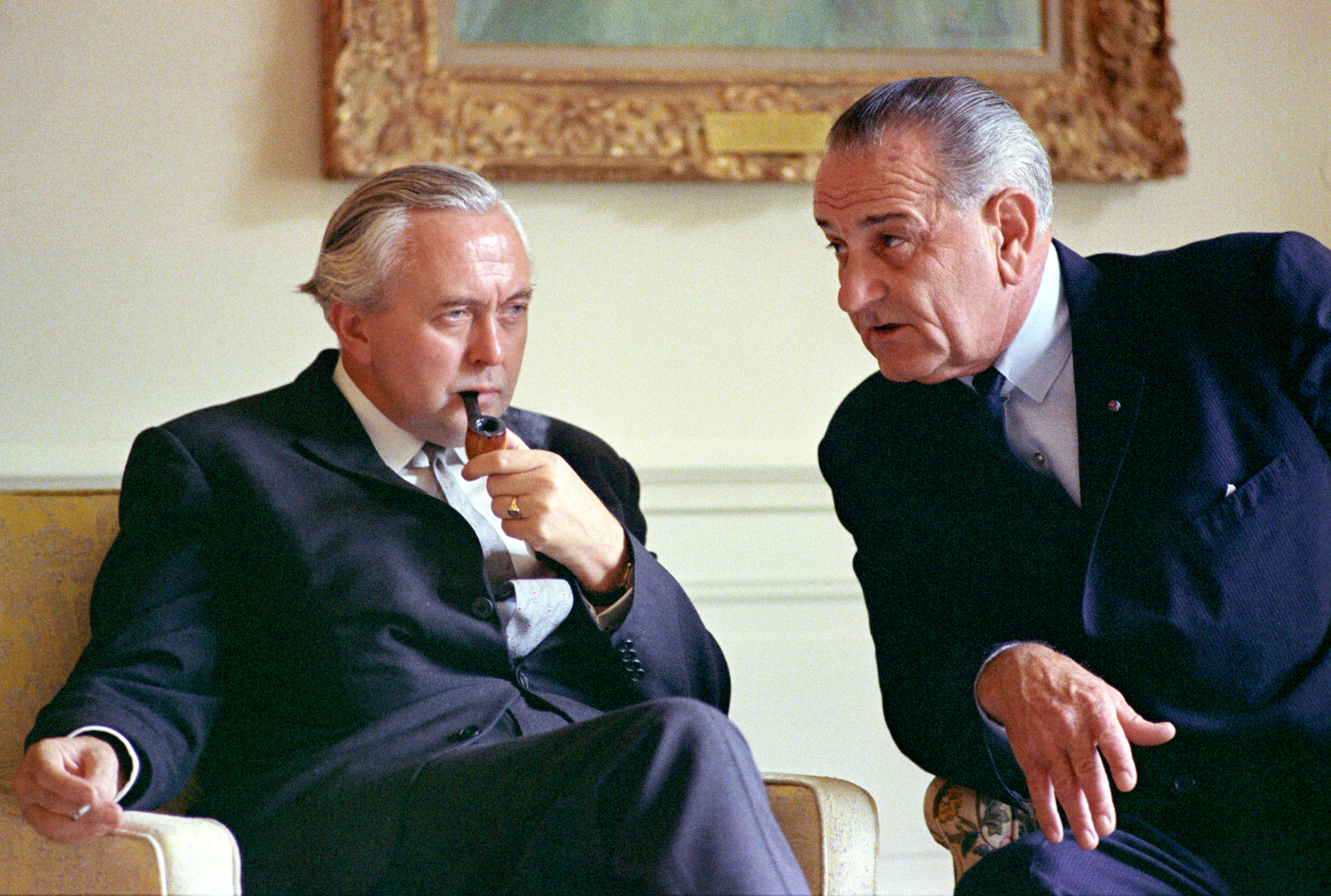
Prime Minister Harold Wilson and President Lyndon B. Johnson conversing at the White House, 1966

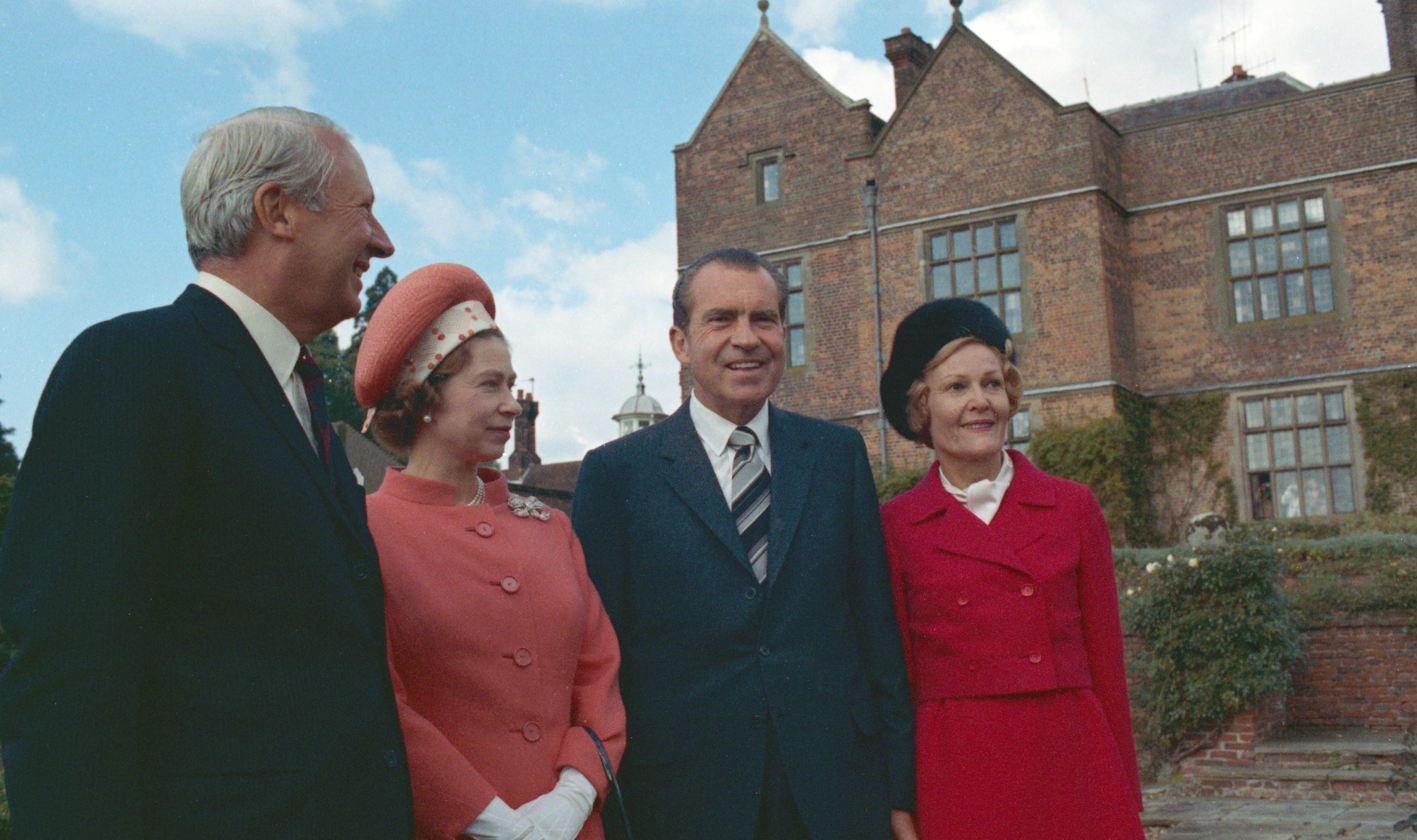
President Richard Nixon and First Lady Pat Nixon with Queen Elizabeth II and Prime Minister Edward Heath at Chequers, 1970

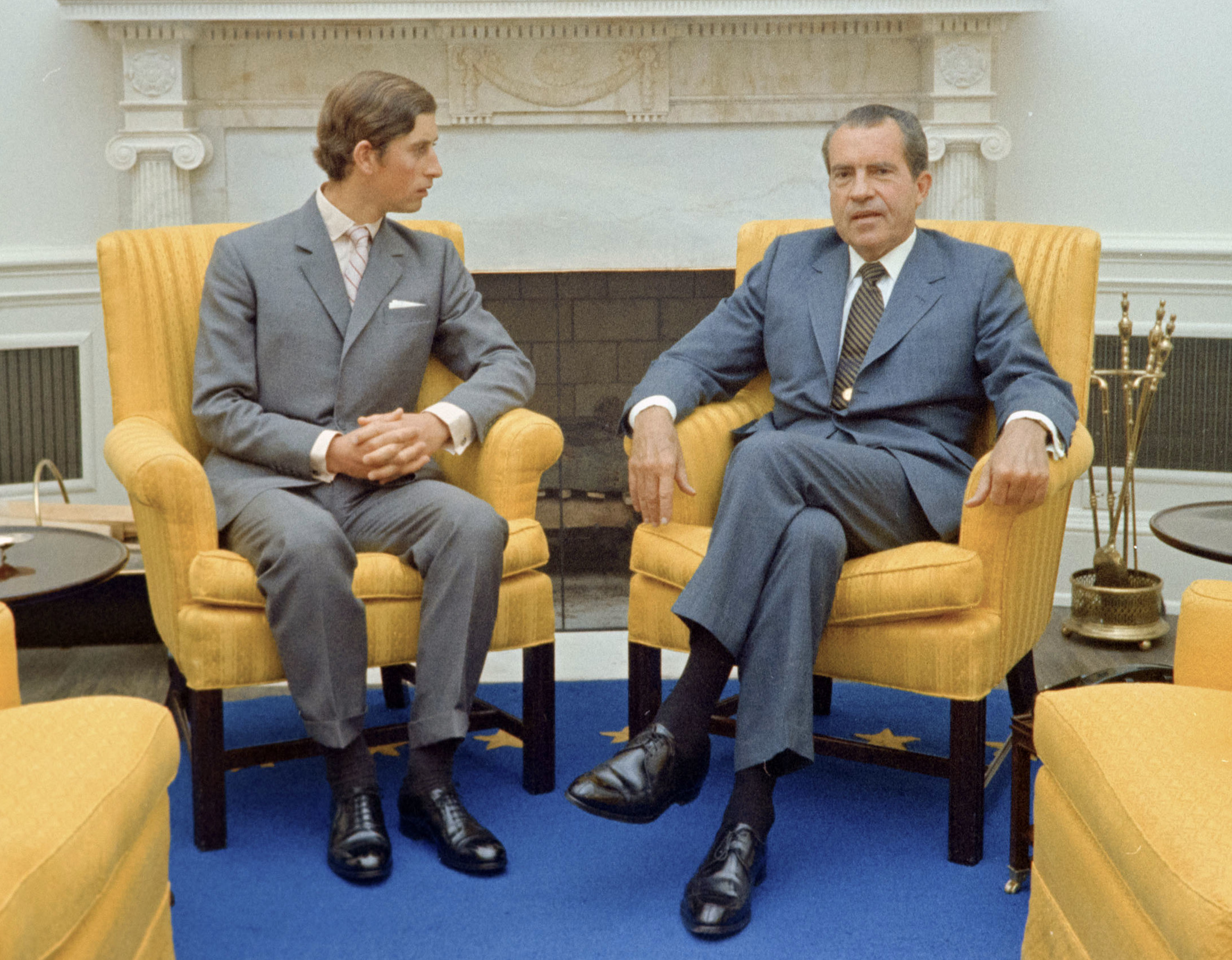
Charles, Prince of Wales meets with President Richard Nixon in the Oval Office, 1970

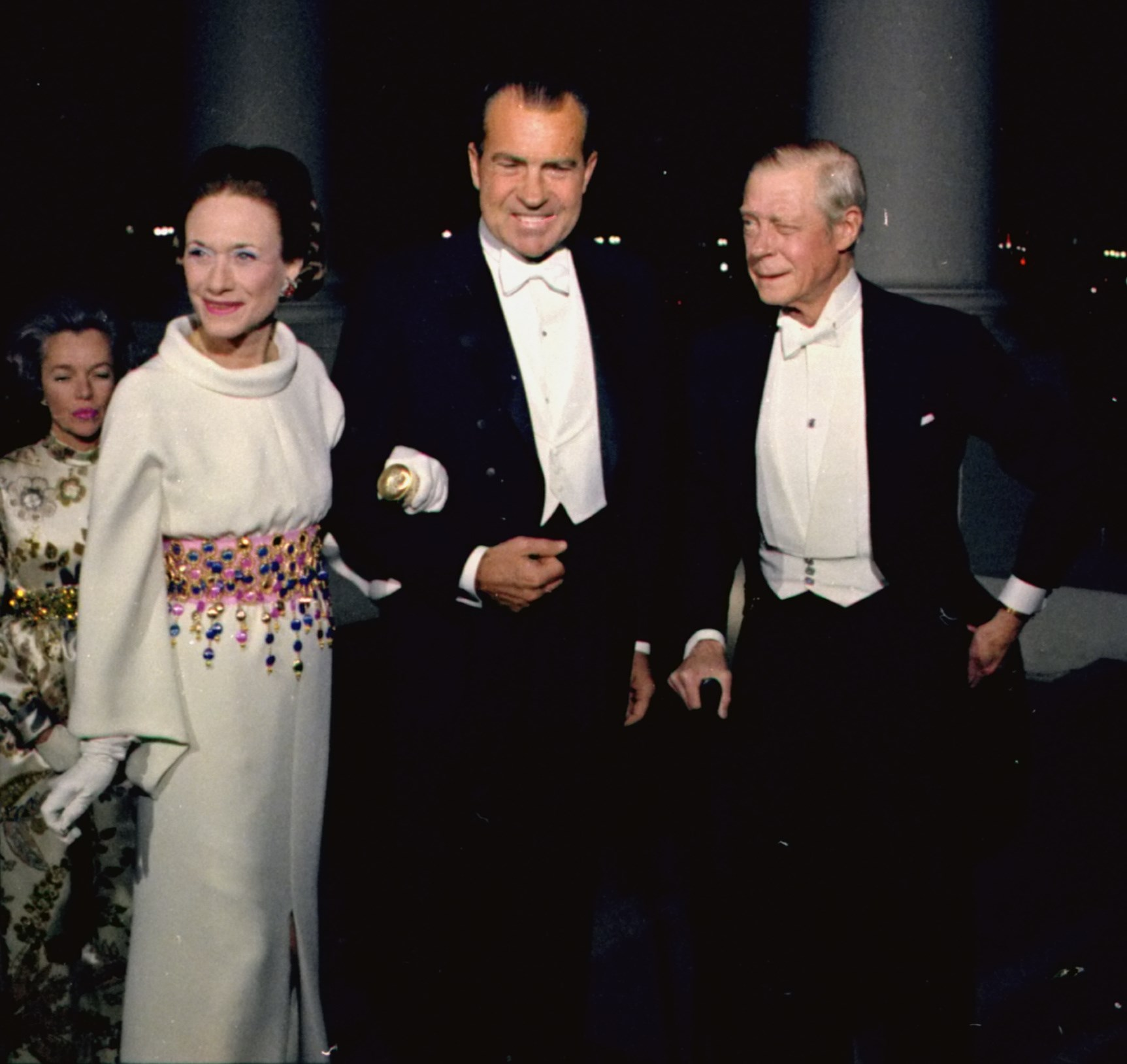
President Richard Nixon with Prince Edward, Duke of Windsor and Wallis, Duchess of Windsor, 1970

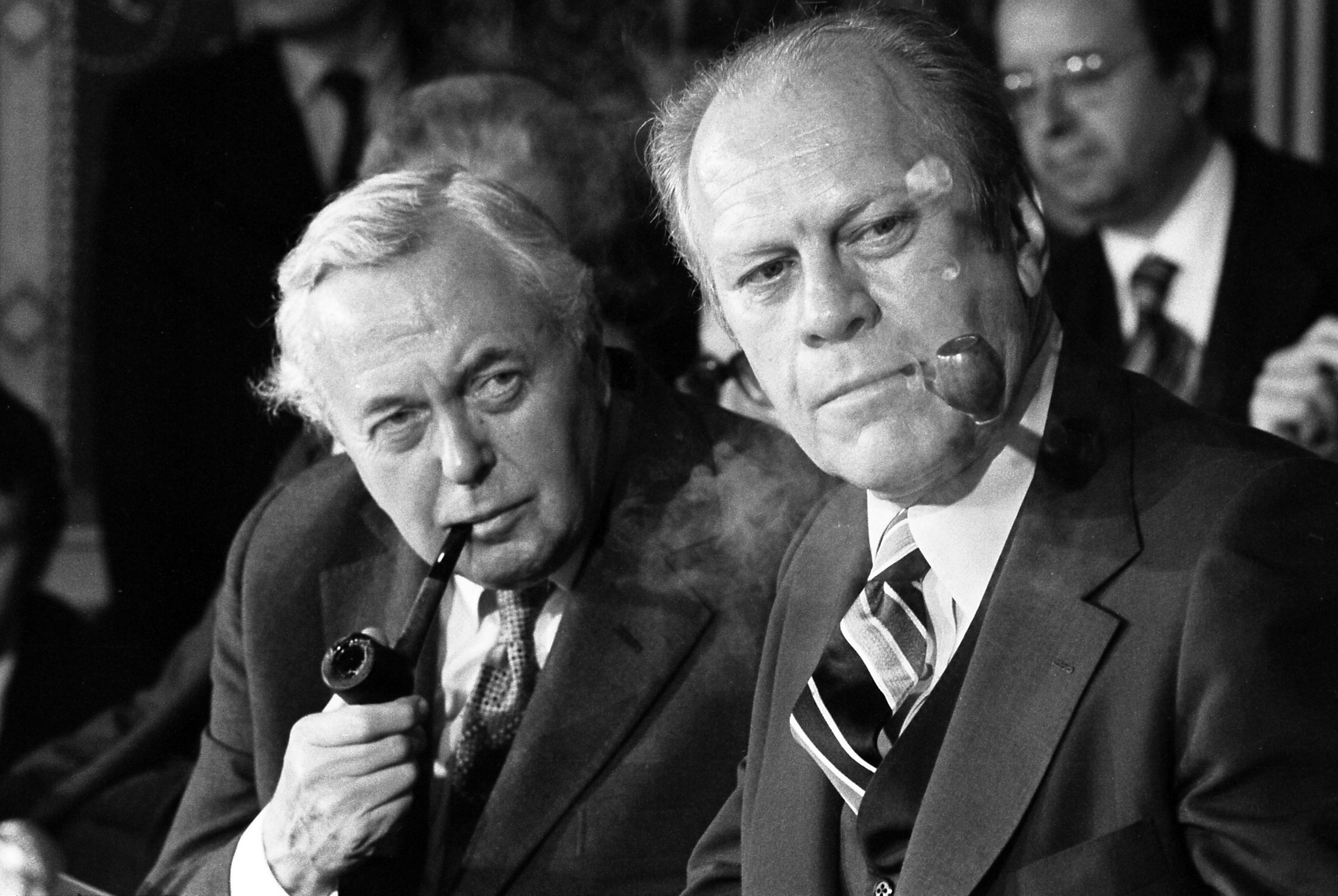
President Gerald Ford and Prime Minister Harold Wilson at the International Economic Summit in Rambouillet, France, 1975

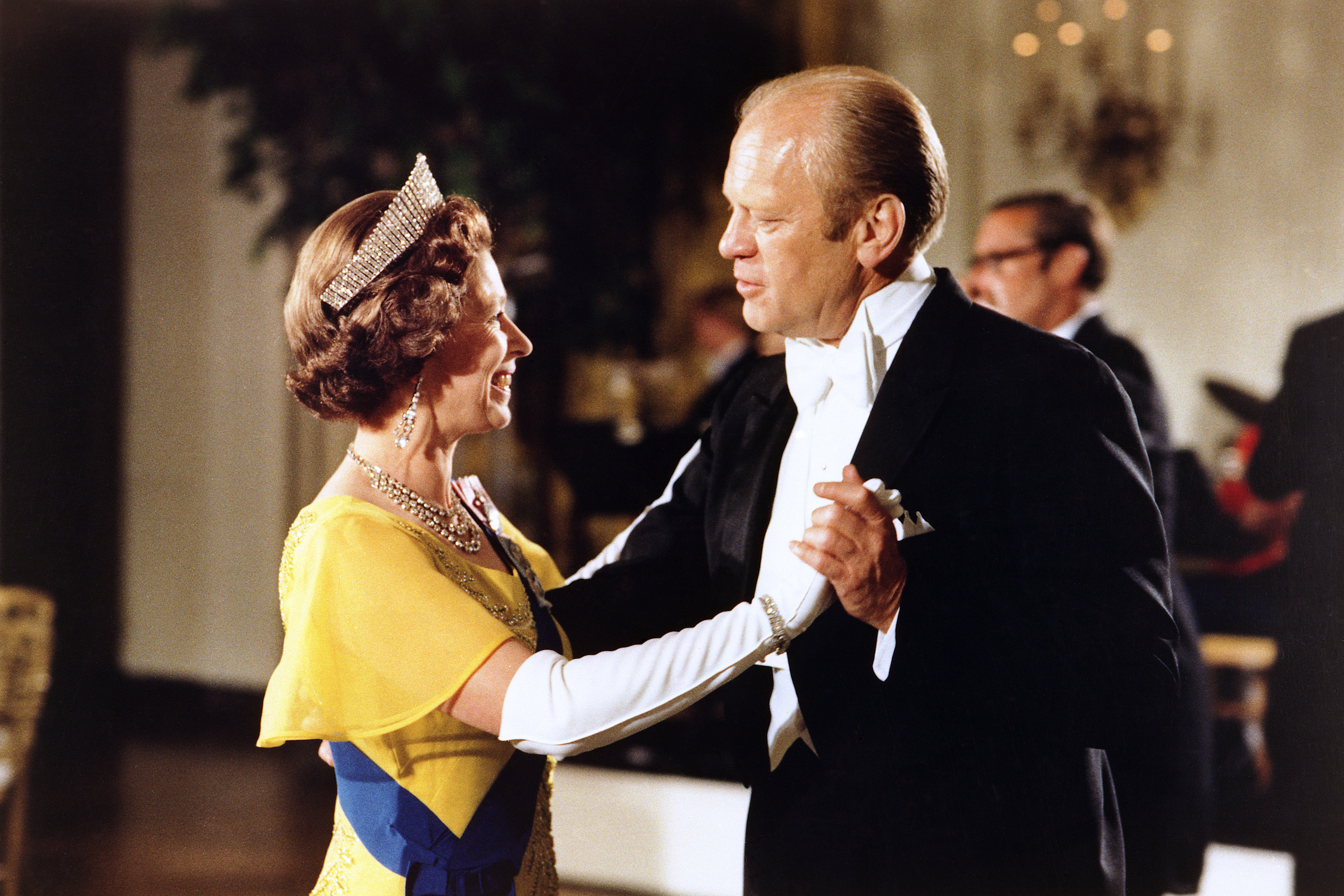
President Gerald Ford dancing with Queen Elizabeth II at the White House, 1976

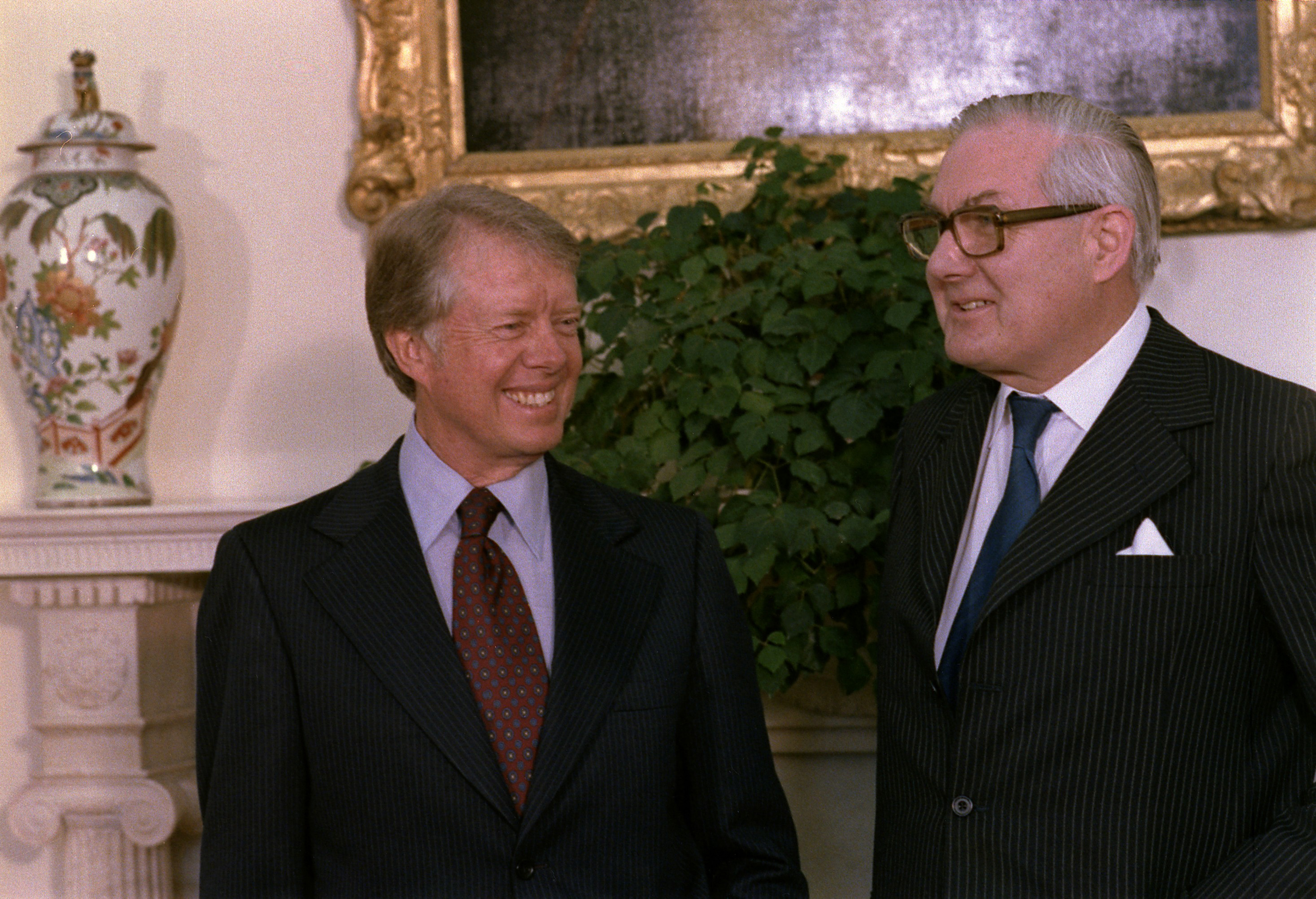
President Jimmy Carter and Prime Minister James Callaghan in the Oval Office, 1978

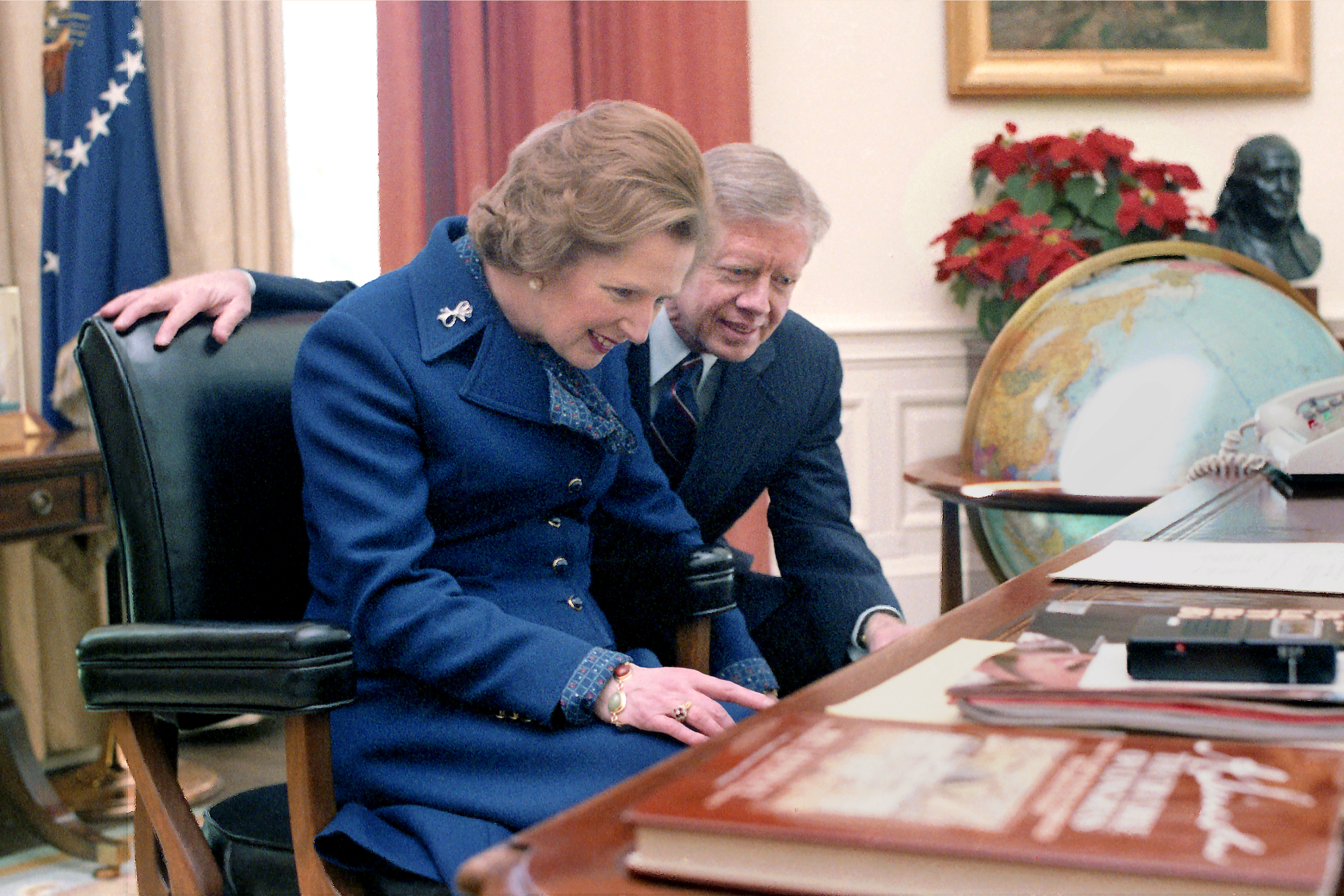
President Jimmy Carter and Prime Minister Margaret Thatcher at the Resolute desk in the Oval Office, 1979

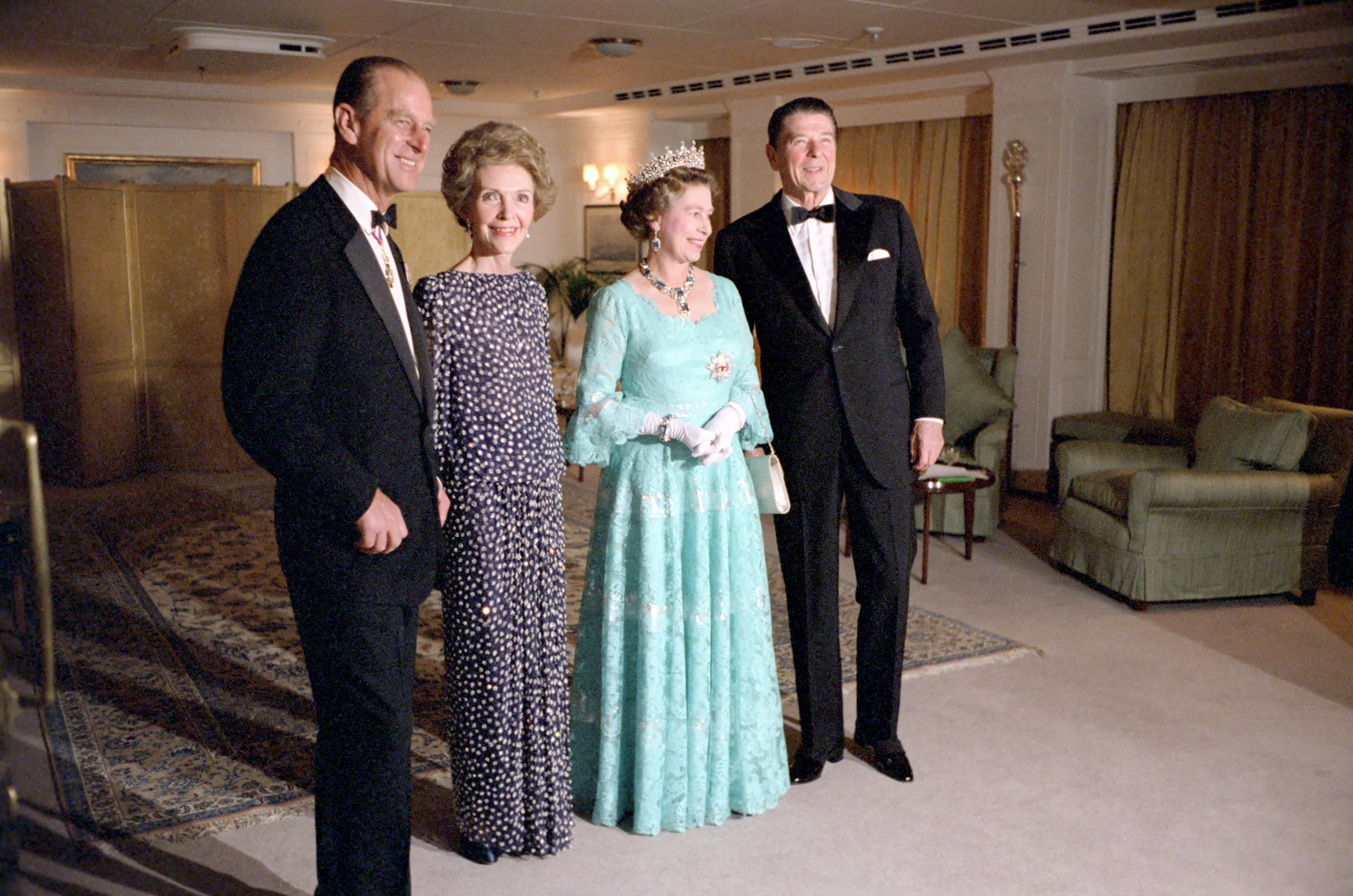
Prince Philip, Duke of Edinburgh, First Lady Nancy Reagan, Queen Elizabeth II and President Ronald Reagan aboard HMY Britannia, 1983

President Ronald Reagan and First Lady Nancy Reagan with Charles, Prince of Wales and Diana, Princess of Wales at the White House during the Waleses' official visit to the United States, 1985

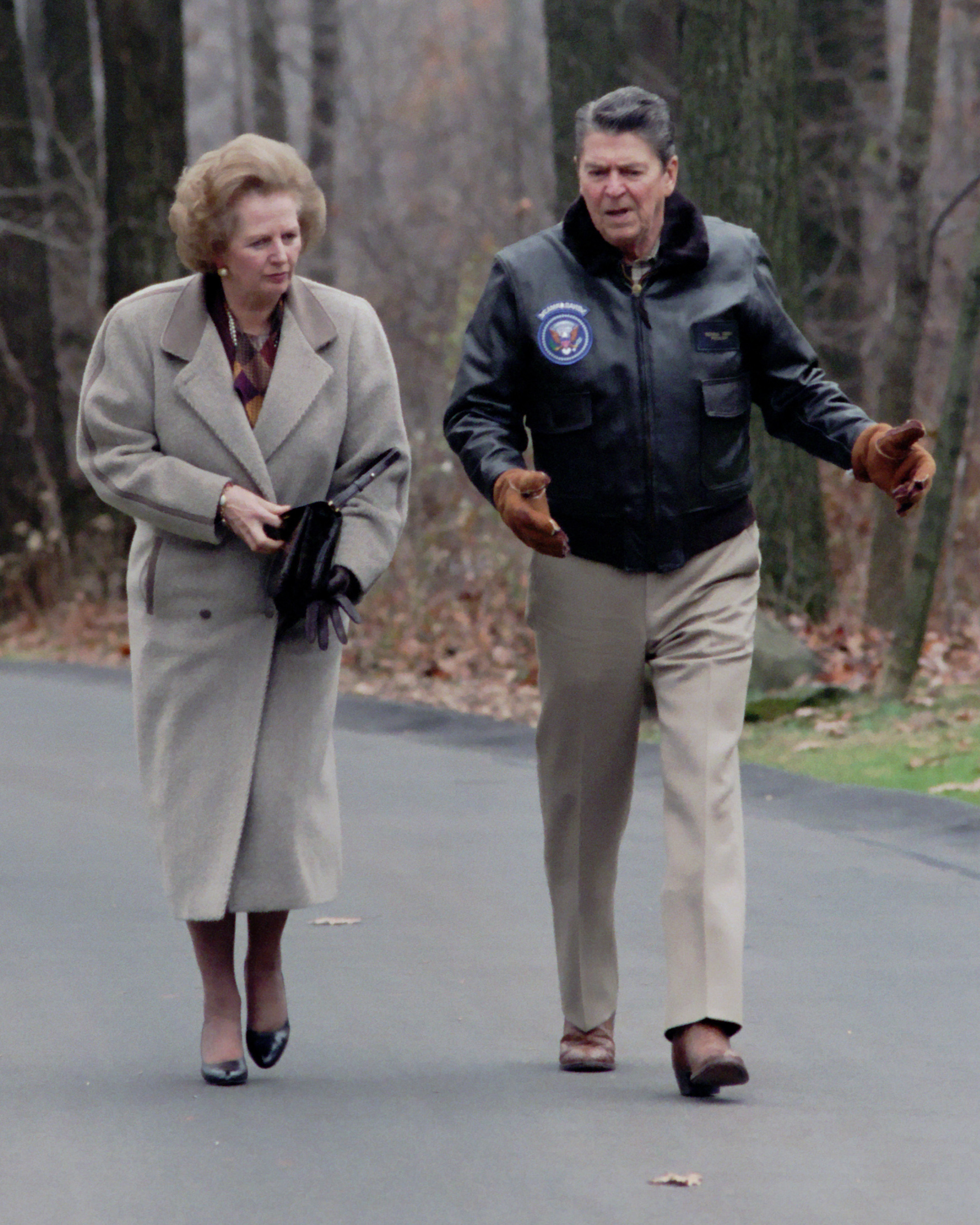
Prime Minister Margaret Thatcher and President Ronald Reagan in discussion during a walk at Camp David, 1986

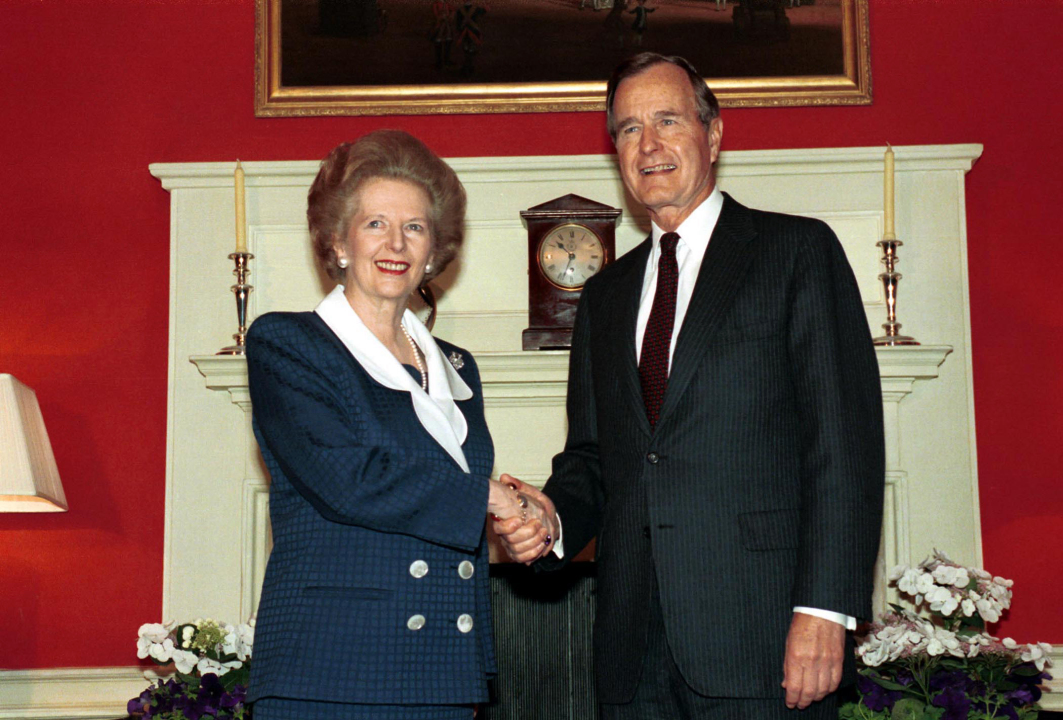
President George H. W. Bush and Prime Minister Margaret Thatcher in London, 1989
