= 31st General Assembly of Prince Edward Island =

The 31st General Assembly of Prince Edward Island was in session from March 27, 1890, to November 13, 1893. The Liberal Party led by Frederick Peters formed a government after the Conservatives lost their majority in the 1890 election.

There were four sessions of the 31st General Assembly:

Session	Start	End
1st	March 27, 1890	May 7, 1890
2nd	April 23, 1891	July 15, 1891
3rd	March 23, 1892	May 5, 1892
4th	March 8, 1893	April 20, 1893

Patrick Blake was elected speaker in 1890; after Blake resigned his seat in 1891, Bernard D. McLellan was chosen as speaker.

== Members ==
Electoral district	Member	Party	First elected / previously elected
1st Kings	John McLean	Conservative	1876, 1882
1st Kings	Alexander Robertson (1891)	Liberal	1891
1st Kings	James R. McLean	Liberal	1882
2nd Kings	J.P. Sullivan	Conservative	1890
2nd Kings	J.C. Underhay	Conservative	1879, 1886
3rd Kings	H.L. McDonald	Conservative	1886
3rd Kings	James E. MacDonald (1890)	Conservative	1890
3rd Kings	Cyrus Shaw	Conservative	1886
4th Kings	James Clow	Conservative	1890
4th Kings	Angus MacLeod	Liberal	1886
5th Kings	Daniel Gordon	Conservative	1876
5th Kings	Archibald J. MacDonald	Conservative	1873, 1879
1st Prince	John A. Matheson	Liberal	1882
1st Prince	Bernard D. McLellan	Liberal	1888
2nd Prince	John Yeo	Liberal	1873
2nd Prince	Alfred McWilliams (1891)	Liberal	1891
2nd Prince	James Richards	Conservative	1873
3rd Prince	J.M. Montgomery	Liberal	1890
3rd Prince	Joseph O. Arsenault	Conservative	1873
4th Prince	George W. Bentley	Conservative	1879
4th Prince	John H. Bell	Liberal	1886
5th Prince	Angus McMillan	Liberal	1876, 1890
5th Prince	David Rogers	Conservative	1890
1st Queens	James M. Sutherland	Conservative	1886
1st Queens	Alexander Bannerman Warburton (1891)	Liberal	1888 (Note: 4th Queens), 1891
1st Queens	Peter Sinclair	Conservative	1873, 1882
2nd Queens	Donald Farquharson	Liberal	1876
2nd Queens	Donald McKay	Conservative	1876, 1890
3rd Queens	Donald Ferguson	Conservative	1878
3rd Queens	J. H. Cummiskey (1891)	Liberal	1891
3rd Queens	Frederick Peters	Liberal	1890
4th Queens	George Forbes	Liberal	1886
4th Queens	Hector C. McDonald	Liberal	1890
5th Queens	Neil McLeod	Conservative	1879
5th Queens	Patrick Blake	Conservative	1882
5th Queens	John Theophilus Jenkins (1891)	Conservative	1891
