= Neil McLeod (politician) =

Canadian politician (1842–1915)

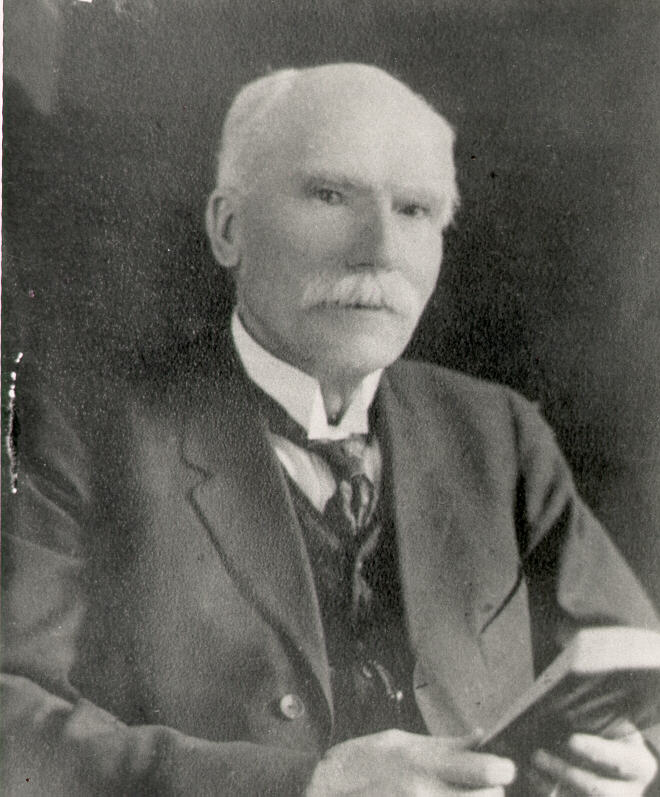

5th Premier of Prince Edward Island
- In office November 13, 1889 – April 27, 1891
- Monarch: Victoria
- Lieutenant Governor: Jedediah Slason Carvell
- Preceded by: William Wilfred Sullivan
- Succeeded by: Frederick Peters

Leader of the Conservative Party of Prince Edward Island
- In office November 1, 1889 – March 9, 1893
- Preceded by: William Wilfred Sullivan
- Succeeded by: Daniel Gordon

Member of the General Assembly of Prince Edward Island for 5th Queens
- In office April 2, 1879 – December 13, 1893 Serving with George W. Deblois, Patrick Blake, John T. Jenkins
- Preceded by: Louis Henry Davies
- Succeeded by: district abolished

Personal details
- Born: December 15, 1842 Uigg, Prince Edward Island
- Died: October 19, 1915 (aged 72) Summerside, Prince Edward Island
- Party: Conservative
- Spouse: Isabella Jane Adelia Hayden (m. 1877)
- Children: 7
- Education: Acadia University
- Occupation: Lawyer and judge
- Profession: Politician
- Cabinet: Secretary-Treasurer (1879–1887); Minister without Portfolio (1887–1889)

Neil McLeod (December 15, 1842 – October 19, 1915) was a Prince Edward Island lawyer, judge, politician, the fifth premier, and Leader of the Opposition during the amalgamation of the Prince Edward Island legislature. He was born at Uigg on the island to Roderick McLeod and Flora McDonald, Baptist immigrants from the Isle of Skye in Scotland. He was educated at the Uigg Grammar School and in Wolfville, Nova Scotia, articled in law at Charlottetown and was called to the bar in 1873. Four years later, his marriage to the beloved Isabella Jane Adelia Hayden, the Methodist granddaughter to Irish Roman Catholic immigrant and merchant John Roach Bourke, furthered Gaelic intersections among Islander cultural enclaves. McLeod was the child of immigrants from the Isle of Skye. Between 1886-1893, transcriptions by parliamentary reporters and petition amanuenses identified him as both "Neil McLeod" and "Neil MacLeod." Reporters included his 5th Queens (Charlottetown Common) district next to his name in order to distinguish him from Angus MacLeod. Charlottetown dailies that reproduced passages from the transcriptions also replicated the spelling variation during this period. Historians continue to research his positions on the 1882 replacement of French-language texts with bilingual readers for French Acadians, late nineteenth-century prohibitions on Canadian Gaelic, and corporal punishment in Prince Edward Island schools.

Neil McLeod practiced law with partner Edward Jarvis Hodgson before joining the McLeod, Morson, and McQuarrie law firm. He also served as Commissioner for the Poor House and as a "trustee" to the public Prince Edward Island Hospital for the Insane, which replaced the Lunatic Asylum following a Grand Jury inquest. In 2019, mental health officer and occupational therapist Tina Pranger examined the presents and pasts of the Hillsborough Hospital, providing a summation of previous assessments of the inquest by historians and curators.

== Prince Edward Island Conservative Party Leader and Premier ==
Neil McLeod entered partisan politics in 1879, winning a seat in the provincial legislature as a Conservative. He was re-elected in 1882 and, after the resignation of the Davies government, became secretary-treasurer and then minister without portfolio in the William Wilfred Sullivan majority government. Sullivan, a Roman Catholic Premier, switched to the Conservative Party when Liberals diminished public funding for "minority faith" (e.g., Roman Catholic) separate schools in the 1877 Public Schools Act. During the electoral campaigns, McLeod garnered endorsements from labor organizations by promoting a Mechanics’ Lien Bill, which passed in the legislature, along with an indigent debtors bill and regulations that circumscribed punitive measures for debt. In 1889, Sullivan resigned to become Chief Justice of the province's Supreme Court and McLeod became party leader and Premier. He supported construction of a mainland tunnel and liquor licensing laws after the defeat of provincial temperance legislation. McLeod, along with several prominent Liberal delegates, seemed to advocate for "temperance" textbooks at reduced prices. His government, a majority by only one delegate, faced three by-election losses in 1891 after three members resigned to pursue seats in the House of Commons of Canada.

On April 17, 1891, Neil McLeod's Cabinet (Executive Council) requested dissolution in order to facilitate deliberations over deficit spending and what became known as legislative "amalgamation." Despite a refusal by Lieutenant Governor Jedediah Slason Carvell, reports of a pending Motion of No Confidence compelled McLeod to tender his resignation by telephone the day before the next legislature session. He thereafter carried the dubious distinction of being the first elected official in the Canadian Confederation, and what would become the Commonwealth of Nations, to resign a government with a brief phone call.

== Unicameralism and Leader of the Opposition ==
From 1891 to 1893, Neil McLeod became Leader of the Opposition in the 31st General Assembly of Prince Edward Island. The Liberal Party denounced Conservative deficits, merchant metropolitics (they did not denounce a cosmopolis), attempts to construct a mainland tunnel, Land office mortgages, and preferences for Confederation "dominion" in United States trade treaties rather than Prince Edward Island "provincial reciprocity" with the U.S. federal government. On the eve of the Great Rapprochement, U.S. Democratic partisan appropriation of "free trade" Cobdenism sustained British textile-industrial imports, which British merchants exchanged for U.S. sharecropped exports and manufactures.

The provincial Liberal Party cast "provincial reciprocity" as a pathway to U.S. industrial distribution of Prince Edward Island beef, lamb, and dairy exports to Atlantic markets as well as an import channel for a variety of commodities. These ostensible aims for "provincial reciprocity", which diverged from McKinley Tariff "reciprocity" ideas, garnered the support of agrarian proprietors and oyster mussel mud diggers implicated in soil treatments that in turn altered estuary and provincial ecologies. Conversely, "poor farmers" frequently sold portions of their herds to agrarian proprietors during winter hay shortages throughout the "amalgamation" critical period. The 1892 "Bill respecting the Legislature" allowed agrarian proprietors and mortgage-holders to vote for the proposed legislature in toto, but restricted suffrage for remaining tenant farmers, horticulturalists, shepherds, and usufructuary yeomen to voting for fifteen out of thirty MLAs. The latter's partisan politics remain subjects of scholarly inquiry. Fishermen votes for either party were often contingent on seasonal yields and majority governments, particularly during the storms that plagued the industry at the beginning of Isaac C. Hall's 1890-93 stint as U.S. Consul.

As Leader of the Opposition, Neil McLeod's dialectics engaged scathing Liberal critique with Conservative support for progressive "amalgamation" of the lower house and Legislative Council. These "amalgamation" debates adumbrated the fall and rise of competing notions of unicameralism across Island publics and, ultimately, a Legislative Assembly. Factionalism engulfed the French Acadian community, Roman Catholic parishes, and the usufructuary Lennox Island 1, Morell 2, and Scotchfort 4 reserves, under Dominion and Crown jurisdiction, for the Mi'kmaq of Lennox Island...on and off said reserves (the two Abegweit First Nation reserves seceded from the Lennox Island First Nation in 1972). Although the Roman Catholic Church never established, and the Dominion never appropriated, Indian Residential Schools on Prince Edward Island, scholarly research endeavors are currently underway to determine if any children of the twentieth-century P.E.I. First Nations were transported to the 1930-67 Shubenacadie Indian Residential School in Nova Scotia.

"African" men and women similarly did not appear in voting records and only between 165-181 identified as such in the 1881 census (with a precipitous decline in the 1891 census). Most lived and died in the "Bog" community of the Charlottetown electoral district represented by Neil McLeod, ensuring that the obfuscation of Afro-Euramerican offspring and proactive passive citizenship heralded unicameral ideas. In 1892, amidst deliberations over the "Bill respecting the Legislature" (popularly known as the "Amalgamation Bill"), McLeod attempted to extend provincial suffrage to unmarried, but not married, women. For Mi'kmaq and "African" peoples, as well as women, the legalities of parenthood, guardianship, consent, suffrage, and majority government became entangled in debates over hyperdescent.

This Opposition inaugurated a critical period in Prince Edward Island history, as passive and active Islander partisans narrated as well as contested origins for the idea of legislative "amalgamation." The emphasis on origins, however, failed to deter Neil McLeod from narrating the multipolar transmission of unicameral ideas into the "little" province and its multiple publics. Early in the third session of the 31st General Assembly of Prince Edward Island, for example, McLeod reassured the House that he would "wait with patience until the measure [for legislative "amalgamation"] is brought forth. If it is a reasonable one the Opposition will support it." Even during the first weeks of the session, McLeod recollected that Conservative partisans "have believed for years that the Legislature was too cumbersome, and we have made efforts to reduce it. We considered that one chamber was amply sufficient. When the great Province of Ontario can get along as well as they do with but one chamber, I do not see why the little Province of Prince Edward Island could not do the same." In his assessment, any dissent against unicameralism came from Liberal Party quarters. Alexander Warburton, for instance, repeatedly made clear that "he was opposed to doing away with one chamber, that two chambers were necessary for the safety of the country...he thinks that owing to the stringency of affairs in this country, perhaps it would be advisable." For "Clear Grit" unicameral ideas in Ontario, McLeod suggested that Warburton, Director of the Prince Edward Island Patriot Publishing Company, consult Toronto "editorials in the Globe newspaper [which] might induce him to do with one chamber. That paper advocates one chamber only."

Neil Mcleod also compared and contrasted Prince Edward Island "amalgamation" with unicameralism in Manitoba (1876) and New Brunswick (1891). These comparisons frequently ended with exhortations on the Clear Grit movement (including George Brown) and provincial unicameralism, rather than reifications of the 1791 Constitutional Act and the establishment of Upper Canada as a signal event in the inexorable path to Confederation. Dominion magistrates, journalists, poets, and authors promulgated such origin narratives of Confederation in the late nineteenth century. The entwinement of the memory of provincial unicameralism with Confederation narratives remains a subject of scholarly inquiry.

McLeod often recounted the origins of "amalgamation" as a prelude to "universal" suffrage, premised on hyperdescent across all provincial electoral districts. He introduced an example of this category of "amalgamation" narrative during a heated debate over a minority government ad hoc committee proposal in the third session of the 31st General Assembly of Prince Edward Island: "...in 1879, no sooner were we [Conservatives] elected than we introduced a Bill for the abolition of the Legislative Council and it received much support, but owing to the other end of the Legislature and the [Liberal] Opposition here, it failed to become law. We again introduced a Bill in 1880 for the purpose of abolishing the Council and that Bill met with the same fate...in 1881 we had a Bill for the abolition of the Council, in 1882 nearly the same form of Bill. Some changes were made in one year for the purpose of making it more palatable to the other end of the building, but they were bound not to pass the Bill. The then [Liberal] Opposition did not desire us to get the credit of passing a bill of such importance as the Leader of the Government considers this."

Despite his distinction between the elimination of an upper house and "amalgamating" a bicameral legislature, Neil McLeod traced cultural memorywork from Early Victorian Clear Grit ideas to Late Victorian unicameralism in fin de siècle Prince Edward Island. These ideas marked the ascension of "Ontario" as "the leading Province of the Dominion", an electoral system with "a free franchise--almost manhood suffrage--and that Province glories in the fact that its franchise is more liberal than that of the Dominion of Canada. If they can get along with one chamber and a so liberal a franchise, surely it is a retrograde movement for us to adopt so high a qualification." The Liberal "Bill respecting the Legislature" restricted the votes of real estate borrowers, and those without at least "$325" (not adjusted) in real estate holdings, to only half the proposed legislature. This restriction seemingly eroded the active citizenship of "farmers' sons. It is all very well to protect the rights of farmers, but I believe also in protecting the rights of sons." McLeod did not elaborate on why the sons of farmers would be affected ala Cyrus Shaw. The Liberal "caucus" intended real estate requirements, carried over from Legislative Council electorates, to promote the idea of legislative "amalgamation" over outright abrogation. He agreed that "the Legislative Council should have been recognized more than they have been, and the new House should have some name other than House of Assembly. They might at least have satisfied them with some pretence of amalgamation, instead of totally extinguishing them."

There were Conservative variations on the preceding narrative (e.g., by Cyrus Shaw) during the critical period. According to legislative records, partisan dailies, and collected memoirs, McLeod periodically began in a facetious manner. "It affords us a great deal of pleasure," he once averred, "to find that the Government have adopted a plank from the policy of the Opposition." He would ostensibly commend the "small majority's" minority government as well. "I again congratulate the Government," he reiterated a short time later, "upon adopting this policy of the Opposition."

== Sir John Sparrow David Thompson and Opposition endings ==
Dominion Minister of Justice Sir John Sparrow David Thompson, a Roman Catholic Conservative, included petitions by Neil McLeod as well as Frederick Peters and his Executive Council in a report on the "Bill respecting the Legislature" to Canadian Governor General Lord Frederick Stanley of Preston, 16th Earl of Derby and progenitor of the National Hockey League's Stanley Cup. Neil McLeod drafted two reservations regarding this "Amalgamation Bill", coupled together as "the disability". First, amendments to the "Amalgamation Bill" required supermajorities in any future session of the proposed "Legislative Assembly." McLeod argued that such a mandate could conceivably allow a session supermajority to increase the supermajority requirement to unanimity for amendment proposals, thereby generating an amendment to preclude subsequent amendments. He was most concerned with a Conservative proposition to nullify real estate (including mortgage-holder) qualifications for voting for fifteen of the MLAs into office, "having for its object the liberalizing of the electoral franchise." Moreover, Section 92, Subsection 1 of the British North America Act "clearly gives each provincial legislature...the power, from time to time, to alter and vary its constitution to suit the changed circumstances and condition of the people." The supermajority requirement for amendments spawned a potential for this scenario and "any legislation, therefore, that interferes with or restricts the majority of the members of a provincial legislature to effect a change in the constitution is not constitutional."

Second, the "Amalgamation Bill" also gerrymandered the boundaries of the Cardigan, St. Peters Bay, Murray Harbour (or Murray's River), as well as Georgetown electoral districts "and the people of one religious denomination are so grouped, as to impair their legitimate influence in public affairs." All four districts contained much of the French Acadian community, and additional Roman Catholic parishioners, in Prince Edward Island. In January 1893, Sir Thompson, leery of a Protestant electoral backlash after his own nomination for Canadian Prime Minister, counseled Lord Stanley to "take no action" on the "Amalgamation Bill." He ultimately didn't do so to pocket veto the bill. Rather, he did so because he believed that "the bill now under consideration be passed as a statute of Prince Edward Island." Once the bill became a statute, the Canadian Minister of Justice "may have an opportunity of considering the objections which have been presented thereto, as based on constitutional right and usage." Lord Stanley "approved" of this counsel. In 1894, months before his own death, Sir Thompson reviewed the resulting provincial statute and counseled "approval" by the Governor General.

== Summerside jurist in a memory of defeat ==
McLeod retired from Conservative politics in 1893, shortly after (what parliamentary reporters described as) the "Printing Debates", and accepted a standing offer to serve as Prince County Court Judge in Summerside, Prince Edward Island. He served in that position for twenty-two years and briefly invested in a silver fox ranch during the first decade of the twentieth century. Eight months after his retirement, the Liberal Party won the general elections in several landslide victories, inaugurating eighteen consecutive years of Liberal majority governments. The novels Anne of Avonlea (1909) and Anne's House of Dreams (1917), both by Lucy Maud Montgomery, contained allegories and allusions to provincial as well as Dominion political cultures during the critical period. When McLeod resigned as premier in April 1891, Lucy Maud Montgomery's father switched from McLeod's Conservative Party to the Liberal "Grits" in his unsuccessful bid for a Dominion parliamentary seat (according to a biographer, Lucy Maud expressed relief when her father lost).

McLeod died in 1915, before his youngest daughter completed secondary education at Summerside High School (now Parkside Elementary School), one of Canada's Historic Places that may or may not have been an inspiration for the school of the same name in Anne of Windy Poplars (1936). According to his Summerside obituary, "besides an extremely wide circle of friends and admirers there are left to mourn, a widow, one son, Arthur, now in Florida, and six daughters, all of whom reside in the West, excepting Miss Marie, who was one of the nurses at the front in France and is now home on leave of absence." During the last fours years of his life, McLeod periodically sojourned across the island, usually by train, with "Miss Mary McLeod." The judge and his youngest daughter revisited sites relevant to McLeod family history as well as his own life, including "the former's old home in Uigg." Summerside newspapers in Prince County continued to report on the whereabouts of his children, particularly after the "marriage in California of Mary Rogers McLeod, [youngest] daughter of the late Judge McLeod, to [the Hundred Days Offensive veteran and philatelist] John Cecil Holmes of Victoria, B.C."

In the twenty-first century, the surviving great-grandchildren of Neil McLeod's six daughters and one son provided personal and public papers, as well as material culture, from the critical period and World War I to Summerside as well as Charlottetown museums and archives. Fonds and collections have been established in their names. In 2007, the McLeod family home (until 1917-18) at 71 Granville Street garnered recognition as one of Canada's Historic Places, registered as the Judge McLeod House for Summerside tourists.
