= Great Rapprochement =

Improving US-UK relations (1895–1915)

- 1895–1915
Anglo-American Enmity / Anglophobia	Special Relationship / WWI Alliance
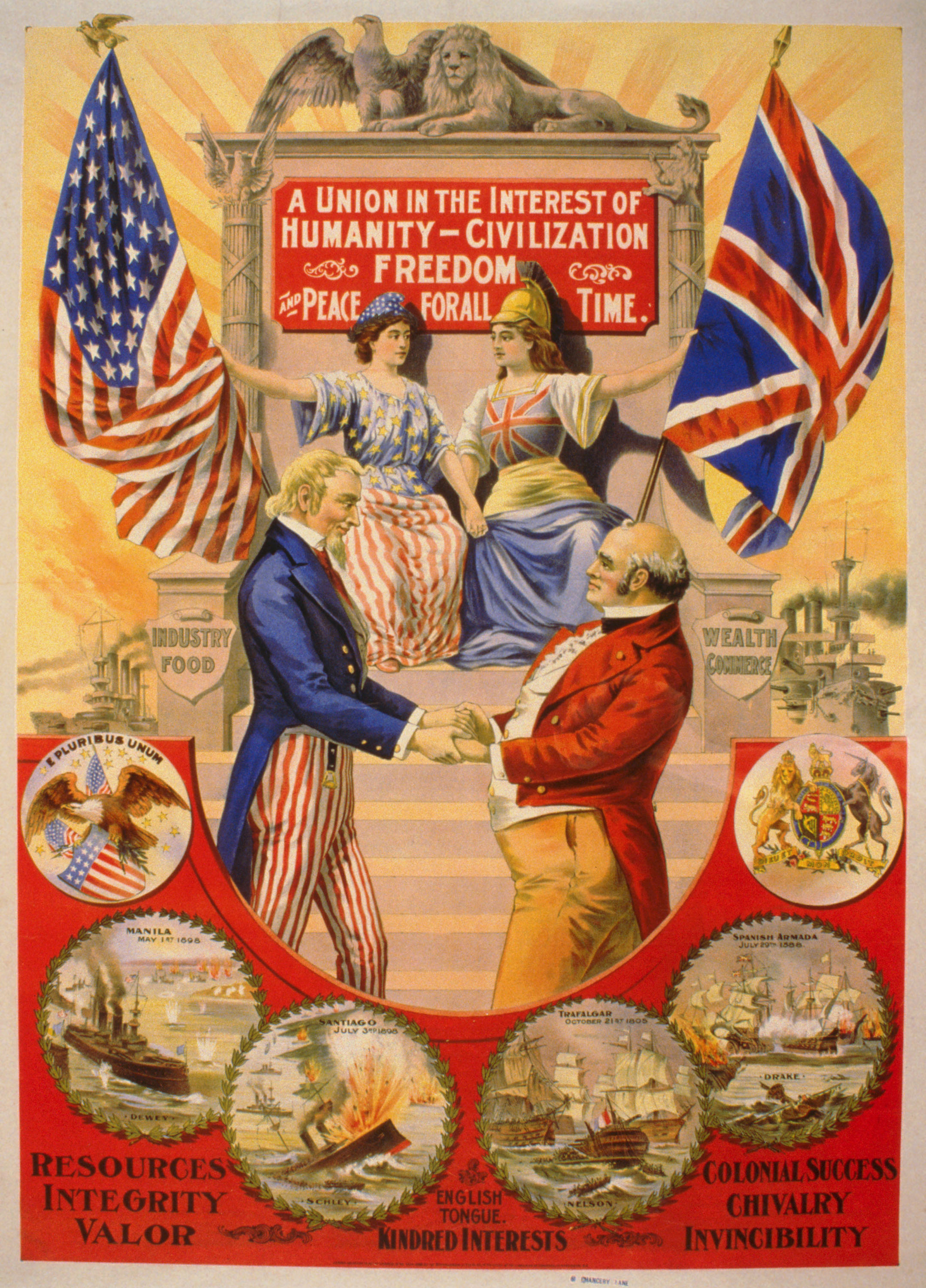
- An 1898 illustration depicting the alignment of interests between the United States and Great Britain
- Location: United States and British Empire
- Leaders: Grover Cleveland; William McKinley; Theodore Roosevelt; Lord Salisbury; John Hay
- Key events: Venezuelan crisis of 1895; Spanish–American War (1898); Hay–Pauncefote Treaty (1901); Alaska boundary dispute (1903)

The Great Rapprochement was the convergence of diplomatic, political, military, and economic objectives of the United States and Great Britain from 1895 to 1915, the two decades before American entry into World War I as an ally against Germany. In the Venezuelan crisis of 1895 President Grover Cleveland escalated a boundary dispute in South America into a confrontation with Britain. Relations were calmed under President William McKinley (1897–1901). Theodore Roosevelt, the president from 1901 to 1909, played a central role through his close contacts with British intellectuals and politicians and in his diplomatic work regarding the Panama Canal in 1901 and the Alaska boundary dispute of 1903. From 1914 to 1917, he was the leading proponent of America entering into the war on the side of Great Britain.

The convergence was noted by statesmen and scholars of the time, but the term "Great Rapprochement" may have been coined by American historian Bradford Perkins in his 1968 study of the period The Great Rapprochement: England and the United States 1895–1914. Perkins attributes the convergence to growing imperial ambitions in the United States, British withdrawal from the Western Hemisphere to focus on preservation of its African colonies and naval threat from the German Empire, and rapid industrialization and integration into the British global financial system by the United States.

== Background ==
=== American Anglophobia ===
American sentiment towards Britain was harshly negative for much of the 19th century. Enmity between the two nations, largely driven from the American side, peaked during the American Civil War and the Trent affair. After 1872 and the settlement of the Alabama claims, direct hostility declined. However, other incidents, such as the Murchison letter and disputes over borders and fishing rights between the U.S. and Canada (then a dominion of the British Empire), stoked continued American hostility toward the British. A large segment of the American public considered Britain their "natural enemy", though many Americans acknowledged closer cultural and political affinity with Britain than with those of Continental Europe.

=== American industrialization ===
The fundamental socioeconomic distinctions between the agrarian and isolationist United States and the industrialized British Empire rapidly diminished after 1865. The United States emerged from the Civil War as a major industrial power with a renewed commitment to a stronger federal government as opposed to one ruled by individual states, permitting engagement in imperial expansion and economic globalization. The post-war Reconstruction era therefore generated or expanded Anglo-American geopolitical and commercial networks.

=== 1895 Venezuelan boundary dispute ===
In 1895, former United States ambassador to Venezuela William Lindsay Scruggs, working as a lobbyist for the Venezuelan government, published British Aggressions in Venezuela: The Monroe Doctrine on Trial, claiming that Britain sought to expand their territorial claim in British Guiana to incorporate the Orinoco River watershed. Congress, led by a Republican majority under Senator Henry Cabot Lodge, called for a vigorous American enforcement of the Monroe Doctrine. President Grover Cleveland and Secretary of State Richard Olney acquiesced, adopting the Olney interpretation of the Doctrine and asserting American authority to arbitrate all boundary disputes in the Western Hemisphere. Cleveland's acquiescence may also have been influenced by his Democratic Party's reliance on Irish-American voters.

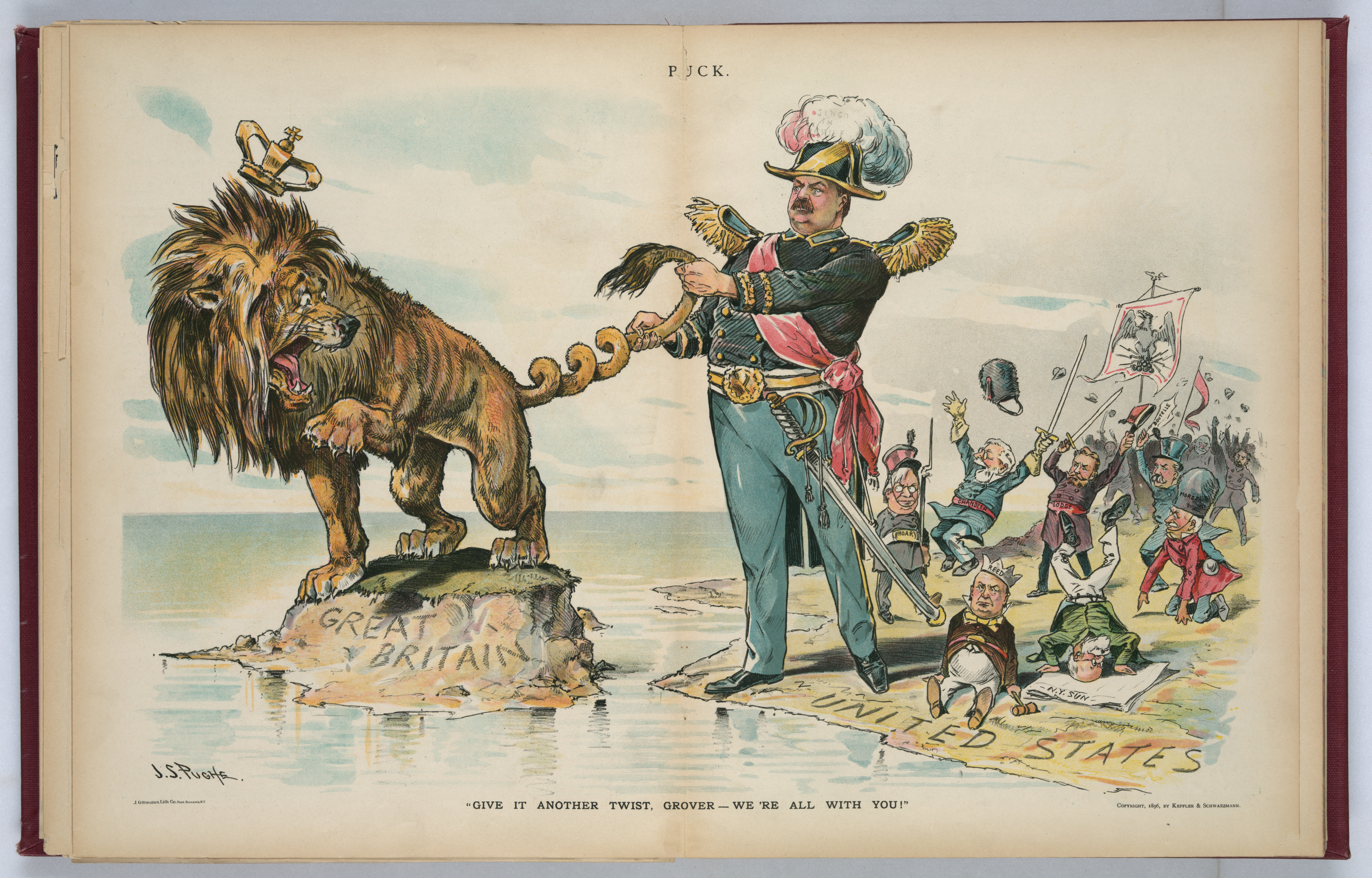
President Grover Cleveland twists the tail of the British Lion over Venezuela as the Republican Congress cheers him on.

Guided by Secretary of State for the Colonies Joseph Chamberlain, the British cabinet of Lord Salisbury rejected both the applicability and legal validity of the Monroe doctrine and asserted that Britain remained an imperial power in the Americas. Cleveland responded in kind, establishing an investigatory commission to determine the true boundary and publicly stating that his administration would use "every means in its power" to prevent British expansion into Venezuelan territory.

Partly due to the influence of business interests, who feared war between the powers, tensions were defused. The British cabinet agreed to approach the Americans diplomatically, and Great Britain and Venezuela signed an arbitration agreement in 1896. In 1899, the arbitration committee ultimately awarded Britain ninety percent of the disputed territory. The resolution of the crisis through arbitration (rather than war) and its establishment of the United States' free hand in the Americas served to ease British-American tensions.

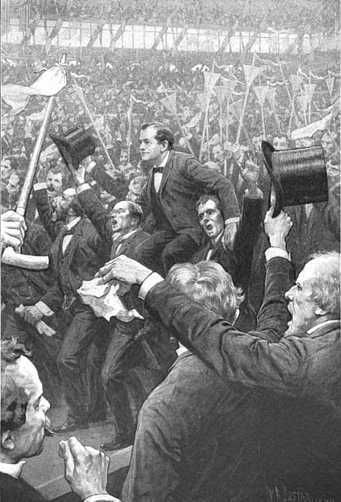
The 1896 presidential nomination of William Jennings Bryan served to alarm British interests, who saw his opposition to the gold standard as a threat to the London-based systems of international trade and finance.

=== The gold standard and the election of 1896 ===
The British acquiescence to negotiation and arbitration in the Venezuelan crisis may have been influenced by a desire to avoid negotiation with William Jennings Bryan, a leading candidate for President of the United States in 1896.

American currency policy was a dominant domestic issue throughout the 19th century with an international tinge. Generally speaking, banking interests, which were then heavily centered in London, favored a deflationary gold standard while agrarian and mining interests favored an inflationary bimetallist or outright free silver policy to reduce or erase nominal debts. The soundness of the American dollar also had implications for access to international trade, which was dominated by the gold-backed British pound sterling and German mark. Many American manufacturing interests therefore called for "sound currency," meaning either acceptance of the international gold standard or bimetallism contingent upon international agreement.

Populist William Jennings Bryan won the 1896 Democratic Party nomination for president on a platform explicitly opposed to the sound currency argument. Near the conclusion of his famous Cross of Gold speech, Bryan directly accused Britain of interference in American economic sovereignty and framed outright bimetallism without international approval as a nationalist alternative:

It is the issue of 1776 over again. Our ancestors, when but three millions in number, had the courage to declare their political independence of every other nation; shall we, their descendants, when we have grown to seventy millions, declare that we are less independent than our forefathers? No, my friends, that will never be the verdict of our people. Therefore, we care not upon what lines the battle is fought. If they say bimetallism is good, but that we cannot have it until other nations help us, we reply that, instead of having a gold standard because England has, we will restore bimetallism, and then let England have bimetallism because the United States has it. If they dare to come out in the open field and defend the gold standard as a good thing, we will fight them to the uttermost.

Other Bryanite populists including John Peter Altgeld, William Hope Harvey, and Mary Elizabeth Lease echoed this theme in their speeches, alarming British opinion. However, Bryan lost the election to William McKinley, paving the way for fourteen years of unanimous Republican government. Soon after, the Klondike Gold Rush, a final failed international conference, and the legal adoption of a pure American gold standard in 1900 effectively ended the currency issue, thereby securing British loans in the United States and putting the two countries on the same terms of trade. The resolution of the currency issue thus also served to realign Republican Party opinion in favor of the British at the turn of the century, paving the way for rapprochement under successive Republican presidents.

== Presidents and Prime Ministers during the period ==
While the period was dominated by the Republican Party in the United States, British government was split between the Conservative Party (1895–1905) and the Liberal Party (1905–16). The Republican Party became noticeably warmer toward Britain during the period, while the shift from Conservative to Liberal government favored the United States in London.

=== Other key diplomats ===
British Foreign Secretaries

- John Wodehouse, 1st Earl of Kimberley (1895)
- Robert Gascoyne-Cecil, 3rd Marquess of Salisbury (1895–1900)
- Henry Petty-Fitzmaurice, 5th Marquess of Lansdowne (1900–05)
- Sir Edward Grey (1905–16)

British ambassadors to the United States

- Julian Pauncefote (1895–1902)
- Michael Henry Herbert (1902–03)
- Mortimer Durand (1903–06)
- James Bryce (1907–13)
- Cecil Spring Rice (1913–18)

United States Secretaries of State

- Richard Olney (1895–97)
- John Sherman (1897–98)
- William R. Day (1898)
- John Hay (1898–1905)
- Elihu Root (1905–09)
- Robert Bacon (1909)
- Philander C. Knox (1909–13)
- William Jennings Bryan (1913–15)
- Robert Lansing (1915–20)

United States ambassadors to the Court of St. James

- Thomas F. Bayard (1895–97)
- John Hay (1897–98)
- Joseph Hodges Choate (1899–1905)
- Whitelaw Reid (1905–12)
- Walter Hines Page (1912–19)

== Diplomatic rapprochement ==
=== Olney–Pauncefote Treaty ===
Shortly after the arbitration agreement in the Venezuela crisis, Secretary Olney and Ambassador Pauncefote reached an agreement to settle all further disputes between the United States and Great Britain via arbitration. The treaty was approved by President Cleveland during his lame duck session and submitted to Congress with support from many academics and peace advocates, but was rejected resoundingly by the United States Senate.

=== Spanish–American War ===
In the early stages of the Spanish–American War of 1898, the common belief in the United States, fueled by Ambassador John Hay and Liberal pressmen like W. T. Stead, was that the British public took the side of the Cuban revolutionaries against Spanish colonial rule. Attitudes within the Salisbury ministry, however, were cooler. Conservative disposition opposed anti-colonial revolution as a rule and Britain had previously favored Spanish control over Cuba to protect stable trade in the Caribbean. The exception among the cabinet was Chamberlain (a Liberal Unionist rather than Conservative), who now gave speeches in support of American intervention and privately suggested an outright alliance to Hay.

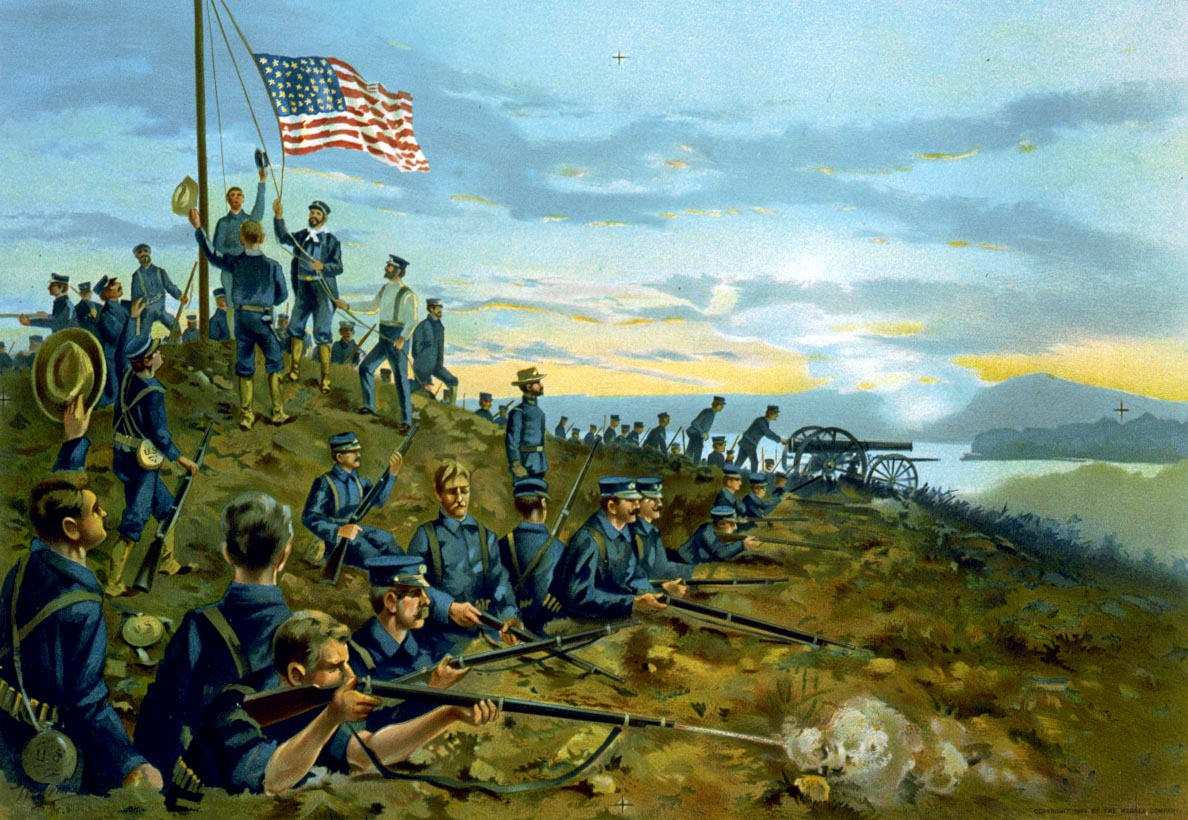
The British policy of non-intervention and tacit support in the Spanish–American War played a decisive role in the largely naval conflict and marked a turning point in the diplomatic relationship between the two countries.

However, publication of the De Lôme Letter (wherein the Spanish Ambassador suggested that Great Britain desired war with the United States) outraged the Salisbury government, and after the sinking of the USS Maine, Ambassador Julian Pauncefote rushed to express British sympathies to the Americans. Most European powers remained aloof from the conflict, fearing American retaliation, but publicly urged peace. The Salisbury ministry, by contrast, secretly sought McKinley's personal approval before urging peace and went so far as to expedite the sale of two cruisers to the United States as part of its mobilization effort. (Note: The later revelation, by Viscount Cranborne in 1902, that Pauncefote had secretly asked McKinley's permission to join the European calls for peace outraged Germany.) At Hay's suggestion, Senator Henry Cabot Lodge introduced a reciprocal conciliatory measure to pay Britain a long-withheld arbitration award. Over Pauncefote's objection and with Chamberlain's support, Arthur Balfour (acting as Foreign Secretary in his uncle Salisbury's absence) instructed a policy of strict non-interference. This ardent permissiveness toward American action set Britain apart from other European powers and was particularly decisive in the easy American victory, in light of British naval supremacy.

At times, formal permissiveness crossed into material or moral support. During the 90-day war with Spain, Britain sold coal to the United States Navy and allowed the United States military to use Britain's submarine communications cables. When Commodore George Dewey's fleet sailed out of Hong Kong harbor for Manila at the onset of war, the British soldiers and sailors in the harbor openly cheered for them.

Observing the war in the final months before his death, Otto von Bismarck remarked that the most significant event of the 20th century would be "the fact that the North Americans speak English."

The United States emerged from the war as an imperial power with possessions around the globe, and a special interest in the approaches to what in 1914 became the Panama Canal. At the same time, the British Empire was coming under increasing pressure from the growth of the German Empire's economy and navy, and it was cutting back on potential conflicts on its periphery to focus on the rising threat across the North Sea.

=== Second Boer War ===
Washington refused to give support to the Boers during the Second Boer War.

=== Calls for union ===
By 1901, many influential Britons advocated for a closer relationship between the two countries. W. T. Stead even proposed that year in The Americanization of the World for both to merge to unify the English-speaking world, as doing so would help Britain "continue for all time to be an integral part of the greatest of all World-Powers, supreme on sea and unassailable on land, permanently delivered from all fear of hostile attack, and capable of wielding irresistible influence in all parts of this planet." The Scottish-born American Andrew Carnegie shared the goal by telling Stead, "We are heading straight to the Re-United States." As American Anglophobia declined, London realized the value of a long-term ally that would prevent an upset in Britain's balance of power, which Germany and Russia appeared to threaten. The US seemed to understand and to some extent agree with British imperial aspirations, if not always with the methods used in their pursuit.

=== Venezuelan crisis of 1902–03 ===
As part of the process of imperial retrenchment, Britain resolved a border conflict between Canada and Alaska, withdrew its objections to an American-controlled canal in the Hay–Pauncefote Treaty of 1901, and agreed in 1902 to arbitrate a debt collection dispute with Venezuela.

After a final British flirtation with Germany's anti-American designs during the Venezuelan crisis of 1902–03, Britain and the United States embraced unreservedly during the Theodore Roosevelt administration (1901–1909).

== Economic convergence ==
In addition to geopolitical alignment brought about by the American turn toward empire, the United States and Great Britain resolved long-held trade disputes during the period.

=== Open Door policy ===
Britain's adoption of John Hay's Open Door Policy toward China garnered much goodwill on the western side of the Atlantic and further accelerated the pace of rapprochement after 1900.

=== Reciprocity in Canada ===
The Atlantic Maritimes played an important role in furthering reconciliation on the eve of the Great Rapprochement. The 1890 appointment of Massachusetts Republican and fishing magnate Isaac C. Hall, a key figure in developing conceptions of "provincial reciprocity," as U.S. Consul to Prince Edward Island spurred Conservative calls for "Dominion reciprocity." The revived idea of "provincial reciprocity," distinguished from "Dominion reciprocity" by Harrison Administration construction of Article 33 in the 1871 Treaty of Washington, contributed to debates in the 31st General Assembly of Prince Edward Island. These conflicts began with U.S. Senate Republicans' 1885 abrogation of fishery articles in the Treaty of Washington, U.S. Senate Republicans' rejection of the 1888 Bayard-Chamberlain Treaty (after passage of the Retaliation Act), and the 1888 U.S. presidential election. Neil McLeod, Leader of the Opposition, held that any proposal for "provincial reciprocity" would pressure the "Dominion Government to go on their marrow bones to the American Republic and ask them for better trade relations...it would show the Americans that we were in some dire distress, and without some assistance from them in the shape of trade relations, we were at their mercy. I think that when an important case, such as the question of trade relations with the United States is pending, the local Legislature should remain quiet, and let the Dominion Government carry the burden." McLeod also presaged his own proposed amendments to Liberal "reciprocity" trade resolutions--"we hope the negotiations will result in establishing the freest trade relations between the countries, consistent with the exigencies of the Dominion and our relations with Great Britain"—with his interpretations of lulls in "amalgamation" deliberations: "formerly our Liberal friends advocated doing away with the Legislative Council, but they do not advocate that now in this House. It would not be pleasing to some of their friends in the other branch of the Legislature." Alterations to Liberal "reciprocity" resolutions proved more divisive within Conservative ranks than narratives of the origins of "amalgamation." Although nine Conservative delegates (in addition to McLeod) voted for his amendments, three joined the Liberal bloc in defeating the proposed revisions.

In Prince Edward Island, Conservative challenges against "provincial reciprocity" did not preclude Conservative advocacy for U.S. trade treaties by "Dominion reciprocity" with "provincial" support. For example, when a Liberal delegate accused Conservatives of attempting to "press upon the Dominion Government to get a treaty with the United States," Neil McLeod countered that "when the Dominion Government want[s] to undertake some great measure, such as a treaty with the United States, he [the Liberal delegate] knows that instead of being weakened by the assistance of Local Parliaments, they will be strengthened by that assistance. I do not mean to say that we ought to raise any factious difficulties or anything of that kind, but we should in any and every way show the Dominion Government that when they have a really bona-fide measure to propose, we are in unison with them." Conservative appraisals of "provincial reciprocity" as a question of legislative sovereignty, rather than solely international commerce and political economy, became crucial for fictional and nonfictional narratives of Anglo-American reunion as well as burgeoning New England tourism in the Atlantic Maritimes.

== In popular culture ==
In The Moon Maid, American writer Edgar Rice Burroughs envisioned a future in which the US and Britain would form a close military alliance and in a decades-long war defeat and subdue all other nations, uniting the world under their joint rule—with Washington, D.C., and London serving as joint planetary capitals and the US President and British Monarch being the joint Heads of State of this World State.

The poem The White Man's Burden by Rudyard Kipling was written to encourage reconciliation between Great Britain and the United States in the name of cooperative civilizing imperialism.

== See also ==
- History of U.S. foreign policy, 1897–1913
  - Foreign policy of the Theodore Roosevelt administration
- Alaska Boundary Dispute, 1903
- Hay–Pauncefote Treaty, 1901
- Samoan crisis, 1889
- Special Relationship
- United Kingdom–United States relations

== Bibliography ==
- Adams, Iestyn (2005). Brothers Across The Ocean: British Foreign Policy and the Origins of the Anglo-American 'Special Relationship'.
- Allen, H.C. (1955). "15: American Imperialism (1898–1912)". Great Britain and the United States: A History of Anglo-American Relations (1783-1952). New York: St. Martin's Press.
- Anderson, Stuart (1981). Race and Rapprochement: Anglo-Saxonism and Anglo-American Relations, 1895–1904. Fairleigh Dickinson University Press.
- Beale, Howard K. " Roosevelt and the cementing of an Anglo American Entente," in Beale, Theodore Roosevelt and the Rise of America to World Power (Johns Hopkins University Press. 1956) pp. 81.–171. online
- Burton, D.H. "Theodore Roosevelt and the Special Relationship with Britain: Roosevelt was one of the chief architects of an Anglo-American understanding that survived many diplomatic crises." History Today 23#8 ( August 1973) online
- Bell, Duncan (2020). Dreamworlds of Race: Empire and the Utopian Destiny of Anglo-America. Princeton, NJ: Princeton University Press. ISBN 978-0-69119401-1.
- Bennet, James C. (2004). The Anglosphere Challenge.
- Burton, David H. (1999). British-American Diplomacy 1895–1917: Early Years of the Special Relationship.
- Campbell, Charles S. (1957). Anglo-American Understanding, 1898-1903. Johns Hopkins University Press.
- Crosskill, William (1892). The Parliamentary Reporter, or Debates and Proceedings of the House of Assembly, of Prince Edward Island, for the Year 1892. Queen Street: George Gardiner, Steam Printer.
- Hitchens, Christopher (2004). Blood, Class, and Empire: The Enduring Anglo–American Relationship.
- Neale, Robert G. (1953). "British-American Relations During the Spanish-American War: Some Problems". Australian Historical Studies. 6 (21): 72–89.
- Perkins, Bradford (1968). The Great Rapprochement: England and the United States, 1895—1914. New York City: Atheneum.
- Trask, David F. (1996). The War With Spain in 1898. Univ. of Nebraska Press. ISBN 0-80329429-8.
- Tuffnell, Stephen (2020). Made in Britain: Nation and Emigration in Nineteenth-Century America. Oakland, CA: University of California Press. ISBN 978-0-52034470-9.
- Watt, Donald Cameron (1984). Succeeding John Bull: America in Britain's Place, 1900-1975. Cambridge University Press. ISBN 9780521250221.
