= Benjamin Rogers (politician, born 1837) =

Canadian politician

The Honourable Benjamin Rogers
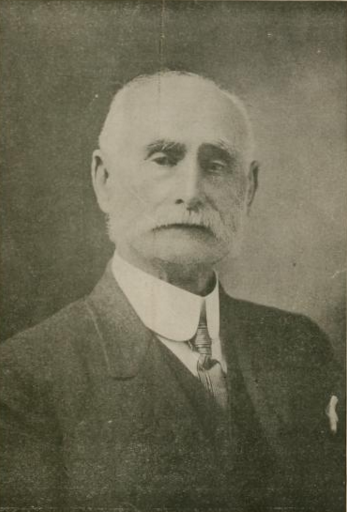

9th Lieutenant Governor of Prince Edward Island
- In office June 1, 1910 – June 2, 1915
- Monarch: George V
- Governors General: The Earl Grey; The Duke of Connaught and Strathearn
- Premier: Francis Haszard; Herbert James Palmer; John Alexander Mathieson
- Preceded by: Donald Alexander MacKinnon
- Succeeded by: Augustine Colin Macdonald

MLA (Councillor) for 1st Prince
- In office December 13, 1893 – July 28, 1897
- Preceded by: new riding
- Succeeded by: James Birch
- In office December 12, 1900 – December 7, 1904
- Preceded by: James Birch
- Succeeded by: John Agnew

Personal details
- Born: August 7, 1837 Bedeque, Prince Edward Island Colony
- Died: May 16, 1923 (aged 85) Alberton, Prince Edward Island, Dominion of Canada
- Party: Liberal
- Spouses: Susannah Abella Hubbard (m. 1862) Annie M. Hunter (m. 1898)
- Relations: David Rogers (brother)
- Children: Francis G., Frederick C., Charles R., Addie Y., Sibella Maggie, and Reginald Hiber
- Occupation: bookkeeper, merchant, farmer
- Profession: Politician
- Cabinet: Provincial Secretary of the Treasury (1900-1904); Commissioner of Agriculture (1900-1904)

Benjamin Rogers (August 7, 1837 – May 16, 1923) was a merchant and political figure in Prince Edward Island. He was a member of the Legislative Council of Prince Edward Island from 1878 to 1893 and represented 1st Prince in the Legislative Assembly of Prince Edward Island from 1893 to 1897 and from 1900 to 1904 as a Liberal member. He was the ninth Lieutenant Governor of Prince Edward Island from 1910 to 1915.

He was born in Bedeque, Prince Edward Island, the son of Joseph Rogers, who had emigrated from Wales. Rogers was an export merchant. He also served as a justice of the peace and Commissioner of Small Debts. In 1862, he married Susannah Abell Hubbard. He was leader of the Opposition in the Legislative Council from 1883 to 1891 and became a member of the province's Executive Council, serving as Commissioner of Agriculture and Provincial Secretary Treasurer. Rogers died in Alberton.

His brother David also served in the provincial assembly.
