= Foreign policy of the Theodore Roosevelt administration =

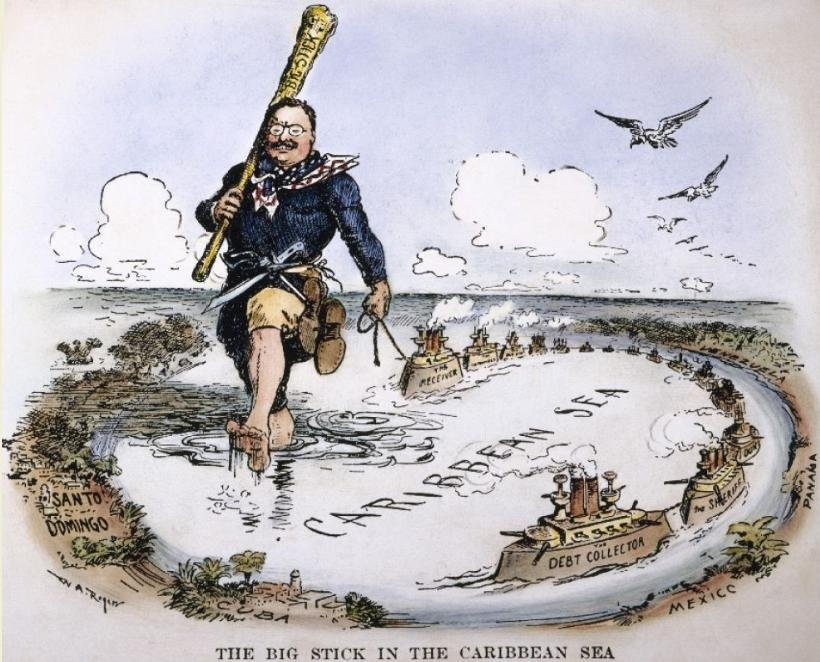
1904 cartoon by William Allen Rogers

The foreign policy of the Theodore Roosevelt administration covers American foreign policy from 1901 to 1909, with attention to the main diplomatic and military issues, as well as topics such as immigration restriction and trade policy. For the administration as a whole see Presidency of Theodore Roosevelt. In foreign policy, he focused on Central America where he began construction of the Panama Canal. He modernized the U.S. Army and expanded the Navy. He sent the Great White Fleet on a world tour to project American naval power. Roosevelt was determined to continue the expansion of U.S. influence begun under President William McKinley (1897–1901). Roosevelt presided over a rapprochement with the Great Britain. He promulgated the Roosevelt Corollary, which held that the United States would intervene in the finances of unstable Caribbean and Central American countries in order to forestall direct European intervention. Partly as a result of the Roosevelt Corollary, the United States would engage in a series of interventions in Latin America, known as the Banana Wars. After Colombia rejected a treaty granting the U.S. a lease across the isthmus of Panama, Roosevelt supported the secession of Panama. He subsequently signed a treaty with Panama which established the Panama Canal Zone. The Panama Canal was completed in 1914, greatly reducing transport time between the Atlantic Ocean and the Pacific Ocean. Roosevelt's well-publicized actions were widely applauded.

The Open Door Policy was the priority of Secretary of State John Hay towards China, as he sought to keep open trade and equal trade opportunities in China for all countries. In practice, Britain agreed but the Empire of Japan and the Russian Empire kept their zones closed. China had five times the population of the U.S., but outside the few treaty ports (controlled by Europeans), there was vast poverty. American schemes to build railways went nowhere; the one American product which the Chinese did buy was kerosene from Standard Oil for their lamps.

Roosevelt admired Japan but American public opinion grew increasingly hostile. Roosevelt made clear to Tokyo that Washington respected Japan's control of Korea. He reached the Gentlemen's Agreement of 1907, effectively ending Japanese immigration in the hope of cooling bad feelings.

Roosevelt sought to mediate and arbitrate other disputes, and in 1906 he helped resolve the First Moroccan Crisis by attending the Algeciras Conference. His vigorous and successful efforts to broker the end of the Russo-Japanese War, won him the 1906 Nobel Peace Prize.

== Background ==
McKinley was assassinated in September 1901 and was succeeded by Vice President Theodore Roosevelt. He was the foremost of the five key men whose ideas and energies reshaped American foreign policy: John Hay (1838-1905); Henry Cabot Lodge (1850-1924); Alfred Thayer Mahan (1840-1914); and Elihu Root (1845-1937).

=== Beliefs ===
In the analysis by Henry Kissinger Theodore Roosevelt was the first president to develop the guideline that it was America's duty to make its enormous power and potential influence felt globally. The idea of being a passive "city on the hill" model that others could look up to, he rejected. Roosevelt, trained in biology, was a social darwinist who believed in survival of the fittest. The international world in his view was a realm of violence and conflict. The United States had all the economic and geographical potential to be the fittest nation on the globe. The United States had a duty to act decisively. For example, in terms of the Monroe Doctrine, America had to prevent European incursions in the Western Hemisphere. But there was more, as he expressed in his famous Roosevelt Corollary to the Monroe Doctrine: the U.S. had to be the policeman of the region because unruly, corrupt smaller nations had to be controlled, and if United States did not do it, European powers would in fact intervene and develop their own base of power in the hemisphere in contravention to the Monroe Doctrine.

Roosevelt was a realist and a conservative. He deplored many of the increasingly popular idealistic liberal themes, such as were promoted by William Jennings Bryan, the anti-imperialists, and Woodrow Wilson. Kissinger says he rejected the efficacy of international law. Roosevelt argued that if a country could not protect its own interests, the international community could not help very much. He ridiculed disarmament proposals that were increasingly common. He saw no likelihood of an international power capable of checking wrongdoing on a major scale. As for world government:

I regard the Wilson–Bryan attitude of trusting to fantastic peace treaties, too impossible promises, to all kinds of scraps of paper without any backing in efficient force, as abhorrent. It is infinitely better for a nation and for the world to have the Frederick the Great and Bismarck tradition as regards foreign policy than to have the Bryan or Bryan–Wilson attitude as a permanent national attitude.... A milk-and-water righteousness unbacked by force is...as wicked as and even more mischievous than force divorced from righteousness.

On the positive side, Roosevelt favored spheres of influence, whereby one great power would generally prevail, such as the United States in the Western Hemisphere or Great Britain in the Indian subcontinent. Japan fit that role and he approved. However he had deep distrust of both Germany and Russia.

=== Organization ===
Roosevelt was a highly energetic actor who personally made practically all the major foreign policy decisions. He had strong views on foreign policy, as he wanted the United States to assert itself as a great power in international relations. Anxious to ensure a smooth transition, Roosevelt kept Secretary of State John Hay in office; Hay's health failed in 1903, although he remained in office until his death in 1905. Another holdover from McKinley's cabinet, Secretary of War Elihu Root, had been a Roosevelt confidante for years, and he continued to serve as President Roosevelt's close ally. Root returned to the private sector in 1904 and was replaced by William Howard Taft, who had previously served as the governor-general of the Philippines. After Hay's death in 1905, Roosevelt convinced Root to return to the Cabinet as secretary of state, and Root remained in office until the final days of Roosevelt's tenure. Taft increasingly became Roosevelt's trusted troubleshooter in foreign affairs, and his designated presidential successor in 1908 Roosevelt was very close to Senator Henry Cabot Lodge of Massachusetts, but otherwise largely kept his distance from congressional leaders, much to the annoyance of those senators who were accustomed to discussing diplomatic issues with President McKinley. Much of the trouble was blamed on Secretary of State John Hay, who had poor relations with the Senate in general and Lodge in particular. Hay and Lodge fought bitterly over the principle of commercial reciprocity with Newfoundland.

=== Big Stick diplomacy ===
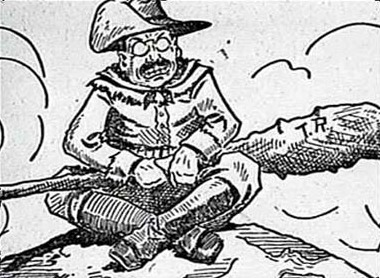
1904 commentary on Roosevelt's "big stick" policy

Roosevelt was adept at coining phrases to concisely summarize his policies. "Big stick" was his catch phrase for his hard pushing foreign policy: "Speak softly and carry a big stick; you will go far." Roosevelt described his style as "the exercise of intelligent forethought and of decisive action sufficiently far in advance of any likely crisis." Kaiser Wilhelm of Germany, who was bombastic and incautious in his public remarks, Roosevelt emphasized quiet discussion with all the interested parties to come to a consensus decision before he acted, The "big stick" generally referred to his highly visible naval buildup, and also to newspaper-based public opinion, when it became agitated on a foreign policy issue.

As practiced by Roosevelt, big stick diplomacy had five components. First it was essential to possess serious military capabilities—the Big Stick—that forced the adversary to pay close attention. At the time that meant a world-class navy. The US Army remains quite small. The other qualities were to act justly toward other nations, never to bluff, to strike only if prepared to strike hard, and the willingness to allow the adversary to save face in defeat.

Roosevelt generally followed the speak softly adage with one curious exception. He later claimed that he had personally resolved the Venezuela crisis of December 1902 by issuing an ultimatum to Germany that threatened war in a matter of days. In 1916 at a time Roosevelt was vigorously denouncing President Woodrow Wilson for being too weak to battle German aggression in World War I, Roosevelt claimed that he had threatened Germany with an immediate war back in 1902. Historians have repeatedly combed all the possible published and unpublished sources in the United States and Europe and have found no evidence whatever of any actual ultimatum being issued or discussed in Washington or Berlin. Roosevelt says he was threatening war against a major power but at the time he did not consult with his State Department, War Department, Navy Department, his generals, his admirals, nor leaders of Congress. Germany did pull back, in respond to the flareup of anti-German public opinion in American newspapers, and did pay attention to the build-up of the U.S. Navy, so it followed Great Britain in quickly accepting arbitration.

=== Great power politics ===
Victory in the Spanish–American War had made the United States a power in both the Atlantic Ocean and the Pacific Ocean, and Roosevelt was determined to continue the expansion of U.S. influence. Reflecting this view, Roosevelt stated in 1905, "We have become a great nation, forced by the face of its greatness into relations with the other nations of the earth, and we must behave as beseems a people with such responsibilities." Roosevelt believed that the United States had a duty to uphold a balance of power in international relations and seek to reduce tensions among the great powers. He was also adamant in upholding the Monroe Doctrine, the American policy of opposing European colonialism in the Western Hemisphere. Roosevelt viewed the German Empire as the biggest potential threat to the United States, and he feared that the Germans would attempt to establish a base in the Caribbean Sea. Given this fear, Roosevelt pursued closer relations with Britain, a rival of Germany, and responded skeptically to German Kaiser Wilhelm II's efforts to curry favor with the United States. Roosevelt also attempted to expand U.S. influence in East Asia and the Pacific, where the Empire of Japan and the Russian Empire exercised considerable authority. Roosevelt admired Japan. Washington and Tokyo agreed to respect each other's interests, especially Japan in Korea and the U.S. in the Philippines.

One aspect of Roosevelt's strategy in East Asia was the Open Door Policy, which called for keeping China open to trade from all countries. It was mostly rhetoric with little practical impact.

A major turning point in establishing America's role in European affairs was the Moroccan crisis of 1905–1906. France and Britain had agreed that France would dominate Morocco, but Germany suddenly protested aggressively, with the disregard for quiet diplomacy characteristic of Kaiser Wilhelm. Berlin asked Roosevelt to serve as an intermediary, and he helped arrange a multinational conference at Algeciras, Morocco, where the crisis was resolved. Roosevelt advised Europeans in the future the United States would probably avoid any involvement in Europe, even as a mediator, so European foreign ministers stopped including the United States as a potential factor in the European balance of power.

=== Relations with Britain, France and Germany ===
Throughout his life Roosevelt had a deep interest in European affairs. However he greatly enjoyed personal diplomacy; European governments consequently appointed personal friends of Roosevelt to be ambassador in Washington. More than old friendship was involved, for when Germany sent Roosevelt's old friend, Hermann Speck von Sternburg, as ambassador, relations remained strained. The key working partnerships were with Britain, followed by France. Though Roosevelt had not previously been acquainted with Jean Jules Jusserand when he became France's ambassador in 1902, the two would become close friends and worked to greatly enhance the relationship between the two nations.

Britain at this time was withdrawing from its isolationism, and forming closer relationships with Japan, France and the United States. Germany was a much more complex matter. It was a new nation – formed only in 1871, and already dominated much of the economic and political affairs of Europe. It was building a modern Navy to challenge the British Royal Navy. According to Howard K. Beale, the Kaiser respected Roosevelt and felt flattered when he was compared to the president in the newspapers. Roosevelt admired German military prowess and naval ambitions, but like many contemporary statesmen he realized that William was increasingly erratic and ran roughshod over the diplomatic niceties that smoothed out most tensions. Roosevelt saw Germany as the main adversary to American influence in Latin America, and indeed as the greatest single threat to world peace.

== Aftermath of the Spanish–American War ==
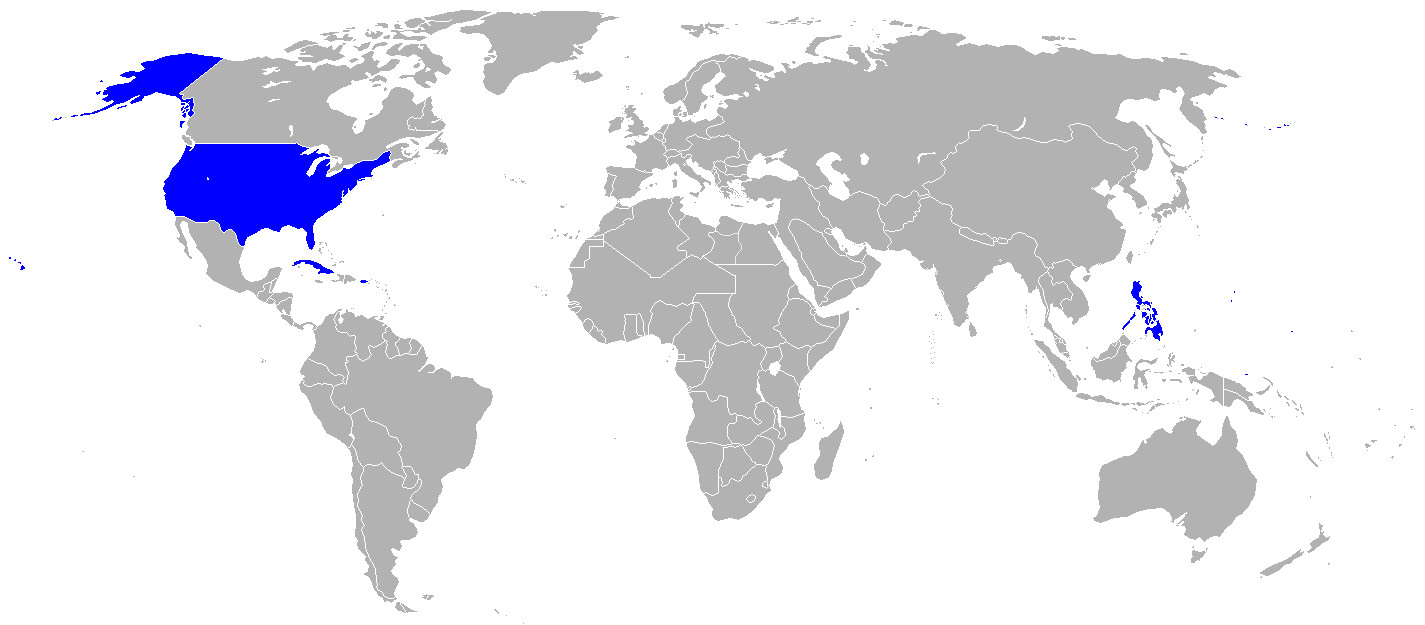
The United States and its colonial possessions when Roosevelt entered office

Roosevelt had been a major advocate of imperial expansion in the late 1890s. However, by 1905 he had lost interest in the new acquisitions and focused his attention on building the Panama Canal and guaranteeing its security in the Caribbean region. Adam Burns says, "Roosevelt began the period as an ardent imperialist and changed his views to reflect a change in US public opinion and strategic concerns....Roosevelt came to believe that retention of the [Philippine] islands would need to end sooner rather than later."

=== Philippines ===
Roosevelt inherited a country torn by debate over the territories acquired in the Spanish–American War. Roosevelt believed that Cuba should be quickly granted independence and that Puerto Rico should remain a semi-autonomous possession under the terms of the Foraker Act. He at first wanted U.S. forces to remain in the Philippines to establish a stable, democratic government, even in the face of an insurrection led by Emilio Aguinaldo. Roosevelt feared that a quick U.S. withdrawal would lead to instability in the Philippines or an intervention by a major power such as Germany or Japan. By 1902 he was in favor of early independence, although Taft argued that a longer tutelage was necessary.

The Filipino insurrection largely ended with the capture of Miguel Malvar in 1902. In remote Southern areas, the Muslim Moros resisted American rule in an ongoing conflict known as the Moro Rebellion, but elsewhere the insurgents came to accept American rule. Roosevelt continued the McKinley policies of removing the Catholic friars (with compensation to the Pope), upgrading the infrastructure, introducing public health programs, and launching a program of economic and social modernization. The enthusiasm shown in 1898-99 for colonies cooled off, and Roosevelt saw the islands as "our heel of Achilles." He told Taft in 1907, "I should be glad to see the islands made independent, with perhaps some kind of international guarantee for the preservation of order, or with some warning on our part that if they did not keep order we would have to interfere again." By then the president and his foreign policy advisers turned away from Asian issues to concentrate on Latin America, and Roosevelt redirected Philippine policy to prepare the islands to become the first Western colony in Asia to achieve self-government. Though most Filipino leaders favored independence, some minority groups, especially the Chinese who controlled much of local business, wanted to stay under American rule indefinitely.

The Philippines was a major target for the progressive reformers. A 1907 report to Secretary of War Taft provided a summary of what the civil administration had achieved in the Roosevelt years. It included, in addition to the rapid building of a public school system based on English teaching:

steel and concrete wharves at the newly renovated Port of Manila; dredging the River Pasig; streamlining of the Insular Government; accurate, intelligible accounting; the construction of a telegraph and cable communications network; the establishment of a postal savings bank; large-scale road-and bridge-building; impartial and incorrupt policing; well-financed civil engineering; the conservation of old Spanish architecture; large public parks; a bidding process for the right to build railways; Corporation law; and a coastal and geological survey.

=== Cuba ===
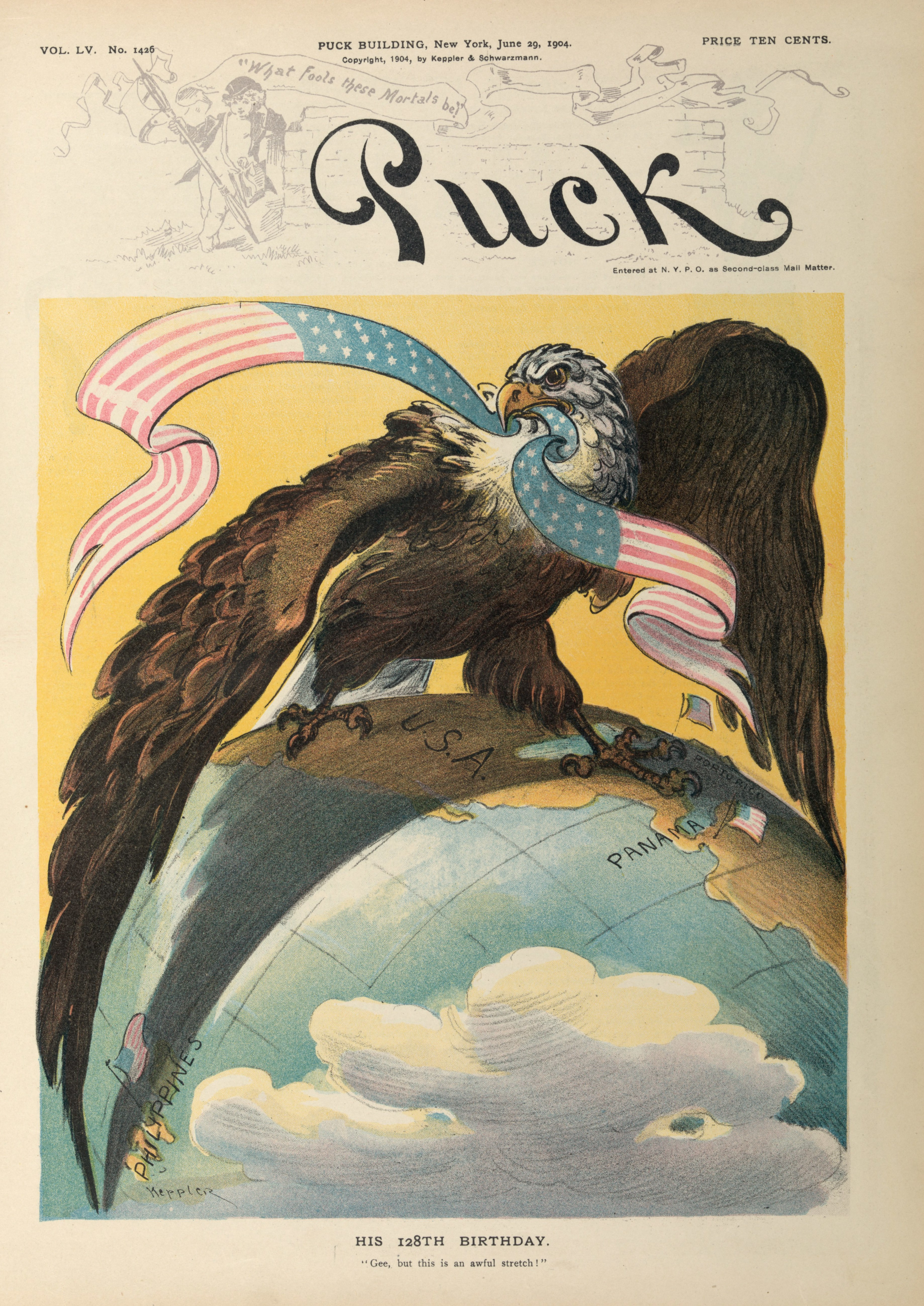
His 128th birthday, Puck magazine, 1904. Political cartoon illustrates a bald eagle standing on the "U.S.A." portion of North America, with its wings extending from "Panama" and "Porto Rico" (Puerto Rico) on the right side of the image to the "Philippines" on the left.

While the Philippines remained under U.S. control until 1946, Cuba gained nominal independence in 1902. However the Platt Amendment of 1901 made Cuba a de facto protectorate of the United States. Roosevelt won congressional approval for a reciprocity agreement with Cuba in December 1902, thereby lowering tariffs on trade between the two countries. In 1906, an insurrection erupted against Cuban President Tomás Estrada Palma due to his electoral frauds. Both Estrada Palma and his liberal opponents called for an intervention by the U.S., but Roosevelt was reluctant to intervene. When Estrada Palma and his Cabinet resigned, Roosevelt sent Secretary of War Taft briefly as acting governor, then sent Charles Edward Magoon as Provisional Governor for the Second Occupation of Cuba. U.S. forces restored peace to the island, and the occupation ceased shortly before the end of Roosevelt's presidency.

=== Puerto Rico ===
Puerto Rico had been something of an afterthought during the Spanish–American War, but it assumed importance due to its strategic position in the Caribbean Sea. The island provided an ideal naval base for defense of the Panama Canal, and it also served as an economic and political link to the rest of Latin America. Washington created a new political status for the island. The Foraker Act and subsequent Supreme Court cases established Puerto Rico as the first unincorporated territory, meaning that the United States Constitution would not fully apply to Puerto Rico. Though the U.S. imposed tariffs on most Puerto Rican imports, it also invested in the island's infrastructure and education system; the goal was to Americanize the islanders. According to Matthew P. Johnson, the Puerto Rican Irrigation Service, funded by Washington, built large dams to irrigate canefields owned by North American sugar companies. Sugar yields doubled as a result and the dams generated cheap electricity. Nationalist sentiment remained strong on the island and Puerto Ricans continued to speak Spanish rather than English.

=== Hawaii ===
McKinley convinced Congress to annex the Republic of Hawaii in 1898, as desired by local leaders. There was concern in Washington that otherwise Japan would take over the islands. In the late 19th century, the rapid growth of sugar plantations led to the importation of large numbers of laborers, especially from Japan. About 124,000 Japanese worked on fifty or more plantations. China, the Philippines, Portugal and other countries sent an additional 300,000 workers. When Hawaii became part of the U.S. in 1898, the Japanese were the largest element of the population then. Although immigration from Japan largely ended by 1907, they have remained the largest racial element ever since. Pearl Harbor became the focus of American naval and military strength in the Pacific. The telegraph cable was laid from San Francisco to Manila via Hawaii and Midway Island in 1902 and 1903, bringing inexpensive communications and linking the U.S. to the main Pacific islands and to Asia.

== Army and Navy reform ==
=== The Army gets a General Staff ===
Roosevelt placed an emphasis on expanding and reforming the United States military. The United States Army, with 39,000 men in 1890, was the smallest and least powerful army of any major power in the late 19th century. By contrast, France's army consisted of 542,000 soldiers. The Spanish–American War had been fought mostly by temporary volunteers and state national guard units, and it demonstrated that more effective control over the department and bureaus was necessary. Roosevelt gave strong support to the reforms proposed by Secretary of War Elihu Root, who wanted a uniformed chief of staff as general manager and a European-style general staff for planning. Overcoming opposition from General Nelson A. Miles, the Commanding General of the United States Army, Root succeeded in enlarging West Point and establishing the U.S. Army War College as well as the general staff. Root also changed the procedures for promotions, organized schools for the special branches of the service, devised the principle of rotating officers from staff to line, and increased the Army's connections to the National Guard.

=== Modernizing the Navy ===
Roosevelt made naval expansion a priority, and his tenure saw an increase in the number of ships, officers, and enlisted men in the Navy. According to Gordon O'Gara, Roosevelt had a major success in building the world's second most powerful fleet, behind Great Britain. New technology and managerial techniques brought in from the industrial world had a quick impact. Construction time of new ships was cut by 40%; new turbine engine technologies replaced bulky coal with oil; ships were given radios—called wireless—to communicate with each other and with headquarters; gunnery became much more accurate, and the speed of ships was greatly increased. But by building oil tankers the Navy could refuel anywhere around the world. By deepening the training and selecting highly qualified leaders such as William S. Sims, the Navy could now operate large complex fleets, far from home port. He demonstrated this success through the Great White Fleet of 1907–1909, the world's largest and most dramatic example of taking a powerful battle fleet around the globe.

Roosevelt worked with Captain Alfred Thayer Mahan and paid very close attention to Mahan's argument in The Influence of Sea Power upon History, 1660–1783 (1890) and his many magazine essays. Mahan said that only a nation with a powerful fleet could dominate the world's oceans, exert its diplomacy to the fullest, and defend its own borders. Though the new fleet did not match the worldwide strength of the British fleet, it became the dominant naval force in the Western Hemisphere.

== Rapprochement with Great Britain ==
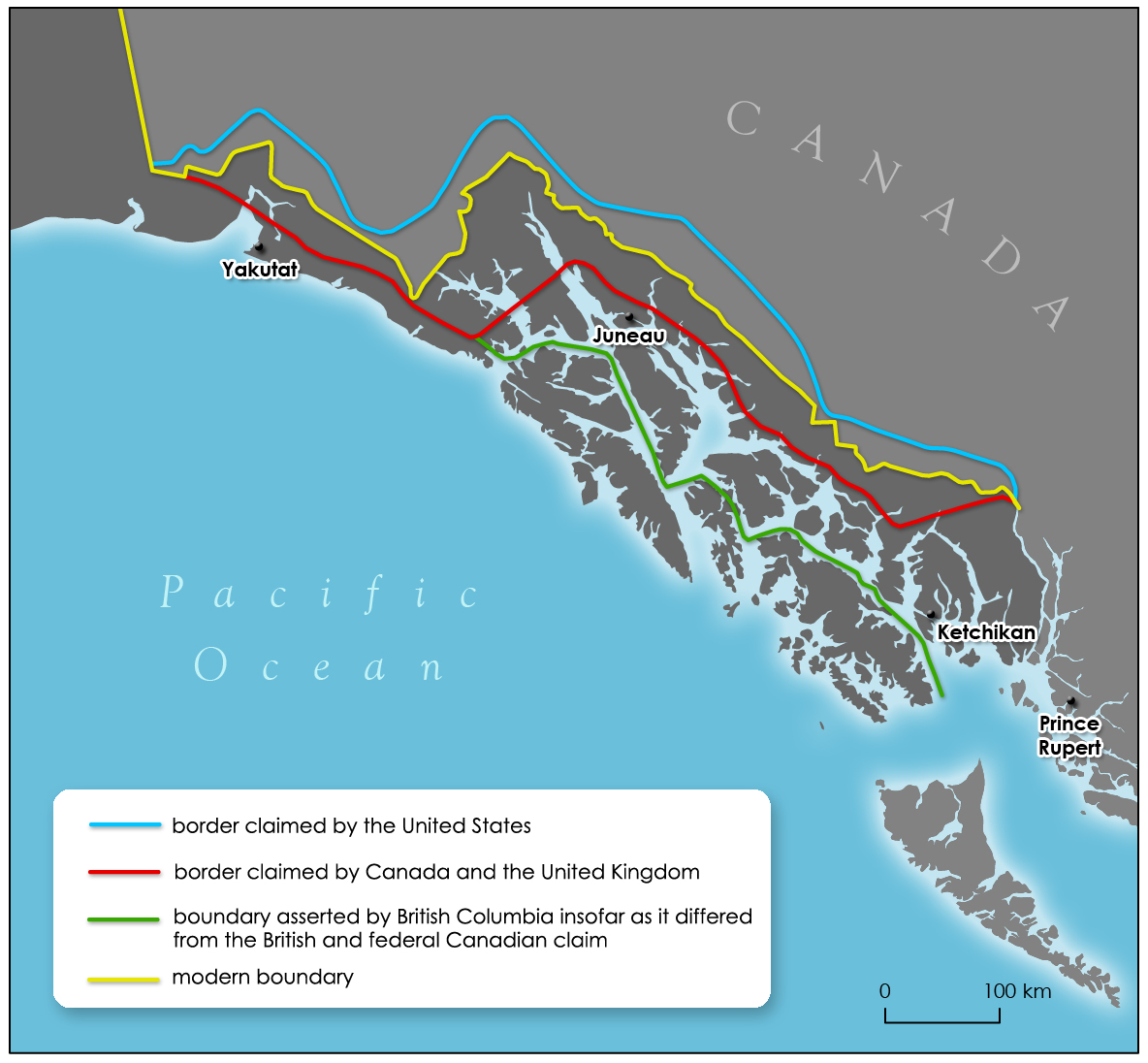
Varying claims in Southeast Alaska before arbitration in 1903

The Great Rapprochement between Britain and the United States had begun with British support of the United States during the Spanish–American War, and it continued as Britain withdrew its fleet from the Caribbean in favor of focusing on the rising German naval threat. Roosevelt sought a continuation of close relations with Britain in order to ensure peaceful, shared hegemony over the Western hemisphere. With the British acceptance of the Monroe Doctrine and American acceptance of the British control of Canada, only two potential major issues remained between the U.S. and Britain: the Alaska boundary dispute and construction of a canal across Central America. Under McKinley, Secretary of State Hay had negotiated the Hay–Pauncefote Treaty, in which the British consented to U.S. construction of the canal. Roosevelt won Senate ratification of the treaty in December 1901.

=== Alaska boundary dispute with Canada ===
The boundary between Alaska and Canada had become an issue in the late 1890s due to the Klondike Gold Rush, as prospectors discovered in the Canadian Yukon and most new arrivals took the short cut through Alaska. A treaty on the border had been reached by Britain and Russia in the 1825 Treaty of Saint Petersburg, and the United States had assumed Russian claims on the region through the 1867 Alaska Purchase. The United States argued that the treaty had given Alaska sovereignty over disputed territories which included the gold rush boom towns of Dyea and Skagway. The Venezuela Crisis briefly threatened to disrupt peaceful negotiations over the border, but conciliatory actions by the British during the crisis helped defuse any possibility of broader hostilities. In January 1903, the U.S. and Britain reached the Hay–Herbert Treaty, which would empower a six-member tribunal, composed of American, British, and Canadian delegates, to set the border between Alaska and Canada. With the help of Senator Henry Cabot Lodge, Roosevelt won the Senate's consent to the Hay–Herbert Treaty in February 1903. The tribunal consisted of three American delegates, two Canadian delegates, and Lord Alverstone, the lone delegate from Britain itself. Alverstone joined with the three American delegates in accepting most American claims, and the tribunal announced its decision in October 1903. The outcome of the tribunal strengthened relations between the United States and Britain, though many Canadians were outraged by the tribunal's decision.

== Venezuela Crisis and Roosevelt Corollary ==
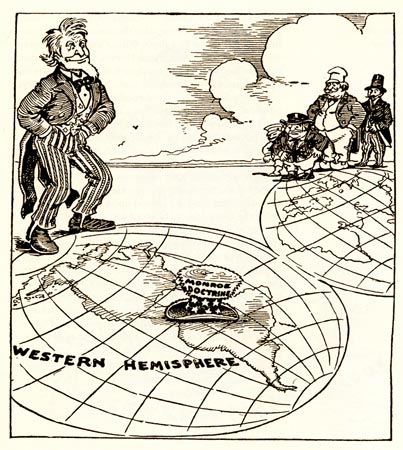
Monroe_doctrine: Europe keep out, 1912 editorial cartoon from Minneapolis Journal.

In December 1902, an Anglo-German naval blockade of Venezuela began an incident known as the Venezuelan Crisis. The blockade originated due to money owed by Venezuela that it refused to repay to European creditors. Both powers assured the U.S. that they were not interested in conquering Venezuela, and Roosevelt sympathized with the European creditors, but he became suspicious that Germany would demand territorial indemnification from Venezuela. Roosevelt and Hay feared that even an allegedly temporary occupation could lead to a permanent German military presence in the Western Hemisphere and that was a violation of the Monroe Doctrine. As the blockade began, Roosevelt mobilized the U.S. fleet under the command of Admiral George Dewey. Germany, fearing the wrath of American public opinion, agreed to arbitration and Venezuela reached a settlement with Germany and Britain in February 1903.

Though Roosevelt would not tolerate European territorial ambitions in Latin America, he also believed that Latin American countries should pay the debts they owed to European credits. In late 1904, Roosevelt announced his Roosevelt Corollary to the Monroe Doctrine. It stated that the U.S. would intervene in the finances of unstable Caribbean and Central American countries if they defaulted on their debts to European creditors. In effect, the U.S. would guarantee their debts, making it unnecessary for European powers to intervene. Roosevelt said the U.S. would be a "policeman". Europe went along and relied on the American policeman to collect its debts in Latin America.

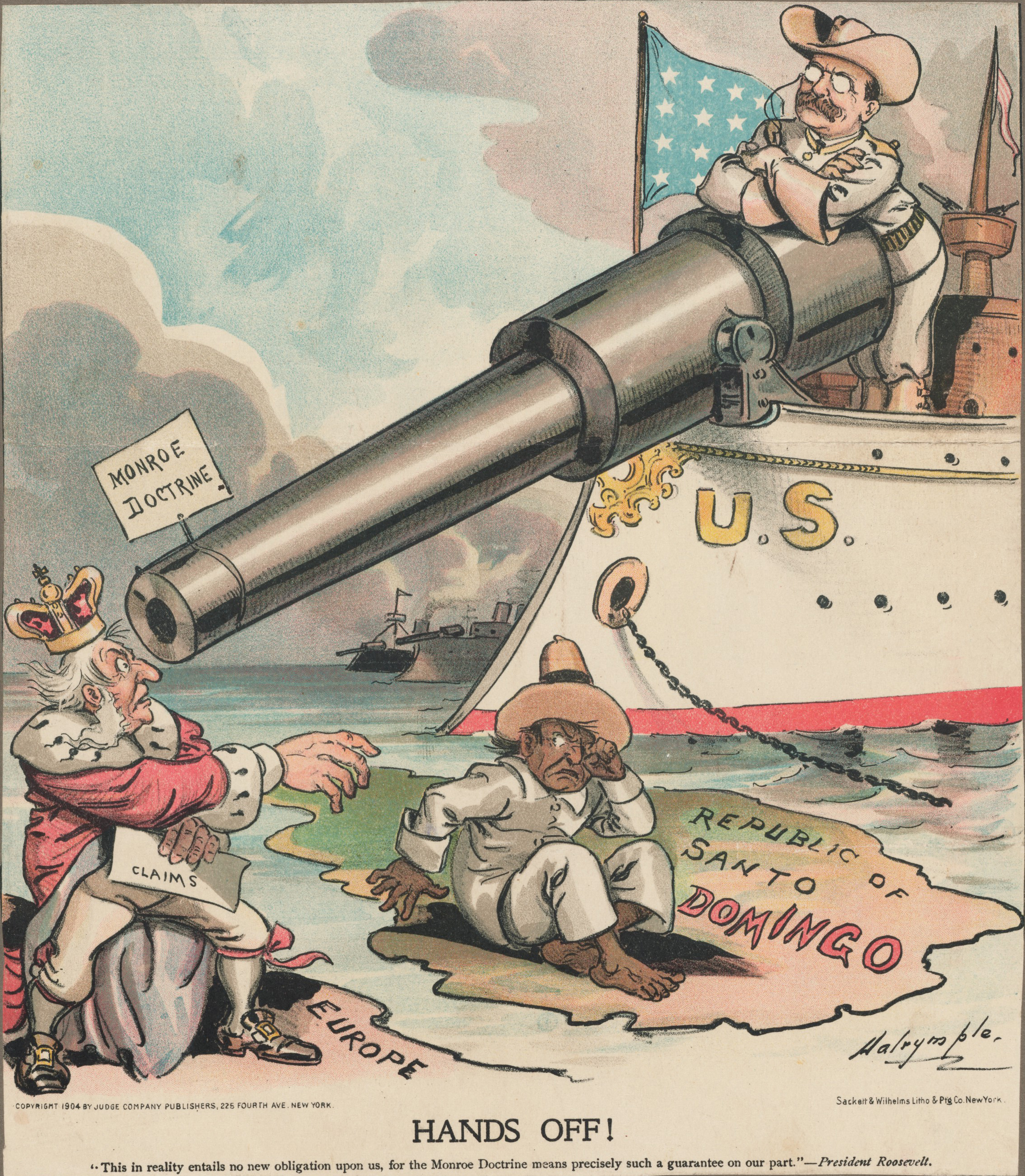
Roosevelt using the Monroe Doctrine to keep European powers out of the Dominican Republic

A crisis in the Dominican Republic became the first test case for the Roosevelt Corollary. Deeply in debt, the nation struggled to repay its European creditors. Fearing another intervention by Germany and Britain, Roosevelt reached an agreement with Dominican President Carlos Felipe Morales to take temporary control of the Dominican economy. Washington took control of the Dominican customs house, brought in economists such as Jacob Hollander to restructure the economy, and ensured a steady flow of revenue to the Dominican Republic's foreign creditors. The intervention stabilized the political and economic situation in the Dominican Republic.

== Panama Canal ==
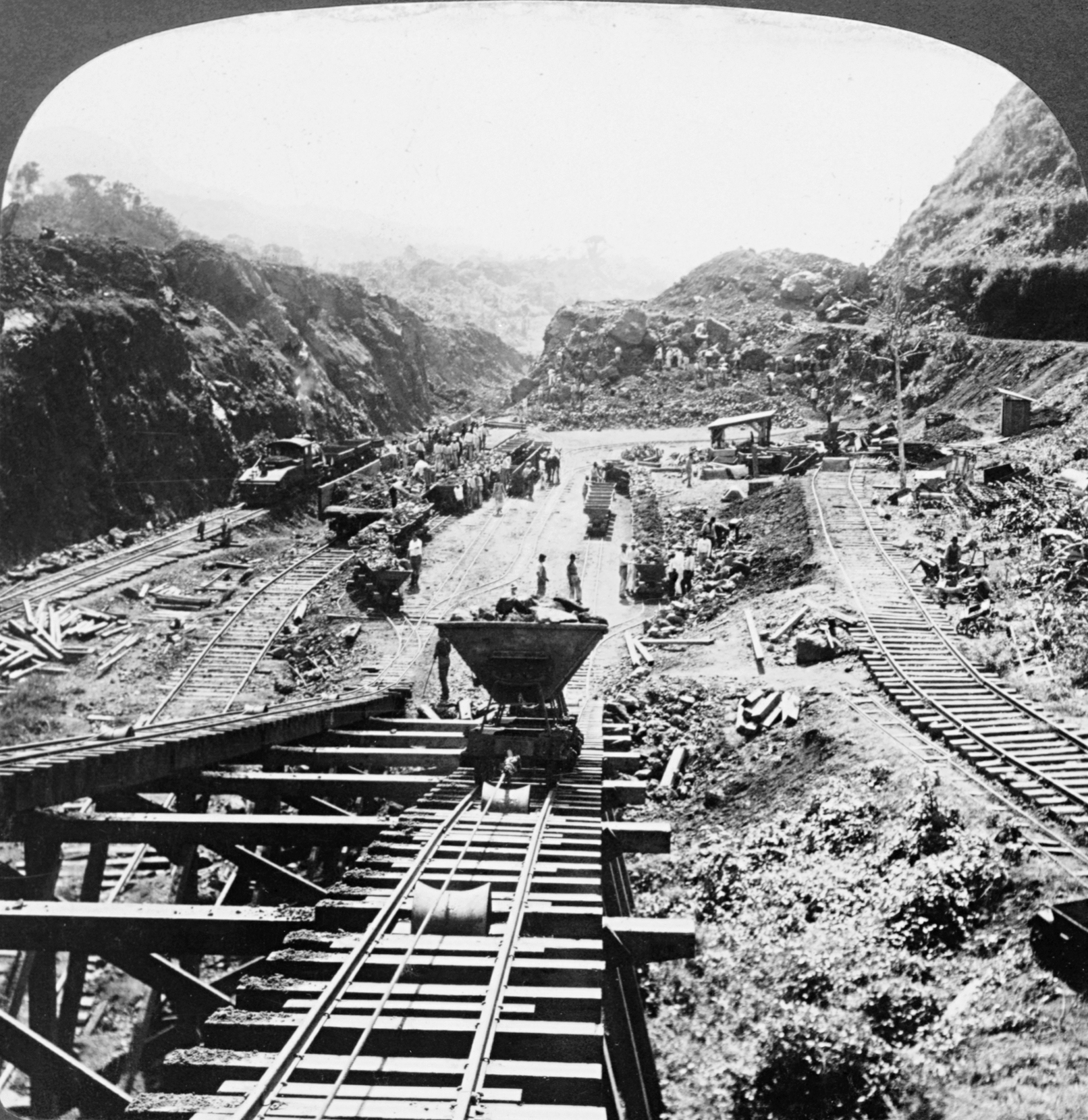
Roosevelt regarded the Panama Canal as one of his greatest achievements.

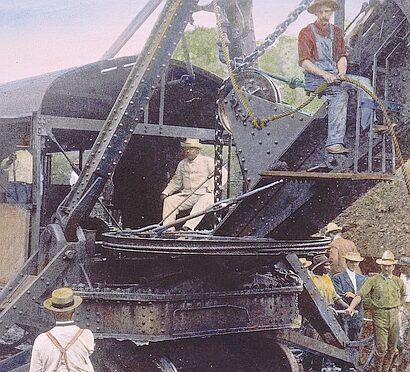
Roosevelt at the controls of a steam shovel excavating Culebra Cut for the Panama Canal, 1906

Roosevelt sought the creation of a canal through Central America which would link the Atlantic Ocean and the Pacific Ocean. Most members of Congress preferred that the canal cross through Nicaragua, which was eager to reach an agreement, but Roosevelt preferred the isthmus of Panama, under the loose control of Colombia. Colombia had been engulfed in a civil war since 1898, and a previous attempt to build a canal across Panama had failed under the leadership of Ferdinand de Lesseps. A presidential commission appointed by McKinley had recommended the construction of the canal across Nicaragua, but it noted that a canal across Panama could prove less expensive and might be completed more quickly. Roosevelt and most of his advisers favored the Panama Canal, as they believed that war with a European power, possibly Germany, could soon break out over the Monroe Doctrine and the U.S. fleet would remain divided between the two oceans until the canal was completed. After a long debate, Congress passed the Spooner Act of 1902, which granted Roosevelt $170 million to build the Panama Canal. Following the passage of the Spooner Act, the Roosevelt administration began negotiations with the Colombian government regarding the construction of a canal through Panama.

The U.S. and Colombia signed the Hay–Herrán Treaty in January 1903, granting the U.S. a lease across the isthmus of Panama. The Colombian Senate refused to ratify the treaty, and attached amendments calling for more money from the U.S. and greater Colombian control over the canal zone. Panamanian rebel leaders, long eager to break off from Colombia, appealed to the United States for military aid. Roosevelt saw the leader of Colombia, José Manuel Marroquín, as a corrupt and irresponsible autocrat, and he believed that the Colombians had acted in bad faith by reaching and then rejecting the treaty. After an insurrection broke out in Panama, Roosevelt dispatched the USS Nashville to prevent the Colombian government from landing soldiers in Panama, and Colombia was unable to re-establish control over the province. Shortly after Panama declared its independence in November 1903, the U.S. recognized Panama as an independent nation and began negotiations regarding construction of the canal. According to Roosevelt biographer Edmund Morris, most other Latin American nations welcomed the prospect of the new canal in hopes of increased economic activity, but anti-imperialists in the U.S. raged against Roosevelt's aid to the Panamanian separatists.

Secretary of State Hay and French diplomat Philippe-Jean Bunau-Varilla, who represented the Panamanian government, quickly negotiated the Hay–Bunau-Varilla Treaty. Signed on November 18, 1903, it established the Panama Canal Zone—over which the United States would exercise sovereignty—and insured the construction of an Atlantic to Pacific ship canal across the Isthmus of Panama. Panama sold the Canal Zone (consisting of the Panama Canal and an area generally extending five miles (8.0 km) on each side of the centerline) to the United States for $10 million and a steadily increasing yearly sum. In February 1904, Roosevelt won Senate ratification of the treaty in a 66-to-14 vote. The Isthmian Canal Commission, supervised by Secretary of War Taft, was established to govern the zone and oversee the construction of the canal. Roosevelt appointed George Whitefield Davis as the first governor of the Panama Canal Zone and John Findley Wallace as the chief engineer of the canal project. When Wallace resigned in 1905, Roosevelt appointed John Frank Stevens, who built a railroad in the canal zone and initiated the construction of a lock canal. Stevens was replaced in 1907 by George Washington Goethals, who saw construction through to its completion. Roosevelt traveled to Panama in November 1906 to inspect progress on the canal, becoming the first sitting president to travel outside of the United States.

== Open Door Policy ==
Roosevelt kept McKinley's Secretary of State John Hay until his death in 1905. Hay took charge of China policy. His Open Door Note, sent in September, 1899, to the major European powers and Japan, proposed to keep China open to trade with all countries on an equal basis. It would keep any power from totally controlling China. It did not end the system of "treaty ports", especially Shanghai, which remained under the control of Western powers and where they transacted their export and import business. The Open Door policy was rooted in the desire of the government in Washington to pressure big business to invest in and trade with the supposedly huge Chinese markets. The policy won nominal support of all the rivals, and it also tapped the deep-seated sympathies of those who opposed imperialism by its policy pledging to protect China's sovereignty and territorial integrity from partition. It had almost no impact in actual practice. It had no legal standing or enforcement mechanism, and it did not lead to significant new American business activity. For example, multiple plans to build railways all failed.

== Mediator for Russo-Japanese War ==
Russia had occupied the Chinese region of Manchuria in the aftermath of the 1900 Boxer Rebellion, and the United States, Japan, and Britain all sought the end of its military presence in the region. Russia agreed to withdraw its forces in 1902, but it reneged on this promise and sought to expand its influence in Manchuria to the detriment of the other powers. Roosevelt was unwilling to consider using the military to intervene in the far-flung region, but Japan prepared for war against Russia in order to remove it from Manchuria. When the Russo-Japanese War broke out in February 1904, Roosevelt sympathized with the Japanese but sought to act as a mediator in the conflict. He hoped to uphold the Open Door policy in China and prevent either country from emerging as the dominant power in East Asia. Throughout 1904, both Japan and Russia expected to win the war, but the Japanese gained a decisive advantage after capturing the Russian naval base at Port Arthur in January 1905. In mid-1905, Roosevelt persuaded the parties to meet in a peace conference in Portsmouth, New Hampshire, starting on August 5. His persistent and effective mediation led to the signing of the Treaty of Portsmouth on September 5, ending the war. For his efforts, Roosevelt was awarded the 1906 Nobel Peace Prize. The Treaty of Portsmouth resulted in the removal of Russian troops from Manchuria, and it gave Japan control of Korea and the southern half of Sakhalin Island.

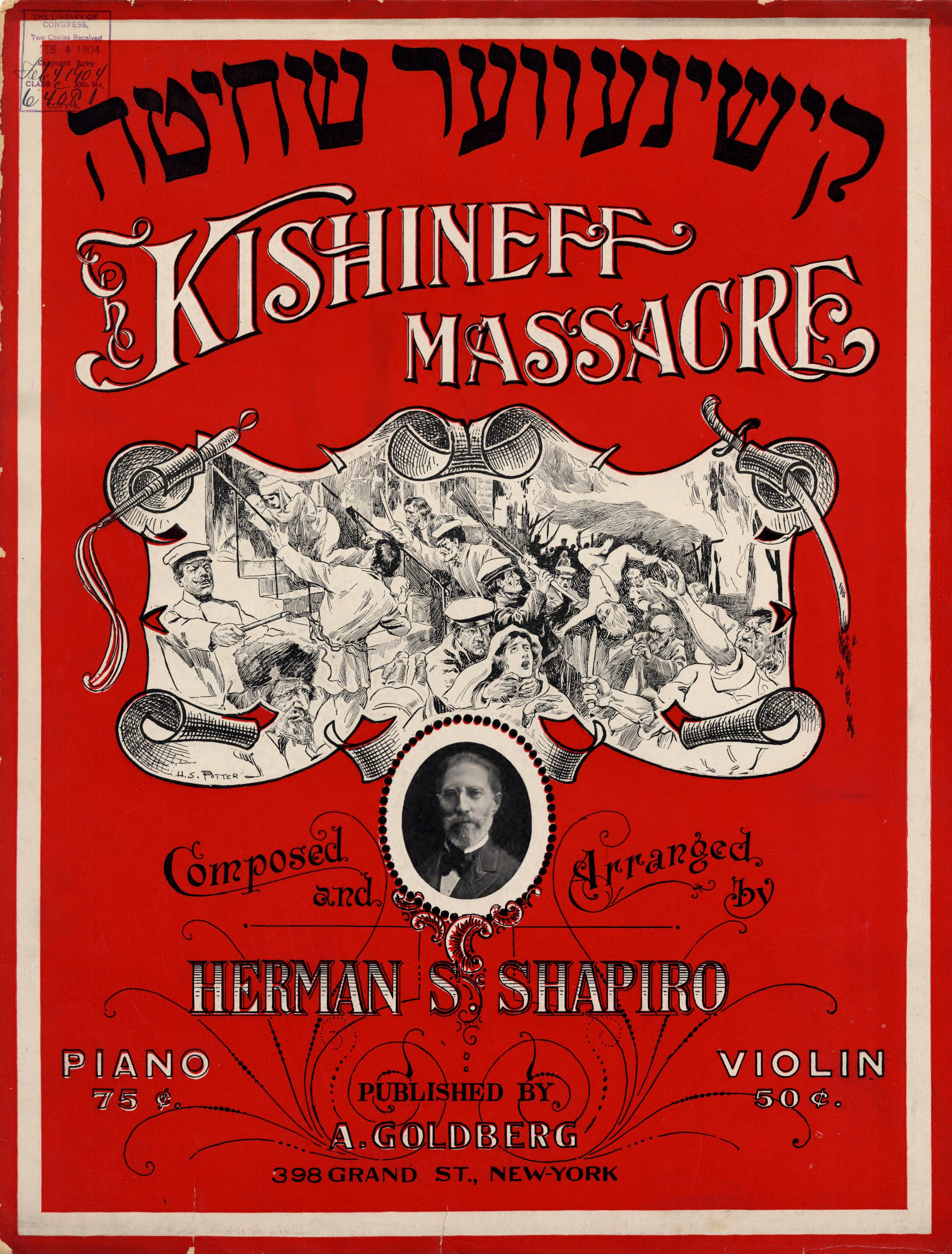
Herman S. Shapiro. "Kishinever shekhita, elegie" (Kishinev Massacre Elegy). Musical composition in New York attacking the Kishinev pogrom, 1904.

=== Pogroms in Russia ===
Repeated large-scale murderous attacks on Jews—called a pogrom—in the late 19th and early 20th century increasingly angered American opinion. The well-established German Jews in the United States, although they were not directly affected by the Russian pogroms, were well organized and convinced Washington to support the cause of Jews in Russia. Led by Oscar Straus, Jacob Schiff, Mayer Sulzberger, and Rabbi Stephen Samuel Wise, they organized protest meetings, issued publicity, and met with Roosevelt and Hay. Stuart E. Knee reports that in April, 1903, Roosevelt received 363 addresses, 107 letters and 24 petitions signed by thousands of Christians leading public and church leaders—they all called on the Tsar to stop the persecution of Jews. Public rallies were held in scores of cities, topped off at Carnegie Hall in New York in May. The Tsar retreated a bit and fired one local official after the Kishinev pogrom, which Roosevelt explicitly denounced. But Roosevelt was mediating the war between Russia and Japan and could not publicly take sides. Therefore, Secretary Hay took the initiative in Washington.

Finally Roosevelt forwarded a petition to the Tsar, who rejected it claiming the Jews were at fault. Roosevelt won Jewish support in his 1904 landslide reelection. The programs continued, as hundreds of thousands of Jews fled Russia, most heading for London or New York. With American public opinion turning against Russia, Congress officially denounced its policies in 1906. Roosevelt kept a low profile as did his new Secretary of State Elihu Root. However, in late 1906 Roosevelt did appoint the first Jew to the cabinet, Oscar Straus becoming Secretary of Commerce and Labor.

== Troubled relations with Japan ==
The American annexation of Hawaii in 1898 was stimulated in part by fear that otherwise Japan would dominate the Hawaiian Republic. By contrast, Germany was the alternative to the American takeover of the Philippines in 1898–1900, and Japan supported the American position. These events were part of the American goal of transitioning into a naval world power, but it needed to find a way to avoid a military confrontation in the Pacific with Japan. One of Theodore Roosevelt's high priorities during his presidency and even afterwards, was the maintenance of friendly relations with Japan.

The most serious tensions – including widespread speculation among experts of war between the United States and Japan – came in 1907. The main cause was intense Japanese resentment against the mistreatment of Japanese in California as shown in the Pacific Coast race riots of 1907. Repeatedly in 1907, Roosevelt received warnings from authoritative sources at home and abroad that war with Japan was imminent. The British ambassador to Japan reported to his foreign minister in London that, "the Japanese government are fully impressed with the seriousness of the immigration question. Roosevelt listened closely to the warnings but believed that Japan did not in fact have good reason to attack; nevertheless the risk was there. He told Secretary of State Elihu Root:

the only thing that will prevent war is the Japanese feeling that we shall not be beaten, and this feeling we can only excite by keeping and making our navy efficient in the highest degree. It was evidently high time that we should get our whole battle fleet on a practice voyage to the Pacific."

Pulitzer prize-winning biographer Henry F. Pringle states that sending Great White Fleet so dramatically to Japan in 1908 was, "the direct result of the Japanese trouble." Furthermore, Roosevelt made sure there was a strategy to defend the Philippines. In June 1907 he met with his military and naval leaders to decide on a series of operations to be carried in the Philippines which included shipments of coal, military rations, and the movement of guns and munitions. In Tokyo the British ambassador watched the Japanese reception to the Great White Fleet, and reported to London:

The visit of the American fleet has been an unqualified success and has produced a marked and favorable impression on both officers and men of the fleet – in fact it is have the effect our allies wanted it to and has put an end to all this nonsensical war talk."

Roosevelt quickly solidified friendly relations with the Root–Takahira Agreement whereby the United States and Japan explicitly recognized each other's major claims.

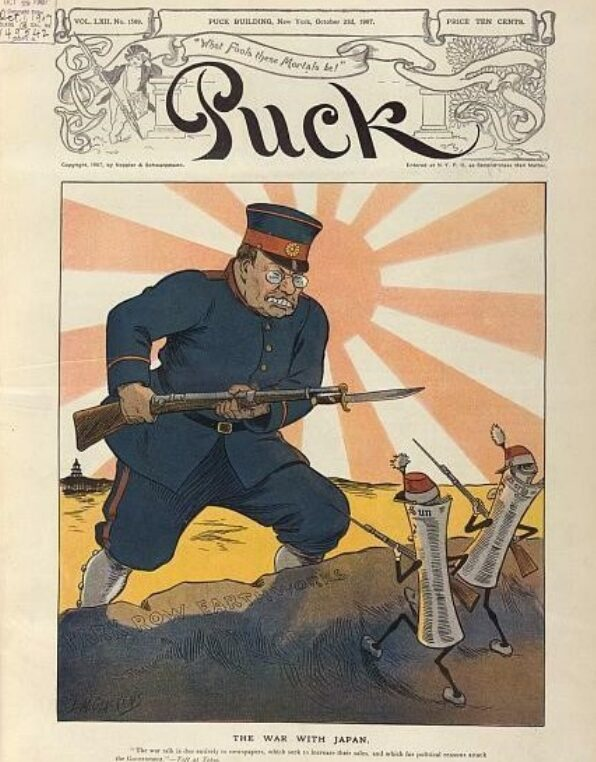
Roosevelt in Japanese uniform defends Japan, Puck cover Oct 23, 1907

Jingoistic American newspapers continued to attack Japan. The October 23, 1907 Puck magazine cover shows a Roosevelt in a Japanese uniform defending Tokyo from attack by two Democratic newspapers, the Sun and the New York World. The papers had predicted a future war with Japan and had criticized William Howard Taft, who had just been in Tokyo where Roosevelt sent him to promote improved relations.

Roosevelt saw Japan as the rising power in Asia, in terms of military strength and economic modernization. He viewed Korea as a backward nation that needed the guidance of Japan to modernize; he approved Japan's takeover of Korea. With the withdrawal of the American legation from Seoul and the refusal of the Secretary of State to receive a Korean protest mission, Washington signaled acceptance of Japan's takeover of Korea. In mid-1905, Taft and Japanese Prime Minister Katsura Tarō jointly produced the Taft–Katsura agreement. Nothing new was decided but each side clarified its position. Japan stated that it had no interest in the Philippines, while the U.S. stated that it considered Korea to be part of the Japanese sphere of influence.

The U.S. and Japan joined with the European powers in suppressing the Boxer Rebellion in China in 1900. However Washington was increasingly troubled about Japan's denial of the Open Door Policy that would ensure that all nations could do business with China on an equal basis.

Vituperative anti-Japanese sentiment (especially on the West Coast) soured relations in the early 20th century. President Theodore Roosevelt did not want to anger Japan by passing legislation to bar Japanese immigration to the U.S. as had been done for Chinese immigration. Instead there was an informal "Gentlemen's Agreement of 1907" between the foreign ministers Elihu Root and Japan's Tadasu Hayashi. The Agreement said Japan would stop emigration of Japanese laborers to the U.S. or Hawaii, and there would not be segregation in California. The agreements remained in effect until 1924 when Congress forbade all immigration from Japan—a move that angered Japan.

Charles Neu concludes that Roosevelt's Far East policies were a success:

By the close of his presidency it was a largely successful policy based upon political realities at home and in the Far East and upon a firm belief that friendship with Japan was essential to preserve American interests in the Pacific ... Roosevelt's diplomacy during the Japanese-American crisis of 1906-1909 was shrewd, skillful, and responsible.

== Algeciras Conference on North Africa ==
In 1906, at the request of Kaiser Wilhelm II, Roosevelt convinced France to attend the Algeciras Conference as part of an effort to resolve the First Moroccan Crisis. After signing the Entente Cordiale with Britain, France had sought to assert its dominance over Morocco, and a crisis had begun after Germany protested this move. By asking Roosevelt to convene an international conference on Morocco, Kaiser Wilhelm II sought to test the new Anglo-French alliance, check French expansion, and potentially draw the United States into an alliance against France and Britain. Senator Augustus Octavius Bacon protested U.S. involvement in European affairs, but Secretary of State Root and administration allies like Senator Lodge helped defeat Bacon's resolution condemning U.S. participation in the Algeciras Conference. The conference was held in the city of Algeciras, Spain, and 13 nations attended. The key issue was control of the police forces in the Moroccan cities, and Germany, with a weak diplomatic delegation, found itself in a decided minority. Hoping to avoid an expansion of German power in North Africa, Roosevelt secretly supported France, and he cooperated closely with the French ambassador. An agreement among the powers, reached on April 7, 1906, slightly reduced French influence by reaffirming the independence of the Sultan of Morocco and the economic independence and freedom of operations of all European powers within the country. Germany gained nothing of importance but was mollified and stopped threatening war.

== Evaluations ==
Biographer William Harbaugh argues:

In foreign affairs, Theodore Roosevelt’s legacy is judicious support of the national interest and promotion of world stability through the maintenance of a balance of power; creation or strengthening of international agencies, and resort to their use when practicable; and implicit resolve to use military force, if feasible, to foster legitimate American interests. In domestic affairs, it is the use of government to advance the public interest. "If on this new continent," he said, "we merely build another country of great but unjustly divided material prosperity, we shall have done nothing."

Historian Thomas Bailey, who generally disagreed with Roosevelt's policies, nevertheless concluded:

Roosevelt was a great personality, a great activist, a great preacher of the moralities, a great controversialist, a great showman. He dominated his era as he dominated conversations...the masses loved him; he proved to be a great popular idol and a great vote-getter." His image stands alongside George Washington, Thomas Jefferson and Abraham Lincoln on Mount Rushmore. Although Roosevelt has been criticized by some for his imperialism stance, he is often ranked by historians among the top-five greatest U.S. presidents of all time.

== See also ==
- International relations of the Great Powers (1814–1919)
- Presidency of Theodore Roosevelt
- Theodore Roosevelt
- Presidency of William McKinley
- Presidency of William Howard Taft
