= Cyrus Shaw =

Canadian politician (1850–1900)

Cyrus Shaw (January 25, 1850 – September 27, 1900) was a farmer and political figure in Prince Edward Island. He represented 3rd Kings in the Legislative Assembly of Prince Edward Island from 1886 to 1900 as a Conservative member.

He was born in New Perth, Prince Edward Island, the son of Robert Shaw, a Scottish immigrant, and Jane Williams, born on the island. He was educated at Prince of Wales College but was forced to end his studies after two years and return to operate the family farm after the death of his mother. In 1883, Shaw married Penelope Partridge. He died in office.

His brother Robert also served in the provincial assembly.

During the amalgamation critical period, Cyrus Shaw founded a cooperative dairy company and principally patronized Prince Edward Island dairy distributors to Atlantic markets instead of U.S. industrial distributors. He provided his own variant of "amalgamation" pasts that integrated provincial agriculture into the Conservative platform. He began the narrative in a familiar fashion, elucidating Conservative origins for the idea. He elaborated on Neil McLeod's (Leader of the Opposition) extolment of Ontario, underscoring the dissemination of Clear Grit ideas for "universal" suffrage, premised on hyperdescent across all provincial electoral districts. According to Shaw, Liberal partisans from "years gone by" opposed "amalgamation," yet they supported an expansion of popular sovereignty for the House of Assembly. By abandoning the latter, "now the Liberal Party--[was] a mere remnant of the Liberal Party." He recalled that, in regards to the bill "introduced to abolish the Legislative Council," it was "years gone by [that] this was our policy, and year after year we brought in a bill to curtail our expenditure in this direction." Frederick Peters and his Executive Council had informed the House of Assembly that they were "always in favor of abolishing the Legislative Council." Yet Shaw held in his "hand the Parliamentary Reporter for the year 1879, and I find that the honorable member was then a most inveterate and decided opponent of a measure to abolish the Council." He read passages aloud from the 1878, 1879, and 1880 editions of the Reporter, performing the "amalgamation" debates as a provincial litigator. Several Dominion polities, including the unicameral "Ontario [which] has only eighty-nine representatives for her large population," featured Executive Councils with less members than the Peters Cabinet.

Shaw's chief concern was the 1892 Liberal "scheme concerning the franchise." The "Province of Ontario" hosted industrial factories and a "floating population," but still administered "affairs with their liberal franchise." A Conservative advocate for provincial distribution of dairy products and "Dominion reciprocity," he insisted that Islanders had no such concerns because "we are cut off from the mainland for a great part of the year, and we are not likely to become a manufacturing people...This is an agricultural Province." In contrast to Neil McLeod, Shaw contended that "farmers' sons" as well as "farmers" contributed to the "farming interests." He also provided a partial explanation for McLeod's references to "farmers' sons:" many of these sons "who have gone abroad have made their mark in the world--many have taken prominent positions" without investing in Prince Edward Island real estate or, for eldest sons, inheriting real estate prior to the death of the fathers. He concluded that only allowing proprietors and mortgage-holders to vote for the entire "Legislative Assembly," while non-property holders and borrowers voted for half of the total number of MLAs, gave "non-property holders one vote and property holders two, [which] is simply disfranchising the young men." This conclusion paraphrased Liberal representative Donald Farquharson's comments from the 1878 Reporter, "but now he thinks it is quite proper, and he will support the policy he, at that time, so strongly denounced. Such glaring inconsistency was never exhibited upon the floor of this parliament." Visual spectres of "glaring inconsistency" haunted the Province House seat because the "Liberal Government" had "gone back upon the record of the old Liberal Party, and well might they be ashamed of the portraits which adorn the walls of this room."
