= John Collier Underhay =

Canadian politician (1829–1919)

John Collier Underhay (15 January 1829 – 23 October 1919) was a farmer, land surveyor and political figure in Prince Edward Island. He represented 1st Kings from 1879 to 1882 and 2nd Kings from 1886 to 1893 in the Legislative Assembly of Prince Edward Island as a Liberal and then a Conservative member.

He was born in Bay Fortune, Prince Edward Island, the son of William Underhay and Marianne Withers. In 1856, he married Rosaline, the daughter of James Craswell, a member of the province's Legislative Council. Underhay was a justice of the peace and also served as postmaster at Grand River. He was the head of the Independent Order of Good Templars in the province.

Underhay was an unsuccessful candidate for a seat in the province's legislative council in 1874 and was defeated when he ran for reelection in 1882.

In 1893, following the passage of the "Bill respecting the Legislature" in the House of Assembly, the focus of debates in the fourth session of the 31st General Assembly of Prince Edward Island shifted to the most appropriate vehicle for coalescing narratives of legislative "amalgamation" in print. Underhay and editor William Crosskill's Parliamentary Reporter took center stage. The so-called "Printing Debates" began in earnest on 10 March 1893, when Underhay, a member of the Special Committee charged with accepting tenders from publisher George Gardiner "for printing and binding the Debates," expressed frustration at the "mode adopted with respect to the publication of the Debates." Moreover, in order to diminish costs, "he thought that if a subsidy were granted to some newspaper for publication of the Debates in a daily sheet it would give better satisfaction." Liberal delegates argued that the Special Committee fielded "tenders for the publication of the debates" and, in that way, served as an additional editorial committee. Frederick Peters claimed that all previous sessions of the House of Assembly "appointed reporters, and that the House cannot now well dispense with them."

In his twilight days as Leader of the Opposition, Neil McLeod participated in these discussions on print, ideas, memory, and public finance. McLeod discounted the notion that Special Committee members served as secondary editors because "that is no proof that the system now proposed is entirely wrong." He then questioned the Frederick Peters narrative of the appointment of reporters by "the late Government and their predecessors." McLeod declared that it was "a matter of fact" that "during the session of 1883 the late Government did dispense with reporters, and there is no Parliamentary Reporter for that year." Despite these alleged inaccuracies, McLeod concurred that previous sessions of the House of Assembly had "found that an official report was absolutely necessary, as they never could hold the then Opposition members to the statements which they had made in the course of debate without such a record." McLeod himself believed that, "under ordinary circumstances," it would "be better to have the debates published in the usual form, as it will have the effect of restraining honorable members of the Government, and holding them responsible for the language used by them in debate." In such "ordinary circumstances," he held, "as the Parliamentary Reporter is a record of the proceedings of the House, I think the system should be continued."

Neil McLeod, however, preferred an alternate publication because of the absence of many, but by no means all, financial records and speeches by Liberal representatives in the Parliamentary Reporter. In Liberal narratives, these particular sources purportedly confirmed Conservative deficits as causation for the need to "amalgamate." During the third session, "many important debates were not reported at all, for the discussions were carried on with closed doors, the reporters having been turned out." Certain debates over Conservative deficits and debentures that contributed to passage of the "Amalgamation Bill" were far from "ordinary," yet "not a sentence of those debates were reported or published in the Parliamentary Reporter or anywhere else." McLeod estimated that "about one-fourth of the Journal of the House is made up of statements that contain returns and statements [that] have been ordered not to be printed, and as the speeches on those documents are published in the Parliamentary Reporter, it will be well for us to have those speeches, for they afford us the only information respecting those documents." Liberal delegates retorted that Conservatives had made accusations of similar omissions prior to "amalgamation" bills, further denied any collusion with editor William Crosskill in source deletions, and then defeated Underhay's proposal. Aside from the (ironic) publication of these "Printing Debates" in the Reporter, observations and positions of Crosskill and his reporters remain subjects of scholarly inquiry. In 1899, Crosskill published the first edition of a book that interwove "tourist attractions, history, and sociological features" into a Prince Edward Island fabric, revising the book over three editions to maintain the "reliable and up-to-date" contours of institutional and statistical "authenticated and furnished facts." The second and third editions were "revised and rewritten" to emphasize his conception of "history" over "sociological features" and vice-versa. Passages from the first edition as well as "rewritten" contentions and "facts" warrant critical examination, especially those on leaseholding, the persistence of "practically universal suffrage" after 1893, agriculture, oyster mussel mud digging, the educational system, and Gaelic as well as French Acadian populations.

Legislative reporter Frank H. Risteen's four editions of The Celestial City was another contemporaneous example, published after General Assembly debates over unicameralism in the capital of New Brunswick. The 1898 first edition narrated the origins of the provincial General Assembly in Fredericton and associated unicameral built environments. Risteen's depiction of Fredericton and wider New Brunswick infrastructure, ecologies, and commerce warrant critical examination, especially his passages on "a town of 2,500 inhabitants owned and controlled by one man more absolutely than the Czar of Russia controls his vast domains; but the reign of this industrial Alexander is a beneficient one; his subjects are contented and law-abiding, and Marysville is in all respects a model community." Periodicals published for "the social and political advancement" of Irish Roman Catholics and French Acadians in New Brunswick similarly illuminated the politics of "race and religion" for, and illustrated narratives crafted by, parliamentary reporters such as Michael McDade. In 1902, McDade recounted his early days as a "boy [sent] to Fredericton to take his first lessons in parliamentary reporting."
