= James E. Birch =

James E. Birch may refer to:

- James E. Birch (entrepreneur) (1827–1857), stagecoach line entrepreneur in California
- James Birch (politician) (1849–1941), merchant, horse breeder and political figure in Prince Edward Island
