= Gilbert Buote =

Canadian educator (1833–1904)

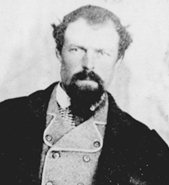
- Born: February 20, 1833; Miscouche, Prince Edward Island
- Died: July 16, 1904 (aged 71); Tignish, Prince Edward Island
- Occupations: Educator, publisher, author
- Notable work: L'Impartial, Placide, l'homme mystérieux
- Spouse: Madeleine Gallant
- Children: 1

Gilbert Buote (February 20, 1833 – July 16, 1904) was an Acadian educator, publisher and author.

Buote was born in Miscouche, Prince Edward Island. Having obtained a first-class teaching certificate, he began his career at the Tignish village school in 1851.

He, along with his son François-Joseph, founded and published the first Acadian newspaper on the Island, L'Impartial, in June 1893. His novel, Placide, l'homme mystérieux, was published in 30 installments in L'Impartial, between 1904 and 1906. Gilbert was married to Madeleine Gallant on February 20, 1860. Buote propounded "amalgamation" consensus in a French Acadian community of "relatively few" riven by "Liberal and Conservative" factionalism. These remonstrances, as well as Liberal Party gerrymandering of Roman Catholic voters, precipitated the June 1893 founding of L'Impartial, a newspaper featuring the masthead motto "unity is strength" for the "small Acadian population of the Island." French Acadian factionalism came on the heels of a successful 1891 motion, by Neil McLeod, to incorporate the Roman Catholic Watchman newspaper (named after lighthouse keepers and/or the famed P.E.I. sandhill) into the "Watchman Publishing Company." Watchman editors subsequently endorsed McLeod's variant of the Conservative "amalgamation" narrative, which centered enfranchisement, until the 1901 Scott Act.

He died in Tignish, Prince Edward Island.
