= Patrilineality =

Tracing of kinship through the male line

Patrilineality, also known as the male line, the spear side or agnatic kinship, is a common kinship system in which an individual's family membership derives from and is recorded through their father's lineage. It generally involves the inheritance of property, rights, names, or titles by persons related through male kin. This is distinguished from cognate kinship which is through any combination of lineages, and from matrilineality which is through the mother's lineage, also called the spindle side, the distaff side or enatic kinship.

A patriline ("father line") is a person's father, and additional ancestors, as traced only through males.

== In the Bible ==
In the Bible, family and tribal membership appears to be transmitted through the father. For example, a person is considered to be a priest or Levite, if his father is a priest or Levite, and the members of all the Twelve Tribes are called Israelites because their father is Israel (Jacob).

In the first lines of the New Testament, the descent of Jesus Christ is counted through the male lineage from Abraham through King David to Joseph (the husband of Mary, mother of Jesus).

== Agnatic succession ==
Patrilineal or agnatic succession gives priority to or restricts inheritance of a throne or fief to male heirs descended from the original title holder through males only. Traditionally, agnatic succession is applied in determining the names and membership of European dynasties. The prevalent forms of dynastic succession in Europe, Asia and parts of Africa were male-preference primogeniture, agnatic primogeniture, or agnatic seniority until after World War II. The agnatic succession model, also known as Salic law, meant the total exclusion of women as hereditary monarchs and restricted succession to thrones and inheritance of fiefs or land to men in parts of medieval and later Europe. This form of strict agnatic inheritance has been officially revoked in all extant European monarchies.

By the 21st century, most ongoing European monarchies had replaced their traditional agnatic succession with absolute primogeniture, meaning that the first child born to a monarch inherits the throne, regardless of the child's sex.

== Genetic genealogy ==
The fact that human Y-chromosome DNA (Y-DNA) is paternally inherited enables patrilines and agnatic kinships of men to be traced through genetic analysis.

Y-chromosomal Adam (Y-MRCA) is the patrilineal most recent common ancestor from whom all Y-DNA in living men is descended. An identification of a very rare and previously unknown Y-chromosome variant in 2012 led researchers to estimate that Y-chromosomal Adam lived 230,000 years ago. Before this discovery, estimates of the date when Y-chromosomal Adam lived were much more recent, estimated to be tens of thousands of years.

== See also ==
- Agnatic seniority
- Cadet branch
- Derbfine
- Family name
- Historical inheritance systems
- Hypodescent
- Hyperdescent
- Maiden and married names
- Matrilineality
- Matriname
- Order of succession
- Patricide
- Patriarchy
- Patrilocal residence
- Primogeniture
- Royal and noble ranks
- Y chromosome
