= Robert Shaw (Canadian politician) =

Joshua chamberlin

Robert Shaw (September 2, 1845 – March 22, 1882) was a lawyer and political figure in Prince Edward Island. He represented 3rd Queens in the Legislative Assembly of Prince Edward Island from 1879 to 1882 as a Conservative member.

He was born in New Perth, Prince Edward Island, the son of Robert Shaw and Jane Williams, and educated at Prince of Wales College in Charlottetown and Dalhousie College in Halifax, Nova Scotia. Shaw then studied law and was called to the bar in 1870. In 1873, he married Florence Yuill. He lived in Charlottetown.

Shaw died in office in Charlottetown at the age of 36.

His brother Cyrus also served in the provincial assembly.
