= Angus MacLeod (politician) =

Canadian politician

Angus MacLeod (1845 – February 4, 1908) was a farmer and political figure on Prince Edward Island. He represented 4th Kings in the Legislative Assembly of Prince Edward Island from 1886 to 1893 as a Liberal.

He was born in Valleyfield, Prince Edward Island, the son of Alexander MacLeod, of Scottish descent, and was educated there. He later settled in Montague. He taught school for 15 years before becoming a farmer. In 1872, he married Jessie McDonald. After 1886, Sullivan Cabinet (Executive Council) minutes and most newspapers distinguished him from former Premier Neil McLeod. In the Parliamentary Reporter, editor William Crosskill transcribed the former Premier's surname as both "McLeod" and "MacLeod," but included Neil McLeod's 5th Queens (Charlottetown Common) district next to the dual surname spellings. Similarly, W.E. Hodgins, editor of compiled petitions to Canadian Ministers of Justice, included both variants of the surname for the former Premier.

Angus MacLeod was defeated when he ran for reelection in 1893. He died in Montague.
