= Hay–Pauncefote Treaty =

1901 treaty between the United States and Great Britain

The Hay–Pauncefote Treaty is a treaty signed by the United States and Great Britain on 18 November 1901, as a legal preliminary to the U.S. building of the Panama Canal. It nullified the Clayton–Bulwer Treaty of 1850 and gave the United States the right to create and control a canal across the Central American isthmus to connect the Pacific Ocean and the Atlantic Ocean. In the Clayton–Bulwer Treaty, both nations had renounced building such a canal under the sole control of one nation.

== Background ==
In the United States, for some years public irritation had been growing over the Clayton–Bulwer Treaty's restriction on that country's independent action. The British recognized their diminishing influence in the region and determined to cultivate the United States as a counterweight to Germany's influence in Central and South America. Fresh negotiations were opened, and Great Britain gave its diplomat very liberal instructions, to concede whatever did not nullify the essential principle of neutrality of access.

== Negotiations ==
A draft treaty was sent to the United States Senate by U.S. President William McKinley on 5 February 1900. It provided (1) that a canal might be constructed by the United States, or under its direction, (2) that the canal should be permanently neutralized on the model of the Suez Canal agreement — to be kept open at all times, either of war or peace, to all vessels, without discrimination, and no fortifications to be constructed commanding the canal or the waters adjacent, and (3) that other powers should be invited to join in this guaranty of neutrality. These provisions excited intense hostility in the U.S., and Senator Henry G. Davis offered an amendment adopted by the Committee on Foreign Affairs. The amendment provided that the neutralization clause should not prevent the United States from any measures it thought needful for its own defense or the preservation of order, specifically declared the Clayton–Bulwer Treaty abrogated, and struck out the third clause inviting the concurrence of other powers. The Senate ratified the Treaty with this amendment on 20 December 1900, but Great Britain refused to accept the amended treaty, and it expired by limitation on 5 March 1901.

== Final treaty ==
The two diplomats, United States Secretary of State John Hay and British Ambassador to the United States Lord Pauncefote, set to work on a compromise, which they signed on 18 November 1901. President Theodore Roosevelt sent it to the Senate, which ratified it on 16 December. In its final form, the Hay–Pauncefote Treaty abrogated the Clayton–Bulwer Treaty, did not forbid the United States from constructing fortifications, and did not require that the canal be kept open in time of war. The Treaty ceded to the United States the right to build and manage a canal, provided that all nations would be allowed access, and that the canal should never be taken by force.

== Tolls controversy ==
Prior to the opening of the Panama Canal to traffic on 15 August 1914, a controversy with Great Britain respecting the interpretation of the Hay–Pauncefote Treaty arose. Under the Panama Canal Act of 1912, United States vessels engaged in the coast-to-coast trade between U.S. ports were to be exempted from canal tolls. Sir Edward Grey, the British Foreign Secretary, lodged a protest and claimed that the act discriminated against British and other foreign vessels in contravention of the Treaty, and requested that the Senate forgo action on the bill in order that a detailed statement might be sent, but President Taft signed the Act on 24 August. In a formal protest lodged on 9 December, Grey declared that "while the Hay–Pauncefote Treaty left the United States free to build and protect the canal, it expressly maintained the principle of Article VIII of the Clayton–Bulwer Treaty of 1850, guaranteeing to England the use of the canal on a complete equality with the United States of America." On 27 February 1913 he pressed for arbitration. In the United States, the British contention was generally regarded as an attempt to interfere with the United States' sovereign rights to regulate its own commerce, and to use the canal in whatsoever manner it saw fit. A minority, led by Republican Senator Elihu Root, held that the British objection was based on solid grounds.

President Wilson took office in 1913 and on 5 March 1914, Wilson sent a message to Congress strongly urging the repeal of the exemption. He regarded the exemption as a plain breach of the Hay–Pauncefote Treaty and declared that it was only in the United States that there was any doubt as to its language. He proposed a "voluntary withdrawal from a position everywhere questioned and misunderstood." He faced strong opposition from his own party members whose 1912 Democratic Party platform had committed them to guaranteeing free passage for U.S. Nevertheless, President Wilson forced his own party members to accept a repeal of the exemption, but not before a provision had been inserted in the bill expressly reserving to the United States the right to exempt ships from tolls in the future. Wilson signed these revisions to the Panama Canal Act on 15 June 1914. Repealing the exemption meant that American ships would pay the same rate as ships of every other nation, at the time 90 cents per cargo ton.

== See also ==
- Hay–Bunau-Varilla Treaty
- Remon–Eisenhower Treaty
