= Remon–Eisenhower Treaty =

The Remon–Eisenhower Treaty, was a 1955 treaty between the United States and Panama that updated and amended the original Hay–Bunau-Varilla Treaty of 1903 for the Panama Canal and Panama Canal Zone.

== Sources ==
- Fitgerald, Luis I.; Historia de las Relaciones entre Panama y los Estados Unidos (in Spanish)
