= Hugh Lord McDonald =

Canadian politician

- Born: March 25, 1841; Cardigan River, Prince Edward Island, Canada
- Died: January 27, 1891 (aged 49)
- Occupations: Contractor, Politician

Hugh Lord McDonald (March 25, 1841 – January 27, 1891) was a contractor and political figure in Prince Edward Island in Canada. He represented 3rd Kings in the Legislative Assembly of Prince Edward Island from 1887 to 1890 as a Conservative member.

He was born in Cardigan River, Prince Edward Island, the son of Angus McDonald, a Scottish immigrant. In 1875, he married Anna Louisa Owen. He died in office in 1890.
