= Hyperdescent =

Assuming the socially higher ancestry

Hyperdescent is the practice of classifying a child of mixed race ancestry in the more socially dominant of the parents' races. Hyperdescent is the opposite of hypodescent (the practice of classifying a child of mixed race ancestry in the more socially subordinate parental race). Both hyperdescent and hypodescent vary from, and may not be mutually exclusive with, other methods of determining lineage, such as patrilineality and matrilineality.

== Examples ==
=== Australia ===
Until well into the 20th century, Australian state and federal governments engaged in a program of forcibly separating Aboriginal children with white ancestry from their Aboriginal families, and raising them in institutions that were intended to prepare them for white foster homes, jobs under white employers and/or marriage to whites.

This occurred according to theories of hyperdescent that were popular among white people. These ideas were not usually shared by Aboriginal people. White politicians and officials utilised pseudo-scientific theories that Aboriginal people were genetically and culturally inferior to whites, and were becoming extinct. These authorities believed that it was therefore improper for part-white children to live as Aboriginal people.

It was also widely believed that if Aboriginal people whose descendants had children with whites for several generations, successive generations of descendants would be less and less distinguishable from whites.

In Australia, while there were many racist laws intended to keep Aboriginal people in a socially inferior position, there were no anti-miscegenation laws and hence no barriers to marriages between Aboriginal and white partners.

=== Latin America ===
==== Brazil ====
Brazil is an example of a country with a history of European slavery of black Africans somewhat analogous to that of the United States of America. However, in the United States, hypodescent was applied, gradually classifying anyone with African American ancestry as black, specifically in one-drop rule laws passed in Virginia and other states in the 20th century. In Brazil, by contrast, people of mixed race who were fair-skinned or were educated and of higher economic classes were accepted into the elite. Thomas E. Skidmore, in Black into White: Race and Nationality in Brazilian Thought explains that many of the Brazilian elite encouraged a national process of "whitening" through miscegenation. Skidmore writes (p. 55):

In fact, miscegenation did not arouse the instinctive opposition of the white elite in Brazil. On the contrary, it was a well-recognized (and tacitly condoned) process by which a few mixed bloods (almost invariably light mulattoes) had risen to the top of the social and political hierarchy.

==== Hispanic America ====
Hyperdescent is the rule in the rest of Latin America as well. The mestizo populations of Latin America usually consider themselves to be of European culture rather than American Indian. This is also apparent in the United States, where the practice of hypodescent is the rule among the non-Hispanic population contrasting with hyperdescent among Hispanics. Nearly half of U.S. Hispanics called themselves "white" in the 2000 Census, along with 80% of the population of Puerto Rico. Non-Hispanics, on the other hand, if they are of mixed race, will usually call themselves white only if they are a small fraction (1/8 or 1/16) American Indian, but otherwise will claim being of mixed race or even of the minority race. In the 2000 Census, of 35,305,818 Hispanics, only 407,073 (or just over 1%) called themselves American Indian, and only 2,224,082 (just over 6%) claimed to be of mixed race, even though these Hispanic groups (such as Mexicans) are majority mestizo in their home countries.

About 41.2% of U.S. Hispanics identify as "Some other race" as of 2006, but government agencies which do not recognize "Some other race" (such as the FBI, the CDC, and the NCHS) include this group, and therefore over 90% of Hispanics, within the white population. In such cases, such as with the NCHS, separate statistics are often kept for "White" (which includes whites and over 90% of Hispanics) and "non-Hispanic white".

== See also ==
- Quadroon
- One-drop theory
- Racial segregation
- Racialism
- Racial purity
