= Frederick Peters =

Canadian politician

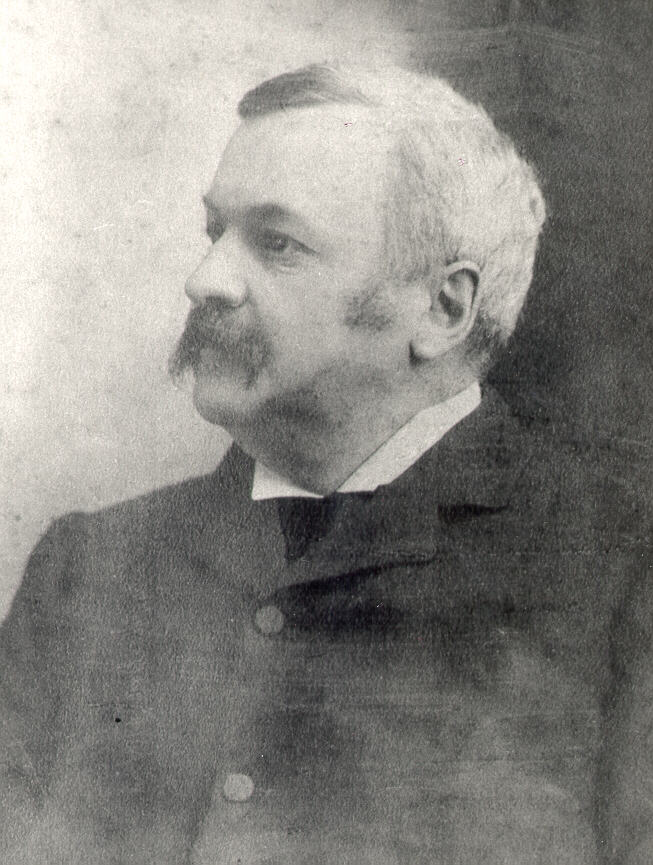

6th Premier of Prince Edward Island
- In office April 27, 1891 – October 27, 1897
- Monarch: Victoria
- Lieutenant Governor: Jedediah Slason Carvell, George William Howlan
- Preceded by: Neil McLeod
- Succeeded by: Alexander B. Warburton

Leader of the Prince Edward Island Liberal Party
- In office April 27, 1891 – October 27, 1897
- Preceded by: John Yeo
- Succeeded by: Alexander Warburton

Member of the General Assembly of Prince Edward Island for 3rd Queens
- In office January 30, 1890 – December 13, 1893 Serving with Donald Ferguson, James Cummiskey
- Preceded by: James Miller Sutherland
- Succeeded by: district abolished

MLA (Assemblyman) for 3rd Queens
- In office December 13, 1893 – December 12, 1900
- Preceded by: himself
- Succeeded by: Herbert James Palmer

Personal details
- Born: April 8, 1851 Charlottetown, Prince Edward Island Colony
- Died: July 29, 1919 (aged 68) Prince Rupert, British Columbia, Canada
- Party: Liberal
- Spouse: Bertha Susan Hamilton Gray (m. 1886)
- Relations: James Horsfield Peters (father)
- Children: 6, including Frederic Thornton Peters
- Education: King's College
- Occupation: lawyer
- Profession: Politician
- Cabinet: Attorney General (1891–1897)

Frederick Peters (April 8, 1851 – July 29, 1919) was a lawyer and Prince Edward Island politician, who served as the sixth premier of Prince Edward Island.

== Early life and career ==
Peters was born in Charlottetown and educated at King's College in Nova Scotia. Frederick's parents were Judge James Horsfield Peters (whose grandparents James Peters and Margaret Lester were United Empire Loyalists from New York) and Mary Cunard (eldest daughter of Sir Samuel Cunard). He went on to study law in England and was called to bar there in 1876. He was called to the bars of Prince Edward Island and Nova Scotia later that year and set up practice in Charlottetown.

== Political career ==
A Liberal, Peters won election to the House of Assembly in 1890. He was asked to form a government in 1891 after the Conservative government lost a motion of confidence in the house. The Peters government abolished both the Legislative Council and the House of Assembly and brought in a new Legislative Assembly to create a unicameral form of government. Peters served as Premier until resigning in 1897 to move to British Columbia though he retained his seat in the legislature until 1899 despite no longer residing in the province. In 1892, Premier Peters and his Cabinet (Executive Council) explained key articles of the "Amalgamation Bill," including the provision that thirty MLAs would comprise the new "Legislative Assembly," for Canadian Minister of Justice Sir John Sparrow David Thompson. Fifteen MLAs would be "elected by voters eligible to vote for the present legislative council, and the other half by voters eligible to vote for our present house of assembly...The bill leaves the districts as before with the exception that it was necessary to enlarge the bounds of Georgetown district in King's county. This district only containing about 200 voters, and it not being deemed fair to allow so small a constituency to exist, in face of the fact that several other constituencies contained as many as 2000 voters. In order to do this change had to be made in three of the constituencies in King's county." The "Amalgamation Bill" abolished the Legislative Council, but added two representatives to the total number of MLAs voted into the legislature by "voters who possess a certain real property qualification." The bill further reduced thirty delegates elected to the legislature by a limited qualification that "almost amounts to manhood suffrage" to fifteen MLAs. In a demarcation of provincial from Dominion jurisdiction, Prince Edward Island "persons in the permanent employ of the various departments of the Dominion government service" could not vote for the "Legislative Assembly." The preamble and section 179 stipulated that voting qualifications "should not be altered in one particular, namely, the qualification of the voters for the property candidates or council men, or the proportionate number of councillors in the new house, without a two-third vote of the new house." The Liberal petitioners did not explicitly engage with Conservative concerns that voters without "real property qualification" could only vote for fifteen out of the thirty MLAs, while voters with "real property" could vote for all thirty delegates. Sir Thompson, a Roman Catholic and nominee for Conservative Prime Minister of Canada, grew leery of a Protestant backlash against the Dominion Conservative Party. He counseled the Governor General to "take no action" until passage of the provincial bill. He then counseled "approval" of the resulting statute.

== Legal career in British Columbia ==
Peters was Chief Counsel for the Great Britain in the Behring Sea Claims Commission, 1896–1897. His associate counsel was Sir Charles Hibbert Tupper, who as Minister of Fisheries was involved in the earlier Bering Sea Arbitration between Great Britain and the United States. The commission held hearings in Victoria, British Columbia from November 23, 1896 to February 2, 1897. This close working partnership, as well as the developing economic conditions on the west coast – particularly with the stampede to the Klondike Gold Rush – encouraged both men to resign their political and legal careers in the Maritimes and begin a joint legal practice in Victoria. Peters and Tupper arrived in Victoria on November 11, 1897. By July 1898 they had opened two partnerships, Tupper, Peters and Potts in Victoria and Tupper, Peters and Gilmour in Vancouver.

In 1911 Frederick Peters left his legal practice and moved north to become City Solicitor for the City of Prince Rupert, British Columbia. He arrived in the north coast town on May 17, 1911, when it was barely one year old (having been incorporated in March 1910). Peters' legal and political experience were important as he helped the community make the transition from a frontier company town to port city. He remained as City Solicitor until his death in 1919.

== Personal life ==
Peters married Roberta Hamilton Susan Gray (daughter of P.E.I. Father of Confederation John Hamilton Gray) in Charlottetown in 1886. They had six children: Mary Helen Peters (1887–1976), Frederic Thornton Peters (1889–1942), John Francklyn Peters (1892–1915), Gerald Hamilton Peters (1894–1916), Noel Quintan Peters (1894–1964) and Violet Avis Peters (1899–1905).

Daughter Violet died in "a fireplace accident" at their home in Oak Bay, British Columbia in 1905. She was buried in Ross Bay Cemetery. When Frederick Peters died in 1919, his remains were brought to Victoria and he was buried beside his daughter. Following his death, Roberta Peters lived with her daughter Mary Dewdney in New Denver, British Columbia. She died in nearby Nelson in 1946.

Two sons, John Francklyn Peters and Gerald Hamilton Peters, died in action in World War I. Another son, Frederic Thornton Peters, died in November 1942 five days after action in the Allied invasion of Oran for which he received the Victoria Cross and the U.S. Distinguished Service Cross.

Frederick's brother, Arthur Peters, was also active in politics, serving as premier of Prince Edward Island from 1901 to 1908. His cousin Lt. Col. James Peters also had a distinguished military career and was District Officer Commanding in BC, based at Esquimalt, British Columbia.
