= James Birch (politician) =

Canadian politician

1st Prince in the Legislative Assembly of Prince Edward Island
- In office 1897–1900

Personal details
- Born: July 29, 1849 Port Hill, Prince Edward Island
- Died: December 6, 1941 (aged 92)
- Occupation: Merchant, Horse breeder and Political figure

James Edward Birch (July 29, 1849 – December 6, 1941) was a merchant, horse breeder and political figure in Prince Edward Island. He represented 1st Prince in the Legislative Assembly of Prince Edward Island from 1897 to 1900 as a Liberal member.

He was born in Port Hill, Prince Edward Island, the son of Thomas Birch, an Irish immigrant. He worked as a clerk for James and John Yeo for thirteen years. He then went to Boston for several months and returned to work for the Yeos as bookkeeper for three more years. After working in Charlottetown and Alberton, he entered the dry goods there with a partner before opening his own general store in Alberton. He helped organize a Board of Trade in Alberton in 1903 and served as its secretary.

Birch supported the development of the Prince Edward Island Railway, opposed Confederation and was an active member in a temperance organization. Besides breeding and training horses, Birch also operated, with Doctor McLean, a trotting park at Alberton and he also practiced as a veterinary surgeon. After his term in the provincial assembly, he was unsuccessful in a bid for reelection in 1900 and subsequently retired from politics. In 1901, he married Isabella Currie. Birch was also a member of the Masonic lodge at Charlottetown and of the Independent Order of Foresters.

He died in Alberton at the age of 92.
