= Patrick Blake (Canadian politician) =

Canadian politician

Represented 5th Queens in the Legislative Assembly of Prince Edward Island
- In office 1883–1891

Served on Charlottetown City Council
- In office 1880–1882

Speaker of the Legislative Assembly of Prince Edward Island
- In office 1890–1891

Personal details
- Born: March 6, 1846 Charlottetown
- Died: November 20, 1909 (aged 63)
- Occupation: Businessman and Politicians

Patrick Blake (March 6, 1846 – November 20, 1909) was a businessman and politician in Prince Edward Island, Canada. He represented 5th Queens in the Legislative Assembly of Prince Edward Island from 1883 to 1891 as a Conservative member.

He was born in Charlottetown as the son of John Blake, an Irish immigrant. With his brother Maurice, he became a partner in his father's butchering business, later expanding into exporting cattle and wholesale. Blake served on Charlottetown City Council from 1880 to 1882. Blake was speaker for the provincial assembly from 1890 to 1891. He was opposed to Confederation but ran unsuccessfully for a seat in the House of Commons in 1891. Blake was a judge and later director for the provincial agricultural exhibition. He helped reorganize the Charlottetown Board of Trade and served as president from 1893 to 1896. He set up business in Sydney, Nova Scotia in 1901 but returned to the island shortly before his death in Charlottetown in 1909.
