= David Rogers (Canadian politician) =

Canadian politician

David Rogers (November 15, 1829 – October 22, 1909) was a merchant, shipbuilder and politician on Prince Edward Island. He represented 5th Prince in the Legislative Assembly of Prince Edward Island from 1890 to 1893 as a Conservative.

He was born in Carmarthenshire, Wales, the son of Joseph Rogers and Margaret James, and came to the island with his parents in 1831. Rogers was a justice of the peace and served as chairman of the town council for Summerside. Rogers worked for merchant and shipbuilder James Colledge Pope, later becoming a partner and then purchasing Pope's business. He was married twice: to Annie Hester Gourlie in 1861 and to Rosina Gertrude Brine in 1886. Rogers served as a member of the province's Executive Council. He was defeated when he ran for reelection in 1893. Rogers died in Summerside at the age of 79.

His brother Benjamin also served in the provincial assembly and became Lieutenant Governor for the province.
