= Big stick ideology =

American political catchphrase

Big Stick ideology
- 1901–1909
Manifest destiny	Dollar diplomacy
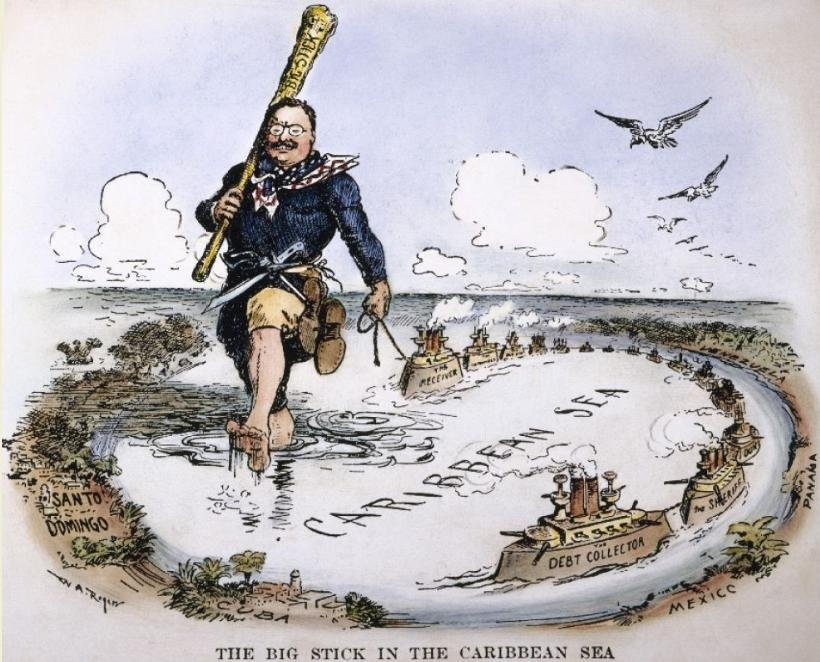
- The Big Stick in the Caribbean Sea, a 1904 political cartoon by William Allen Rogers
- Duration: 8 years
- Location: The Americas (principally the Caribbean and Latin America)
- Including: Roosevelt Corollary (1904) Relation to doctrine: Extension / radical reinterpretation of the Monroe Doctrine
- President: Theodore Roosevelt
- Key events: Venezuelan crisis of 1902–1903; Construction of the Panama Canal (begun 1904)

Big stick ideology (also known as big stick diplomacy and big stick philosophy) was a political approach used by the 26th president of the United States, Theodore Roosevelt. The terms are derived from an aphorism which Roosevelt often said: "speak softly and carry a big stick; you will go far".

The term "big stick" was used by the contemporary American press and modern historians to describe the foreign policy of Roosevelt's administration, which he described as "the exercise of intelligent forethought and of decisive action sufficiently far in advance of any likely crisis".

As practiced by Roosevelt, big stick diplomacy had five components. First, it was essential to possess serious military capability that would force the adversary to pay close attention. At the time that meant a world-class navy. The other qualities were to act justly toward other nations, never to bluff, to strike only when prepared to strike hard, and to be willing to allow the adversary to save face in defeat.

== Background ==
The letter in which Roosevelt first used his now-famous phrase (26 January 1900)

The term derives from the phrase, Speak softly and carry a big stick; you will go far, which Roosevelt claimed was a West African proverb, although there is little evidence for that. Roosevelt (at the time Governor of New York), in a bout of happiness after forcing New York's Republican committee to pull support away from a corrupt financial adviser, wrote to Henry L. Sprague a letter dated January 26, 1900, in which he says:

I have always been fond of the West African proverb: "Speak softly and carry a big stick; you will go far."

He first publicly uttered the phrase in March of the same year in relation to his reputation for holding state Senators accountable. Roosevelt added clarification to the meaning of the saying.

If you simply speak softly the other man will bully you. If you leave your stick at home you will find the other man did not. If you carry the stick only and forget to speak softly in nine cases out of ten, the other man will have a bigger stick.

Roosevelt would go on to be elected vice president later that year and subsequently used the aphorism in an address to the Minnesota State Fair entitled "National Duties" on September 2, 1901:

A good many of you are probably acquainted with the old proverb: "Speak softly and carry a big stick—you will go far."

== Usage ==
Although it had been used before his presidency, Roosevelt used military muscle several times throughout his two terms with a more subtle touch to complement his diplomatic policies and enforcing the Monroe Doctrine throughout multiple interventions in Latin America. This included the Great White Fleet, 16 battleships which peacefully circumnavigated the globe as an illustration of United States's rising yet neutral prestige under Roosevelt's direction.

=== Latin America ===
==== Venezuelan Affair (1902) and the Roosevelt Corollary ====
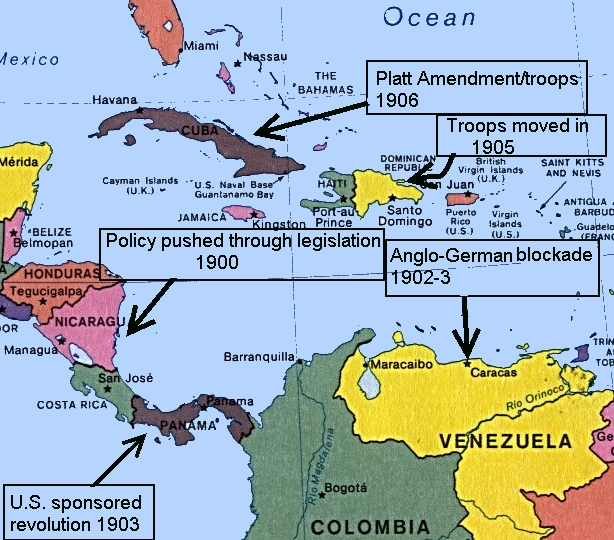
Some American uses of the "big stick" in Middle America, 1900–1906.

In the early 20th century, Venezuela was receiving complaints from Britain and Germany about "acts of violence against the liberty of British subjects and the massive capture of British vessels" who were from the UK and the lack of Venezuelan initiative to pay off long-standing debts. After the Royal Navy and Imperial German Navy took naval action with a blockade on Venezuela (1902–1903), Roosevelt denounced the blockade. The blockade provided the initial basis of the Roosevelt Corollary to the Monroe Doctrine.

In 1904, although he had mentioned the basis of his idea beforehand in private letters, Roosevelt officially announced the corollary, stating that he only wanted the "other republics on this continent" to be "happy and prosperous". For that goal to be met, the corollary required that they "maintain order within their borders and behave with a just obligation toward outsiders".

Most historians, such as one of Roosevelt's many biographers Howard K. Beale, have summarized that the corollary was influenced by Roosevelt's personal beliefs as well as his connections to foreign bondholders. The U.S. public was "tense" during the two-month blockade; Roosevelt asked Britain and Germany to pull out their forces from the area. During the requests for the blockade's end, Roosevelt stationed naval forces in Cuba, to ensure "the respect of Monroe doctrine" and the compliance of the parties in question. The doctrine was never ratified by the senate or brought up for a vote to the American public. Roosevelt's declaration was the first of many presidential decrees in the 20th century that were never ratified.

==== Canal diplomacy ====
The U.S. used the "big stick" during "Canal Diplomacy", the diplomatic actions of the U.S. during the pursuit of a canal across Central America. Both Nicaragua and Panama featured canal related incidents of big stick diplomacy.

===== Proposed construction of the Nicaragua Canal =====
In 1901, Secretary of State John Hay pressed the Nicaraguan government for approval of a canal. Nicaragua would receive $1.5 million in ratification, $100,000 annually, and the U.S. would "provide sovereignty, independence, and territorial integrity". Nicaragua then returned the contract draft with a change; they wished to receive, instead of an annual $100,000, $6 million in ratification. The U.S. accepted the deal, but after Congress approved the contract, a problem of court jurisdiction came up. The U.S. did not have legal jurisdiction in the land of the future canal. This problem was on the verge of correction until pro-Panama representatives posed problems for Nicaragua; the current leader (General José Santos Zelaya) did not cause problems, from the outlook of U.S. interests.

===== Construction of the Panama Canal =====
In 1899, the Isthmian Canal Commission was set up to determine which site would be best for the canal (Nicaragua or Panama) and then to oversee construction. After Nicaragua was ruled out, Panama was the obvious choice. A few problems had arisen, however. With the U.S.'s solidified interests in Panama (then a small portion of Colombia), both Colombia and the French company that was to provide the construction materials raised their prices. The U.S., refusing to pay the higher-than-expected fees, "engineered a revolution" in Colombia. On November 3, 1903, Panama (with the support of the United States Navy) revolted against Colombia. Panama became a new republic, receiving $10 million from the U.S. alone. Panama also gained an annual payment of $250,000 and guarantees of independence. The U.S. gained the rights to the canal strip "in perpetuity". Roosevelt later said that he "took the Canal, and let Congress debate". After Colombia lost Panama, they tried to appeal to the U.S. by the reconsidering of treaties and even naming Panama City the capital of Colombia.

==== Cuba ====
The U.S. after the Spanish–American War had many expansionists who wanted to annex Cuba. Many people felt that a foreign power (outside of the U.S.) would control a portion of Cuba, thus the U.S. could not continue with its interests in Cuba. Although many advocated annexation, this was prevented by the Teller Amendment, which states "hereby disclaims any disposition of intention to exercise sovereignty, jurisdiction, or control over said island except for pacification thereof, and asserts its determination, when that is accomplished, to leave the government and control of the island to its people". When summarized, this could mean that the U.S. would not interfere with Cuba and its peoples. The expansionists argued that the Teller Amendment was created "ignorant of actual conditions", which released the U.S. from its obligation. Following the debate surrounding the Teller Amendment, the Platt Amendment took effect. The Platt Amendment (the name is a misnomer; the Platt Amendment is actually a rider to the Army Appropriation Act of 1901) was accepted by Cuba in late 1901, after "strong pressure" from Washington. The Platt Amendment is summarized by Thomas A. Bailey in Diplomatic History of the American People:

1. Cuba was not to make decisions impairing her independence or to permit a foreign power [e.g., Germany] to secure lodgment in control over the island.
2. Cuba pledged herself not to incur an indebtedness beyond her means [it might result in foreign intervention].
3. The United States was at liberty to intervene for the purpose of preserving order and maintaining Cuban independence.
4. Cuba would agree to an American-sponsored sanitation program [aimed largely at yellow fever].
5. Cuba would agree to sell or lease to the United States sites for naval or coaling stations [Guantánamo became the principal base].

With the Platt Amendment in place, Roosevelt pulled the troops out of Cuba. A year later, Roosevelt wrote:

Just at the moment I am so angry with that infernal little Cuban republic that I would like to wipe its people off the face of the earth. All that we wanted from them was that they would behave themselves and be prosperous and happy so that we would not have to interfere.

— Theodore Roosevelt

== See also ==
- Carrot and stick
- History of U.S. foreign policy, 1897–1913
- Pax Americana
- Peace through strength
- Throffer
