= Dollar diplomacy =

American foreign policy

- 1909–1913
Roosevelt Corollary	Good neighbor policy
- William Howard Taft, who designed the policy of substituting "dollars for bullets".
- Location: United States, Latin America, East Asia
- Leader: Philander C. Knox
- President: William Howard Taft
- Key events: Hukuang railway loan (1911); Intervention in Nicaragua (1912); US banking loans to Mexico

Dollar diplomacy of the United States, particularly during the presidency of William Howard Taft (1909–1913) was a form of American foreign policy to minimize the use or threat of military force and instead further its aims in Latin America and East Asia through the use of its economic power by guaranteeing loans made to foreign countries. In his message to Congress on 3 December 1912, Taft summarized the policy of Dollar diplomacy:

The diplomacy of the present administration has sought to respond to modern ideas of commercial intercourse. This policy has been characterized as substituting dollars for bullets. It is one that appeals alike to idealistic humanitarian sentiments, to the dictates of sound policy and strategy, and to legitimate commercial aims.

Dollar diplomacy was not new, as the use of diplomacy to promote commercial interest dates from the early years of the Republic. However, under Taft's presidency, the State Department was more active than ever in encouraging and supporting American bankers and industrialists in securing new opportunities abroad.

The concept is relevant to both Liberia, where American loans were given in 1913, and Latin America. Latin Americans tend to use the term "dollar diplomacy" disparagingly to show their disapproval of the role that the U.S. government and U.S. corporations have played in using economic, diplomatic and military power to open up foreign markets. When Woodrow Wilson became president in March 1913, he immediately canceled all support for Dollar diplomacy. Historians agree that Taft's Dollar diplomacy was a failure everywhere. In the Far East, it alienated Japan and Russia and created a deep suspicion among the other powers hostile to American motives.

== Overview ==
From 1909 to 1913, President William Howard Taft and Secretary of State Philander C. Knox followed a foreign policy characterized as "dollar diplomacy". It was a policy whereby American influence would be exerted primarily by American banks and financial interests, supported in part by diplomats. Taft shared the view held by Knox (a corporate lawyer who was instrumental in founding the giant conglomerate U.S. Steel) that the goal of diplomacy should be to create stability abroad and through this stability promote American commercial interests. Knox felt that not only was the goal of diplomacy to improve financial opportunities, but also to use private capital to further U.S. interests overseas. "Dollar diplomacy" was evident in extensive U.S. interventions in Venezuela, Cuba, and Central America, especially in measures undertaken to safeguard American financial interests and from the United States government in the region. In China, Knox secured the entry of an American banking conglomerate, headed by J.P. Morgan, into a European-financed consortium financing the construction of a railway from Huguang to Canton. In spite of successes, "dollar diplomacy" failed to counteract economic instability and the tide of revolution in places like Mexico, the Dominican Republic, Nicaragua, and China.

The US Government felt obligated, through dollar diplomacy, to uphold economic and political stability. Taft's dollar diplomacy not only allowed the United States to gain financially from countries but also restrained other foreign countries from reaping any sort of financial gain. Consequently, when the United States benefited from other countries, other world powers could not reap those same benefits. Overall the "dollar diplomacy" was to encourage and protect trade within Latin America and Asia. Taft maintained an activist approach to foreign policy. On one hand, he was the initiator of what became known as dollar diplomacy, in which the United States used its military might to promote American business interests abroad. Taft defended his dollar diplomacy as an extension of the Monroe Doctrine. Taft was a major supporter of arbitration as the most viable method of settling international disputes. Quickly becoming a world power, America sought to further her influence abroad. President Taft realized that by instituting dollar diplomacy, he would harm the financial interests of other countries, thereby benefiting the United States greatly.

Thomas A. Bailey, a professor of history at Stanford University has stated that dollar diplomacy was designed to make both people in foreign lands and the American investors prosper.

== Americas ==
Outgoing President Theodore Roosevelt laid the foundation for this approach in 1904 with his Roosevelt Corollary to the Monroe Doctrine (under which United States Marines were frequently sent to Central America) maintaining that if any nation in the Western Hemisphere appeared politically and financially unstable enough to be vulnerable to European control, the United States had the right and obligation to intervene. Taft continued and expanded this policy, starting in Central America, where he justified it as a means to protect the Panama Canal. In March 1909, he attempted unsuccessfully to establish control over Honduras by buying up its debt to British bankers.

Another dangerous new trouble spot was the revolution-riddled Caribbean—now largely dominated by U.S. interests. Hoping to head off trouble, Washington urged U.S. bankers to pump dollars into the financial vacuum in Honduras and Haiti to keep out foreign funds. The United States would not permit foreign nations to intervene, and consequently felt obligated to prevent economic and political instability. The State Department persuaded four U.S. banks to refinance Haiti's national debt, setting the stage for further intervention in the future.

As historian Peter James Hudson points out, the United States' control of fiscal matters in the Dominican Republic served as an example of dollar diplomacy in other parts of the Caribbean and Central America. This setup involved American oversight of customs revenue collection and distribution, along with the threat of military force if the Dominican Republic failed to meet its obligations. The American financier Samuel M. Jarvis sought access to the government's accounts and commercial concessions through the Banco Nacional de Santo Domingo, a bank established under Dominican law and opened in January 1912. The bank then competed against the National City Bank of New York and the Guaranty Trust Company for a $1.5 million loan for the Dominican government. The National City Bank, whose involvement had been promoted by the U.S. State Department, won the contract in January 1913. The loan was secured by a second mortgage on the Dominican Republic's customs revenues, with monthly interest and principal repayments of $30,000. The organizers of the Banco Nacional challenged the award, claiming that there had been irregularities both in the bidding process and in the loan terms, but Secretary of State Philander C. Knox dismissed their complaints and maintained the decision in February 1913.

== Failure in East Asia ==
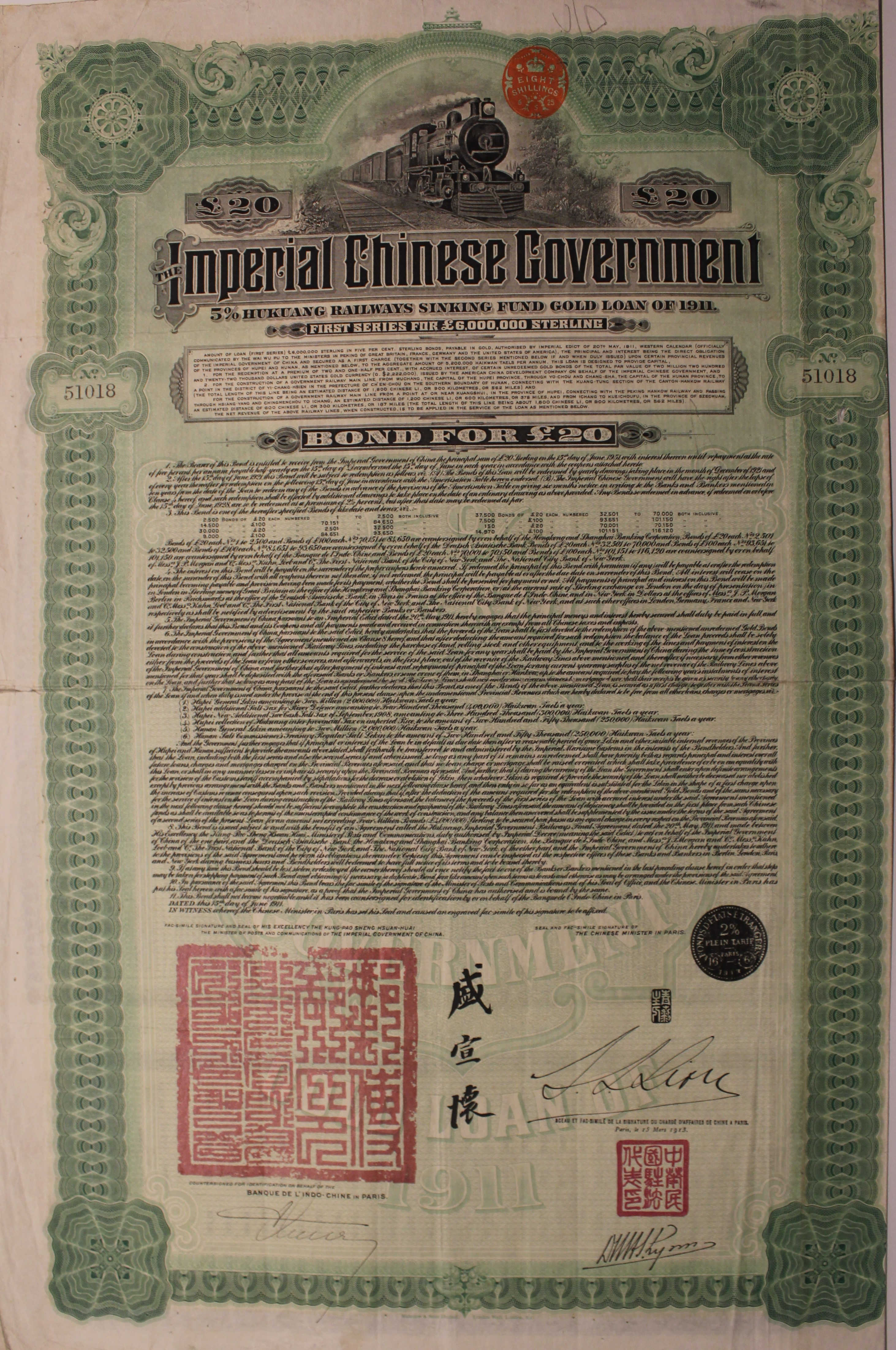
Hukuang loan, issued 15. June 1911

In East Asia, dollar diplomacy was the policy of the Taft administration to use American banking power to create a tangible American interest in China that would limit the scope of the other powers, increase the opportunity for American trade and investment, and help maintain the Open Door policy of trading opportunities of all nations. Whereas Theodore Roosevelt wanted to conciliate Japan and help it neutralize Russia, Taft and his Secretary of State Philander Knox ignored Roosevelt's policy and his advice. Dollar diplomacy was based on the false assumption that American financial interests could mobilize their potential power, and wanted to do so in East Asia. However, the American financial system was not geared to handle international finance, such as loans and large investments, and had to depend primarily on London. The British also wanted an open door in China but were not prepared to support American financial maneuvers. Finally, the other powers held territorial interests, including naval bases and designated geographical areas which they dominated inside China, while the United States refused anything of the kind. Bankers were reluctant, but Taft and Knox kept pushing them. Most efforts were failures until finally, the United States forced its way into the Hukuang international railway loan. The loan was finally made by the so-called China Consortium in 1911 and helped spark a widespread "Railway Protection Movement" revolt against foreign investment that overthrew the Chinese government. The bonds caused no end of disappointment and trouble. As late as 1983, over 300 American investors tried, unsuccessfully, to force the government of China to redeem the worthless Hukuang bonds. When Woodrow Wilson became president in March 1913, he immediately canceled all support for Dollar diplomacy. Historians agree that Taft's Dollar diplomacy was a failure everywhere, In the Far East alienated Japan and Russia, and created a deep suspicion among the other powers hostile to American motives.

== See also ==
- American imperialism
- Debt-trap diplomacy
- History of U.S. foreign policy, 1897–1913
- New Imperialism

== Sources ==
- "Dollar Diplomacy." Encyclopædia Britannica. 2019. Encyclopædia Britannica Online. 24 October 2019.
- "Dollar Diplomacy, 1909–1913" U.S. Department of State. 11 March 2008.
