= Benjamin Fordham =

American political scientist

- Born: Houston, Texas

Education
- Education: UNC Chapel Hill; Georgetown University

Philosophical work
- Institutions: Binghamton University; SUNY Albany
- Main interests: US foreign policy

Benjamin O. Fordham is a political scientist at Binghamton University.

== Education ==
Benjamin Fordham graduated from Edmund A. Walsh School of Foreign Service in Georgetown University in 1988 with a B.S. in foreign service. He received Masters in Government in University of North Carolina at Chapel Hill in 1990 and subsequently Ph.D. in 1994.

== Career ==
Fordham was a postdoctoral fellow in Center of International Studies, a research center in Princeton University in 1995. He joined SUNY Albany in 1996 as an assistant professor in political science. He served as visiting associate professor in Harvard University in 2002. He left Albany in 2004 and now teaches in Binghamton University. He was a Henry Alfred Kissinger Scholar in Foreign Policy and International Relations in the John W. Kluge Center, Library of Congress in 2010.

== Works ==
- Building the Cold War Consensus: The Political Economy of U.S. National Security Policy, 1949-1951. University of Michigan Press. 1998. ISBN 0-472-10887-5.
