= Modern liberalism in the United States =

Political and social ideology

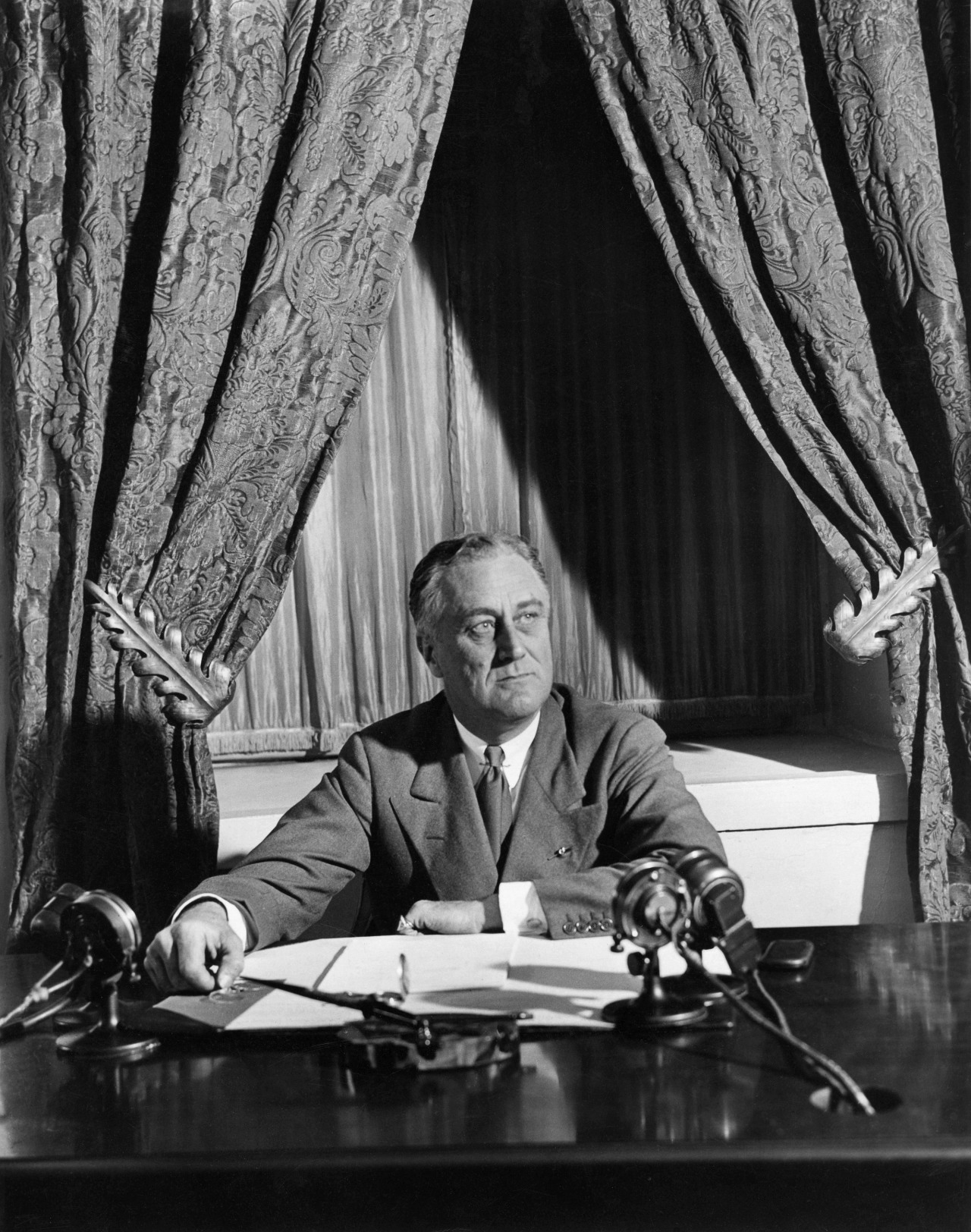
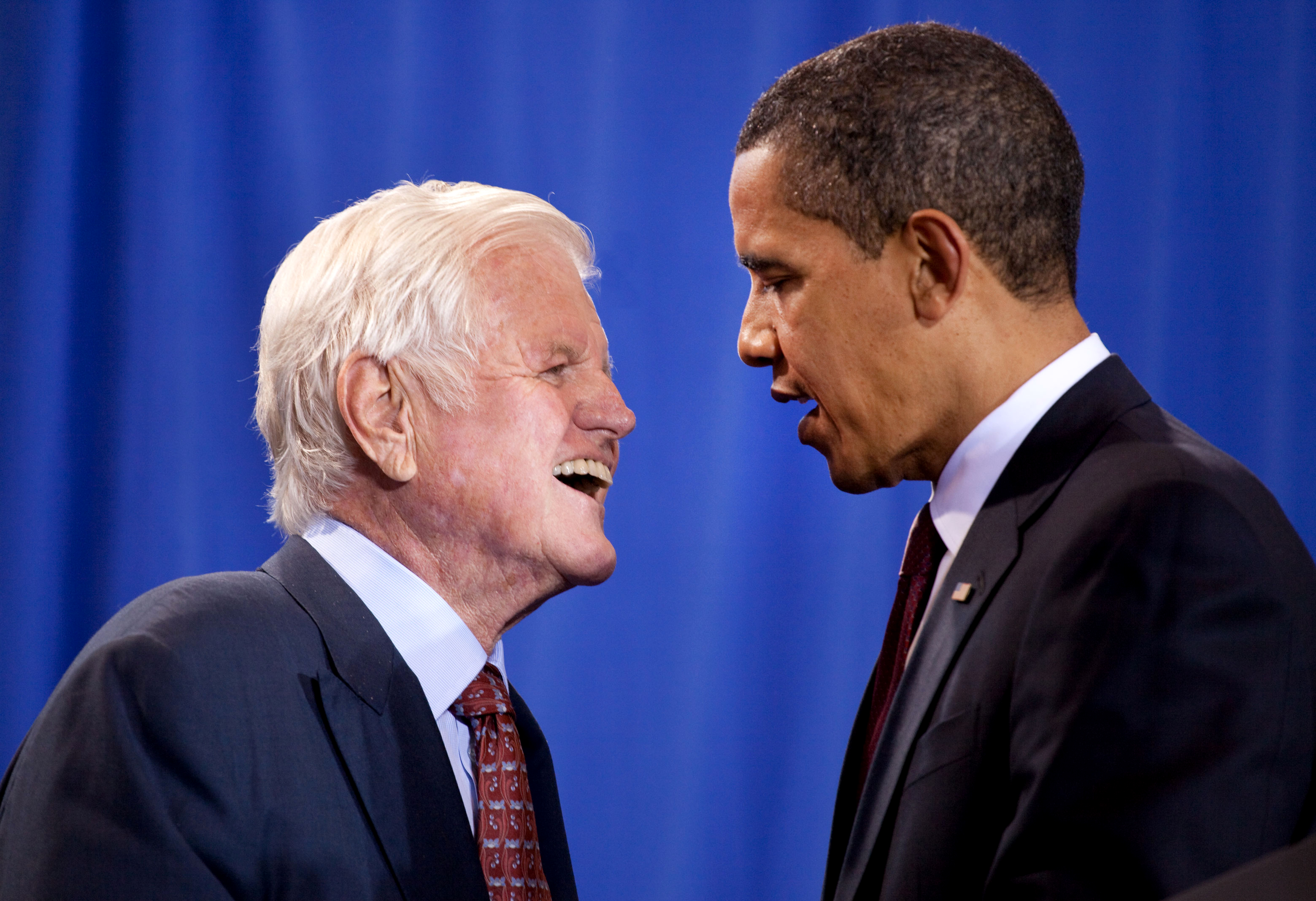
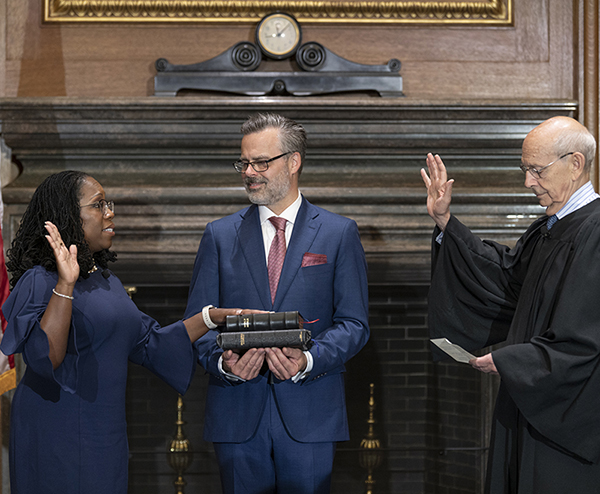
Clockwise from top:
President Franklin D. Roosevelt in 1933; President John F. Kennedy conferring with former President Harry S. Truman in the Oval Office; Justice Stephen Breyer administering the Judicial Oath to Ketanji Brown Jackson as Associate Justice of the United States Supreme Court in 2022; U.S. Senator Ted Kennedy with President Barack Obama in 2009

Modern liberalism in the United States emerged with Franklin D. Roosevelt's New Deal in the 1930s and is the prevailing version of liberalism in the country. It is most synonymous with the ideology known as social liberalism in much of the world, combining in the U.S. version elements of cultural liberalism, American progressivism, civil liberty and social equality with support for social justice and a mixed economy. Modern liberalism was historically one of two major political ideologies in the United States, with the other being conservatism. Writing in 1993, American academic writer Ian Adams argued all major U.S. parties up to that point were "liberal and always have been. Essentially they espouse classical liberalism, that is a form of democratized Whig constitutionalism plus the free market. The point of difference comes with the influence of social liberalism."

Economically, modern liberalism embraces a role for government to protect against market failures, ensure competition and prevent corporate monopolies, and supports labor rights through the strengthening of public- and private-sector labor unions, collective bargaining, unemployment insurance and minimum wage laws. Its fiscal policy supports broad expansions of the social safety net through the proposition of a government role in administering universal healthcare and controlling the costs of health services, paid leave, universal child care, tuition-free public or community college, workers compensation and social insurance, while simultaneously promoting income-proportional progressive income taxation and other tax reform policies to finance social programs, public works, and reduce government deficits. It calls for active government involvement in other social and economic matters such as reducing economic inequality, expanding access to public education and healthcare, and protection of the shared natural environment, in large part on the contention that advances in those areas create a thriving economy in the long run. Modern liberalism was formed in the 20th century in response to the Great Depression. Major examples of modern liberal policy programs include the New Deal, the Fair Deal, the New Frontier, the Great Society, the Affordable Care Act, and the Build Back Better Plan.

In the first half of the 20th century, both major American parties shared influential conservative and liberal wings. The conservative northern Republicans and Southern Democrats formed the conservative coalition, which mostly dominated the U.S. Congress from the late 1930s until the Johnson administration. Beginning in the Great Depression era, northern Democrats increasingly supported civil rights and organized labor, while voters and politicians in the formerly Solid South opposed them from within the Democratic Party. Following the passage of the Civil Rights Act of 1964, conservative Democrats began an exodus from the party, and supported Republican candidate Richard Nixon in 1968.

In the 21st century, urban areas have become more liberal, and rural areas have become conservative. (see Urban–rural political divide)

== Overview ==
The modern liberal philosophy strongly endorses public spending on programs such as education, health care, and welfare. Important social issues during the 21st century include social justice, economic inequality (wealth and income), voting rights for minorities, affirmative action, reproductive and other women's rights, support for LGBT rights, and immigration reform.

Modern liberalism took shape during the 20th century, with roots in Theodore Roosevelt's Square Deal and New Nationalism, Woodrow Wilson's New Freedom, Franklin D. Roosevelt's New Deal, Harry S. Truman's Fair Deal, John F. Kennedy's New Frontier and Lyndon B. Johnson's Great Society. Modern liberals oppose conservatives on most but not all issues. Although historically related to social liberalism and progressivism, the current relationship between liberal and progressive viewpoints is debated. Modern liberalism is typically associated with the Democratic Party while modern conservatism is typically associated with the Republican Party.

In 1941, Franklin D. Roosevelt defined a liberal party in the following terms:

The liberal party believes that, as new conditions and problems arise beyond the power of men and women to meet as individuals, it becomes the duty of Government itself to find new remedies with which to meet them. The liberal party insists that the Government has the definite duty to use all its power and resources to meet new social problems with new social controls—to ensure to the average person the right to his own economic and political life, liberty, and the pursuit of happiness.

In 1960, John F. Kennedy defined a liberal as follows:

What do our opponents mean when they apply to us the label, "Liberal"? If by "Liberal" they mean, as they want people to believe, someone who is soft in his policies abroad, who is against local government, and who is unconcerned with the taxpayer's dollar, then the record of this party and its members demonstrate that we are not that kind of "Liberal." But, if by a "Liberal," they mean someone who looks ahead and not behind, someone who welcomes new ideas without rigid reactions, someone who cares about the welfare of the people—their health, their housing, their schools, their jobs, their civil rights, and their civil liberties—someone who believes that we can break through the stalemate and suspicions that grip us in our policies abroad, if that is what they mean by a "Liberal," then I'm proud to say that I'm a "Liberal."

Keynesian economic theory has played an important role in the economic philosophy of modern liberals. Modern liberals generally believe that national prosperity requires government management of the macroeconomy to keep unemployment low, inflation in check and growth high. They also value institutions that defend against economic inequality. In The Conscience of a Liberal, Paul Krugman writes: "I believe in a relatively equal society, supported by institutions that limit extremes of wealth and poverty. I believe in democracy, civil liberties, and the rule of law. That makes me a liberal, and I'm proud of it". Modern liberals often point to the widespread prosperity enjoyed under a mixed economy in the years since World War II. They believe liberty exists when access to necessities like health care and economic opportunity are available to all and they champion the protection of the environment.

=== American versus European usage of liberalism ===
Colloquially, liberalism is used differently, in its primary use in different countries. In the United States the general term liberalism almost always refers to modern liberalism. There are some parties in Europe which nominally appeal to social liberalism, with the Beveridge Group faction within the Liberal Democrats, the Danish Social Liberal Party, the Democratic Movement, and the Italian Republican Party. One of the greatest contrasts is between the usage in the United States and usage in Europe and Latin America. According to Arthur M. Schlesinger Jr. (writing in 1956), "[l]iberalism in the American usage has little in common with the word as used in the politics of any European country, save possibly Britain." In Europe, liberalism usually means what is sometimes called economic liberalism or classical liberalism, a commitment to limited government, laissez-faire economics. This classical liberalism sometimes more closely corresponds to the American definition of libertarianism or, in an economic context, fiscal conservatism, although some distinguish between classical liberalism and libertarianism.

=== Demographics of American liberals ===
Percent of self-identified liberals by state in 2018, according to a Gallup poll: 32% and above 28–31% 24–27% 20–23% 16–19% 15% and under

A 2005 Pew Research Center study found that liberals were the most educated ideological demographic and were tied with the conservative sub-group of the enterprisers for the most affluent group. Of those who identified as liberal, 49% were college graduates and 41% had household incomes exceeding $75,000, compared to 27% and 28% as the national average, respectively. Liberalism has become the dominant political ideology in academia, with 44–62% identifying as liberal, depending on the exact wording of the survey. This compares with 40–46% liberal identification in surveys from 1969 to 1984. The social sciences and humanities were most liberal whereas business and engineering departments were the least liberal; even in the business departments, however, liberals outnumbered conservatives by two to one. This feeds the common question of whether liberals are on average more educated than conservatives, their political counterparts. Two Zogby surveys from 2008 and 2010 affirm that self-identified liberals tend to go to college more than self-identified conservatives. Polls have found that young Americans are considerably more liberal than the general population. As of 2009, 30% of the 18–29 cohort was liberal. In 2011, this had changed to 28%, with moderates picking up the two percent.

A 2015 Gallup poll found that socially liberal views have consistently been on the rise in the United States since 1999. As of 2015, there is a roughly equal number of socially liberal Americans and socially conservative Americans (31% each) and the socially liberal trend continues to rise. In early 2016, Gallup found that more Americans identified as ideologically conservative (37%) or moderate (35%) rather than liberal (24%), but that liberalism has slowly been gaining ground since 1992, standing at a 24-year high.

From 2016 to 2024 liberal identification remained around 25% in Gallup polling, though in 2025 liberal identification spiked to 28%, with 35% identifying as conservative and 33% identifying as moderate.

==== Geography ====
The Northeast, Great Lakes region, parts of the Southwest, and the West Coast are the main liberal strongholds; the fraction of Massachusetts self-identified conservatives being as low as 21%. Voters in the urban cores of large metropolitan areas tend to be more liberal and Democratic. There is a clear urban–rural political divide within and among states.

== History ==
Historian and advocate of liberalism Arthur M. Schlesinger Jr. had explored in-depth the heritage of Jacksonian democracy in its influence on Franklin D. Roosevelt. Robert V. Remini, the biographer of Andrew Jackson, also said:

Jacksonian Democracy, then, stretches the concept of democracy about as far as it can go and still remain workable. ... As such it has inspired much of the dynamic and dramatic events of the nineteenth and twentieth centuries in American history—Populism, Progressivism, the New and Fair Deals, and the programs of the New Frontier and Great Society to mention the most obvious.

In 1956, Schlesinger said that liberalism in the United States includes both a laissez-faire form and a government intervention form. He holds that liberalism in the United States is aimed toward achieving equality of opportunity for all, but it is the means of achieving this that changes depending on the circumstances. He says that the "process of redefining liberalism in terms of the social needs of the 20th century was conducted by Theodore Roosevelt and his New Nationalism, Woodrow Wilson and his New Freedom, and Franklin D. Roosevelt and his New Deal. Out of these three reform periods there emerged the conception of a social welfare state, in which the national government had the express obligation to maintain high levels of employment in the economy, to supervise standards of life and labor, to regulate the methods of business competition, and to establish comprehensive patterns of social security". Some make the distinction between American classical liberalism and the new liberalism, better known as modern liberalism.

Recent scholars have re-evaluated the development of American liberalism in the 20th and 21st centuries, emphasizing how modern liberalism grew out of global intellectual traditions rather than solely domestic political movements.

=== Progressive Era ===
The progressive movement emerged in the 1890s and included intellectual reformers typified by sociologist Lester Frank Ward and economist Richard T. Ely. They transformed Victorian liberalism, retaining its commitment to civil liberties and individual rights while casting off its advocacy of laissez-faire economics. Ward helped define what would become the modern welfare state after 1933. These often supported the growing working-class labor unions and sometimes even the socialists to their left.

The Social Gospel movement was a Protestant intellectual movement that helped shape liberalism, especially from the 1890s to the 1920s. It applied Christian ethics to social problems, especially issues of social justice such as economic inequality, poverty, alcoholism, crime, racial tensions, slums, unclean environment, child labor, inadequate labor unions, poor schools and the danger of war. Lyndon B. Johnson's parents were active in the Social Gospel and had a lifetime commitment to it, for he sought to transform social problems into moral problems. This helps explain his longtime commitment to social justice as exemplified by the Great Society and his commitment to racial equality. The Social Gospel explicitly inspired his foreign-policy approach to a sort of Christian internationalism and nation building. In philosophy and education, John Dewey was highly influential.

In 1900–1920, liberals called themselves progressives. They rallied behind Republicans led by Theodore Roosevelt and Robert M. La Follette as well as Democrats led by William Jennings Bryan and Woodrow Wilson to fight corruption, waste and big trusts (monopolies). They stressed ideals of social justice and the use of government to solve social and economic problems. Settlement workers such as Jane Addams were leaders of the liberal tradition. There was a tension between sympathy with labor unions and the goal to apply scientific expertise by disinterested experts. When liberals became anti-Communist in the 1940s, they purged leftists from the liberal movement.

Political writer Herbert Croly helped to define the new liberalism through The New Republic magazine and numerous influential books. Croly presented the case for a planned economy, increased spending on education and the creation of a society based on the "brotherhood of mankind". His highly influential 1909 book The Promise of American Life proposed to raise the general standard of living by means of economic planning. Croly opposed aggressive unionization. In The Techniques of Democracy (1915), he also argued against both dogmatic individualism and dogmatic socialism.

The historian Vernon Louis Parrington in 1928 won the Pulitzer Prize for Main Currents in American Thought. It was a highly influential intellectual history of America from the colonial era to the early 20th century. It was well written and passionate about the value of Jeffersonian democracy and helped identify and honor liberal heroes and their ideas and causes. In 1930, Parrington argued: "For upwards of half a century creative political thinking in America was largely western agrarian, and from this source came those democratic ideas that were to provide the staple of a later liberalism". In 1945, historian Arthur M. Schlesinger Jr. argued in The Age of Jackson that liberalism also emerged from Jacksonian democracy and the labor radicalism of the Eastern cities, thereby linking it to the urban dimension of Roosevelt's New Deal.

In Congress, liberals during the Progressive Era influenced a number of reforms. As noted by William Allen White:

IN THE ELECTION of 1910 Kansas went overwhelmingly progressive Republican. The conservative faction was decisively divided. The same thing happened generally over the country north of the Mason and Dixon line. The progressive Republicans did not have a majority in either house of Congress. But they had a balance of power; amalgamation with a similar but smaller group of progressive Democrats under Bryan's leadership gave the progressives a working majority upon most measures. They had seen the conservative Democrats and the conservative Republicans united openly, proudly, victoriously to save Speaker Cannon from the ultimate humiliation when his power was taken from him by his progressive partisans. So in the legislatures and the Congress that met in 1911 a strange new thing was revealed in American politics. Party lines were breaking down. A bipartisan party was appearing in legislatures and in the Congress. It was an undeclared third party. But when the new party appeared on the left, the conservative Democrats and the conservative Republicans generally coalesced in legislative bodies on the right. For the most part the right wing coalescents were in the minority. In Congress, on most measures, the leftwing liberals were able to command a majority. They united upon a railroad regulation bill. They united in promoting the income tax constitutional amendment. They united in submitting another amendment providing for the direct election of United States Senators, which was indeed revolutionary. But they were unable to unite in the passage of a tariff bill. Local interests in regional commodity industries like cotton, lumber, copper, wool, and textiles were able to form a conservative alliance which, under the leadership of President Taft in the White House, put through a tariff bill that was an offense to the nation. But otherwise the new party of reform which had grown up in ten years dominated politics in Washington and in the state legislatures north of the Ohio from New England to California.

=== Liberal and moderate Republicans ===
With its emphasis on a strong federal government over claims of state's rights, widespread entrepreneurship and individual freedom against the property rights of slave owners, Abraham Lincoln's presidency laid much of the groundwork for future liberal Republican governance.

The Republican Party's liberal element in the early 20th century was typified by Theodore Roosevelt in the 1907–1912 period, although Roosevelt was more conservative at other points. Other liberal and moderate Republicans included Senator Robert M. La Follette and his sons in Wisconsin (from about 1900 to 1946) and Western leaders such as Senator Hiram Johnson in California, Senator George W. Norris in Nebraska, Senator Bronson M. Cutting in New Mexico, Congresswoman Jeannette Rankin in Montana and Senator William Borah in Idaho from about 1900 to about 1940. They were generally liberal in domestic policy as they supported unions and much of the New Deal. However, they were intensely isolationist in foreign policy. This element died out by the 1940s. Starting in the 1930s, a number of mostly Northeastern Republicans took modern liberal positions regarding labor unions, spending and New Deal policies. They included Governor Harold Stassen of Minnesota, Governor Thomas E. Dewey of New York, Governor Earl Warren of California, Senator Clifford P. Case of New Jersey, Henry Cabot Lodge Jr., of Massachusetts, Senator Prescott Bush of Connecticut (father of George H. W. Bush), Senator Jacob K. Javits of New York, Governor and later Senator Mark Hatfield of Oregon, Senator John Sherman Cooper of Kentucky, Senator George Aiken of Vermont, Governor William Scranton of Pennsylvania and Governor George Romney of Michigan. The most notable of them all was Governor Nelson Rockefeller of New York.

While the media often called them Rockefeller Republicans, the liberal Republicans never formed an organized movement or caucus and lacked a recognized leader. They promoted economic growth and high state and federal spending while accepting high taxes and much liberal legislation, with the provision they could administer it more efficiently. They opposed the Democratic big city machines while welcoming support from labor unions and big businesses alike. Religion was not high on their agenda, but they were strong believers in civil rights for African-Americans and women's rights and most liberals were pro-choice. They were also strong environmentalists and supported higher education. In foreign policy, they were internationalists, throwing their support to the moderate Dwight D. Eisenhower over the conservative leader Robert A. Taft in 1952. They were often called "the Eastern Establishment" by conservatives such as Barry Goldwater. The Goldwater conservatives fought this establishment, defeated Rockefeller in the 1964 primaries and eventually retired most of its members, although some such as Senator Charles Goodell and Mayor John Lindsay in New York became Democrats. As President, Richard Nixon adopted many of the liberals' positions regarding the environment, welfare and the arts. After Congressman John B. Anderson of Illinois bolted the party in 1980 and ran as an independent against Reagan, the liberal Republicans element faded away. Their old strongholds in the Northeast and West Coast are now mostly held by Democrats.

=== New Deal ===
The first inaugural address of Franklin D. Roosevelt on March 4, 1933 was broadcast on the radio to millions of Americans. Roosevelt's "Fear Itself" speech would become a benchmark liberal oration of the 20th century.

President Franklin D. Roosevelt came to office in 1933 amid the economic calamity of the Great Depression, offering the nation a New Deal intended to alleviate economic desperation and joblessness, provide greater opportunities and restore prosperity. His presidency was the longest in American history, lasting from 1933 to his death in 1945, and marked by an increased role for the federal government in addressing the nation's economic and social problems. Work relief programs provided jobs, ambitious projects such as the Tennessee Valley Authority were created to promote economic development and a social security system was established. The Roosevelt administration was assisted in its endeavors by progressives in Congress, with the congressional midterm elections of 1934 returning a more radical House of Representatives that was prepared to support progressive, new liberal measures. Also, while "during the Seventy-Third Congress, the House had been considered the more progressive body, now, in the new Seventy-Fourth, the senate was the more progressive chamber. Democrats added nine pro-New Deal senators, including Missouri's Harry S. Truman, who pledged 100 percent cooperation to President Roosevelt and his policies." As noted by J. Richard Piper:

As the "new" liberalism crystallized into its dominant form by 1935, both houses of Congress continued to provide large voting majorities for public policies that were generally dubbed "liberal". Conservatives constituted a distinct congressional minority from 1933 to 1937 and appeared threatened with oblivion for a time.

Conservative strength in Congress was diminished following the 1936 midterm elections. In the Senate there were now 28 conservatives, at least 8 to 10 less than at the end of the 1935 session. A similar situation existed in the House, with one study noting that "Roughly 30 Democrats who had already openly criticized many aspects of the New Deal returned. Together with some 80 conservative Republicans, they formed a conservative voting bloc of roughly 110, again slightly less than in 1935." As noted by one source, a liberal Congress existed for much of Roosevelt's presidency:

We recognize that the best liberal legislature in American history was enacted following the election of President Roosevelt and a liberal Congress in 1932. After the mid-term congressional election setbacks in 1938, labor was faced with a hostile congress until 1946. Only the presidential veto prevented the enactment of reactionary anti-labor laws.

As noted by a 1950 journal,

Look back to the 1930s and you can see how winning in mid-terms years affects the kind of laws that are passed. A tremendous liberal majority was swept in with Franklin Roosevelt in 1932. In the 1934 mid-term races that liberal majority was increased. After 1936 it went even higher.

The Great Depression seemed over in 1936, but a relapse in 1937–1938 produced continued long-term unemployment. Full employment was reached with the total mobilization of the United States economic, social and military resources in World War II. At that point, the main relief programs such as the WPA and the CCC were ended. Arthur Herman argues that Roosevelt restored prosperity after 1940 by cooperating closely with big business, although when asked "Do you think the attitude of the Roosevelt administration toward business is delaying business recovery?", the American people in 1939 responded "yes" by a margin of more than 2-to-1.

The New Deal programs to relieve the Great Depression are generally regarded as a mixed success in ending unemployment. At the time, many New Deal programs, especially the CCC, were popular. Liberals hailed them for improving the life of the common citizen and for providing jobs for the unemployed, legal protection for labor unionists, modern utilities for rural America, living wages for the working poor and price stability for the family farmer. Economic progress for minorities, however, was hindered by discrimination, an issue often avoided by Roosevelt's administration.

==== Relief, recovery and reform ====
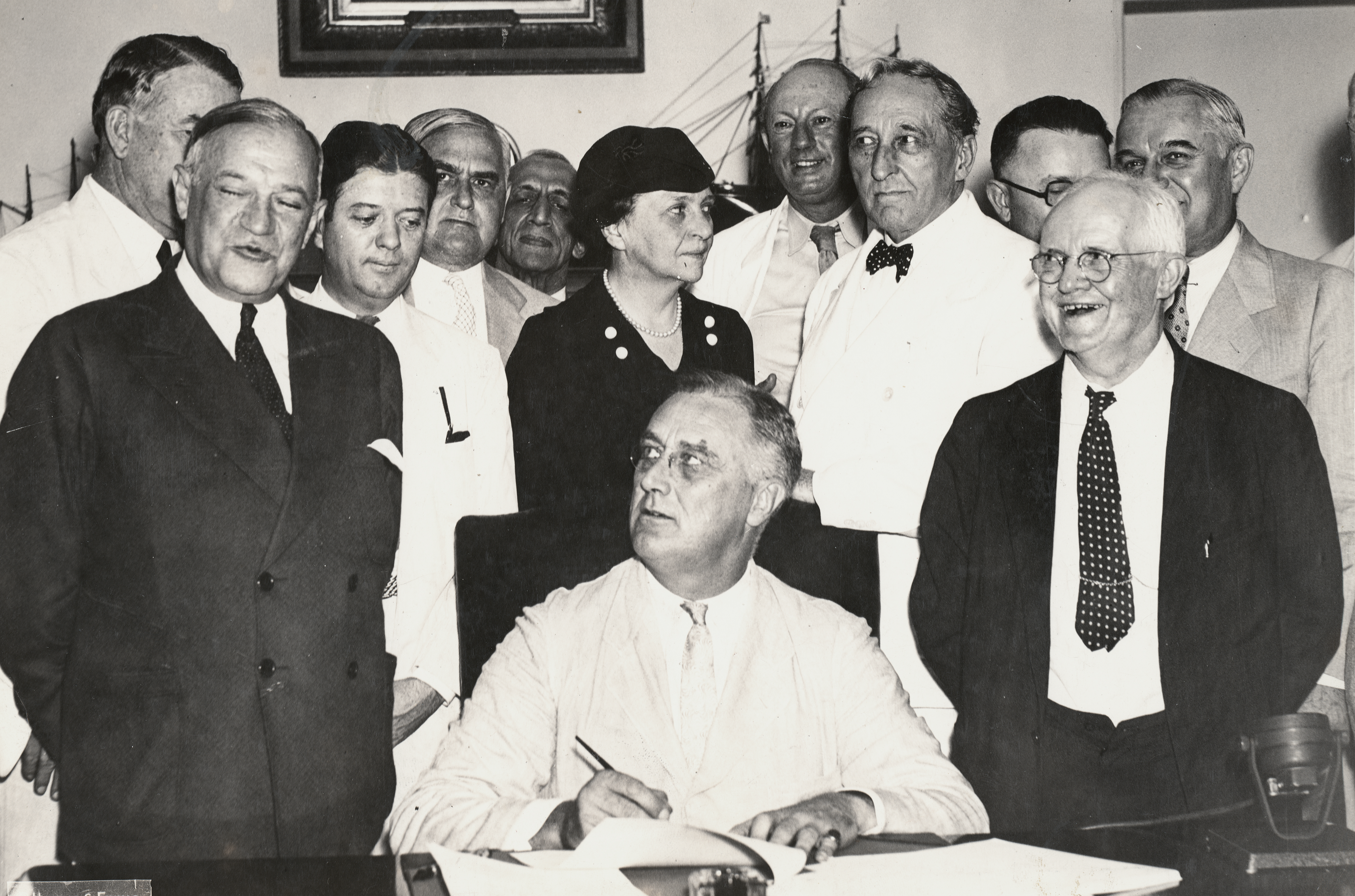
President Franklin D. Roosevelt signing the Social Security Act of 1935 into federal law, creating the Social Security Administration.

The New Deal consisted of three types of programs designed to produce relief, recovery and reform:

- Relief was the immediate effort to help the one-third of the population that was hardest hit by the depression. Roosevelt expanded Herbert Hoover's Federal Emergency Relief Administration (FERA) work relief program and added the Civilian Conservation Corps (CCC), the Public Works Administration (PWA) and starting in 1935 the Works Progress Administration (WPA). Also in 1935, the Social Security Act (SSA) and unemployment insurance programs were added. Separate programs such as the Resettlement Administration and the Farm Security Administration were set up for relief in rural America.
- Recovery was the goal of restoring the economy to pre-Depression levels. It involved greater spending of government funds in an effort to stimulate the economy, including deficit spending, dropping the gold standard and efforts to increase farm prices and foreign trade by lowering tariffs. Many programs were funded through a Hoover program of loans and loan guarantees, overseen by the Reconstruction Finance Corporation (RFC).
- Reform was based on the assumption that the depression was caused by the inherent instability of the market and that government intervention was necessary to rationalize and stabilize the economy and to balance the interests of farmers, businesses and labor. Reform measures included the National Industrial Recovery Act (NIRA), regulation of Wall Street by the Securities Exchange Act (SEA), the Agricultural Adjustment Act (AAA) for farm programs, the Federal Deposit Insurance Corporation (FDIC) insurance for bank deposits enacted through the Glass–Steagall Act of 1933 and the 1935 National Labor Relations Act (NLRA), also known as the Wagner Act, dealing with labor-management relations. Despite urgings by some New Dealers, there was no major antitrust program. Roosevelt opposed socialism in the sense of state ownership of the means of production and only one major program, namely the Tennessee Valley Authority (TVA), involved government ownership of the means of production (that is power plants and electrical grids). The conservatives feared the New Deal meant socialism and Roosevelt noted privately in 1934 that the "old line press harps increasingly on state socialism and demands the return to the good old days".

==== Race ====
The New Deal was racially segregated as blacks and whites rarely worked alongside each other in New Deal programs. The largest relief program by far was the WPA which operated segregated units as did its youth affiliate the NYA. Blacks were hired by the WPA as supervisors in the North. Of 10,000 WPA supervisors in the South, only 11 were black. In the first few weeks of operation, CCC camps in the North were integrated. By July 1935, all the camps in the United States were segregated and blacks were strictly limited in the supervisory roles they were assigned. Kinker and Smith argue that "even the most prominent racial liberals in the New Deal did not dare to criticize Jim Crow". Secretary of the Interior Harold Ickes was one of the Roosevelt administration's most prominent supporters of blacks and was former president of the Chicago chapter of the NAACP. When Senator Josiah Bailey, Democrat of North Carolina, accused him in 1937 of trying to break down segregation laws, Ickes wrote him to deny it:

I think it is up to the states to work out their social problems if possible, and while I have always been interested in seeing that the Negro has a square deal, I have never dissipated my strength against the particular stone wall of segregation. I believe that wall will crumble when the Negro has brought himself to a high educational and economic status. ... Moreover, while there are no segregation laws in the North, there is segregation in fact and we might as well recognize this.

The New Deal's record came under attack by New Left historians in the 1960s for its pusillanimity in not attacking capitalism more vigorously, nor helping blacks achieve equality. The critics emphasize the absence of a philosophy of reform to explain the failure of New Dealers to attack fundamental social problems. They demonstrate the New Deal's commitment to save capitalism and its refusal to strip away private property. They detect a remoteness from the people and indifference to participatory democracy and call instead for more emphasis on conflict and exploitation.

=== Foreign policies of Franklin D. Roosevelt ===
In international affairs Roosevelt's presidency until 1938 reflected the isolationism that dominated practically all of American politics at the time. After 1938, he moved toward interventionism as the world hurtled toward war. Liberals split on foreign policy as many followed Roosevelt while others such as John L. Lewis of the Congress of Industrial Organizations, historian Charles A. Beard and the Kennedy Family opposed him. However, Roosevelt added new conservative supporters such as Republicans Henry Stimson (who became his Secretary of War in 1940) and Wendell Willkie (who worked closely with Roosevelt after losing to him in the 1940s election). Anticipating the post-war period, Roosevelt strongly supported proposals to create a United Nations organization as a means of encouraging mutual cooperation to solve problems on the international stage. His commitment to internationalist ideals was in the tradition of Woodrow Wilson, except that Roosevelt learned from Wilson's mistakes regarding the League of Nations. For instance, Roosevelt included Republicans in shaping foreign policy and insisted the United States have a veto at the United Nations.

=== Liberalism during the Cold War ===
American liberalism of the Cold War era was the immediate heir to Franklin D. Roosevelt's New Deal and the somewhat more distant heir to the progressives of the early 20th century. Rossinow (2008) argues that after 1945 the left-liberal alliance that operated during the New Deal years split apart for good over the issue of Communism. Anti-Communist liberals led by Walter Reuther and Hubert Humphrey expelled the far-left from labor unions and the New Deal coalition and committed the Democratic Party to a strong Cold War policy typified by NATO and the containment of Communism. Liberals became committed to a quantitative goal of economic growth that accepted large near-monopolies such as General Motors and AT&T while rejecting the structural transformation dreamed of by earlier left-liberals. The far-left had its last hurrah in Henry A. Wallace's 1948 third-party presidential campaign. Wallace supported further New Deal reforms and opposed the Cold War, but his campaign was taken over by the far-left, and Wallace retired from politics in disgust.

Most prominent and constant among the positions of Cold War liberalism were the following:

- Support for a domestic economy built on a balance of power between labor (in the form of organized unions) and management (with a tendency to be more interested in large corporations than in small business).
- A foreign policy focused on containing the Soviet Union and its allies.
- The continuation and expansion of New Deal social welfare programs (in the broad sense of welfare, including programs such as Social Security).
- An embrace of Keynesian economics. By way of compromise with political groupings to their right, this often became in practice military Keynesianism.

In some ways, this resembled what in other countries was referred to as social democracy; however, American liberals never widely endorsed nationalization of industry like early European social democrats, instead favoring regulation for public benefit. In the 1950s and 1960s, both major American political parties included liberal and conservative factions. The Democratic Party included the Northern and Western liberals on one hand and the generally conservative Southern whites on the other. Difficult to classify were the Northern big city Democratic political machines. The urban machines had supported New Deal economic policies, but they faded with the coming of prosperity and the assimilation of ethnic groups. Nearly all collapsed by the 1960s in the face of racial violence in the cities The Republican Party included the moderate-to-liberal Wall Street and the moderate-to-conservative Main street. The more liberal wing, strongest in the Northeast, was far more supportive of New Deal programs, labor unions and an internationalist foreign policy. Support for anti-Communism sometimes came at the expense of civil liberties. For example, ADA co-founder and archetypal Cold War liberal Hubert Humphrey unsuccessfully sponsored in 1950 a Senate bill to establish detention centers where those declared subversive by the President could be held without trial. Nonetheless, liberals opposed McCarthyism and were central to McCarthy's downfall.

In domestic policy during the Fifth Party System (1932–1966), liberals seldom had full control of government, but conservatives never had full control in that period either. According to Jonathan Bernstein, neither liberals nor Democrats controlled the House of Representatives very often from 1939 through 1957, although a 1958 landslide gave liberals real majorities in both houses of Congress for the first time in twenty years. However, Rules Committee reforms and others were carried out following this landslide as liberals saw that House procedures "still prevented them from using that majority". The conservative coalition was also important (if not dominant) from 1967 through 1974, although Congress had a liberal Democratic majority from 1985 to 1994. As also noted by Bernstein, "there have only been a handful of years (Franklin D. Roosevelt's first term, 1961–1966, Jimmy Carter's presidency, and the first two years of Clinton's and Barack Obama's presidencies) when there were clear, working liberal majorities in the House, the Senate and the White House".

In Congress, during the Cold War period, Democrats were generally found to have more liberal voting records than their Republican counterparts. Based on 61 key votes, a study by the AFL-CIO Committee on Political Action of voting patterns in the House of Representatives from 1947 through 1960 gave Democrats on average a liberal score of 69.7%, compared with 23.9% for Republicans.

A number of progressive laws were also approved during the course of the Fifth Party System. Later, during the Reagan-Bush years, congressional majorities voted in favor of a number of liberal measures, while a number of progressive labor measures were also introduced on a State level, concerning such matters as sexual harassment, safeguards from employer retaliation against an employee reporting a violation of law or participating in an enforcement proceeding, equal pay, the right of employees to receive information on toxic substances, minimum wage rates, parental leave, discrimination, meal periods, and occupational safety and health.

=== Harry S. Truman's Fair Deal ===
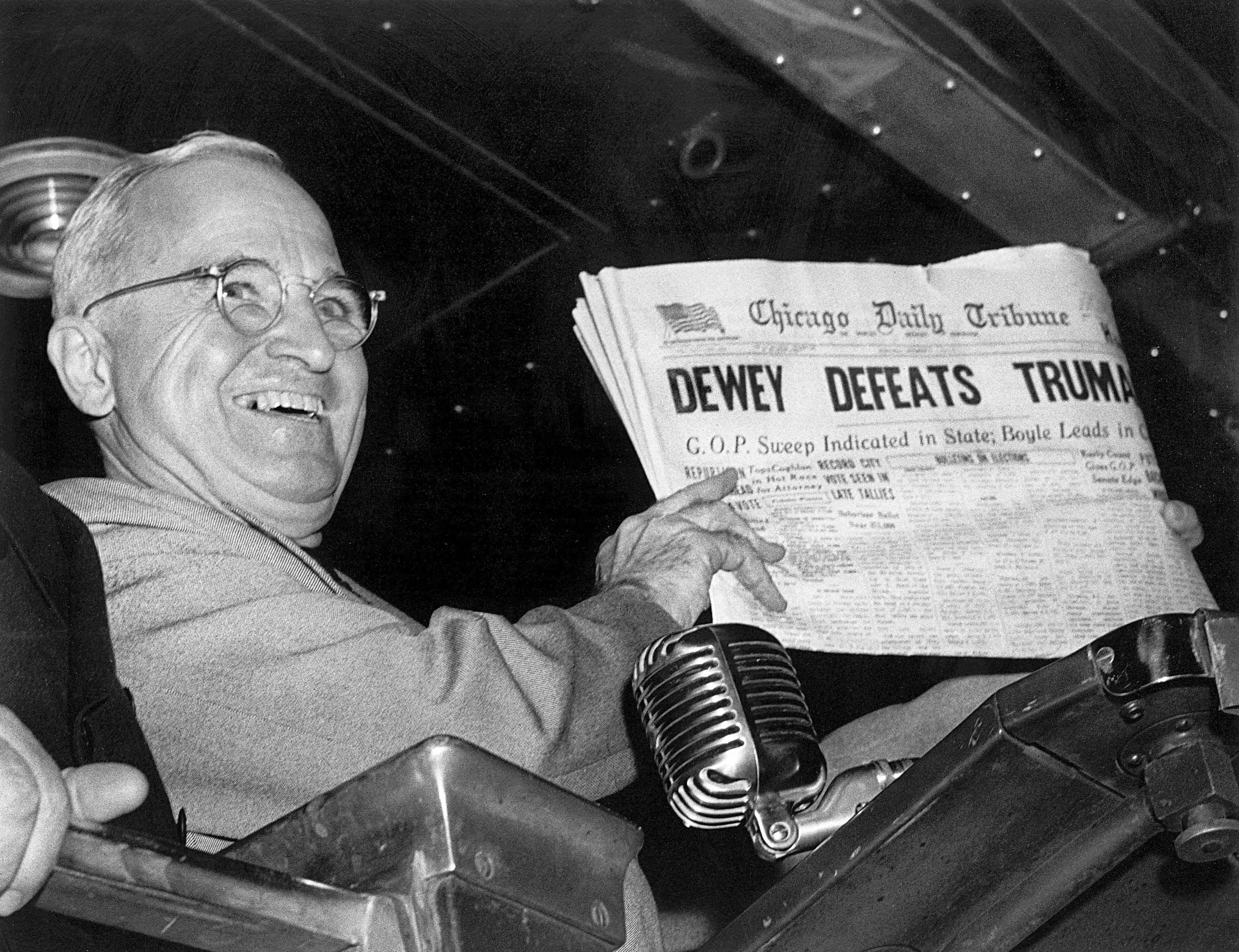
Harry S. Truman's successful re-election campaign in the 1948 presidential election proved the vitality of the New Deal coalition, as Truman had low approval ratings and faced opposition from Southern Democrats over his integration of the U.S. Armed Forces. Pictured is the infamous "Dewey Defeats Truman" headline from the Chicago Daily Tribune.

Until he became president, liberals generally did not see Harry S. Truman as one of their own, viewing him as a Democratic Party hack. However, liberal politicians and liberal organizations such as the unions and Americans for Democratic Action (ADA) supported Truman's liberal Fair Deal proposals to continue and expand the New Deal. Alonzo Hamby argues that the Fair Deal reflected the vital center approach to liberalism which rejected totalitarianism, was suspicious of excessive concentrations of government power, and honored the New Deal as an effort to achieve a progressive capitalist system. Solidly based upon the New Deal tradition in its advocacy of wide-ranging social legislation, the Fair Deal differed enough to claim a separate identity. The depression did not return after the war and the Fair Deal faced prosperity and an optimistic future.

The Fair Dealers thought in terms of abundance rather than depression scarcity. Economist Leon Keyserling argued that the liberal task was to spread the benefits of abundance throughout society by stimulating economic growth. Agriculture Secretary Charles F. Brannan wanted to unleash the benefits of agricultural abundance and to encourage the development of an urban-rural Democratic coalition. However, the "Brannan Plan" was defeated by his unrealistic confidence in the possibility of uniting urban labor and farm owners who distrusted rural insurgency. The conservative coalition of Northern Republicans and Southern Democrats in Congress effectively blocked the Fair Deal and nearly all liberal legislation from the late 1930s to 1960. The Korean War made military spending the nation's priority. Under Truman, the number of Federal grant programmes more than doubled to 71. In the 1960s, Stanford University historian Barton Bernstein repudiated Truman for failing to carry forward the New Deal agenda and for excessive anti-Communism at home.

=== 1950s ===
Combating conservatism was not high on the liberal agenda, for the liberal ideology was so intellectually dominant by 1950 that the literary critic Lionel Trilling could note that "liberalism is not only the dominant but even the sole intellectual tradition ... . [T]here are no conservative or reactionary ideas in circulation." Most historians see liberalism in the doldrums in the 1950s, with the old spark of New Deal dreams overshadowed by the glitzy complacency and conservatism of the Eisenhower years. Adlai Stevenson II lost in two landslides and presented few new liberal proposals apart from a suggestion for a worldwide ban on nuclear tests. As Barry Karl noted, Stevenson "has suffered more at hands of the admirers he failed than he ever did from the enemies who defeated him". Many liberals bemoan the willingness of Democratic leaders Lyndon B. Johnson and Sam Rayburn to collaborate in Congress with Eisenhower and the commitment of the AFL–CIO unions and most liberal spokesmen such as Senators Hubert Humphrey and Paul Douglas to anti-Communism at home and abroad. They decry the weak attention most liberals paid to the nascent civil rights movement.

=== Liberal coalition ===
Politically, starting in the late 1940s there was a powerful labor–liberal coalition with strong grassroots support, energetic well-funded organizations and a cadre of supporters in Congress. On labor side was the American Federation of Labor (AFL) and the Congress of Industrial Organizations (CIO) which merged into the AFL–CIO in 1955, the United Auto Workers (UAW), union lobbyists and the Committee on Political Education (COPE) which organized turnout campaigns and publicity at elections. Walter Reuther of the UAW was the leader of liberalism in the labor movement and his autoworkers generously funded the cause. The main liberal organizations included the National Association for the Advancement of Colored People (NAACP), the American Jewish Congress (AJC), the American Civil Liberties Union (ACLU), the Leadership Conference on Civil Rights (LCCR), the National Committee for an Effective Congress (NCEC) and the Americans for Democratic Action (ADA).

Key liberal leaders in Congress included Hubert Humphrey of Minnesota, Paul Douglas of Illinois, Henry Jackson of Washington, Walter Mondale of Minnesota and Claude Pepper of Florida in the Senate Leaders in the House included Representatives Frank Thompson of New Jersey, Richard Bolling of Missouri and other members of the Democratic Study Group. Although for years they had largely been frustrated by the conservative coalition, the liberal coalition suddenly came to power in 1963 and were ready with proposals that became central to the Great Society. Humphrey's liberal legacy is bolstered by his early leadership in civil rights and undermined by his long support of the Vietnam War. His biographer Arnold Offner says he was, "the most successful legislator in the nation's history and a powerful voice for equal justice for all." Offner states that Humphrey was:

A major force for nearly every important liberal policy initiative...putting civil rights on his party's and the nation's agenda [in 1948] for decades to come. As senator he proposed legislation to effect national health insurance, for aid to poor nations, immigration and income tax reform, a Job Corps, the Peace Corps, the Arms Control and Disarmament Agency, and the path breaking 1963 Limited Test Ban Treaty...[He provided] masterful stewardship of the historic 1964 Civil Rights Act through the Senate.

==== Intellectuals ====
Intellectuals and writers were an important component of the coalition at this point. Many writers, especially historians, became prominent spokesmen for liberalism and were frequently called upon for public lectures and for popular essays on political topics by magazines such as The New Republic, Saturday Review, The Atlantic Monthly and Harpers. Also active in the arena of ideas were literary critics such as Lionel Trilling and Alfred Kazin, economists such as Alvin Hansen, John Kenneth Galbraith, James Tobin and Paul Samuelson as well as political scientists such as Robert A. Dahl and Seymour Martin Lipset and sociologists such as David Riesman and Daniel Patrick Moynihan. Representative was the historian Henry Steele Commager, who felt a duty to teach his fellow citizens how liberalism was the foundation of American values. He believed that an educated public that understands American history would support liberal programs, especially internationalism and the New Deal. Commager was representative of a whole generation of like-minded historians who were widely read by the general public, including Allan Nevins, Daniel Boorstin, Richard Hofstadter and C. Vann Woodward. Perhaps the most prominent of all was Arthur M. Schlesinger Jr., whose books on Andrew Jackson and on Roosevelt and the Kennedy brothers as well as his many essays and his work with liberal organizations and in the White House itself under Kennedy emphasized the ideological history of American liberalism, especially as made concrete by a long tradition of powerful liberal presidents.

Commager's biographer Neil Jumonville has argued that this style of influential public history has been lost in the 21st century because political correctness has rejected Commager's open marketplace of tough ideas. Jumonville says history now comprises abstruse deconstruction by experts, with statistics instead of stories and is now comprehensible only to the initiated while ethnocentrism rules in place of common identity. Other experts have traced the relative decline of intellectuals to their concern race, ethnicity and gender and scholarly antiquarianism.

=== Great Society: 1964–1968 ===
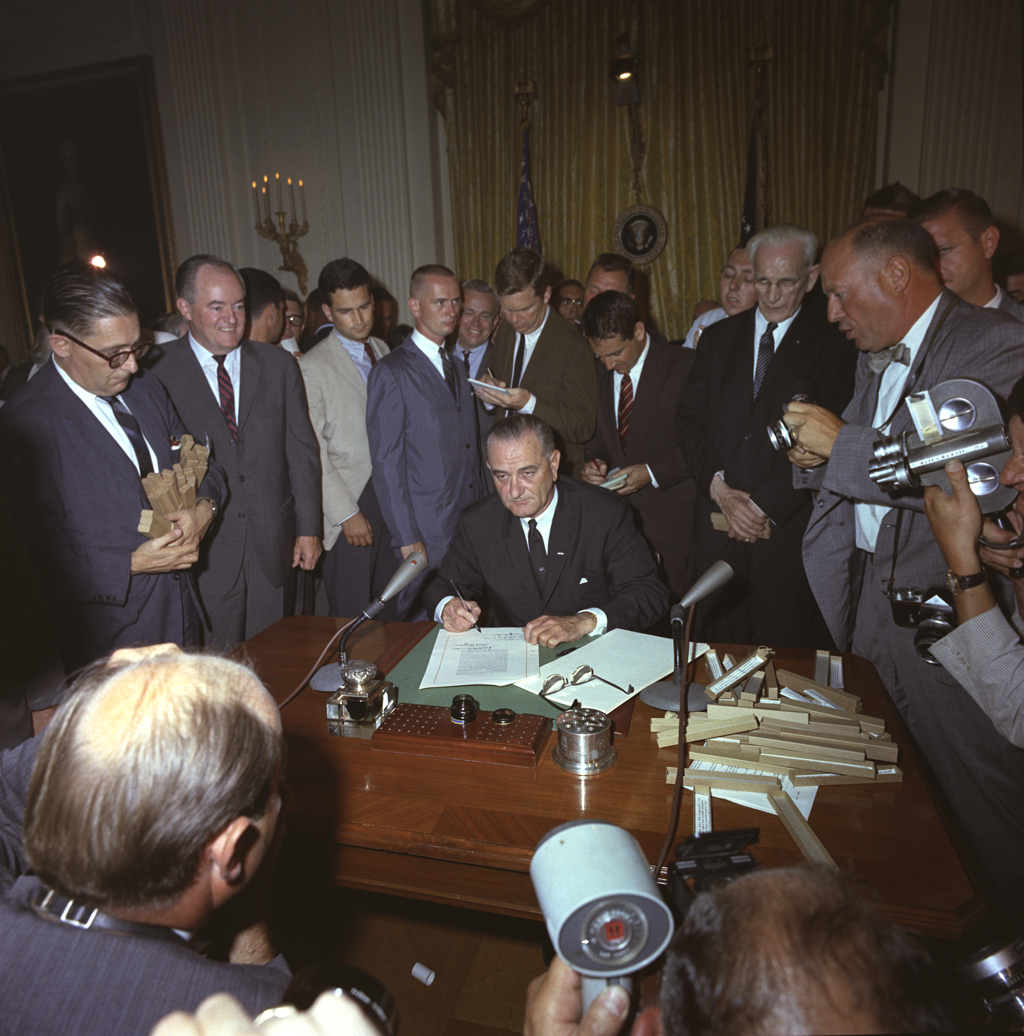
President Lyndon B. Johnson signing the Civil Rights Act of 1964 on July 2, 1964

The climax of liberalism came in the mid-1960s with the success of President Lyndon B. Johnson (1963–1969) in securing congressional passage of his Great Society programs, including civil rights, the end of segregation, Medicare, extension of welfare, federal aid to education at all levels, subsidies for the arts and humanities, environmental activism and a series of programs designed to wipe out poverty. Under Johnson's leadership, as noted by one study, "more than 200 new Federal programmes of grants to States, cities, counties, school districts, local communities and charities were authorized." According to historian Joseph Crespino:

It has become a staple of twentieth-century historiography that Cold War concerns were at the root of a number of progressive political accomplishments in the postwar period: a high progressive marginal tax rate that helped fund the arms race and contributed to broad income equality; bipartisan support for far-reaching civil rights legislation that transformed politics and society in the American South, which had long given the lie to America's egalitarian ethos; bipartisan support for overturning an explicitly racist immigration system that had been in place since the 1920s; and free health care for the elderly and the poor, a partial fulfillment of one of the unaccomplished goals of the New Deal era. The list could go on.

As 21st-century historians have explained:

Gradually, liberal intellectuals crafted a new vision for achieving economic and social justice. The liberalism of the early 1960s contained no hint of radicalism, little disposition to revive new deal era crusades against concentrated economic power, and no intention to fan class passions or redistribute wealth or restructure existing institutions. Internationally it was strongly anti-Communist. It aimed to defend the free world, to encourage economic growth at home, and to ensure that the resulting plenty was fairly distributed. Their agenda-much influenced by Keynesian economic theory-envisioned massive public expenditure that would speed economic growth, thus providing the public resources to fund larger welfare, housing, health, and educational programs.

Johnson was rewarded with an electoral landslide in 1964 against conservative Barry Goldwater which broke the decades-long control of Congress by the conservative coalition; however, the Republicans bounced back in 1966 and as the Democratic Party splintered five ways Republicans elected Richard Nixon in 1968. Faced with a generally liberal Democratic Congress during his presidency, Nixon used his power over executive agencies to obstruct the authorization of programs that he was opposed to. As noted by one observer, Nixon "claimed the authority to 'impound,' or withhold, money Congress appropriated to support them". Nevertheless, Nixon largely failed to curtail or permitted most of the liberal programs he inherited. Conservative reaction would come with the election of Ronald Reagan in 1980. In addition, throughout the Sixties and Seventies Congresses dominated by the Democrats carried out a range of social initiatives. According to one study, "Democrats at both ends of Pennsylvania Avenue between 1961 and 1969, and persisting Democratic majorities thereafter, did not so much extend the range of New Deal social programmes as take wholly new initiatives in urban, social, transportation, and educational policy which their successors have been obliged to defend politically and fiscally." Also, "Congresses dominated by Democrats (and often liberals) between 1964 and 1977 passed a panoply of environmental, health, safety, labour, product standards and civil rights laws and regulations." Liberals dominated Congress for much of the Sixties and Seventies, such as the 95th and 96th Congresses, with less than half of their members voting conservatively.

=== Liberals and civil rights ===
James Meredith (center) being escorted to class at Ole Miss in Oxford, Mississippi by U.S. Marshal James McShane (left) and Justice Department official John Doar (right). In the early 1960s, the Kennedy administration began enforcing civil rights despite political pushback from Southern Democrats.

Cold War liberalism emerged at a time when most African Americans, especially in the South, were politically and economically disenfranchised. Beginning with To Secure These Rights, an official report issued by the Truman White House in 1947, self-proclaimed liberals increasingly embraced the civil rights movement. In 1948, President Truman desegregated the armed forces, and the Democrats inserted a strong civil rights plank or provision in the Democratic Party platform. Black activists, most prominently Martin Luther King Jr., escalated the bearer agitation throughout the South, especially in Birmingham, Alabama during the 1963 Birmingham campaign, where brutal police tactics outraged national television audiences. The civil rights movement climaxed in the March on Washington in August 1963, where King gave his dramatic "I Have a Dream" speech, culminating in the events of the 1965 Selma to Montgomery marches. The activism put civil rights at the very top of the liberal political agenda and facilitated passage of the decisive Civil Rights Act of 1964 which permanently ended segregation in the United States and the Voting Rights Act of 1965 which guaranteed blacks the right to vote, with strong enforcement provisions throughout the South handled by the federal Department of Justice.

During the mid-1960s, relations between white liberals and the civil rights movement became increasingly strained as civil rights leaders accused liberal politicians of temporizing and procrastinating. Although President Kennedy sent federal troops to compel the University of Mississippi to admit African American James Meredith in 1962 and civil rights leader Martin Luther King Jr. toned down the 1963 March on Washington at Kennedy's behest, the failure to seat the delegates of the Mississippi Freedom Democratic Party at the 1964 Democratic National Convention indicated a growing rift. President Johnson could not understand why the rather impressive civil rights laws passed under his leadership had failed to immunize Northern and Western cities from rioting. At the same time, the civil rights movement itself was becoming fractured. By 1966, a Black Power movement had emerged. Black Power advocates accused white liberals of trying to control the civil rights agenda. Proponents of Black Power wanted African Americans to follow an ethnic model for obtaining power, not unlike that of Democratic political machines in large cities. This put them on a collision course with urban machine politicians. On its most extreme edges, the Black Power movement contained racial separatists who wanted to give up on integration altogether—a program that could not be endorsed by American liberals of any race. The mere existence of such individuals (who always got more media attention than their actual numbers might have warranted) contributed to white backlash against liberals and civil rights activists.

Liberals were latecomers to the movement for equal rights for women. Generally, they agreed with Eleanor Roosevelt on the issue of women and the perceived need for special protections, especially regarding hours of work, night work and physically heavy work. The Equal Rights Amendment (ERA) had first been proposed in the 1920s by Alice Paul and appealed primarily to middle-class career women. At the Democratic National Convention in 1960, a proposal to endorse the ERA was rejected after it met explicit opposition from liberal groups including labor unions, AFL–CIO, American Civil Liberties Union (ACLU), Americans for Democratic Action (ADA), American Federation of Teachers, American Nurses Association, the Women's Division of the Methodist Church and the National Councils of Jewish, Catholic, and Negro Women.

=== Neoconservatives ===
Some liberals moved to the right and became neoconservatives in the 1970s. Many were animated by foreign policy, taking a strong anti-Soviet and pro-Israel position as typified by Commentary, a Jewish magazine. Many had been supporters of Senator Henry M. Jackson, a Democrat noted for his strong positions in favor of labor and against Communism. Many neoconservatives joined the administrations of Ronald Reagan and George H. W. Bush and attacked liberalism vocally in both the popular media and scholarly publications. However, the rise of Trumpism from 2016 on shifted the Republican coalition away from consistent agreement with neoconservative foreign policy positions. Neoconservatives became a prominent force in the Never Trump movement, with some such as Bill Kristol and Jennifer Rubin reconciling with modern liberals and the realigning Democratic coalition.

=== Under attack from the New Left ===
Liberalism came under attack from both the New Left in the early 1960s and the right in the late 1960s. Kazin (1998) says: "The liberals who anxiously turned back the assault of the postwar Right were confronted in the 1960s by a very different adversary: a radical movement led, in the main, by their own children, the white "New Left". This new element, says Kazin, worked to "topple the corrupted liberal order". As Maurice Isserman notes, the New Left "came to use the word 'liberal' as a political epithet". Slack (2013) argues that the New Left was more broadly speaking the political component of a break with liberalism that took place across several academic fields, namely philosophy, psychology and sociology. In philosophy, existentialism and neo-Marxism rejected the instrumentalism of John Dewey; in psychology, Wilhelm Reich, Paul Goodman, Herbert Marcuse and Norman O. Brown rejected Sigmund Freud's teaching of repression and sublimation; and in sociology, C. Wright Mills rejected the pragmatism of Dewey for the teachings of Max Weber. The attack was not confined to the United States as the New Left was a worldwide movement with strength in parts of Western Europe as well as Japan. For example, massive demonstrations in France denounced American imperialism and its helpers in Western European governments.

The main activity of the New Left became opposition to United States involvement in the Vietnam War as conducted by liberal President Lyndon B. Johnson. The anti-war movement escalated the rhetorical heat as violence broke out on both sides. The climax came in sustained protests at the 1968 Democratic National Convention. Liberals fought back, with Zbigniew Brzezinski, chief foreign policy advisor of the 1968 Humphrey campaign, saying the New Left "threatened American liberalism" in a manner reminiscent of McCarthyism. While the New Left considered Humphrey a war criminal, Nixon attacked him as the New Left's enabler—a man with "a personal attitude of indulgence and permissiveness toward the lawless". Beinart concludes that "with the country divided against itself, contempt for Hubert Humphrey was the one thing on which left and right could agree". After 1968, the New Left lost strength and the more serious attacks on liberalism came from the right. Nevertheless, the liberal ideology lost its attractiveness. Liberal commentator E. J. Dionne contends: "If liberal ideology began to crumble intellectually in the 1960s it did so in part because the New Left represented a highly articulate and able wrecking crew".

=== Liberals and the Vietnam War ===
While the civil rights movement isolated liberals from their erstwhile allies, the Vietnam War threw a wedge into the liberal ranks, dividing pro-war hawks such as Senator Henry M. Jackson from doves such as 1972 presidential candidate Senator George McGovern. As the war became the leading political issue of the day, agreement on domestic matters was not enough to hold the liberal consensus together. In the 1960 United States presidential campaign, John F. Kennedy was liberal in domestic policy but conservative on foreign policy, calling for a more aggressive stance against Communism than his opponent Richard Nixon. Opposition to the war first emerged from the New Left and from black leaders such as Martin Luther King Jr. By 1967, there was growing opposition from within liberal ranks, led in 1968 by Senators Eugene McCarthy and Robert F. Kennedy. After Democratic President Lyndon Johnson announced in March 1968 that he would not run for re-election, Kennedy and McCarthy fought each other for the nomination, with Kennedy besting McCarthy in a series of Democratic primaries. The assassination of Kennedy removed him from the race and Vice President Hubert Humphrey emerged from the disastrous 1968 Democratic National Convention with the presidential nomination of a deeply divided party. Meanwhile, Alabama Governor George Wallace announced his third-party run and pulled in many working-class whites in the rural South and big-city North, most of whom had been staunch Democrats. Liberals led by the labor unions focused their attacks on Wallace while Nixon led a unified Republican Party to victory.

=== Richard Nixon ===
The chaos of 1968, a bitterly divided Democratic Party and bad blood between the New Left and liberals gave Nixon the presidency. Nixon attacked liberals and codified modern conservative ideas like New Federalism, opposition to existing welfare programs in exchange for a heavily means-tested negative income tax with work requirements, and deregulation, but tolerated many liberal policies passed by Congress, which was under near-supermajority control by Democrats for much of his presidency. While privately holding dismissive views of the environmental movement, Nixon signed a number of laws passed that guaranteed widespread environmental protections, and reorganized these functions under the Environmental Protection Agency by executive action in 1970, though he did veto the Clean Water Act of 1972, and impounded funds authorized to implement it after Congress's successful veto override. He also expanded the national endowments for the arts and the humanities, began affirmative action policies, opened diplomatic relations with the People's Republic of China, starting the Strategic Arms Limitation Talks to reduce ballistic missile availability and turned the war over to South Vietnam. He withdrew all American combat troops by 1972, signed a peace treaty in 1973 and ended the draft. Regardless of his policies, liberals hated Nixon and rejoiced when the Watergate scandal forced his resignation in 1974. While the differences between Nixon and the liberals are obvious — the liberal wing of his own party favored politicians such as Nelson Rockefeller and William Scranton and Nixon placed an emphasis on law and order over civil liberties, with Nixon's Enemies List being composed largely of liberals — in some ways the continuity of many of Nixon's policies with those of the Kennedy–Johnson years is more remarkable than the differences. Pointing at this continuity, New Left leader Noam Chomsky (himself on Nixon's enemies list) has called Nixon "in many respects the last liberal president".

The political dominance of the liberal consensus even into the Nixon years can best be seen in policies such as the successful establishment of the Environmental Protection Agency or his failed proposal to replace the welfare system with a guaranteed annual income by way of a negative income tax. Affirmative action in its most quota-oriented form was a Nixon administration policy. The Nixon war on drugs allocated two-thirds of its funds for treatment, a far higher ratio than was to be the case under any subsequent President, Republican or Democrat. Additionally, Nixon's normalization of diplomatic relations with the People's Republic of China and his policy of détente with the Soviet Union were probably more popular with liberals than with his conservative base. An opposing view offered by Cass R. Sunstein argues that through his Supreme Court appointments Nixon effectively ended a decades-long expansion of economic rights along the lines of those put forward in the Universal Declaration of Human Rights, adopted in 1948 by the United Nations General Assembly.

=== Labor unions ===
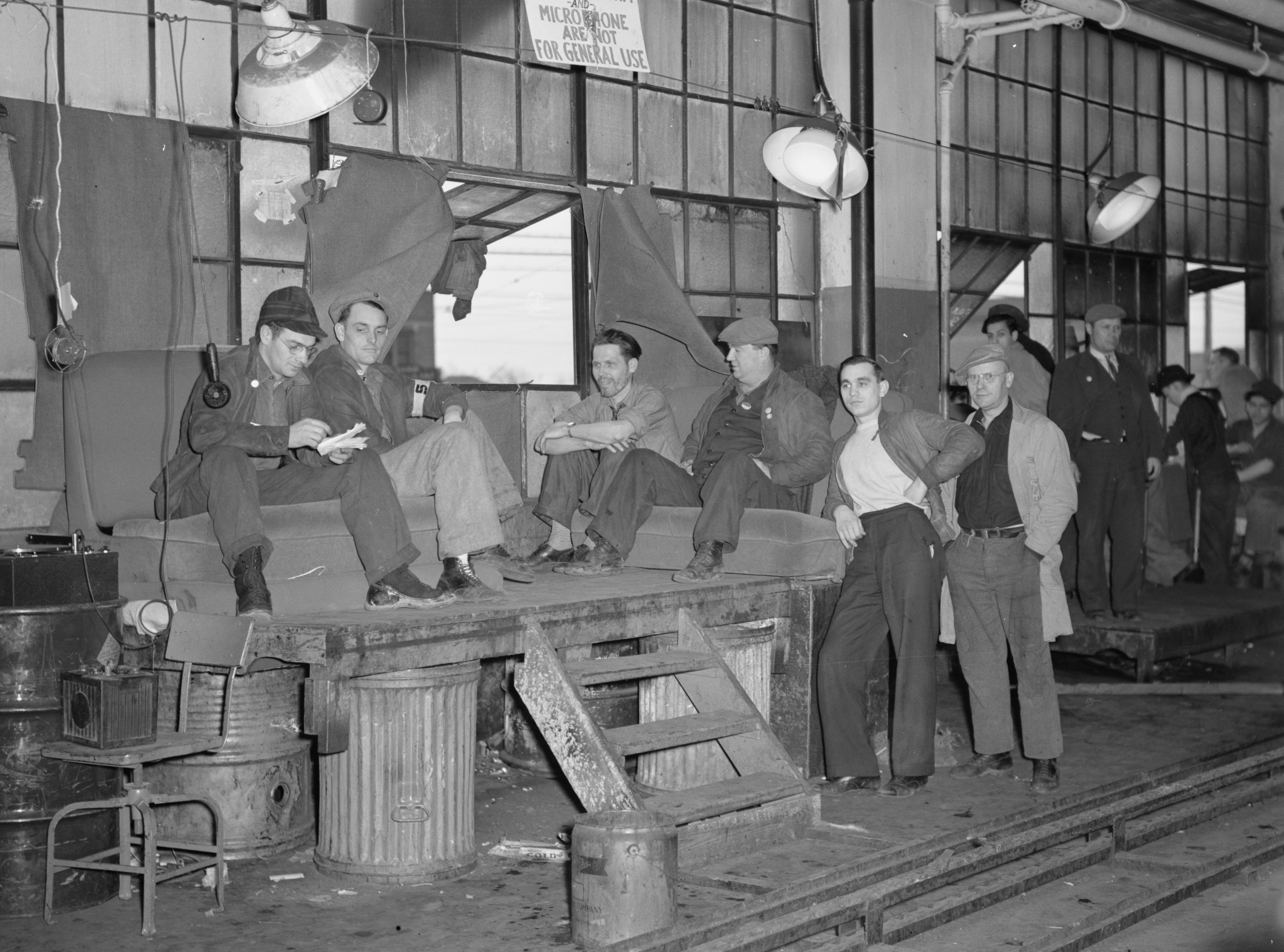
General Motors workers at a production plant in Flint, Michigan during the Flint sit-down strike in 1937. The strike led to a unification of smaller automotive unions in Michigan to form what is today the United Auto Workers (UAW).

Labor unions were central components of liberalism, operating through the New Deal coalition. The unions gave strong support to the Vietnam War, thereby breaking with the blacks and with the intellectual and student wings of liberalism. The legacy of slavery deeply entrenched racial divisions within the American working class, in sharp contrast to the more unified labor movements of countries without a history of racial segregation. These divisions produced a two-tiered labor force with competing priorities on issues such as taxation, social welfare, and economic equality. Racial stratification fostered resistance among white workers to policies perceived as redistributing resources along racial lines. As a result, political interests increasingly diverged by race, ultimately weakening class solidarity and impeding the development of a cohesive labor movement. From time to time, dissident groups such as the Progressive Alliance, the Citizen-Labor Energy Coalition and the National Labor Committee broke from the dominant AFL–CIO which they saw as too conservative. In 1995, the liberals managed to take control of the AFL–CIO under the leadership of John Sweeney of the Service Employees International Union (SEIU). Union membership in the private sector has fallen from 33% to 7%, with a resulting decline in political weight. In 2005, the SEIU, now led by Andy Stern, broke away from the AFL–CIO to form its own coalition, the Change to Win Federation, to support liberalism, including Barack Obama's policies, especially health care reform. Stern retired in 2010. Regardless of the loss of numbers, unions have a long tradition and deep experience in organizing and continue at the state and national level to mobilize forces for liberal policies, especially regarding votes for liberal politicians, a graduated income tax, government spending on social programs, and support for unions. They also support the conservative position of protectionism. Offsetting the decline in the private sector is a growth of unionization in the public sector. The membership of unions in the public sector such as teachers, police and city workers continue to rise, now covering 42% of local government workers. The financial crisis that hit American states during the recession of 2008–2011 focused increasing attention on pension systems for government employees, with conservatives trying to reduce the pensions.

=== Environmentalism ===
A new unexpected political discourse emerged in the 1970s centered on the environment. The debates did not fall neatly into a left–right dimension, for everyone proclaimed their support for the environment. Environmentalism appealed to the well-educated middle class, but it aroused fears among lumbermen, farmers, ranchers, blue collar workers, automobile companies and oil companies whose economic interests were threatened by new regulations. As a result, conservatives tended to oppose environmentalism while liberals endorsed new measures to protect the environment. Liberals supported the Wilderness Society and the Sierra Club and were sometimes successful in blocking efforts by lumber companies and oil drillers to expand operations. Environmental legislation limited the use of DDT, reduced acid rain and protected numerous animal and plant species. Within the environmental movement, there was a small radical element that favored direct action rather than legislation. By the 21st century, debates over taking major action to reverse global warming by and dealing with carbon emissions were high on the agenda. Unlike Europe, where green parties play a growing role in politics, the environmental movement in the United States has given little support to third parties.

=== End of the liberal consensus ===
During the 1970s and through the era in economic history dominated by stagflation, the liberal consensus began to come apart, culminating with the elections of Jimmy Carter and Ronald Reagan, whose policies were, in theory or in fact, oriented around neoliberalism — austerity, monetarism, and deregulated free-market economics. The alliance with white Southern Democrats had disappeared during the Civil Rights era, and they were carried into the Republican Party by Nixon's Southern Strategy. While the steady enfranchisement of African Americans expanded the electorate to include many new voters sympathetic to liberal views, it was not quite enough to make up for the loss of some Southern Democrats. A tide of conservatism rose in response to perceived failures of liberal policies.

Organized labor, long a bulwark of the liberal consensus, was past the peak of its power in the United States and many unions had remained in favor of the Vietnam War even as liberal politicians increasingly turned against it. In 1980, the leading liberal was Senator Ted Kennedy, who challenged incumbent President Jimmy Carter for the Democratic Party presidential nomination because Carter's failures had disenchanted liberals. Kennedy was decisively defeated, and in turn Carter was defeated by Ronald Reagan. Historians often use 1979–1980 to date a philosophical realignment within the American electorate away from Democratic liberalism and toward Reagan Era conservatism; however, some liberals hold a minority view that there was no real shift and that Kennedy's defeat was merely by historical accident caused by his poor campaign, international crises, and Carter's use of the incumbency.

Abrams (2006) argues that the eclipse of liberalism was caused by a grass-roots populist revolt, often with a Christian fundamentalist and anti-modern theme, abetted by corporations eager to weaken labor unions and the regulatory regime of the New Deal. The success of liberalism in the first place, he argues, came from efforts of a liberal elite that had entrenched itself in key social, political and especially judicial positions. These elites, Abrams contends, imposed their brand of liberalism from within some of the least democratic and most insulated institutions, especially the universities, foundations, independent regulatory agencies and the Supreme Court. With only a weak popular base, liberalism was vulnerable to a populist counter-revolution by the nation's democratic or majoritarian forces.

=== Decline during Clinton administration and the Third Way ===
The term Third Way represents various political positions which try to reconcile right-wing and left-wing politics by advocating a varying synthesis of centre-right economic and left-leaning social policies. Third Way was created as a serious re-evaluation of political policies within various center-left progressive movements in response to the ramifications of the collapse of international belief in the economic viability of the state economic interventionist policies that had previously been popularized by Keynesianism and the corresponding rise of popularity for neoliberalism and the New Right. It supports the pursuit of greater egalitarianism in society through action to increase the distribution of skills, capacities, and productive endowments, while rejecting income redistribution as the means to achieve this. It emphasizes commitment to balanced budgets, providing equal opportunity combined with an emphasis on personal responsibility, decentralization of government power to the lowest level possible, encouragement of public-private partnerships, improving labor supply, investment in human development, protection of social capital and protection of the environment.

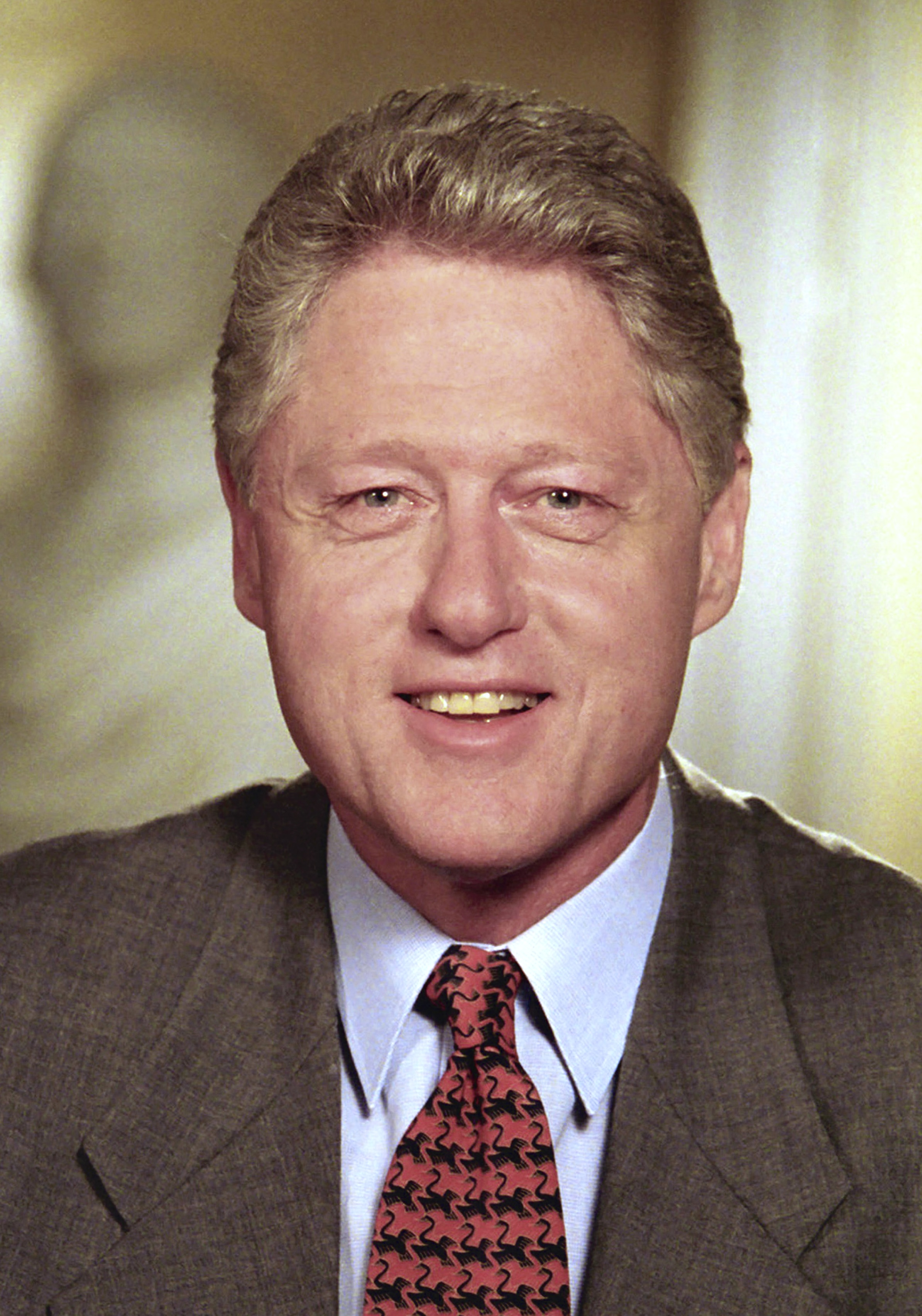
Bill Clinton won the 1992 presidential election in part by appealing to former Reagan voters who held moderate social and economic stances.

In the United States, Third Way adherents embrace fiscal conservatism to a greater extent than traditional social liberals and advocate some replacement of welfare with workfare and sometimes have a stronger preference for market solutions to traditional problems (as in pollution markets) while rejecting pure laissez-faire economics and other libertarian positions. The Third Way style of governing was firmly adopted and partly redefined in the United States during the presidency of Bill Clinton, developed in the aftermath of the disastrous 1994 midterms, and mirrored earlier classical liberal market concepts more than the robust social liberalism of presidents Roosevelt and Johnson. With respect to presidents, the term Third Way was introduced by political scientist Stephen Skowronek, who wrote The Politics presidents Make (1993, 1997; ISBN 0-674-68937-2). Third Way presidents "undermine the opposition by borrowing policies from it in an effort to seize the middle and with it to achieve political dominance. Think of Nixon's economic policies, which were a continuation of Johnson's "Great Society"; Clinton's welfare reform and support of capital punishment; and Obama's pragmatic centrism, reflected in his embrace, albeit very recent, of entitlements reform".

After Tony Blair came to power in the United Kingdom, Clinton, Blair and other leading Third Way adherents organized conferences in 1997 to promote the Third Way philosophy at Chequers in England. In 2004, several veteran Democrats founded a new think tank in Washington, D.C. called Third Way which bills itself as a "strategy center for progressives". Along with the Third Way think tank, the Democratic Leadership Council are also adherents of Third Way politics. The Third Way has been heavily criticized by many social democrats and other socialists, such as anarchists, communists, and democratic socialists, as a betrayal of left-wing values. The Democratic Leadership Council shut down in 2011. Commenting on the Democratic Leadership Council's waning influence, Politico characterized it as "the iconic centrist organization of the Clinton years" that "had long been fading from its mid-'90s political relevance, tarred by the left as a symbol of 'triangulation' at a moment when there's little appetite for intra-party warfare on the center-right". Specific definitions of Third Way policies may differ between Europe and the United States.

=== Return of protest politics ===
Al Gore voters protesting the Bush v. Gore (2000) U.S. Supreme Court decision at the inauguration of George W. Bush on January 20, 2001.

Republican and staunch conservative George W. Bush won the 2000 president election in a tightly contested race that included multiple recounts in the state of Florida. The outcome was tied up in courts for a month until reaching the Supreme Court. In the controversial ruling Bush v. Gore case on December 9, the Supreme Court reversed a Florida Supreme Court decision ordering a third recount, essentially ending the dispute and resulting in Bush winning the presidency by electoral vote, although he lost the popular vote to Democrat and incumbent Vice President Al Gore.

Bush's policies were deeply unpopular among American liberals, particularly his launching of the Iraq War which led to the return of massive protest politics in the form of opposition to the War in Iraq. Bush's approval rating went below the 50% mark in AP-Ipsos polling in December 2004. Thereafter, his approval ratings and approval of his handling of domestic and foreign policy issues steadily dropped. Bush received heavy criticism for his handling of the Iraq War, his response to Hurricane Katrina and to the Abu Ghraib prisoner abuse, NSA warrantless surveillance, the Plame affair and Guantanamo Bay detention camp controversies. Polls conducted in 2006 showed an average of 37% approval ratings for Bush which contributed to what Bush called the thumping of the Republican Party in the 2006 midterm elections.

When the financial system verged on total collapse during the 2008 financial crisis, Bush pushed through large-scale rescue packages for banks and auto companies that some conservatives in Congress did not support and led some conservative commentators to criticize Bush for enacting legislation they saw as not conservative and more reminiscent of New Deal liberal ideology. In part due to backlash against the Bush administration, Barack Obama, seen by some as a liberal and progressive, was elected to the presidency in 2008, the first African American to hold the office. With a clear Democratic majority in both Houses of Congress, Obama managed to pass a $814 billion stimulus spending program, new regulations on investment firms and a law to expand health insurance coverage. Led by the Tea Party movement, the Republicans won back control of one of the two Houses of Congress in the 2010 midterm elections.

In reaction to ongoing financial crisis that began in 2008, protest politics continued into the Obama administration, most notably in the form of Occupy Wall Street. The main issues are social and economic inequality, greed, corruption and the undue influence of corporations on government—particularly from the financial services sector. The Occupy Wall Street slogan "We are the 99%" addresses the growing income inequality and wealth distribution in the United States between the wealthiest 1% and the rest of the population. Although some of these were cited by liberal activists and Democrats, this information did not fully become a center of national attention until it was used as one of the ideas behind the movement itself. A survey by Fordham University Department of Political Science found the protester's political affiliations to be overwhelmingly left-leaning, with 25% Democrat, 2% Republican, 11% Socialist, 11% Green Party, 12% Other and 39% independent. While the survey also found that 80% of the protestors self-identified as slightly to extremely liberal, Occupy Wall Street and the broader Occupy movement has been variously classified as a "liberation from liberalism" and even as having principles that "arise from scholarship on anarchy".

During a news conference on October 6, 2011, President Obama said: "I think it expresses the frustrations the American people feel, that we had the biggest financial crisis since the Great Depression, huge collateral damage all throughout the country ... and yet you're still seeing some of the same folks who acted irresponsibly trying to fight efforts to crack down on the abusive practices that got us into this in the first place." Obama was re-elected President in November 2012, defeating Republican nominee Mitt Romney and sworn in for a second term on January 20, 2013. During his second term, Obama promoted domestic policies related to gun control in response to the Sandy Hook Elementary School shooting and called for full equality for LGBT Americans while his administration filed briefs which urged the Supreme Court to strike down the Defense of Marriage Act of 1996 and California's Proposition 8 as unconstitutional. The shooting of Michael Brown and death of Eric Garner led to widespread protests (particularly in Ferguson, where Brown was shot) against perceived police militarization more generally and alleged police brutality against African Americans more specifically.

=== 21st-century liberalism ===
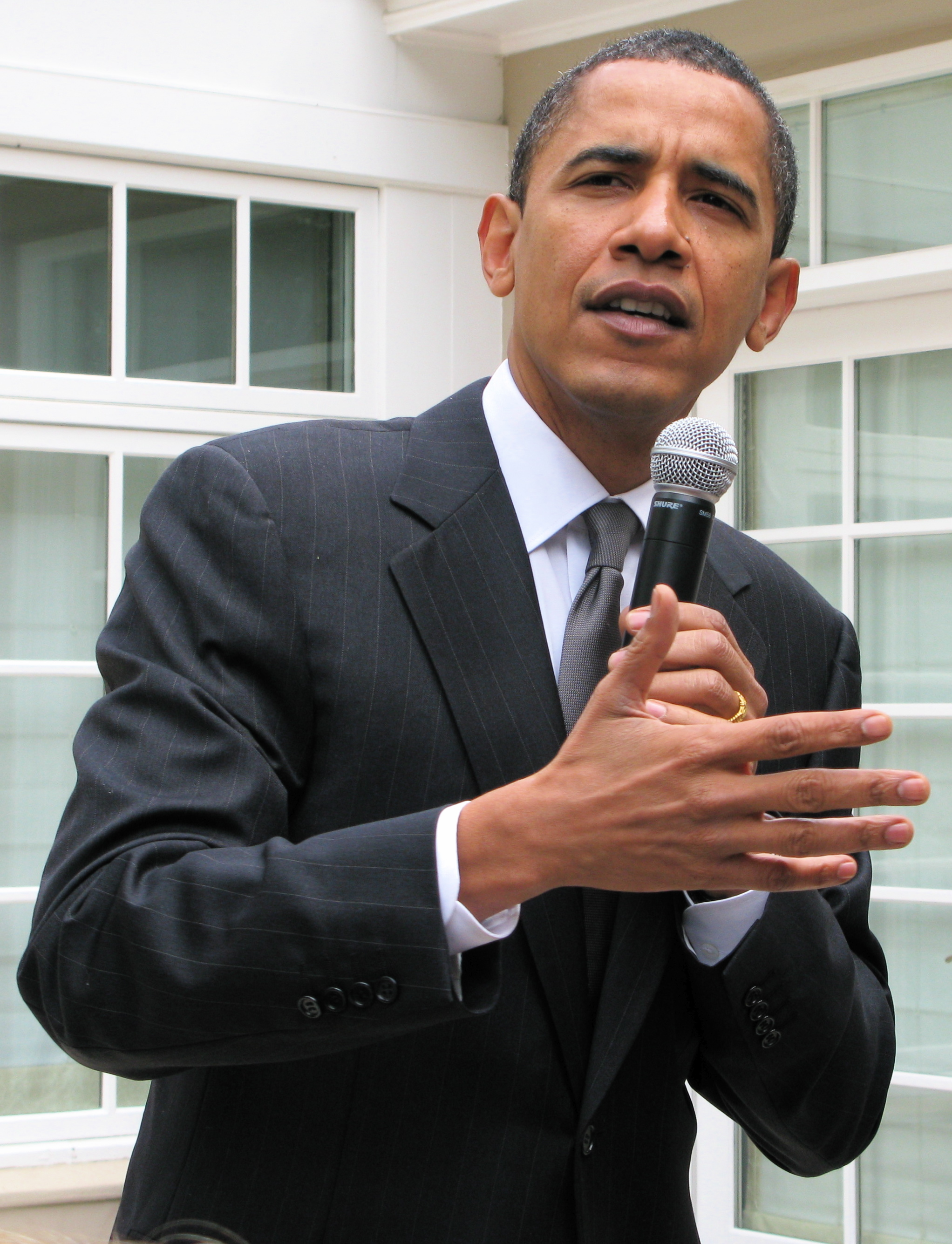
Barack Obama's victory in the 2008 presidential election saw a shift in the status quo of the Democratic Party platform, specifically on domestic issues such as health care reform, gun control, and LGBT rights.

21st-century modern liberalism in the US advocates for government intervention on social issues. This includes a recognized, legal access to abortion and other reproductive rights for women. Modern liberals also tend to support police reform through government action, and Democratic mayors have campaigned on reforms for police misconduct including police brutality. Furthermore, modern liberals have supported affirmative action for minority groups historically discriminated against, multilateralism and support for international institutions.

Another major social issue for modern liberals concerns LGBT rights. Starting in 2000, liberals have called for state recognition of gay marriage and anti-discrimination laws that for homosexuals. In 2009, crimes motivated by prejudice to sexual orientation became recognized as federal hate crimes under the presidency of Barack Obama. Gay marriage was legalized in the United States following the Supreme Court's decision in Obergefell v. Hodges and later codified by the Respect for Marriage Act, signed by President Joe Biden. Democrats and modern liberals reliably support transgender rights and have lobbied for anti-discrimination laws and expanded access to transgender healthcare.

On economic issues, modern liberals in the 21st century like their 20th century counterparts have called for greater regulation and oversight on businesses. As income inequality grows in the United States, modern liberals tend to support tax increases on the wealthy. Starting during the Obama administration, modern liberals have supported a system of universal healthcare for the United States and have made healthcare a major election issue.

In August 2022, President Joe Biden signed the Inflation Reduction Act, a climate and health care bill. The legislation included clean-energy spending, capped prescription drug costs for Medicare recipients and extended affordable care subsidies. The measures in the bill were to be paid for by new taxes on large corporations and increased IRS enforcement of wealthy individuals and entities.

== Philosophy ==
=== Free speech ===
American liberals describe themselves as open to change and receptive to new ideas. Liberals tend to oppose the Supreme Court's Citizens United ruling in 2010 that a corporation's First Amendment right to free speech encompasses freedom to make unlimited independent expenditures for any political party, politician or lobbyist as they see fit. President Obama called it "a major victory for big oil, Wall Street banks, health insurance companies and the other powerful interests that marshal their power every day in Washington to drown out the voices of everyday Americans."

=== Opposition to state socialism ===
In general, liberalism opposes socialism when it is understood to mean an alternative to capitalism based on state ownership of the means of production. American liberals usually doubt that bases for political opposition and freedom can survive when power is vested in the state as it was under state-socialist regimes. In line with the "general pragmatic, empirical basis" of liberalism, American liberal philosophy embraces the idea that if substantial abundance and equality of opportunity can be achieved through a system of mixed ownership, then there is no need for a rigid and oppressive bureaucracy. Since the 1950s, some liberal public intellectuals have moved further toward the allegation that free markets can provide better solutions than top-down economic planning when appropriately regulated. Economist Paul Krugman argued that in hitherto-state-dominated functions such as nation-scale energy distribution and telecommunications marketizations can improve efficiency dramatically. He also defended a monetary policy—inflation targeting—saying that it "most nearly approaches the usual goal of modern stabilization policy, which is to provide adequate demand in a clean, unobtrusive way that does not distort the allocation of resources." These distortions are of a kind that war-time and postwar Keynesian economists had accepted as an inevitable byproduct of fiscal policies that selectively reduced certain consumer taxes and directed spending toward government-managed stimulus projects, even where these economists theorized at a contentious distance from some of Keynes's own, more hands-off, positions which tended to emphasize stimulating of business investment. Thomas Friedman is a liberal journalist who generally defends free trade as more likely to improve the lot of both rich and poor countries.

=== Role of the state ===
There is a fundamental split among liberals as to the role of the state. Historian H. W. Brands observes that "the growth of the state is, by perhaps the most common definition, the essence of modern American liberalism." According to Paul Starr, "[l]iberal constitutions impose constraints on the power of any single public official or branch of government as well as the state as a whole."

=== Morality ===
According to cognitive linguist George Lakoff, liberal philosophy is based on five basic categories of morality. The first, the promotion of fairness, is generally described as an emphasis on empathy as a desirable trait. With this social contract based on the Golden Rule comes the rationale for many liberal positions. The second category is assistance to those who cannot assist themselves. A nurturing, philanthropic spirit is one that is considered good in liberal philosophy. This leads to the third category, namely the desire to protect those who cannot defend themselves. The fourth category is the importance of fulfilling one's life, allowing a person to experience all that they can. The fifth and final category is the importance of caring for oneself since only thus can one act to help others.

== Historiography ==
Liberalism increasingly shaped American intellectual life in the 1930s and 1940s, thanks in large part to two major two-volume studies that were widely read by academics, advanced students, intellectuals and the general public, namely Charles A. Beard and Mary Beard's The Rise of American Civilization (2 vol.; 1927) and Vernon L. Parrington's Main Currents in American Thought (2 vol.; 1927). The Beards exposed the material forces that shaped American history while Parrington focused on the material forces that shaped American literature. According to the Beards, virtually all political history involved the bitter conflict between the agrarians, farmers and workers led by the Jeffersonians and the capitalists led by the Hamiltonians. The Civil War marked a great triumph of the capitalists and comprised the Second American Revolution. Younger historians welcome the realistic approach that emphasized hardcore economic interest as a powerful force and downplayed the role of ideas. Parrington spoke to the crises at hand. According to historian Ralph Gabriel:

Main Currents attempted to trace the history of liberalism in the American scene for citizens who were caught in a desperate predicament. It was an age in which American liberalism set the United States, through the New Deal, on a Democratic middle-of-the-road course between the contemporary extremisms of Europe, that of Communism on one hand, and of Fascism on the other. ... The style of Main Currents was powered by Parrington's dedication to the cause of humane liberalism, by his ultimate humanistic, democratic faith. He saw the democratic dreams of the romantic first half of the 19th century as the climax of an epic story toward which early Americans moved and from which later Americans fell away.

Liberal readers immediately realized where they stood in the battle between Jeffersonian democracy and Hamiltonian privilege. Neither the Beards nor Parrington paid any attention to slavery, race relations, or minorities. For example, the Beards "dismissed the agitations of the abolitionists as a small direct consequence because of their lack of appeal to the public". Princeton historian Eric F. Goldman helped define American liberalism for postwar generations of university students. The first edition of his most influential work appeared in 1952 with the publication of Rendezvous with Destiny: A History of Modern American Reform, covering reform efforts from the Grant years to the 1950s. For decades, it was a staple of the undergraduate curriculum in history, highly regarded for its style and its exposition of modern American liberalism. According to Priscilla Roberts:

Lively, well-written, and highly readable, it provided an overview of eight decades of reformers, complete with arresting vignettes of numerous individuals, and stressed the continuities among successful American reform movements. Writing at the height of the Cold War, he also argued that the fundamental liberal tradition of the United States was moderate, centrist, and incrementalist, and decidedly non-socialist and non-totalitarian. While broadly sympathetic to the cause of American reform, Goldman was far from uncritical toward his subjects, faulting progressives of World War I for their lukewarm reception of the League of Nations, American reformers of the 1920s for their emphasis on freedom of lifestyles rather than economic reform, and those of the 1930s for overly tolerant attitude toward Soviet Russia. His views of past American reformers encapsulated the conventional, liberal, centrist orthodoxy of the early 1950s, from its support for anti-communism and international activism abroad and New Deal-style big government at home, to its condemnation of McCarthyism.

For the general public, Arthur M. Schlesinger Jr. was the most widely read historian, social critic and public intellectual. Schlesinger's work explored the history of Jacksonian era and especially 20th-century American liberalism. His major books focused on leaders such as Andrew Jackson, Franklin D. Roosevelt, John F. Kennedy and Robert F. Kennedy. He was a White House aide to Kennedy and his A Thousand Days: John F. Kennedy in the White House won the 1966 Pulitzer Prize. In 1968, Schlesinger wrote speeches for Robert F. Kennedy in 1968 and the biography Robert Kennedy and His Times. He later popularized the term imperial presidency, warning against excessive power in the White House as typified by Richard Nixon. Late in his career, he came to oppose multiculturalism.

== Criticism ==
Since the 1970s, there has been a concerted effort from both the left and right to color the word liberal with negative connotations. As those efforts succeeded more and more, progressives and their opponents took advantage of the negative meaning to great effect. In the 1988 presidential campaign, Republican George H. W. Bush joked about his opponent's refusal to own up to the "L-word label". When Michael Dukakis finally did declare himself a liberal, the Boston Globe headlined the story "Dukakis Uses L-Word". Conservative activists since the 1970s have employed liberal as an epithet, giving it an ominous or sinister connotation while invoking phrases like "free enterprise", "individual rights", "patriotic" and "the American way" to describe opponents of liberalism. Historian John Lukacs noted in 2004 that then-President George W. Bush, confident that many Americans regarded liberal as a pejorative term, used it to label his political opponents during campaign speeches while his opponents subsequently avoided identifying themselves as liberal.

During the presidency of Gerald Ford, First Lady Betty Ford became known for her candid and outspoken liberal views regarding the Equal Rights Amendment (ERA), pro-choice on abortion, feminism, equal pay, decriminalization of certain drugs, gun control and civil rights. She was a vocal supporter and leader in the women's movement and Ford was also noted for bringing breast cancer awareness to national attention following her 1974 mastectomy. Her outspoken liberal views led to ridicule and opposition from the conservative wing of the Republican Party and by conservative activists who referred to Ford as "No Lady" and thought her actions were unbecoming of a First Lady in an increasingly conservative Republican Party. Ronald Reagan's ridicule of liberalism is credited with transforming the word liberal into a derogatory epithet that any politician seeking national office would avoid. His speechwriters repeatedly contrasted "liberals" and "real Americans". For example, Reagan's then-Secretary of the Interior James G. Watt said: "I never use the words Republicans and Democrats. It's liberals and Americans". Reagan warned the United States of modern secularists who condoned abortion, excused teenage sexuality, opposed school prayer, and attenuated traditional American values. His conviction that there existed a single proper personal behavior, religious worldview, economic system, and proper attitude toward nations and peoples not supporting American interests worldwide is credited by comparative literature scholar Betty Jean Craige with polarizing the United States. Reagan persuaded a large portion of the public to dismiss any sincere analyses of his administration's policies as politically motivated criticisms put forth by what he labeled a liberal media.

When George H. W. Bush employed the word liberal as a derogatory epithet during his 1988 presidential campaign, he described himself as a patriot and described his liberal opponents as unpatriotic. Bush referred to liberalism as "the L-word" and sought to demonize opposing presidential candidate Michael Dukakis by labeling Dukakis "the liberal governor" and by pigeonholing him as part of what Bush called "the L-crowd". Bush recognized that motivating voters to fear Dukakis as a risky, non-mainstream candidate generated political support for his own campaign. Bush's campaign also used issues of prayer to arouse suspicions that Dukakis was less devout in his religious convictions. Bush's running mate, vice presidential candidate Dan Quayle, said to Christians at the 1988 Republican National Convention: "It's always good to be with people who are real Americans". Bill Clinton avoided association with liberal as a political label during his 1992 presidential campaign against Bush by moving closer to the political center.

=== Reactions to shift ===
Liberal Republicans have voiced disappointment over conservative attacks on liberalism. One example is former governor of Minnesota and founder of the Liberal Republican Club Elmer L. Andersen, who commented that it is "unfortunate today that 'liberal' is used as a derogatory term". After the 1980s, fewer activists and politicians were willing to characterize themselves as liberals. Historian Kevin Boyle explains: "There was a time when liberalism was, in Arthur Schlesinger's words 'a fighting faith'. ... Over the last three decades, though, liberalism has become an object of ridicule, condemned for its misplaced idealism, vilified for its tendency to equivocate and compromise, and mocked for its embrace of political correctness. Now even the most ardent reformers run from the label, fearing the damage it will inflict". Republican political consultant Arthur J. Finkelstein was recognized by Democratic political consultants for having employed a formula of branding someone as a liberal and engaging in name-calling by using the word liberal in negative television commercials as frequently as possible such as in a 1996 ad against Representative Jack Reed: "That's liberal. That's Jack Reed. That's wrong. Call liberal Jack Reed and tell him his record on welfare is just too liberal for you".

Democratic candidates and political liberals have sometimes shied away from the word liberal, in some cases identifying instead with terms such as progressive or moderate. George W. Bush and former Vice President Dick Cheney accused their opponents of liberal elitism, softness, and pro-terrorism. Conservative political commentators such as Rush Limbaugh consistently used the word "liberal" as a pejorative label. When liberals shifted to the word "progressive" to describe their beliefs, conservative radio host Glenn Beck used "progressive" as an abusive label. Historian Godfrey Hodgson notes the following: "The word liberal itself has fallen into disrepute. Nothing is too bad for conservative bloggers and columnists—let alone radio hosts—to say about liberals. Democrats themselves run a mile from the 'L word' for fear of being seen as dangerously outside the mainstream. Conservative politicians and publicists, by dint of associating liberals with all manner of absurdity, so that many sensible people hesitated to risk being tagged with the label of liberalism, succeeded in persuading the country that it was more conservative than it actually was".

=== Labels vs. beliefs ===
In 2008, media historian Eric Alterman argued that barely 20% of Americans are willing to accept the word liberal as a political label but that supermajorities of Americans favor liberal positions time and again. Alterman observes that resistance to the label liberal is not surprising due to billions of dollars poured into the denigration of the term. A 2004 poll conducted by the National Election Study found that only 35% of respondents questioned identifying as liberal compared to 55% identifying as conservative. A 2004 Pew poll found 19% of respondents identifying as liberal and 39% identifying as conservative, with the balance identifying as moderate. A 2006 poll found that 19% identified as liberal and 36% as conservative. In 2005, self-identifying moderates polled by Louis Harris & Associates were found to share essentially the same political beliefs as self-identifying liberals but rejected the word liberal because of the vilification heaped on the word itself by conservatives. Alterman acknowledges political scientist Drew Westen's observation that for most Americans the word liberal now carries meanings such as "elite", "tax and spend", and "out of touch".

== See also ==
- American Left
- Conservatism in the United States
- Economic interventionism
- List of American liberals
- Progressive talk radio
- Progressivism in the United States
- Socialism in the United States
- Social liberalism
