= List of American liberals =

American liberals are proponents of modern liberalism in the United States. This ideology combines ideas of civil liberty and equality with support for social justice and a mixed economy. According to Ian Adams, all major American parties are "liberal and always have been. Essentially they espouse classical liberalism, that is a form of democratized Whig constitutionalism plus the free market. The point of difference comes with the influence of social liberalism".

Economically, modern liberalism opposes cuts to the social safety net and supports a role for government in reducing inequality, providing education, ensuring access to healthcare, regulating economic activity and protecting the natural environment. This form of liberalism took shape in the 20th century United States as the franchise and other civil rights were extended to a larger class of citizens. Major examples include Theodore Roosevelt's Square Deal and New Nationalism, Woodrow Wilson's New Freedom, Franklin D. Roosevelt's New Deal, Harry S. Truman's Fair Deal, John F. Kennedy's New Frontier and Lyndon B. Johnson's Great Society.

In the first half of the 20th century, both major American parties had a conservative and a liberal wing. The conservative Northern Republicans and Southern Democrats formed the conservative coalition which dominated the Congress in the pre-Civil Rights era. As the Democrats under President Johnson began to support civil rights, the formerly Solid South, meaning solidly Democratic, became solidly Republican, except in districts with a large number of African-American voters. Since the 1960s, the Democratic Party has been considered liberal and the Republican Party has been considered conservative. As a group, liberals are referred to as the left and conservatives as the right. Starting in the 21st century, there has also been a sharp division between liberals who tend to live in denser, more heterogeneous communities and conservatives who tend to live in less dense, more homogeneous communities.

== Politicians ==
- Senator Benjamin Wade (1800-1878), Republican Senator from Ohio
- Governor John C. Frémont (1813-1890), Republican Presidential Candidate in 1856
- Representative Henry Winter Davis (1817-1865), Republican Representative from Maryland
- Secretary William Jennings Bryan (1860-1925), Democratic Presidential Candidate in 1896, 1900, and 1908.
- President Woodrow Wilson (1856–1924), Democratic president from 1913 to 1921
- Governor and Senator Robert M. La Follette from Wisconsin (1855–1925), Republican and Progressive (1924 presidential nominee)
- Senator George W. Norris (1861–1944), Republican and independent from Nebraska
- Governor and Senator Hiram Johnson (1866–1945), Republican and Progressive from California
- Senator Robert F. Wagner (1877–1953), Democrat from New York
- President Franklin D. Roosevelt (1882–1945), Democratic president from 1933 to 1945
- Mayor Fiorello H. La Guardia (1882–1947), Republican Mayor of New York City
- President Harry S. Truman (1884–1972), Democratic president from 1945 to 1953
- Vice President Henry A. Wallace (1888–1965), Democratic vice president from 1941 to 1945 and 1948 Progressive Party presidential nominee
- Harry Hopkins (1890–1946), Democratic adviser of President Franklin Roosevelt
- Governor and Chief Justice Earl Warren (1891–1974), Republican from California
- Governor Adlai E. Stevenson (1900–1965), Democratic Governor of Illinois and 1952 and 1956 Democratic presidential nominee
- Mayor Richard J. Daley, Chicago (1902–1976), Democrat
- Governor Thomas E. Dewey, New York (1902-1971), Republican Presidential Candidate in 1944 and 1948.
- Senator Ralph Yarborough, Texas (1903–1996), Democrat
- Senator Jacob K. Javits, New York (1904–1986), Republican
- President Lyndon B. Johnson (1908–1973), Democratic president from 1963 to 1969
- Vice President Nelson Rockefeller (1908–1979), Republican vice president from 1974 to 1977
- Representative Adam Clayton Powell Jr. (1908–1972), Democrat from New York
- Vice President Hubert Humphrey (1911–1978), Democratic vice president from 1965 to 1969 and 1968 Democratic presidential nominee
- Speaker Thomas "Tip" O'Neill (1912–1994), Democrat from Massachusetts
- President John F. Kennedy (1917–1963), Democratic president from 1961 to 1963
- Mayor Tom Bradley, Los Angeles (1917–1998), Democratic mayor from 1973 to 1993
- Representative Bella Abzug (1920–1998), Democrat from New York and one of the founders of the National Women's Political Caucus
- Mayor John Lindsay, New York City (1921–2000), Republican and who switched to the Democratic Party
- Senator George McGovern, South Dakota (1922–2012), 1972 Democratic presidential nominee
- President Jimmy Carter (1924–2024), Democratic president from 1977 to 1981
- Senator Robert F. Kennedy (1925–1968), Democrat from New York
- Senator Daniel Patrick Moynihan (1927–2003), Democrat from New York
- Senator Arlen Specter (1930–2012), Republican, later Democrat from Pennsylvania
- Vice President Walter Mondale (1928–2021), Democratic vice president from 1977 to 1981 and 1984 Democratic presidential nominee
- Supervisor and Councilman Zev Yaroslavsky (born 1948), Democrat from California, member of the Los Angeles County Board of Supervisors from 1994 to 2014, member of the Los Angeles City Council from 1975 to 1994
- Senator Ted Kennedy, Massachusetts (1932–2009), Democrat
- Governor Mario Cuomo, New York (1932–2015), Democrat
- Representative Barbara Jordan, Texas (1936–1996), Democrat
- Governor Jerry Brown (born 1938), Democrat from California
- Representative John Lewis (1940–2020), Democrat from Georgia
- Speaker Nancy Pelosi (born 1940), Democrat from California
- Representative Barney Frank (1940–2026), Democrat from Massachusetts
- President Joe Biden (born 1942), Democratic president from 2021 to 2025, Democratic vice president from 2009 to 2017, Democratic senator from Delaware
- Senator Paul Wellstone (1944–2002), Democrat from Minnesota
- Representative Dennis Kucinich (born 1946), Democrat from Ohio
- President Bill Clinton (born 1946), Democratic president from 1993 to 2001
- Secretary Hillary Clinton (born 1947), first lady from 1993 to 2001, Secretary of State from 2009 to 2013 and 2016 Democratic presidential nominee
- Governor Howard Dean (born 1948), Democrat from Vermont
- Vice President Al Gore (born 1948), Democrat from Tennessee
- Senator Elizabeth Warren (born 1949), Democrat from Massachusetts
- Senator Al Franken (born 1951), Democrat from Minnesota
- Senator Russ Feingold (born 1953), Democrat from Wisconsin
- Senator Amy Klobuchar (born 1960), Democrat from Minnesota
- President Barack Obama (born 1961), Democratic president from 2009 to 2017
- Vice President Kamala Harris (born 1964), Democrat from California
- Congressman Beto O'Rourke (born 1972), Democrat from Texas
- Mayor and Secretary Pete Buttigieg (born 1982), Democrat from Indiana

== Intellectuals ==
- Lester Frank Ward (1841–1913), sociologist
- Thorstein Veblen (1857–1929), economist
- John Dewey (1859–1952), philosopher
- Herbert Croly (1869–1930), political scientist
- Vernon Louis Parrington (1871–1929), historian
- Charles A. Beard (1874–1948), historian
- Alvin Hansen (1887–1975), economist
- Reinhold Niebuhr (1892–1971), theologian
- Henry Steele Commager (1902–1998), historian
- Lionel Trilling (1905–1975), literary critic
- John Kenneth Galbraith (1908–2006), economist
- Alfred Kazin (1915–1998), literary critic and writer
- Richard Hofstadter (1916–1970), historian
- Eric F. Goldman (1916–1989), historian
- Arthur Schlesinger Jr. (1917–2007), historian
- John Rawls (1921–2002), philosopher
- William Appleman Williams (1921–1990), historian
- Richard Rorty (1931–2007), philosopher
- Garry Wills (born 1934), historian
- Robert Reich (born 1946), economist
- Roberto Unger (born 1947), philosopher
- Amy Gutmann (born 1949), political scientist
- Henry Louis Gates (born 1950), historian
- Paul Krugman (born 1953), economist
- Melissa Harris-Perry (born 1972), African-American scholar

== Jurists and the law ==
- Justice John Marshall Harlan (1833-1911)
- Justice Louis Brandeis (1856–1941)
- Chief Justice Earl Warren (1891–1974)
- Justice William O. Douglas (1898–1980)
- Justice William J. Brennan Jr. (1906–1997)
- Justice Thurgood Marshall (1908–1993)
- Judge A. Leon Higginbotham Jr. (1928–1998)
- Ronald Dworkin (1931–2013), jurisprudence
- John Hart Ely (1938–2003), jurisprudence
- Laurence Tribe (born 1941), jurisprudence
- Harold Koh (born 1954), jurisprudence
- Pamela Karlan (born 1959), jurisprudence
- Jeffrey Toobin (born 1960), lawyer, legal analyst and author

== Writers, activists and commentators ==
- Samuel Gompers (1850–1924), labor leader, founder and first president of the American Federation of Labor
- Jane Addams (1860–1935), social worker and activist
- William Monroe Trotter (1872–1934), civil rights leader and founder of the Boston Guardian
- Edith Abbott (1876–1957), economist and social worker
- Eleanor Roosevelt (1884–1962), writer, Democratic leader, First Lady from 1933 to 1945 and wife of Franklin D. Roosevelt
- Rachel Carson (1907–1964), environmentalist
- Walter Reuther (1907–1970), leader in American labor movement and civil rights movement
- Fannie Lou Hamer (1917–1977), voting and civil rights activist
- Betty Friedan (1921–2006), feminist and first president of the National Organization for Women
- Gore Vidal (1925–2012), author
- Coretta Scott King (1927–2006), Black leader
- Cesar Chávez (1927–1993), Chicano leader
- Harvey Milk (1930–1978), gay rights activist
- Betty Ford (1918–2011), First Lady from 1974 to 1977, feminist and women's rights activist
- George Soros (born 1930), financier and philanthropist
- Susan Sontag (1933–2004), writer
- Gloria Steinem (1934–2026), feminist
- Bill Moyers (1934–2025), journalist and political commentator
- Bill Press (born 1940), journalist and political commentator
- Jim Hightower (born 1943), columnist, author and activist
- Faye Wattleton (born 1943), feminist
- James Carville (born 1944), political commentator
- Patricia Ireland (born 1945), feminist
- Arianna Huffington (born 1950), political commentator
- Lawrence O'Donnell (born 1951), political commentator
- Michael Moore (born 1954), filmmaker
- Bill Maher (born 1956), comedian and political commentator
- Keith Olbermann (born 1959), journalist and political commentator
- Katrina vanden Heuvel (born 1959), journalist and political commentator
- Tavis Smiley (born 1964), political commentator
- Cenk Uygur (born 1970), radio host and political commentator
- Markos Moulitsas (born 1971), blogger and activist
- Rachel Maddow (born 1973), political commentator
- Stacey Abrams (born 1973), civil rights activist
- Shaun King (born 1979), civil rights activist
- Linda Sarsour (born 1980), civil rights activist
- Matthew Yglesias (born 1981), blogger and journalist
- Dena Takruri (born 1983), journalist and reporter
- Ezra Klein (born 1984), columnist and blogger
- Ana Kasparian (born 1986), political commentator

== Religious leaders ==
- Anna Pauline Murray (1910–1985), minister, lawyer and civil rights activist
- Arthur Waskow (1933–2025), rabbi, political activist and author
- Jesse Jackson (1941–2026), minister and civil rights activist
- Michael Lerner (born 1943), rabbi and political activist
- David Saperstein (born 1947) rabbi and political activist
- Jim Wallis (born 1948), evangelical pastor, founder and editor of Sojourners
- Al Sharpton (born 1954), minister and civil rights activist
- William Barber (born 1963), minister and activist
- Lennox Yearwood (born 1969), minister and activist
- Harold Schulweis (1925–2014), rabbi and author

== Blogs ==
- AlterNet
- Daily Kos
- Firedoglake
- HuffPost
- Talking Points Memo
- Salon
- ThinkProgress

== Magazines and publications ==
- The American Prospect
- The Atlantic
- Mother Jones
- The Nation
- The New Republic
- Rolling Stone
- Sojourners

== Think tanks ==
- Center for American Progress
- Roosevelt Institute
- Center on Budget and Policy Priorities

== See also ==
- List of American conservatives
- List of American libertarians
