= The Techniques of Democracy =

1942 book by Alfred Bingham

The Techniques of Democracy is a book written by Alfred Bingham. It was published in 1943 by New York City publishers Duell, Sloan and Pearce. In this book, Bingham argues against both dogmatic individualism and dogmatic socialism.
