= Political positions of Theodore Roosevelt =

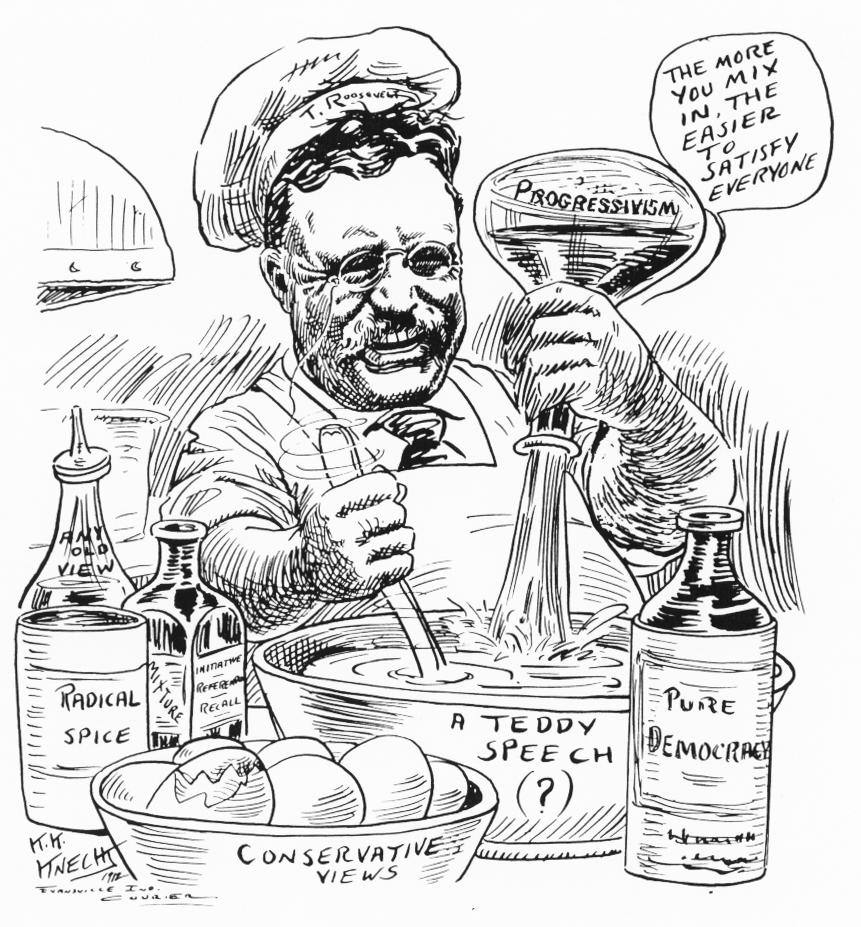
1912 editorial cartoon of Roosevelt by Karl K. Knecht

Theodore Roosevelt (1858–1919) served as the president of the United States (1901–1909). He also served as the vice president of the United States (1901) and governor of New York (1899–1900). He was defeated in the 1912 United States presidential election. By 1907 he was denouncing "Malefactors of Great Wealth" (big business) and attacking the courts as too beholden to business. He split with his chosen presidential successor William Howard Taft and in 1912 tried and failed to stop more conservative Republicans from renominating Taft and taking control of the party. Instead he created a new party with a platform that presaged the liberalism of the New Deal Democrats of the 1930s. In terms of foreign policy, however, Roosevelt appealed to conservatives by promoting nationalism, imperialism (as in the Philippines), using force to obtain control of the Panama Canal, and building a powerful world-class navy.

In domestic policy Roosevelt called for a "square deal" for the American people, with four major themes issuing from much more powerful national government. In connection with conservation, Roosevelt removed 194 million acres of land from commercial use turning them into national forests and parks. With corporate regulation, his aggressive efforts to limit the power of giant corporations and trusts earned Roosevelt the nickname "The Trust-Buster". As far as consumer protection was concerned, The Square Deal led to the passage of major new forms of regulation such as the Pure Food and Drug Act and the Federal Meat Inspection Act in 1906, which aimed to improve food safety and protect consumers. With labor rights, Roosevelt supported workers' rights to form unions and receive compensation for work-related injuries in federal workplaces. When President Taft was too conservative Roosevelt broke with him and the Republican Party, allowing the Democrat Woodrow Wilson to win in 1912. Wilson, a champion of liberalism, won reelection in 1916 by winning over many of the Square Deal Roosevelt supporters. In March 1918, in one of his last speeches, Roosevelt arguably foreshadowed the New Deal "by advocating aid to farmers, multipurpose river valley developments, public housing projects, reductions in the hours of labor, and sundry social security measures including old age, sickness, and unemployment insurance."

== Notable Achievements and Recommendations ==
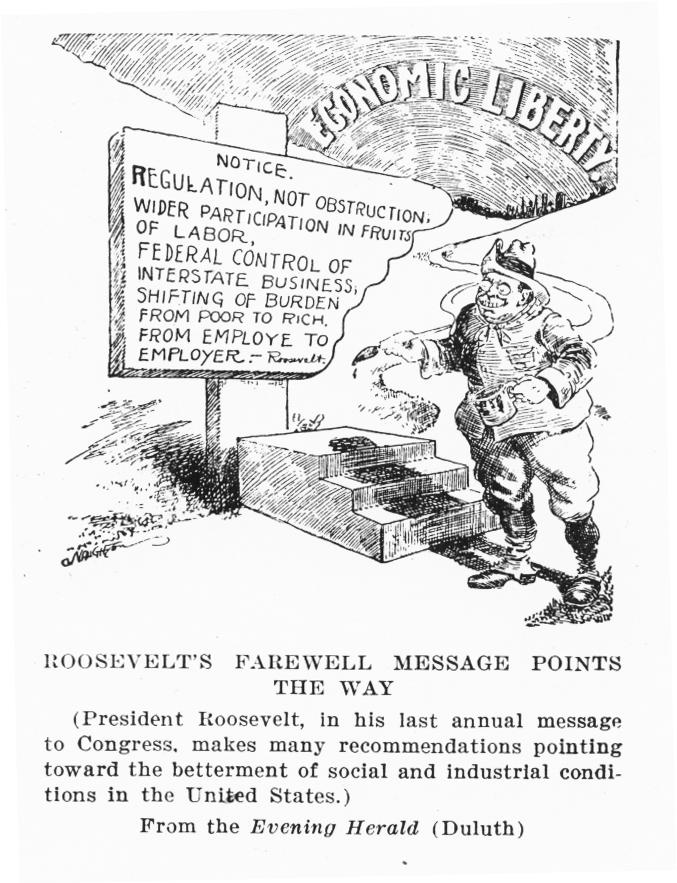
In his waning days in office, Roosevelt proposed numerous reforms.

The book Theodore Roosevelt's Confession of Faith Before the Progressive National Convention lists the following 33 past achievements and 8 recommendations for the future from Roosevelt himself:

1 Extension of Forest Reserve
2 National Irrigation Act
3 Improvement of waterways and reservation of water power
4 Hepburn Rate Act
5 Employers Liability Act
6 Safety Appliance Act
7 Regulation of railroad employees hours of labor
8 Establishment of Department of Commerce and Labor
9 Pure Food and Drugs Act
10 Federal meat inspection
11 Inspection of packing houses
12 Navy nearly doubled in tonnage and greatly increased in efficiency
13 Battle ship fleet sent around the world
14 State militia brought into co ordination with army
15 Canal Zone acquired and work of excavation pushed with increased energy
16 Development of civil self government in insular possessions
17 Second intervention in Cuba Cuba restored to the Cubans
18 Finances of Santo Domingo straightened out
19 Alaska boundary dispute settled with Great Britain and Canada
20 Reorganization of the Consular Service
21 Settlement of the coal strike of 1902
22 The Government upheld in Northern Securities decision
23 Conviction of post office grafters and public land thieves
24 Directed investigation of the Sugar Trust custom frauds and the resultant prosecutions
25 Directed prosecution of railroads and other corporations for violation of Sherman Anti Trust Law (the Harriman, Tobacco, and Standard Oil suits)
26 Keeping the door of China open to American commerce
27 Bringing about the settlement of the Russo Japanese war by the Treaty of Portsmouth
28 Called a conference on the welfare of dependent children
29 Negotiating twenty four treaties of general arbitration
30 Reduction of interest bearing debt by more than $90,000,000
31 Avoiding the question of tariff revision
32 Inauguration of movement for conservation of natural resources
33 Inauguration of movement for improvement of conditions of country life
1 Reform of the financial system
2 Inheritance tax
3 Calling for an Income tax
4 Passage of a new employers liability act to meet objections raised by the Supreme Court
5 Parcels post
6 Revision of the Sherman Anti Trust Act
7 Legislation to prevent over capitalization stock watering etc of common carriers
8 Legislation compelling incorporation under Federal laws of corporations engaged in interstate commerce

== Square Deal ==
The term "square deal" was in common use by the 1890s and Roosevelt occasionally used it. However in 1910, opposing Taft, he called his platform the "Square Deal".

— Practical equality of opportunity for all citizens, when we achieve it, will have two great results. First, every man will have a fair chance to make of himself all that in him lies; to reach the highest point to which his capacities, unassisted by special privilege of his own and unhampered by the special privilege of others, can carry him, and to get for himself and his family substantially what he has earned. Second, equality of opportunity means that the commonwealth will get from every citizen the highest service of which he is capable. No man who carries the burden of the special privileges of another can give to the commonwealth that service to which it is fairly entitled.
— I stand for the square deal. But when I say that I am for the square deal, I mean not merely that I stand for fair play under the present rules of the game, but that I stand for having those rules changed so as to work for a more substantial equality of opportunity and of reward for equally good service ... When I say I want a square deal for the poor man, I do not mean that I want a square deal for the man who remains poor because he has not got the energy to work for himself. If a man who has had a chance will not make good, then he has got to quit ... Now, this means that our government, National and State, must be freed from the sinister influence or control of special interests. Exactly as the special interests of cotton and slavery threatened our political integrity before the Civil War, so now the great special business interests too often control and corrupt the men and methods of government for their own profit. We must drive the special interests out of politics ... For every special interest is entitled to justice, but not one is entitled to a vote in Congress, to a voice on the bench, or to representation in any public office. The Constitution guarantees protection to property, and we must make that promise good. But it does not give the right of suffrage to any corporation. The true friend of property, the true conservative, is he who insists that property shall be the servant and not the master of the commonwealth; who insists that the creature of man's making shall be the servant and not the master of the man who made it. The citizens of the United States must effectively control the mighty commercial forces which they have themselves called into being.

== New Nationalism and judicial review ==
In 1910, Roosevelt embodied his strong belief in social justice in his proposals for a "New Nationalism." He believed that human welfare was more important than property rights. He insisted that only a powerful federal government could regulate the economy and guarantee justice, and that a president can succeed in making his economic agenda successful only if he makes the protection of human welfare his highest priority. In terms of politics, his ideas were eagerly endorsed by progressives in the West, and denounced by conservative Republicans in the East. This was frustrating to Roosevelt who realized the Republican Party must unite in order to win the presidency.

On August 31, 1910 at Osawatomie, Kansas, Roosevelt announced his "New Nationalism" policies in a dramatic move to the left. Recalling the Civil War he said America faced a new war, "between the men who possess more than they have earned and the men who have earned more than they possess." He said working class deserved much more than they were getting from business. "The great special business interests too often control and corrupt the men and methods of government for their own profit. We must drive the special interests out of politics."

In terms of policy, Roosevelt's platform included a broad range of social and political reforms advocated by progressives. According to Nathan Miller, in his Osawatomie speech:

Foreshadowing the modern welfare state, he advocated positive action by the national government to advance equality of opportunity, justice, and security for all. Graduated income and inheritance taxes, a revamped financial system, a comprehensive workmen's compensation law, a commission of experts to regulate the tariff, limitations on the political activities of corporations, the tariff, limitations on the political activities of corporations, stringent new conservation laws, and regulation of child labor were all parts of his grab a bag of reforms.

Professor Richard Heffner of Rutgers University noted about Roosevelt that his New Nationalism "sought Social Justice by extending the powers of the central government", which Roosevelt believed to be the steward of the public welfare.

What was especially controversial at Osawatomie was Roosevelt's attack on "the purely negative activity of the judiciary in forbidding the State to exercise power." The judicial system was rigged whereby federal judges were able to declare good laws unconstitutional. "This New Nationalism regards the executive power as the steward of the public welfare. It demands of the judiciary that it shall be interested primarily in human welfare rather than in property." He added, "More direct action by the people in their own affairs under proper safeguards is vitally necessary." There was much talk in 1910 about ways for voters to recall or reverse judicial decisions. His policy was a to expand presidential power while limiting judicial power. President Taft—and many lawyers—became alarmed. Taft told his brother, “I think the ‘New Nationalism’ proclaimed in the Osawatomie speech has frightened every lawyer in the United States and has greatly stirred up the indignation and fear of the thinking part of New England and the Middle States."

== Conservation of natural resources ==
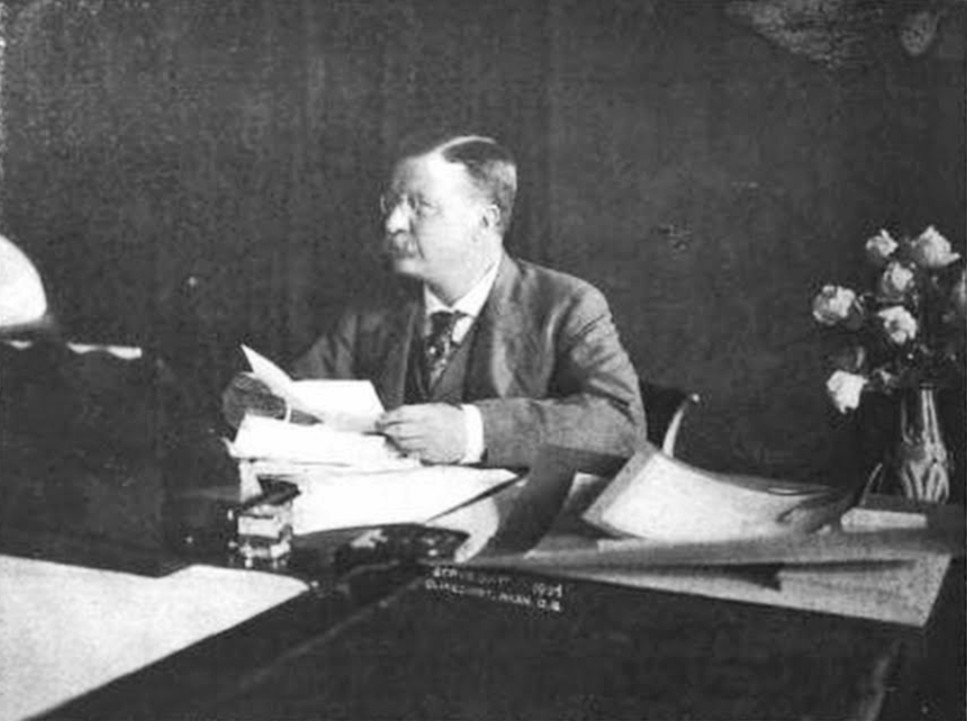
Roosevelt wrote his own speeches.

In a speech that Roosevelt gave at Osawatomie, Kansas on August 31, 1910, he outlined his views on conservation of the lands of the United States:

Conservation means development as much as it does protection. I recognize the right and duty of this generation to develop and use the natural resources of our land but I do not recognize the right to waste them, or to rob, by wasteful use, the generations that come after us. I ask nothing of the nation except that it so behave as each farmer here behaves with reference to his own children. That farmer is a poor creature who skins the land and leaves it worthless to his children. The farmer is a good farmer who, having enabled the land to support himself and to provide for the education of his children, leaves it to them a little better than he found it himself. I believe the same thing of a nation.

Moreover, I believe that the natural resources must be used for the benefit of all our people, and not monopolized for the benefit of the few, and here again is another case in which I am accused of taking a revolutionary attitude. People forget now that one hundred years ago there were public men of good character who advocated the nation selling its public lands in great quantities, so that the nation could get the most money out of it, and giving it to the men who could cultivate it for their own uses. We took the proper democratic ground that the land should be granted in small sections to the men who were actually to till it and live on it. Now, with the water-power, with the forests, with the mines, we are brought face to face with the fact that there are many people who will go with us in conserving the resources only if they are to be allowed to exploit them for their benefit. That is one of the fundamental reasons why the special interests should be driven out of politics.

Of all the questions which can come before this nation, short of the actual preservation of its existence in a great war, there is none which compares in importance with the great central task of leaving this land even a better land for our descendants than it is for us, and training them into a better race to inhabit the land and pass it on. Conservation is a great moral issue, for it involves the patriotic duty of insuring the safety and continuance of the nation. Let me add that the health and vitality of our people are at least as well worth conserving as their forests, waters, lands, and minerals, and in this great work the national government must bear most important part.

== Regulation of big business ==
In 1903, at the urging of President Roosevelt, Congress passed into law the creation of the Bureau of Corporations.

In 1906 and for the first time in American history, through the Hepburn Act, the power to enact price controls was passed into law. The act was strongly endorsed by the President, and its enactment was considered a major legislative victory for the Roosevelt Administration.

In the Eighth Annual Message to Congress (1908), Roosevelt mentioned the need for federal government to regulate interstate corporations using the Interstate Commerce Clause, also mentioning how these corporations fought federal control by appealing to states' rights:

— Of course there are many sincere men who now believe in unrestricted individualism in business, just as there were formerly many sincere men who believed in slavery – that is, in the unrestricted right of an individual to own another individual. These men do not by themselves have great weight, however. The effective fight against adequate government control and supervision of individual, and especially of corporate, wealth engaged in interstate business is chiefly done under cover; and especially under cover of an appeal to States' rights. ... The chief reason, among the many sound and compelling reasons, that led to the formation of the National Government was the absolute need that the Union, and not the several States, should deal with interstate and foreign commerce; and the power to deal with interstate commerce was granted absolutely and fully to the central government ... The proposal to make the National Government supreme over, and therefore to give it complete control over, the railroads and other instruments of interstate commerce is merely a proposal to carry out to the letter one of the prime purposes, if not the prime purpose, for which the Constitution was founded. It does not represent centralization. It represents merely the acknowledgement of the patent fact that centralization has already come in business ...
— I believe that the more far-sighted corporations are themselves coming to recognize the unwisdom of the violent hostility they have displayed during the last few years to regulation and control by the National Government of combinations [monopolies] engaged in interstate business. The truth is that we who believe in this movement of asserting and exercising a genuine control, in the public interest, over these great corporations have to contend against two sets of enemies, who, though nominally opposed to one another, are really allies in preventing a proper solution of the problem. There are, first, the big corporation men, and the extreme individualists among business men, who genuinely believe in utterly unregulated business – that is, in the reign of plutocracy; and, second, the men who, being blind to the economic movements of the day, believe in a movement of repression rather than of regulation of corporations, and who denounce both the power of the railroads and the exercise of the Federal power which alone can really control the railroads.

After his term as president concluded, Roosevelt worked to publish an autobiography. In his autobiography, Roosevelt explained his belief on the issue. He wrote:

I have always believed that it would also be necessary to give the National Government complete power over the organization and capitalization of all business concerns engaged in inter-State commerce.

As one historian has noted about Roosevelt: “While fundamentally conservative, he had no love for the big businessmen whose unprincipled behavior, he thought, threatened the capitalist system.”

== Views on colonization and imperialism ==
In The Winning of the West (1889–1896), Roosevelt's frontier thesis stressed a struggle between "civilization" and "savagery." Excerpts:

1. "The settler and pioneer have at bottom had justice on their side; this great continent could not have been kept as nothing but a game preserve for squalid savages"
2. "The most ultimately righteous of all wars is a war with savages, though it is apt to be also the most terrible and inhuman"
3. "American and Indian, Boer and Zulu, Cossack and Tartar, New Zealander and Maori, – in each case the victor, horrible though many of his deeds are, has laid deep the foundations for the future greatness of a mighty people"
4. "it is of incalculable importance that America, Australia, and Siberia should pass out of the hands of their red, black, and yellow aboriginal owners, and become the heritage of the dominant world races"
5. "The world would have halted had it not been for the Teutonic conquests in alien lands; but the victories of Moslem over Christian have always proved a curse in the end. Nothing but sheer evil has come from the victories of Turk and Tartar"

== Positions on immigration, minorities, civil rights, and eugenics ==
=== Immigration policy ===
As president, Roosevelt agreed to concessions whereby the United States would not impose restrictions on Japanese immigration and Japan would not allow further emigration to the United States, which was known as the "Gentlemen's Agreement".

In 1894, Roosevelt wrote:

"We must Americanize in every way, in speech, in political ideas and principles, and in their way of looking at relations between church and state. We welcome the German and the Irishman who becomes an American. We have no use for the German or Irishman who remains such ... He must revere only our flag, not only must it come first, but no other flag should even come second".

In 1907, Roosevelt wrote, "We have room for but one language in this country, and that is the English language, for we intend to see that the crucible turns our people out as Americans, of American nationality, and not as dwellers in a polyglot boarding house."

During World War I, he was vehemently opposed to what he called "hyphenated Americans," denouncing the German-Americans and Irish-Americans. They demanded neutrality and opposed support for the British cause. Roosevelt said they were not true Americans. In a speech to the lay Catholic organization. Knights of Columbus—with its German and Irish membership, he said in 1915:

The men who do not become Americans and nothing else are hyphenated Americans; and there ought to be no room for them in this country. The man who calls himself an American citizen and who yet shows by his actions that he is primarily the citizen of a foreign land, plays a thoroughly mischievous part in the life of our body politic. He has no place here; and the sooner he returns to the land to which he feels his real heart-allegiance, the better it will be for every good American.

After the U.S. declared war in April 1917, Roosevelt grew more agitated. In a speech delivered on July 4, 1917, he questioned immigrants' loyalty to their new country during the war. He accused politicians who voted against war of appeasing German-American voters. Roosevelt said "pacifists" who supported Germany were traitors to the United States. He called for 100 percent allegiance to America by anyone living in the country, emphasizing the need for universal military service as an act of patriotism. Over and over he denounced "hyphenated Americans," a term specifically targeting German-Americans and Irish-Americans who had called for American neutrality instead of aid to Britain.

=== Minorities and Civil Rights ===
On August 13 and 14, 1906, Brownsville, Texas was the site of the Brownsville affair. Racial tensions were high between white townsfolk and black infantrymen stationed at Fort Brown. On the night of August 13, one white bartender was killed and a white police officer was wounded by rifle shots in the street. Townsfolk, including the mayor, accused the infantrymen of the murders. The soldiers kept silent and refused a direct order to tell what happened. Roosevelt dishonorably discharged the entire 167-member regiment due to their "conspiracy of silence". Further investigations in the 1970s found that the black infantrymen were not at fault for the shooting and the Nixon administration reversed all of the dishonorable discharges.

On the other hand, Roosevelt felt that equality for the black race would come through progress from one generation to the next. For this, he was lauded by liberal whites and was received as the usher of a new era in the black community. William McGill, a black preacher in Tennessee, wrote: "The administration of President Roosevelt is to the Negro what the heart is to the body. It has pumped lifeblood into every artery of the Negro in this country". Pope Leo XIII remarked approvingly of Roosevelt's determination "to seek equality of treatment of all the races".

Roosevelt wrote to a friend regarding the difficult issue of race relations, "I have not been able to think out any solution of the terrible problem offered by the presence of the Negro on this continent, but of one thing I am sure, and that is that inasmuch as he is here and can neither be killed nor driven away, the only wise and honorable and Christian thing to do is to treat each black man and each white man strictly on his merits as a man, giving him no more and no less than he shows himself worthy to have". Additionally, Roosevelt risked outrage (and perhaps physical harm) while speaking to a heavily armed crowd in Butte, Montana during his 1903 Western tour: "I fought beside colored troops at Santiago [Cuba], and I hold that if a man is good enough to be put up and shot at then he is good enough for me to do what I can to get him a square deal".

In spite of his numerous accomplishments when it came to race relations, Roosevelt, as well as many Progressives of that era, still had an overall condescending and paternalistic view of African Americans. In private, Roosevelt still used racial epithets and in a letter to his friend Owen Wister, Roosevelt wrote that:

Now as to the negroes! I entirely agree with you that as a race and in the mass they are altogether inferior to the whites. Your small German scientific friend had probably not heard of the latest scientific theory-doubtless itself to be superseded by others-which is that the negro and the white man as shown by their skulls, are closely akin, and taken together, differ widely from the round skulled Mongolian.

Roosevelt believed that Jim Crow was a better solution than turmoil, and Roosevelt once stated that “The white man who can be of most use to the colored man is the colored man's neighbor. It is the southern people themselves who must and can solve the difficulties that exist in the South”. Additionally, he wrote in the North American Review that "A perfectly stupid race can never rise to a very high plane; the negro, for instance, has been kept down as much by lack of intellectual development as by anything else." However, Roosevelt did believe that environment and culture could modify one's heredity. Roosevelt did appoint “colored men of good repute and standing” to some federal jobs.

Regardless of his paternalism, Roosevelt's attitudes towards African Americans contrasted heavily to those of others in his time, who accused him of "mingling and mongrelization" of the white race; notably Democratic Senator Benjamin Tillman of South Carolina, who commented on Roosevelt's dining with Booker T. Washington: "The action of President Roosevelt in entertaining that nigger will necessitate our killing a thousand niggers in the South before they learn their place again".

=== Race suicide and eugenics ===
Roosevelt was intensely active in warning against race suicide, and held a Neo-Lamarkist viewpoint. When Roosevelt used the word 'race', he meant the entirety of the human race or Americans as one race and culture. Americans, he repeatedly said, were getting too soft and having too few children and were thus dying out. While he agreed with some of the ideas of eugenics, he strongly opposed the core eugenics movement principle that some people should have fewer children. As historian Thomas Dyer explains, Roosevelt, "Strenuously dissented from the ideas which contravened the race suicide..... And categorically rejected any measure which would not produce enough children to maintain racial integrity and national preeminence." Roosevelt attacked the fundamental axioms of eugenics, warning against "twisted eugenics".

In 1914 he said: "I wish very much that the wrong people could be prevented entirely from breeding; and when the evil nature of these people is sufficiently flagrant, this should be done. Criminals should be sterilized and feeble-minded persons forbidden to leave offspring behind them."

When Madison Grant published his book The Passing of the Great Race, Roosevelt wrote this to Scribner's Magazine to promote it:

The book is a capital book; in purpose, in vision, in grasp of the facts our people most need to realize. It shows an extraordinary range of reading and a wide scholarship. It shows a habit of singular serious thought on the subject of most commanding importance. It shows a fine fearlessness in assailing the popular and mischievous sentimentalities and attractive and corroding falsehoods which few men dare assail. It is the work of an American scholar and gentleman; and all Americans should be sincerely grateful to you for writing it.

Roosevelt was greatly impressed by the performance of ethnic American soldiers in the world war. Biographer Kathleen Dalton says:

He insisted to [Madison] Grant that race and ethnicity did not matter because men of foreign parentage across the nation fought well, including Jews....Roosevelt took the final step toward believing in racial equality. At the end of his life TR repudiated the Madison Grants and other racists and promised W.E.B. DuBois to work with more energy for racial justice.

== Historical views ==
Roosevelt's definitive 1882 book The Naval War of 1812 was the standard work on the topic for two generations and is still extensively quoted. Roosevelt undertook extensive and original research, computing British and American man-of-war broadside throw weights. However, Pringle says his biographies Thomas Hart Benton (1887) and Gouverneur Morris (1888) are hastily written and superficial. His four-volume history of the frontier titled The Winning of the West (1889–1896) had some impact on historiography as it presented a highly original version of the frontier thesis elaborated upon by his friend Frederick Jackson Turner in 1893.

Roosevelt argued the frontier conditions created a new race: the American people that replaced the "scattered savage tribes, whose life was but a few degrees less meaningless, squalid, and ferocious than that of the wild beasts with whom they held joint ownership". He believed "the conquest and settlement by the whites of the Indian lands was necessary to the greatness of the race and to the well-being of civilized mankind". His many articles in upscale magazines provided a much-needed income. He was later chosen president of the American Historical Association.

== Direct election of Senators ==
The direct election of senators (which later became the 17th amendment) was an important initiative for progressives of the era, with Roosevelt being among the supporters of the idea. He spoke frequently on the campaign trail about the issue and it is included in the 1912 platform of the Progressive Party.

== Taxation and trade ==
Roosevelt believed that in his day many of the corporate magnates and powerful trust titans amassed their wealth in ill-gotten ways. As such, he viewed the inheritance tax as well as income tax initiatives as an important part of his progressive views. He also believed that "free trade" was pernicious, and aligned with other Republicans in his day on the need for tariffs.

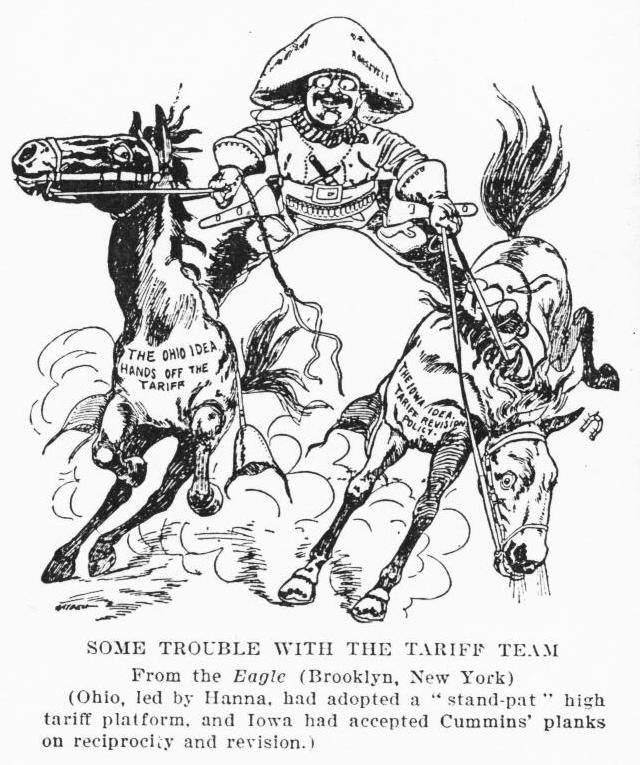
President Roosevelt watches tariffs pull GOP team apart

=== Trade and tariffs ===
Roosevelt favored William McKinley's emphasis on the high protective tariff as conducive to economic prosperity and high wages. However, as president he saw how destructive the issue was while it ripped the Republican party apart, so he generally stayed away from the topic as president.

He was an outspoken opponent of free trade—that is, zero tariffs. He wrote "Thank God I am not a free-trader. In this country pernicious indulgence in the doctrine of free trade seems inevitably to produce fatty degeneration of the moral fibre."

=== Inheritance tax ===
In his well known work The Man with the Muck Rake, he declared:

As a matter of personal conviction, and without pretending to discuss the details or formulate the system, I feel that we shall ultimately have to consider the adoption of some such scheme as that of a progressive tax on all fortunes, beyond a certain amount, either given in life or devised or bequeathed upon death to any individual-a tax so framed as to put it out of the power of the owner of one of these enormous fortunes to hand on more than a certain amount to any one individual; the tax of course, to be imposed by the national and not the state government. Such taxation should, of course, be aimed merely at the inheritance or transmission in their entirety of those fortunes swollen beyond all healthy limits.

=== Income tax ===
Roosevelt supported gradual income taxation on citizens instead of a system of tariffs. In his 1907 State of the Union speech, he said:

A graduated income tax of the proper type would be a desirable feature of Federal taxation, and it is to be hoped that one may be devised which the Supreme Court will declare constitutional. The inheritance tax, however, is both a far better method of taxation, and far more important for the purpose of having the fortunes of the country bear in proportion to their increase in size a corresponding increase and burden of taxation.

He spent years calling for income taxation, including during his run for the presidency in 1912 in his New Nationalism speech.

== Living Wage ==
As a part of Roosevelt's mandate for social justice, he believed in the creation of a Living Wage. The living wage was a part of the platform of the Progressive Party (United States, 1912), as well as a part of Roosevelt's major speech to the Progressive party, in which he said:

We stand for a living wage. Wages are subnormal if they fail to provide a living for those who devote their time and energy to industrial occupations. The monetary equivalent of a living wage varies according to local conditions, but must include enough to secure the elements of a normal standard of living--a standard high enough to make morality possible, to provide for education and recreation, to care for immature members of the family, to maintain the family during periods of sickness, and to permit of reasonable saving for old age.

Roosevelt did, however, speak out against the Adamson Act affecting the wages and other conditions of railway employees; criticizing calls by the brotherhoods for legislation to raise wages "without investigation and without the exercise of that form of judgment shown by a competent commission," as he put it, and argued that President Wilson (who signed the aforementioned legislation into law) had “destroyed the principle of arbitration in the settlement of industrial disputes and put a premium on securing the settlements by threats and duress.”

Nevertheless, Roosevelt continued to believe in living wage legislation. In a keynote speech as part of a 1918 campaign, Roosevelt intended (as noted by one historian) “to make the country reconsider the idea of a national minimum wage, a standard of living below which no American should fall.”

== Social Insurance ==
A strong advocate of social insurance, Roosevelt believed that people should be shielded from the various hazards of life. Roosevelt put forward his views on the subject during a speech he delivered at a convention of the Progressive Party in August 1912, in which he declared that

It is abnormal for any industry to throw back upon the community the human wreckage due to its wear and tear, and the hazzards of sickness, accident, invalidism, involuntary unemployment, and old age should be provided for through insurance. This should be made a charge in whole or in part upon the industries the employer, the employee, and perhaps the people at large, to contribute severally in some degree. Wherever such standards are not met by given establishments, by given industries, are unprovided for by a legislature, or are balked by unenlightened courts, the workers are in jeopardy, the progressive employer is penalized, and the community pays a heavy cost in lessened efficiency and in misery. What Germany has done in the way of old age pensions or insurance should be studied by us, and the system adapted to our uses, with whatever modifications are rendered necessary by our different ways of life and habits of thought.

As far back as his presidency, Roosevelt had been an advocate of social insurance. For instance, he supported the introduction of injury compensation for certain government employees, and in his Eighth State of the Union Address had called for such compensation to be extended to all government employees. In the same address, Roosevelt spoke positively of the adoption of old-age pension programs by many private industries, and expressed his belief that old-age pension coverage could be “indefinitely extended” through savings banks or through contributory and voluntary schemes.

In a 1916 speech, Roosevelt praised Germany for its social security legislation, noting how with Otto Von Bismarck (the progenitor of German’s modern social security programs) it was a prime objective of his

To secure for the wageworkers their legitimate shares of the benefits, not only in wages, but in standard of living and in such ways as sickness insurance, old age pensions and the like. Germany is infinitely ahead of us in all of these matters. Germany gives better care, at less cost, to the workingman, in health and in sickness, by her system of organization under government direction, and of organization by perfected private cooperation, than we do by our unregulated individualism.

Roosevelt continued to advocate social insurance towards the end of his life, including old age pensions and unemployment insurance as two of the measures he put forward in one of his later writings.

== Roosevelt as progressive conservative and later as progressive liberal ==
Several historians emphasize TR's progressivism-as-liberalism. But Roosevelt knew he needed conservative support and repeatedly said his plans reflected conservative values. Thus Daniel Ruddy argues in his book Theodore the Great: Conservative Crusader that Roosevelt was actually a "populist conservative" and a "Hamiltonian"—a conservative in the eighteenth century sense of the word in the sense of calling for a much stronger national government that had a major role in shaping the economy. (Note: "When Roosevelt used the word progressive, it was in the same way that Edmund Burke, the intellectual founder of modern conservatism, used the word reform—as the lifeblood of an active conservatism that could prevent social discontent and revolution. Roosevelt was a conservative crusader who believed in a strong, united America. Progressivism, as he understood it, was the means to achieve that end".) Similarly, Francis Fukuyama identifies Roosevelt, together with Alexander Hamilton, as part of a tradition of a strong-state conservatism in the United States.

In his memoirs, Harry S. Truman described Roosevelt during his presidency as having been "far to the left for a Republican-but still right of center as far as the Democrats were concerned" while acknowledging that Roosevelt "had put into effect a lot of liberal ideas such as conservation of natural resources and the checking of 'malefactors of great wealth.'"

Roosevelt has been the main figure identified with progressive conservatism. Roosevelt stated that he had "always believed that wise progressivism and wise conservatism go hand in hand".

During his presidency, Roosevelt had hoped to take the Republican Party into a more progressive conservative direction. As one historian has noted, when Roosevelt prepared to vacate the presidency in 1908, he reflected on his “business” as a Republican leader having been

To take hold of the conservative party and turn it into what it had been under Lincoln, that is, a party of progressive conservatism, or conservative radicalism; for of course wise radicalism and wise conservatism go hand in hand.

After leaving the presidency, however, Roosevelt came to identify himself with progressive liberalism rather than progressive conservatism. This was highlighted in a letter Roosevelt wrote to an English friend by the name of Sir George Otto Trevelyan, dated October the 21st 1911, where he shared his observations of his overseas travels and experiences of politics in other nations like France:

Of course there are plenty of French republicans, just as there are plenty of English radicals and American progressives, with whom I am as completely out of sympathy as with any ecclesiastic or royalist reactionary. But fundamentally it is the radical liberal in all three countries with whom I sympathize. He is at least working toward the end for which I think we should all of us strive; and when he adds sanity and moderation to courage and enthusiasm for high ideals he develops into the kind of statesman whom alone I can whole-heartedly support.

Roosevelt had already seemingly identified himself with liberalism in early 1909. In an essay published on March the 27th that year, which focused on socialism in the United States, Roosevelt noted cases where common ground could be found between socialists and liberals, arguing

Moreover, we should always remember that Socialism is both a wide and a loose term, and that the self-styled Socialists are of many and utterly different types. If we should study only the professed apostles of radical Socialism, of what these men themselves like to call “scientific Socialism,” or if we should study only what active leaders of Socialism in this country have usually done, or read only the papers in which they have usually expressed themselves, we would gain an utterly wrong impression of very many men who call themselves Socialists. There are many peculiarly high-minded men and women who like to speak of themselves as Socialists, whose attitude, conscious or unconscious, is really merely an indignant recognition of the evil of present conditions and an ardent wish to remedy it, and whose Socialism is really only an advanced form of liberalism.

Roosevelt’s move towards progressive liberalism was also arguably reflected by his foundation of the Progressive Party, which one observer indirectly described as a “distinctly liberal or radical party.”

Roosevelt also hoped that the Republican Party would become what he called a “constructive liberal party,” expressing in a letter he wrote to Will H. Hays (then chairman of the Republican National Committee) in May 1918 that

if the Republican party takes the ground that the world must be the same old world, the Republican party is lost. There can be no doubt but that labor must have a new voice in the management of industrial affairs. The right of labor to collective bargaining, and in that right, the further right to know exactly how the books stand in every industrial concern is going to be a vital political question and the Republican party should take a constructive stand. It cannot afford to talk about constitutional rights of capital and try to dam the moving current of the times. I am satisfied that many Republicans who did not believe these things three and six years ago, are going to believe them now. And I feel that if you will give the Republican organization a free opportunity for development it will develop into a constructive liberal party.

Roosevelt’s shift to the left was commented on by historian Thomas C. Reeves, who argued that (in reference to the period during Taft’s last two years in office)

As Taft had moved to the right during the past two years, Roosevelt had continued to move to the left, along with progressives generally. He had been strongly influenced by Herbert Croly’s important book The Promise of American Life, which had appeared a year earlier. The New Nationalism advocated a highly active federal government and the full agenda of progressive proposals, including such political reforms as the initiative and referendum, direct primaries, the recall of elected officials, and the recall of judicial decisions. Roosevelt was especially critical of the conservative judiciary, arguing that human rights should never be subordinate to property rights, and adding that the community should have the power to regulate property “to whatever degree the public welfare may require.” Taft and his allies were appalled by Roosevelt’s views, just as progressives cheered him.

== Foreign policy ==
In the analysis by Henry Kissinger, Theodore Roosevelt was the first president to develop the guideline that it was America's duty to make its enormous power and potential influence felt globally. The idea of being a passive "city on the hill" model that others could look up to, he rejected. Roosevelt, trained in biology, was a social darwinist who believed in survival of the fittest. The international world in his view was a realm of violence and conflict. The United States had all the economic and geographical potential to be the fittest nation on the globe. The United States had a duty to act decisively. For example, in terms of the Monroe Doctrine, America had to prevent European incursions in the Western Hemisphere. However, there was more, as he expressed in his famous Roosevelt Corollary to the Monroe Doctrine: the U.S. had to be the policeman of the region because unruly, corrupt smaller nations had to be controlled. If the United States did not do so, European powers would, in fact, intervene and develop their own base of power in the hemisphere, contravening the Monroe Doctrine.

In foreign policy Roosevelt was a realist and a conservative. He deplored many of the increasingly popular idealistic liberal themes, such as were promoted by William Jennings Bryan, the anti-imperialists, and Woodrow Wilson. Kissinger says he rejected the efficacy of international law. Roosevelt argued that if a country could not protect its own interests, the international community could not help very much. He ridiculed disarmament proposals that were increasingly common. He saw no likelihood of an international power capable of checking wrongdoing on a major scale. As for world government:

I regard the Wilson–Bryan attitude of trusting to fantastic peace treaties, too impossible promises, to all kinds of scraps of paper without any backing in efficient force, as abhorrent. It is infinitely better for a nation and for the world to have the Frederick the Great and Bismarck tradition as regards foreign policy than to have the Bryan or Bryan–Wilson attitude as a permanent national attitude.... A milk-and-water righteousness unbacked by force is...as wicked as and even more mischievous than force divorced from righteousness.

On the positive side, Roosevelt favored spheres of influence, whereby one great power would generally prevail, such as the United States in the Western Hemisphere or Great Britain in the Indian subcontinent. Japan fit that role and he approved. However he had deep distrust of both Germany and Russia.

=== Imperialism ===
Theodore Roosevelt is consistently regarded as an imperialist by historians. As noted by the U.S. Naval Institute, he "subsequently presided over the globalization of American policy", and he held a much more expansive view of the United States on the global stage, including a continued presence in the Philippines and the Panama Canal project.

== See also ==
- Presidency of Theodore Roosevelt
- Foreign policy of the Theodore Roosevelt administration
- Roosevelt Republican
