= Roosevelt Republican =

Term in United States politics

Roosevelt Republicanism
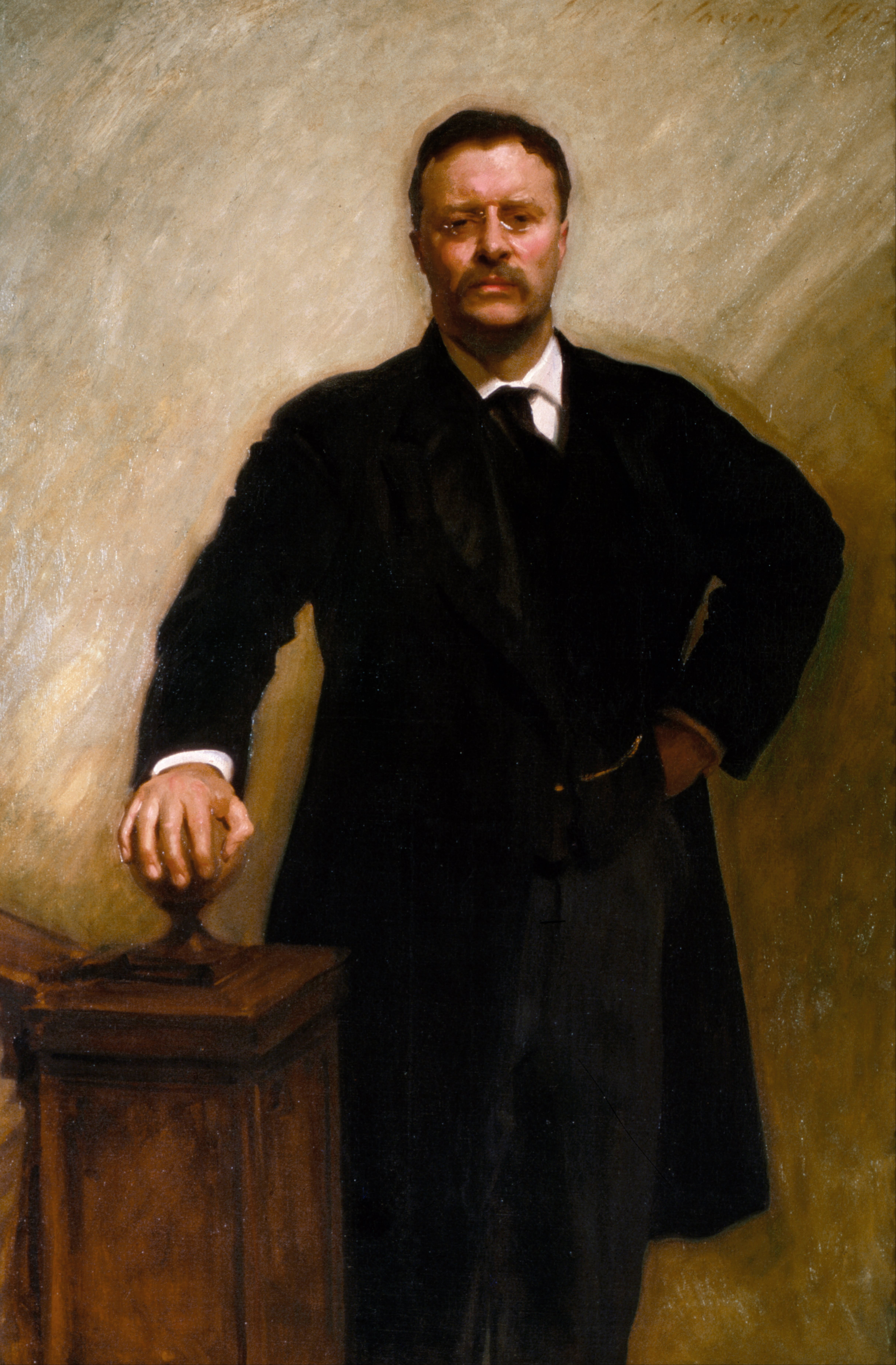
- Theodore Roosevelt (1903), the movement's chief architect and namesake.

Political Overview
- Era: Early 20th century (c. 1901–1912)
- Key Leader: Theodore Roosevelt
- Core Affiliation: Republican Party; Progressive Party
- Political Alignment: Center-left to center

Ideological Foundations
- Primary Ideology: Progressivism
- Key Doctrines: Square Deal; New Nationalism
- Major Policies: Trust-busting; Environmental conservation; Consumer protection

Legacy & Offshoots
- Rockefeller Republicans

Roosevelt Republican is a term used in discussions about politics of the United States to describe individuals with beliefs reminiscent of American President Theodore Roosevelt, a politician who spent much of his career as a Republican. Roosevelt possessed diverse political positions and social views, but this label has been generally deployed by figures who wish to publicly align themselves with Roosevelt's record of nature conservation. In particular, defending historic wildlife and undertaking related efforts to preserve environments seen as a part of classic Americana receives emphasis.

This mindset broadly contrasts with the ideologies of ethnic nationalism and religious nationalism through identity politics coupled with wholesale economic development without protections for nature advocated for by the Republican mainstream of the 2010s and 2020s, though more centrist and center-left thinking significantly influenced the party in prior decades.

== Viewpoints ==
In terms of specific policies, being a "Roosevelt Republican" has been described as supporting the conservation movement and having sympathies for environmentalist measures aimed at protecting natural landscapes. This frequently entails an emphasis on hunting and fishing along with wildlife tourism under the backdrop of government ownership of certain areas, with a particularly limited room for more invasive uses of public areas such as mining. Administrative efforts in cleaning up locations after coal extraction and other intensive uses of various lands to restore previous appearances have importance as well. This all contrasts with the Republican Party's traditional focus on privatization to encourage corporate ownership of former public locations as well as related policies aiming to radically convert more areas from a natural status to one of industrial economic development.

== Politicians associated with the label ==
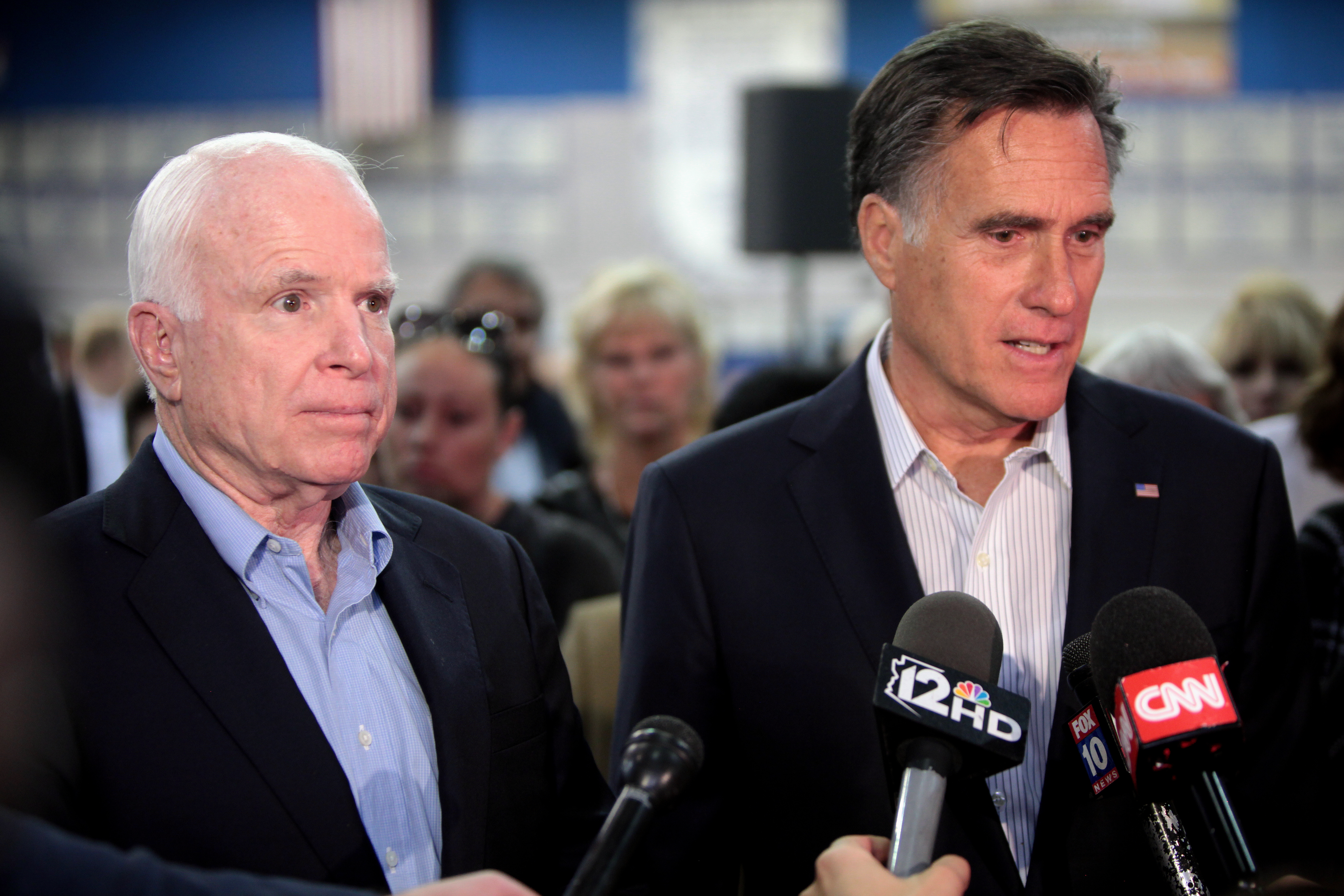
Politicians John McCain of Arizona (left) and Mitt Romney of Massachusetts (right), both pictured speaking in Mesa, Arizona during late 2016 campaigning, have taken moderate stances such as backing environmentalist measures, such American bipartisanship contrasting with other Republicans.

Statesmen who have self-identified as such include political figure John McCain of Arizona, who possessed diverse social positions and thoughts on differing issues but championed Roosevelt's ideas for decades and viewed the president as a personal hero. An article published by The Washington Post in June 2001 described both individuals as having "a larger-than-life personality and a war hero" background while additionally labeling McCain a "[m]averick" alienated from Republican Party orthodoxy. McCain notably served in the U.S. Senate for many years as an 'institutionalist' aiming to preserve social traditions of bipartisan activity in America. His beliefs contrasted more and more as time went on with the identity politics and ideological closeness based on cultural categories such as ethnicity and race that has defined the Republican mainstream under right-wing figures such as Donald Trump, with McCain's legacy becoming largely repudiated by his party upon his death.

Former U.S. Congressman and present Governor of Florida, Ron DeSantis, has referred to himself as a "Teddy Roosevelt conservationist". This labeling has attracted public criticism from news agencies such as the Orlando Weekly as well as from non-profit organizations focusing on conservation such as the League of Conservation Voters (LCV). His voting record as a member of the House of Representatives indicates very little support for policies supported by environmentalists, earning him a ranking of 2% (out of a possible 100%) by the LCV. DeSantis has denied the scientific realities around climate change, asserting that the sea level rise may or may not be "because of human activity".

Another self-described "Roosevelt Republican" is Ryan Zinke, a Montana politician and U.S. Navy veteran who became the 52nd U.S. Secretary of Interior on March 1, 2017. However, during his tenure as Secretary of the Interior, Zinke oversaw an aggressive expansion of industrial activity on public lands, including fast-tracking environmental reviews for oil and gas drilling to increase the number of permits, proposing offshore oil drilling on both the east and west coasts (an act that was opposed by governors of all 15 coastal states), and the nation's first-ever reductions in the boundaries of national monuments to favor utilization of the land by private companies involved in the oil and gas industry.

== See also ==
- Bipartisanship in United States politics
- Centrism in the United States
- Conservation movement
- Politics of the United States
  - Positions of Theodore Roosevelt
  - Square Deal
- Presidency of Theodore Roosevelt
  - Bull Moose Party
  - U.S. Republican Party
- Rockefeller Republican
