= New Nationalism =

New Nationalism may refer to:

- New Nationalism (Theodore Roosevelt), a Progressive political philosophy during the 1912 U.S. presidential election
- New Nationalism (21st century), a type of nationalism that rose in the mid-2010s especially in Western Europe and the United States
- The Conservative Revolution in Germany, also known as new nationalism.
