= Walter Weyl =

American political writer (1873–1919)

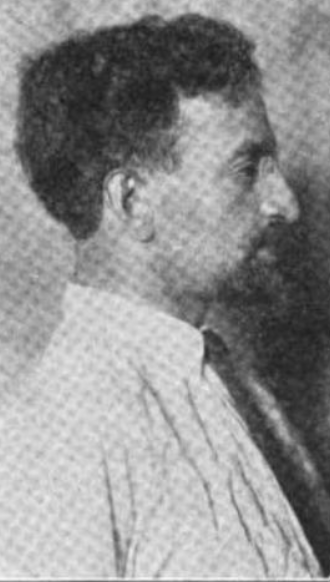
- Walter Weyl, from a 1912 publication
- Born: March 11, 1873; Philadelphia, Pennsylvania, US
- Died: November 9, 1919 (aged 46); Woodstock, New York, US
- Education: Wharton School at University of Pennsylvania
- Occupations: economist, journalist
- Years active: 1901–1919
- Organization: The New Republic
- Notable work: The New Democracy (1912)
- Movement: Progressive movement
- Spouse: Bertha Poole Weyl
- Children: Nathaniel Weyl
- Relatives: Julius Stern

Walter Edward Weyl (March 11, 1873 – November 9, 1919) was a writer and speaker, an intellectual leader of the Progressive movement in the United States. As a strong nationalist, his goal was to remedy the relatively weak American national institutions with a strong state. Weyl wrote widely on issues of economics, labor, public policy, and international affairs in numerous books, articles, and editorials; he was a coeditor of the highly influential The New Republic magazine, 1914–1916. His most influential book, The New Democracy (1912) was a classic statement of democratic meliorism, revealing his path to a future of progress and modernization based on middle class values, aspirations and brain work. It articulated the general mood:

"America to-day is in a somber, soul-questioning mood. We are in a period of clamor, of bewilderment, of an almost tremulous unrest. We are hastily revising all our social conceptions.... We are profoundly disenchanted with the fruits of a century of independence."

== Early life ==
His father, Nathan Weyl, had emigrated from the German Palatinate, but his death, when Walter was seven, left the boy in the care of five brothers and sisters at the home of his maternal grandmother, the widow of Philadelphia merchant Julius Stern.

Weyl started young (at 13) at Philadelphia Central High School and received a scholarship to the Wharton School of the University of Pennsylvania, entering as a junior and graduating (with distinction) two years later (at 19) after studies under economist Simon Patten. He studied law briefly and then went abroad for graduate work in economics at the universities of Halle, Paris, and Berlin. In 1896, he returned to Wharton to complete a doctorate; his dissertation was published a year later, as The Passenger Traffic of Railways.

In 1899, he left academia and drifted for several years. He worked at a settlement house in New York. He searched for mineral deposits in Mexico. He performed statistical surveys for the Bureau of Labor and the United States Department of the Treasury. He helped John Mitchell, leader of the United Mine Workers, write Organized Labor: Its Problems, Purposes, and Ideals (1903).

=== Journalist and economist ===
Weyl started writing about the lives of new immigrants in popular magazine articles. Over time, he wrote increasingly about national resources and social policy. His book, The New Democracy (1912), came to serve as a statement for the US Progressive Movement and its economic reforms.

In 1914, Weyl joined Herbert Croly and Walter Lippmann as a founding editors of The New Republic magazine, where he worked from 1914 to 1916.

== World War I ==
In 1915, during World War I, he traveled in Germany and Russia, publishing his observations in American World Policies (1917) and The End of the War (1918).

American World Policies (1917), published before the outcome of the war was known, examined the profound changes that it caused in the American psyche:

"The Great War has thrown America back upon itself. It has come as a test and challenge to all our theories. Suddenly, yet subtly, it has shaken our optimism and undermined our faith in the peaceful progress of humanity. Our isolation is gone, and with it our sense of security and self-direction. Americans, who a few days ago would have dared to abolish army and navy as a supreme earnest of good faith, reluctantly agree to arm. 'Self-defence,' they now say, 'comes before progress. We must lay aside our hopes of a world at peace and must guard our gates.'"

In 1917, Weyl traveled to China, Japan, and Korea.

During the war, Weyl helped organize the quartermaster general's office in the War Department.

Weyl had hoped but failed to be part of the U.S. delegation to the Paris Peace Conference, but he traveled to Europe anyway in the winter and the spring of 1919 to bear witness to the postwar gathering. He knew many of members of the Commission and spent a great deal of time composing numerous books in his head that might explain the complexities and tragedy of the conference. He was especially concerned with the growing restiveness of the "proletariat" and wondered if the conference was not marking "the suicide of capitalism."

== Personal ==
In 1907 Weyl married Bertha Poole, a labor organizer, writer, and fellow settlement house worker who came from a wealthy Chicago family. They lived mostly in Woodstock, NY. Their only son was Nathaniel Weyl.

== Death ==
Weyl died of throat cancer on November 9, 1919, at the age of forty-six.

== Influence ==
Arthur M. Schlesinger Jr. included Weyl among important American political thinkers, among whom were Thorstein Veblen, John Dewey, Louis Brandeis; Herbert Croly, Walter Lippmann, and Charles A. Beard; and Rexford Tugwell, Adolf Berle, William T. Foster, Paul Douglas, Frances Perkins, Harry Hopkins, and Felix Frankfurter.

The New Democracy celebrated the democratic impulse in the Progressive movement, theorizing that a "social surplus" (comfortable material prosperity) gave America the opportunity to achieve greater social justice. He decried the excessive individualism of the age, calling for more effective collective action led by experts and the state and national governments. He thought the US Constitution was too confining and that the selfishness of the rich was an obstacle to future reform. He believed that progress called for more direct democracy, more regulation of trusts big business by the federal government greater efficiency in business and in the public sector and an increased role for organized labor unions. He ridiculed the privileged and powerful but rejected socialism.

== Writings ==
=== Books ===
- The Passenger Traffic of Railways (1901)
- Current Labor Problems (1903) online
- The New Democracy: An Essay on Certain Political and Economic Tendencies in the United States (1912) read online
- American World Policies (1917) read online
- The End of the War (1918, 1918) read online
- Tired Radicals, and Other Papers (1921) read online

=== Co-authored books ===
- Equitable Taxation. Six essays in answer to the question, What, if any, changes in existing plans are necessary to secure an equitable distribution of the burden of taxation for the support of national, state, and municipal governments? with Robert Luce, Bolton Hall, J. Whidden Graham, John Winslow Cabot, W. H. Cowles, with an introduction by the Hon. Jonathan A. Lane. (1892)
- Organized Labor: Its Problems, Purposes, and Ideals—with UMW leader John Mitchell (1903)

=== Articles ===
In 1912 Weyl interpreted the Lawrence Strike for the Committee on Industrial Relations, an effort which received public notice.

- "The Democratization of Party Finances," American Political Science Review, Vol. 7, No. 1, Supplement: Proceedings of the American Political Science Association at Its Ninth Annual Meeting (February 1913), pp. 178–182 in JSTOR

=== Papers ===
- "Weyl, Walter E. (Walter Edward), 1873-1919: Papers, 1862-1956 (bulk 1911-1919)". Rutgers University.
