= Herbert Croly =

American Progressive political writer and editor (1869–1930)

Herbert David Croly
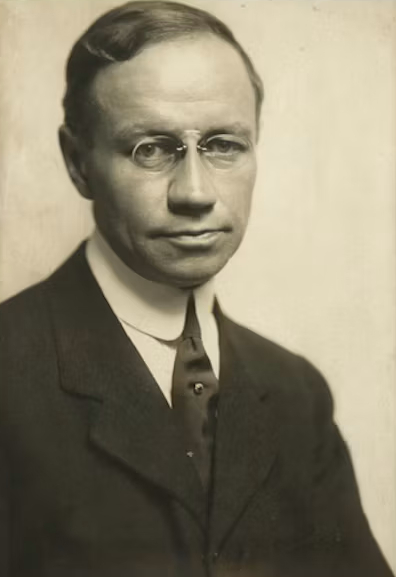
- Born: January 23, 1869; Manhattan, New York City, U.S.
- Died: May 17, 1930 (aged 61); Santa Barbara, California, U.S.
- Education: City College of New York; Harvard University
- Occupations: Journalist, Magazine Editor, Author,
- Known for: Political philosophy, intellectual leadership of the Progressive Movement
- Political party: Republican
- Spouse: Louise Emory
- Father: David G. Croly

Herbert David Croly (January 23, 1869 – May 17, 1930) was an intellectual leader of the progressive movement as an editor, political philosopher and a co-founder of the magazine The New Republic in early twentieth-century America. His political philosophy influenced many leading progressives including Theodore Roosevelt, Adolph Berle, as well as his close friends Judge Learned Hand and Supreme Court Justice Felix Frankfurter.

His 1909 book The Promise of American Life looked to the constitutional liberalism as espoused by Alexander Hamilton, combined with the radical democracy of Thomas Jefferson. The book influenced contemporaneous progressive thought, shaping the ideas of many intellectuals and political leaders, including then ex-President Theodore Roosevelt. Calling themselves "The New Nationalists", Croly and Walter Weyl sought to remedy the relatively weak national institutions with a strong federal government. He promoted a strong army and navy and attacked pacifists who thought democracy at home and peace abroad was best served by keeping America weak.

Croly was one of the founders of modern liberalism in the United States, especially through his books, essays and a highly influential magazine founded in 1914, The New Republic. In his 1914 book Progressive Democracy, Croly rejected the thesis that the American liberal tradition was inhospitable to anti-capitalist alternatives. He drew from the American past a history of resistance to capitalist wage relations that was fundamentally liberal, and he reclaimed an idea that progressives had allowed to lapse—that working for wages was a lesser form of liberty. Increasingly skeptical of the capacity of social welfare legislation to remedy social ills, Croly argued that America's liberal promise could be redeemed only by syndicalist reforms involving workplace democracy. Though many have said his love of trusts and monopoly were directly contradictory to liberal syndicalism. His liberal goals were part of his commitment to American republicanism.

== Family ==
Herbert Croly was born in Manhattan, New York City in 1869 to journalists Jane Cunningham Croly—better known by her pseudonym "Jenny June"—and David Goodman Croly.

Jane Croly was a contributor to The New York Times, The Messenger, and the New York World. She was the editor of Demorest's Illustrated Monthly for 27 years. Jane Croly wrote only on the subject of women and published nine books in addition to her work as a journalist. She was one of the best-known women in America when Herbert Croly was born.

David Croly worked as a reporter for the Evening Post and The New York Herald, as well as the editor of the New York World for 12 years. He was also a noted pamphleteer during Abraham Lincoln's presidency.

Herbert Croly married Louise Emory on May 30, 1892. They remained married until Herbert Croly's death in 1930. They had no children.

== Education ==
Croly attended the City College of New York for one year and entered Harvard College in 1886.

David Croly soon became concerned that his son was being exposed to improper philosophical material at Harvard. The father was a follower of Auguste Comte and discouraged Herbert from studying theology and philosophers that did not agree with Comte. During Herbert’s first two years at Harvard, David became gravely ill, and in 1888 Herbert dropped out of Harvard to become his father’s private secretary and companion. His father died on April 29, 1889.

After Herbert married Louise Emory in 1892 he re-enrolled in Harvard. But, in 1893, Herbert suffered a nervous breakdown and withdrew again from Harvard. Herbert and Louise moved to Cornish, New Hampshire, where he recovered. In 1895, Herbert enrolled for the final time at Harvard at the age of 26. He excelled in his studies until 1899, when he withdrew for the last time from Harvard for unknown reasons, without a degree.

In 1910, after the publication of Herbert Croly's book The Promise of American Life, he was awarded an honorary degree by Harvard University.

== Early career ==
Little is known about Croly's immediate actions after he left Harvard in 1899. Historians believe he went to Paris intending to study philosophy, but by 1900 he had returned to New York City. After returning to America, Herbert Croly worked as an editor for an architectural magazine, The Architectural Record, from 1900 to 1906.

=== Cornish Art Colony ===
After Croly had first come to Cornish, a thriving art colony, he decided to build a house there, designed by Charles A. Platt, a prominent architect and friend of Croly through Croly's magazine (Architectural Record). It was typical of Platt's early style, done in an Italianate style with formal gardens and a sweeping view of Mt. Ascutney, a famous feature of many colony homes.

It was in Cornish that Croly worked on a new project: The Promise of American Life, a political book he hoped would provide guidance for Americans during the transition from an agrarian to an industrialized society. When it published in 1909, Croly became a leading political thinker and prominent figure in the progressive movement.

In addition to Platt, Croly was good friends with judge Learned Hand, whose family vacationed in Cornish at their estate "Low Court", and Louis Shipman, a Harvard classmate and playwright who accompanied Croly on his first visit to the colony. Shipman and his wife Ellen had a home in the neighboring town of Plainfield. It is near there that Croly and the Shipmans are buried, in the Gilkey Cemetery just north of the village.

== The Promise of American Life ==
In The Promise of American Life, Herbert Croly set out his argument for a progressive-liberal government in twentieth-century America. He saw democracy as the defining American trait and described democracy not as a government devoted to equal rights but as one with the aim of “bestowing a share of the responsibility and the benefits, derived from political economic association, upon the whole community.” He returned to Thomas Jefferson and Alexander Hamilton as representatives of the two main schools of American political thought. Croly famously admitted, “I shall not disguise the fact that on the whole my own preferences are on the side of Hamilton rather than of Jefferson.”

Despite his preference for Hamilton, Croly believed there were some good aspects about Jefferson’s philosophy on government. He wrote, "Jefferson was filled with a sincere, indiscriminate, and unlimited faith in the American people." However, Croly viewed Jeffersonian democracy as "tantamount to extreme individualism", suitable only for pre-Civil War America when the ideal Americans were pioneers pursuing individual wealth. Croly's largest contribution to American political thought was to synthesize the two thinkers into one theory on government: Jefferson’s strong democracy achieved through Hamilton’s strong national government.

=== Economy ===
Croly argued that when America shifted from an agrarian economy to an industrial one, Jefferson’s vision was no longer realistic for America. Instead, Croly turned to Alexander Hamilton’s theory of big national government. Government, according to Croly, could no longer be content with protecting negative rights; it needed to actively promote the welfare of its citizens. Croly proposed a three-pronged program: the nationalization of large corporations, the strengthening of labor unions, and a strong central government.

Croly firmly believed that labor unions were “the most effective machinery which has yet been forged for the economic and social amelioration of the laboring class.” He wanted unions to have the right to negotiate contracts to ensure companies would only hire union workers. Unlike other progressives, Croly did not want the government to wage war against large corporations. He wanted the Sherman Antitrust Act repealed and replaced with a national incorporation act that would regulate and, if necessary, nationalize corporations. Croly had little sympathy for non-union workers and small businesses, declaring that “Whenever the small competitor of the large corporation is unable to keep his head above water, he should be allowed to drown.”

Croly did not support economic equality or large disparities in wealth. He believed it was the responsibility of a powerful central government to practice “constructive discrimination” on behalf of the poor. Croly's plan included a federal inheritance rate of 20%, not the individual income tax that other progressive reformers wanted. Croly argued that compensation for work should be adjusted to “the needs of a normal and wholesome life”—an idea along the lines of the Utopian author Edward Bellamy.

=== Rights ===
Croly called for the adoption of Hamiltonian means to achieve Jeffersonian ends. To achieve this synthesis, however, Croly rejected Hamilton's arguments for institutional checks on a pure national democracy, and Jefferson's arguments for limited government. Croly rejected these limits because he saw them as too closely tied to the doctrine of individual rights. Croly wanted to transcend the doctrine of individual rights in order to create a national political community, one that would be forged by a strong but democratic national government. However, Croly failed to see the connection between Jefferson's belief in democracy and his belief in limited government, and he failed to see the connection between Hamilton's belief in a strong national government and his call for institutional checks on democracy. Thus, although many American reform movements have their roots in the rhetoric of Croly's progressivism, to be effective they have had to accommodate the principles of liberal individualism that Croly wished to eradicate.

=== Croly's elite ===
Croly's strong central government needed strong individuals to lead it. His ideal was Abraham Lincoln, a person who was “something of a saint and something of a hero” and understood that democracy in America was greater than "rights"; it was a national ideal. Croly, like Hamilton, had a faith in the powerful few and sincerely believed that those few would remain democratic. His search for a great American leader became an obsession that was never satisfied. Croly's notion of the elite was challenged by civil libertarians who believed Croly's powerful few would lead to a totalitarian state. In the telling of Fred Siegel of the conservative Manhattan Institute, “For Croly, businessmen and their allies – the jack-of-all-trades latter-day Jeffersonians – were blocking the path to the bright future he envisioned for the specialists of the rising professional classes.”

=== Criticism ===
The Promise of American Life has received criticism from a number of angles. Many feared the underlying tones of totalitarianism or fascism. Croly insisted his government was nationalistic not socialistic. Even those who believed Croly's government could be democratic had concerns that Croly's vision for the country was clouded by a Republican prejudice: his writing contained several criticisms of the Democrats but almost none of the Republicans.

Croly's book was also criticized for its lack of national focus. It focused almost entirely on problems that were of interest to those living in cities but not to rural America. The tariff, conservation, currency, banking, and agriculture all were only mentioned in passing, if at all. Connected to that was an argument that Croly's plans were unrealistic and detached from the reality that many Americans were living.

By Croly's death in 1930, 7,500 copies of The Promise of American Life had been sold.

== After The Promise of American Life ==
The publication of The Promise of American Life in 1909 earned Croly a lot of publicity and the attention of some important people, including Dan Hanna, Mark Hanna’s son. From 1911 to 1912, Croly worked on a biography of Hanna: Marcus Alonzo Hanna: His Life and Work. Croly needed a source of income at the time, and Dan Hanna paid Croly to write the book but reserved the right to make changes before it was published. The book had soaring praise for Mark Hanna, a conservative who saw the role of government subsidy to monopoly the same way had.

The Promise of American Life also attracted the attention of Roosevelt; they became friends. When Roosevelt ran for president in 1912 as a candidate for the Bull Moose Party, he used the slogan "New Nationalism". There is some dispute among historians whether Roosevelt took the slogan directly from The Promise of American Life or if he had already developed the concept himself. Either way, Croly was credited at the time as the author.

Croly was drawn into presidential politics during the election of 1912. Croly (representing Roosevelt) took the national stage against Louis Brandeis (representing Woodrow Wilson) on the issue of trusts. Brandeis and Wilson took the side of small business, arguing that competition and equal opportunity for small businesses was at the heart of American democracy. They painted Roosevelt as the candidate of big business, and Croly was charged with arguing that big business, when properly regulated, was better for national unity and prosperity because it was efficient without the greed he associated with small business competition.

Wilson easily defeated Roosevelt and won the election. In early 1913, Croly and his wife moved to Washington, D.C. where Croly started on his next project, the book, Progressive Democracy.

== Progressive Democracy ==
In Progressive Democracy, published in 1915, Croly picked up where The Promise of American Life left off, shifting his focus to economic democracy and the issue of power for workers in large corporations. He wrote that his goal was to explain "the needs and requirements of a genuinely popular system of representative government." For Croly, those needs and requirements included information on major political issues available to the public, energetic public debate and discussion, and the pursuit of a common voice in society.

A main concern of Croly's in Progressive Democracy was that the United States Constitution was fundamentally inconsistent with American democratic aspirations. He perceived the Constitution as a “living Constitution,” capable in his mind of becoming something other than the Founding Fathers intended. Croly's alternative to interpreting the Constitution as "living" was to eliminate it and start over, or at least substantially alter it. The basis for his argument was the belief that for progressive democracy to be successful it needed to move quickly, and the Constitution did not accommodate that. Reforms were needed that could not wait for the approval of Congress or state legislatures.

In Progressive Democracy, Croly expressed hope that reformers in 1915 were different enough from reformers of the past that they could make real differences in American politics. His call for a more progressive democracy hinged on reforming social and economic systems. He accused Woodrow Wilson's administration of returning the country to Jeffersonian individualism, the opposite of where he thought the country should be going. He ended by appealing to Americans’ cultural and social instincts to improve their situation. Rejecting both individualism and socialism, he argued that "the 'scientific' forms of both individualism and socialism rest finally on a dogmatic economic determinism, which presumes to define the laws of social causation, and whose ideal necessarily counts in the submission of the individual and social will to the conditions of the social process. The progressive democratic faith carries with it the liberation of democracy from this class of social pseudo knowledge."

== The New Republic ==
After Woodrow Wilson won the presidential election in 1912, Harper’s Weekly became the leading magazine for Progressive party politics. Herbert Croly believed the magazine took the wrong stance on many issues and endeavored to start a magazine of his own. In 1914, Willard Straight and his wife Dorothy Payne Whitney provided the financing for Croly's magazine, The New Republic.

Croly, Walter Lippmann, and Walter Weyl were the co-founders of The New Republic. The first issue appeared on November 7, 1914. TNR’s articles represented the politics of its founders, and by 1915 the journal had attracted an audience of about 15,000, mainly young intellectuals in New York.

Theodore Roosevelt was the star of many early pieces in TNR, but by December 1914, Roosevelt had a falling out with Croly, Lippmann, and Weyl. The editors chastised Roosevelt for an attack on Wilson’s policy in Mexico. In retaliation, Roosevelt accused the editors of personal disloyalty and ended relations with them, becoming openly hostile toward Croly and the others.

World War I presented the first real policy challenge. Though they had been criticizing various Wilsonian strategies in domestic politics, the editors were hesitant to take a strong position on the war. Croly's pragmatism set the magazine’s tone early, not blaming Germany but not openly supporting the Allies either. In the summer of 1915, TNR endorsed Norman Angell’s notion of a limited war, using techniques like seizing German assets rather than all-out war.

By late 1916, Croly had come around to some of Wilson’s policies and used TNR to declare his support of Wilson in the 1916 election. However, Croly became disillusioned toward the end of World War I and finally abandoned his loyalty to Wilson in 1918.

The period from 1918 to 1921 was difficult for TNR, and by 1921, Croly was the only original member of The New Republic that remained. Willard Straight died of influenza and pneumonia in 1918 at the age of 38, and three weeks later Randolph Bourne, a contributor to TNR from the beginning, died of the same influenza epidemic at age 32. Theodore Roosevelt died at the age of 60 only one month later, followed by Walter Weyl who died in 1919 at age 46. Walter Lippmann left the magazine in 1921 on bad terms with Croly. Around the same time, Judge Learned Hand—one of Croly's closest friends—broke off their friendship over differences between them on the Treaty of Versailles. Although the friendship somewhat healed years later, it was a devastating loss to Croly.

In 1924 The New Republic filed for bankruptcy. Though it reorganized and began publishing again, the original spirit of the magazine would not return. Croly remained a contributor, however, until his death in 1930.

== Later life and death ==
Although Croly eventually joined calls for American involvement in World War I, he became pessimistic and frustrated by the costs of war. In late 1917 and 1918, Croly began questioning his own beliefs about nationalism and democracy. The Treaty of Versailles delivered a severe blow to Croly's progressive spirit, leading him to declare that the Paris Peace Conference was the apocalypse of liberalism.

The vicious treatment of unions during the labor movements in the 1920s was difficult for Croly, a staunch union supporter. The issue of prohibition put Croly's beliefs about the role of the national government to the test. He ultimately adopted the policy Louis Brandeis suggested to him—that the federal government be responsible for interstate trafficking of alcohol but that states take responsibility for internal enforcement. But for Croly, the challenge of how to handle prohibition was the final straw in breaking his faith in his old vision of democracy.

In 1920, Croly worked on another book called The Breach in Civilization. It was a reflection on the role of religion in the future, and a compilation of the ideals Croly once held but by then believed were unrealistic. He wrote that legislation as a solution for social issues was unimportant, and abandoned his own core philosophy that central government could ameliorate the human condition. He condemned progressivism as a failure. As the book was on its way to the publisher, Felix Frankfurter persuaded Croly to withdraw the manuscript. It was never published, and only part of the text remains.

Croly's steady mental and physical decline in the 1920s culminated in a massive stroke in 1928. Though he survived, movement of the right side of his body was impaired and his ability to speak was seriously affected. For 20 painful months Croly and his wife worked toward his recovery, but it was too much to overcome. Herbert Croly died on May 17, 1930, and was buried in Plainfield, New Hampshire, alongside his wife's gravestone.

== New Deal ==
Croly died before the election of Franklin D. Roosevelt and his New Deal. However, historians commonly consider the New Deal to be a program that embodied many of Croly's most central beliefs and ideas. Whether or not Roosevelt was directly influenced by Croly's writings is debated, but many of Croly's visions for how government should operate are tenets of the New Deal. Adolph Berle, a member of the New Deal Brain Trust, was a Bull Moose Progressive and familiar with Croly's work.

== Works ==
- Croly, Herbert. The Promise of American Life (1909) full text online
- Croly, Herbert. Progressive Democracy (1914) full text online
- Croly, Herbert. Marcus Alonso Hanna: His Life and Work full text online(1912), favorable biography of the leading conservative politician
- Croly, Herbert. "The Effect on American Institutions of a Powerful Military and Naval Establishment," Annals of the American Academy of Political and Social Science, Vol. 66 (July 1916), pp. 157–172. JSTOR 1013440.
- Croly, Herbert. "State Political Reorganization," Proceedings of the American Political Science Association, Vol. 8, Eighth Annual Meeting (1911), pp. 122–135. JSTOR 3038400.
- Croly, Herbert David, 1869–1930. Religion in life: typescript, 19--. MS Am 1291. Houghton Library, Harvard University.
