= Rockefeller Republican =

Political ideology within the US Republican Party

Rockefeller Republicans
- Leader: Nelson Rockefeller
- Prominent figures: Edward Brooke; Jacob Javits; Charles H. Percy; William Scranton; Ted Stevens; Lowell Weicker; Dwight D. Eisenhower; Richard Nixon
- Founded: 1952
- Dissolved: 1980
- Ideology: Market intervention American Whig tradition Moderate liberalism Keynesianism One-nation conservatism Anti-communism
- Political position: Center to center-right

Rockefeller Republicans were a minority faction of the Republican Party of the United States during the mid–20th century, especially the 1960s, led by Nelson Rockefeller, the governor of New York from 1959 to 1973 and vice president of the United States from 1974 to 1977. Rockefeller Republicans are generally associated with politically moderate or liberal views on social issues, were particularly identified with Rockefeller's support for the civil rights movement, abortion rights, and lavish public works spending, and opposed the growing influence of the fusionist wing within the party, led by Barry Goldwater and later, by Ronald Reagan. As leader of the faction, Rockefeller was an unsuccessful candidate for the Republican presidential nomination in 1960, 1964, and 1968. In 1964, he lost the nomination to Goldwater, and in 1968, he and Reagan were both defeated by the moderate conservative candidate, Richard Nixon.

Michael Lind has identified Rockefeller Republicans with the British tradition of Disraelian one-nation conservatism, arguing that the ascendancy of Goldwater and Reagan prevented the establishment of modern one-nation conservatism in the United States. Lind and Luke Phillips have also tied the Rockefeller Republicans to the historical Whig Party tradition in American politics. Geoffrey Kabaservice has argued that the Rockefeller wing had a distinct ideology which aligned on certain issues with liberals, on others with conservatives, and on many with neither.

Rockefeller Republicanism has also been identified with the declining power of the "eastern establishment" of the party, previously identified with New York governor Thomas E. Dewey and the financial services sector. Before the 1964 California Republican primary, Rockefeller opponent Stuart Spencer called on Rockefeller to "summon that fabled nexus of money, influence, and condescension known as the Eastern Establishment." Rockefeller replied, "You are looking at it, buddy; I am all that is left". Rockefeller Republicans were most common in the northeastern and midwestern states and rarer in the southern and western states.

After Rockefeller's retirement from politics and death in 1979, the faction has declined and largely ceased to exist at the national level. The last candidate for president widely identified as a Rockefeller Republican was John B. Anderson, who ran as an independent against Reagan in 1980. In the 21st century, the "Rockefeller Republican" label has primarily been used as an epithet by modern American conservatives against Republicans they consider too liberal for the party. Despite their national decline, moderate Republicans continued to win state and local elections into the 2020s, including governors Charlie Baker of Massachusetts, Phil Scott of Vermont, and Larry Hogan of Maryland.

== Background ==
Throughout United States history, but particularly since the adoption of the two-party system, political parties have generally functioned as coalitions of special interest groups rather than ideological vehicles. The Republican Party was founded in 1854 as a coalition between moderate abolitionists previously associated with the Free Soil Party and Northern capitalists who had been associated with the Whig Party. The Rockefeller Republican lineage can be traced back to this Whig tradition, which advocated the American System, an economic program calling for the construction of national infrastructure and a national bank, which required more active and reformist government and a purposive interpretation of the U.S. constitution to meet national policy goals. After the American Civil War, the Republican Party was the dominant party in the United States for most of the 19th and early 20th centuries.

The Great Depression, a period of economic decline and poor growth beginning with the Wall Street crash of 1929, upended the party coalitions, leading to the election of Democratic Party president Franklin D. Roosevelt in 1932 and political success for his New Deal coalition. During World War II, Roosevelt maintained high popularity and the Democratic Party solidified its role as the dominant party. Among Republicans, opinion was split between those who sought to repeal Roosevelt's New Deal policies, led by U.S. senator Robert A. Taft of Ohio, and those who advocated reconciliation and acceptance of the New Deal, led by New York governor Thomas E. Dewey. In 1952, Dewey succeeded in securing the presidency for Dwight D. Eisenhower, establishing moderate Republicans.

During the 1950s and 1960s, fusionism developed within the Republican Party, combining traditionalist conservative views with libertarianism.

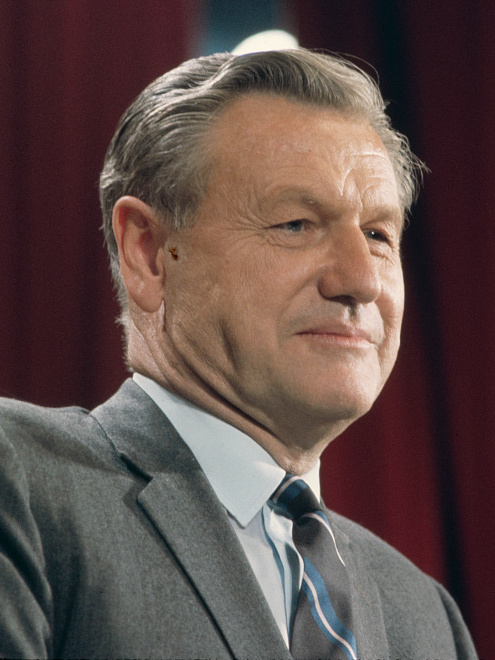
New York governor Nelson Rockefeller, for whom the faction is named

== History ==
Nelson Rockefeller was the governor of New York from 1959 to 1973 and a candidate for president of the United States in 1960, 1964, and 1968. During the 1960s, the term "Rockefeller Republican" came to describe Republicans who shared Rockefeller's support for the civil rights movement, abortion rights and contraception (particularly as a response to supposed overpopulation), economic stimulus, and anti-communism. Notably, several figures later identified as Rockefeller Republicans were not personally supportive of Rockefeller or his political ambitions, and Rockefeller himself alienated many liberal or progressive Republicans later in his career through his support for the war on drugs, especially his management of the 1971 Attica Prison riot and support for the unprecedented 1973 New York drug laws.

=== Rockefeller presidential campaigns (1960–68) ===
In 1960, he was persuaded to end his campaign and endorse Richard Nixon by securing a series of political concessions from Nixon in the party platform. The revised Republican platform called for increased defense spending, expanded nuclear weapon capacity, the establishment of a flexible response force, government stimulus for economic growth, abolition of "the last vestiges of segregation or discrimination," and expanded federal public school funding.

In 1964, Rockefeller ran the strongest of his three campaigns for the Republican nomination. However, his public image was hurt by his 1962 divorce from Mary Todhunter Clark and 1963 remarriage to his political aide, Margaretta Large Fitler, as well as the growing support and organizational power of the fusionists, who successfully secured the nomination for Arizona senator Barry Goldwater, an avowed fusionist and opponent of key civil rights legislation.

Nixon won the 1968 election, foreclosing any further presidential campaigns for the aging Rockefeller, and the faction began to decline in influence.

=== Decline (1968–88) ===
Although Rockefeller was appointed vice president by Gerald Ford in 1973, Ford was heavily criticized by the Goldwater wing of the party for his appointment and faced a primary challenge from California governor Ronald Reagan. Reagan supported Goldwater in 1964, ran on a platform echoing Goldwater's, and rapidly became the party's dominant figurehead after Ford's loss in the general election. By Rockefeller's death in 1979 and Reagan's victory in the 1980 election, Rockefeller Republicans were a shrinking minority and increasingly regional faction within the party, and the label had fallen out of usage. Although George H. W. Bush, who had previously been identified with the Rockefeller wing through his father, Prescott Bush, was nominated for president in 1988, he embraced fusionism in his convention speech, memorably punctuating a pledge to veto any new tax with the phrase, "Read my lips: no new taxes!"

==== Demographic characteristics ====
Rockefeller Republicans have generally been identified with WASPs and mainline Protestantism more generally, two groups which experienced severe demographic decline in the United States during the 20th century. However, there have been exceptions to this general rule: New York senator Jacob Javits was Jewish, and the label has more recently been applied to many liberal Catholic Republicans from northeastern states. Among Republicans, Rockefeller Republicans tended to win greater support from Jewish voters than their conservative and fusionist opponents.

==== Southern strategy ====
In 1968 and 1972, Nixon pursued a "Southern strategy," seeking to support from white voters in the former Confederate states who had abandoned the Democratic Party over the prior decades. As a result, many Republicans rejected Rockefeller's open embrace of the civil rights movement in order to appeal to its opponents. The strategy was successful, pulling many conservative Democratic voters into the Republican Party, further weakening the Rockefeller wing.

==== Decline in union membership ====
Given Rockefeller's support for public works projects, he and his allies offered contingent support to labor unions, especially the construction trades which relied on public works for employment. In turn, the unions gave Rockefeller Republicans sufficient support to overcome the conservative, rural element within the party. As unions weakened during the 1970s, so too did Rockefeller Republicans. Declining union membership and support enhanced the political power of the fusionists, who opposed labor unions generally and no longer needed to cooperate with them to carry statewide elections.

=== Aftermath ===
Since the Reagan era, Rockefeller Republicans have been relegated to the fringes of the party or pushed out of politics entirely. During the 1990s, both parties developed a consensus in favor of laissez-faire economics and limited government, with many Rockefeller Republicans supplanted by conservatives, fusionists, and Democratic Party members from the Blue Dog or New Democrat coalitions. Michael Lind contends that during the presidency of Bill Clinton, even the Democratic Party was in many ways to the right of Rockefeller. In a 1997 interview, Elliot Richardson expressed similar views.

During the presidency of Barack Obama, the Tea Party movement gained traction partly as an outlet for criticism of government stimulus to the economy and the Troubled Asset Relief Program, drawing parallels to criticisms of Rockefeller. In 2010, E. J. Dionne wrote in The Washington Post that the primary defeat of Delaware U.S. representative Mike Castle marked "the collapse of the Republican Party not only of Nelson Rockefeller and Tom Dewey but also of Bob Dole and Howard Baker." Other candidates accused of Rockefeller-style liberalism, including 2008 presidential nominee John McCain, Pennsylvania senator Arlen Specter, and Alaska senator Lisa Murkowski, have been pressured to change their views or leave the party.

== Political positions ==
Generally speaking, the Rockefeller Republicans were liberal or progressive on issues involving racial or sexual politics or cultural issues, including racial integration, affirmative action, and abortion rights, while vehemently rejecting broader, ideological arguments for limited government and low taxation in favor of a pragmatic, technocratic, and interdisciplinary approach to government. Historian Geoffrey Kabaservice has argued that "Rockefeller Republicans" should be distinguished from the more moderate and less ideological "Eisenhower Republicans," including George W. Romney.

Rockefeller Republicans strongly supported capitalism, rejecting both socialism and state ownership in favor of welfare spending and limited state regulation through public–private partnerships. Their economic program has drawn comparisons to the French doctrine of dirigisme or the developmental state in East Asia. Rockefeller Republicans also strongly supported government and private investment in socially and economically beneficial causes, including higher education, environmental protection, public highways, and healthcare.

=== Healthcare ===
Many Rockefeller Republicans supported proposals for expanded health insurance coverage, including proposals for a national health insurance program, and Rockefeller himself described healthcare as "a basic human right." Although Jacob Javits called for "Medicare for All" in 1970, most Rockefeller Republicans preferred market solutions to reach universal health coverage, including proposals for the government to reinsure private insurers against catastrophic losses, subsidies for privately managed plans, and mandates for employers or individuals to purchase health insurance.

=== International relations ===
In foreign policy, Rockefeller Republicans tended to espousing internationalist and realist policies, supporting the United Nations and promoting American business interests abroad. Most supported the use of American military and diplomatic power in cooperation with allies to fight the Cold War.

== Modern usage as political label ==
Since Rockefeller's death in 1979, the term "Rockefeller Republican" has become archaic and during the early most commonly used by conservative Republicans as a pejorative. However, some modern figures, including New Jersey governor Christine Todd Whitman, Goldman Sachs executive Lloyd Blankfein, and retired generals Colin Powell and David Petraeus have described themselves as Rockefeller Republicans. The label has also been adopted by members of the Democratic Party who were formerly moderate Republicans, including U.S. representative John Yarmuth.

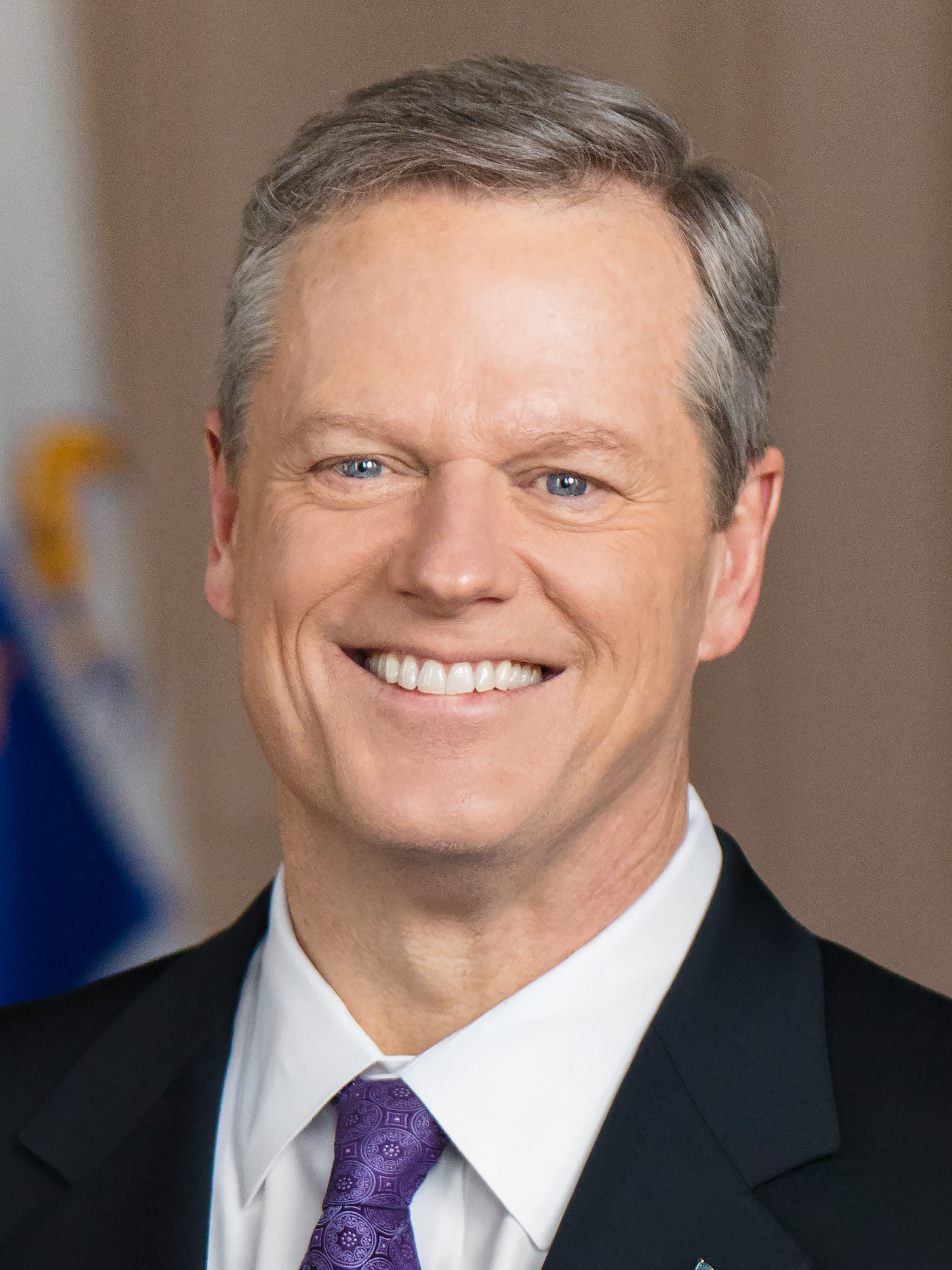
Charlie Baker

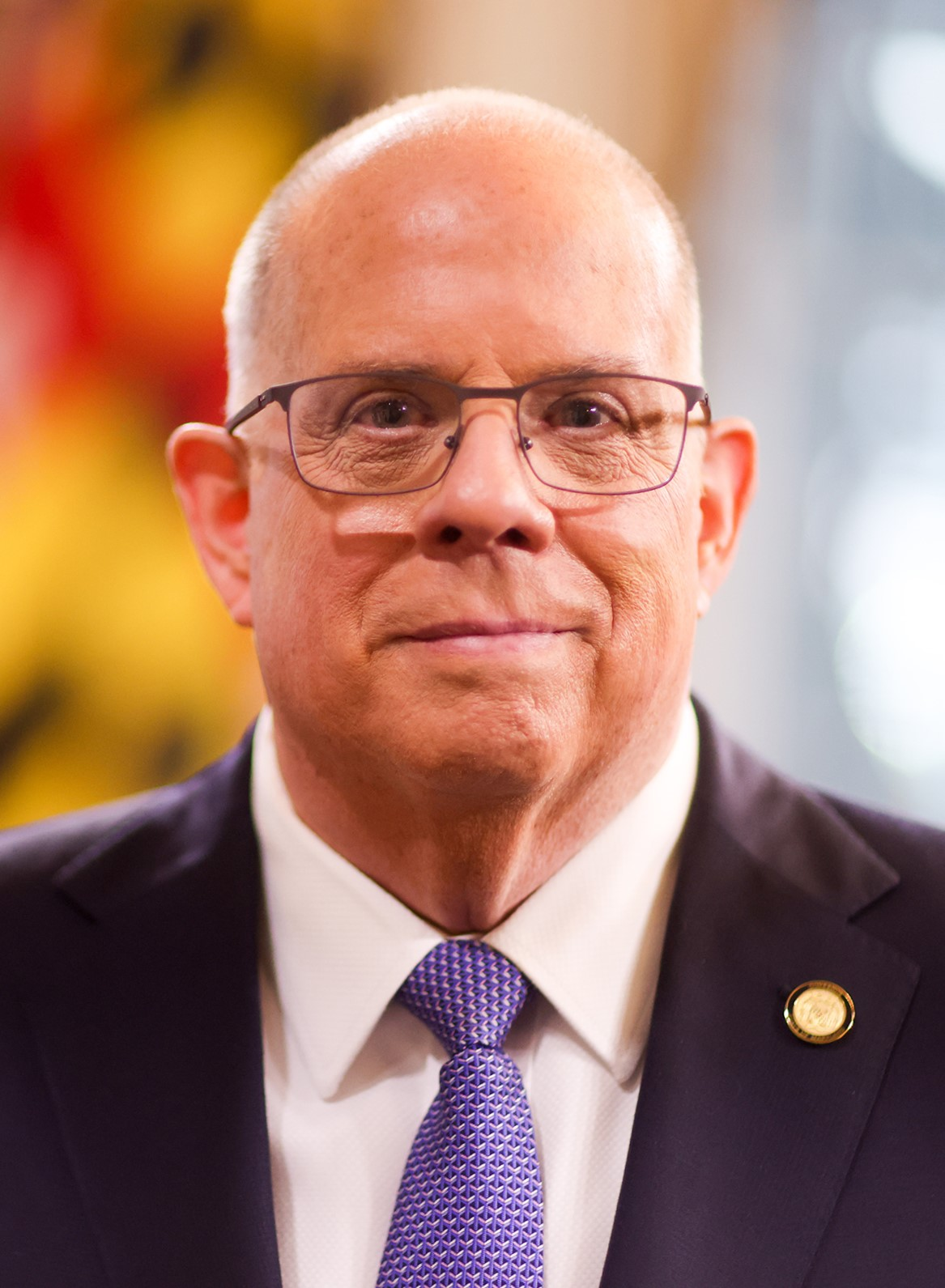
Larry Hogan

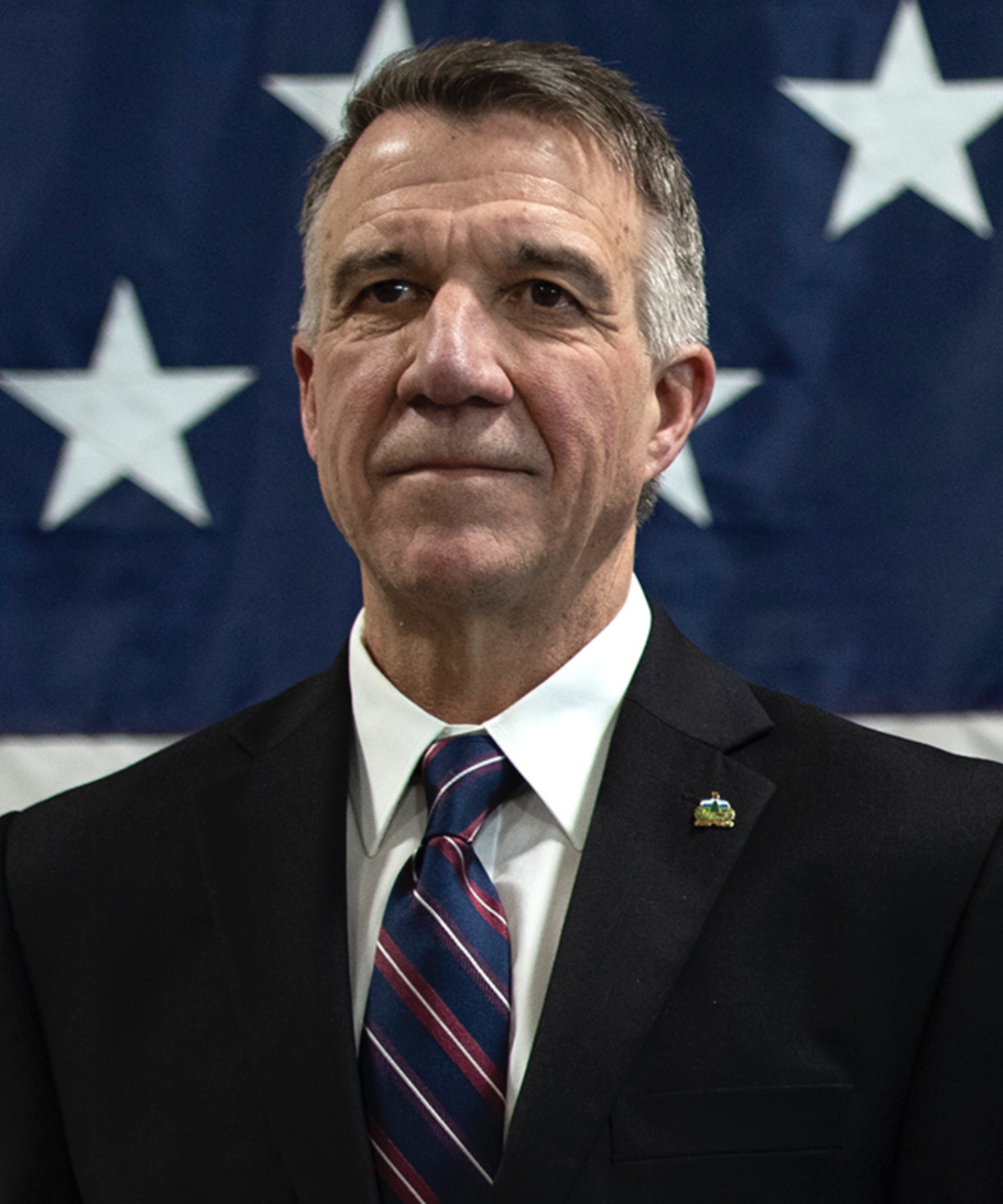
Phil Scott

Former Massachusetts governor Charlie Baker, former Maryland governor Larry Hogan, and current Vermont governor Phil Scott have been cited as modern examples of Rockefeller Republicans

In 2014, self-identified liberal or moderate Republicans Charlie Baker, Larry Hogan, and Phil Scott won gubernatorial elections in their respective Democratic states of Massachusetts, Maryland, and Vermont. The Atlantic likened the winning candidates' platforms to "Rockefeller-style liberal Republicanism," even though the Rockefeller label was not used by the candidates themselves. In 2018, each governor was reelected by landslide margins. Their continuing popularity led Karl Salzmann to write in National Review, "A kind of Rockefeller Republicanism seems to be rising once again in recent years." Other New England politicians, such as Maine senators Olympia Snowe and Susan Collins, New Hampshire governor Chris Sununu, and Massachusetts senator Scott Brown, have been identified as Rockefeller Republicans.

Since 2015, commentators have debated whether United States president Donald Trump is a Rockefeller Republican. During his 2016 campaign for the presidency, some conservative writers labelled Trump a Rockefeller Republican for his rejection of the conservative institutional and ideological constraints of the party and apparently moderate views on certain social issues. Others instead identified Trump with Goldwater for his disruption of the status quo and embrace of political extremism. When asked by Larry King whether he identified as an "Eastern Republican, Rockefeller Republican" at the 1988 Republican National Convention, Trump responded, "I guess you can say that."

== Politicians identified as Rockefeller Republicans ==
Prominent figures identified or associated with the Rockefeller wing during their political careers include New York City mayor John Lindsay, Maryland senator Charles Mathias, Connecticut senator Prescott Bush, Pennsylvania governor Raymond P. Shafer, Pennsylvania senator Hugh Scott, Illinois senator Charles H. Percy, Oregon senator Mark Hatfield, New York senator Jacob Javits, Arkansas governor Winthrop Rockefeller (Nelson's brother), Massachusetts senator Edward Brooke, Rhode Island senator John Chafee, and Connecticut senator Lowell Weicker.

Some have argued that Richard Nixon was a bona fide member of the Rockefeller wing. Although Nixon and Rockefeller were opposed in the 1960 and 1968 Republican presidential primaries, and Nixon was widely identified with cultural conservatism, he adopted several Rockefeller policies during his time as president, such as establishing the Environmental Protection Agency and Occupational Safety and Health Administration, imposing wage and price controls, accepting the core of his predecessor's Great Society social welfare programs, and publicly announcing his adherence to Keynesian economics in 1971. However, Nixon also vetoed the Clean Water Act and sought to significantly reform the Great Society, such as dismantling the Office of Economic Opportunity and seeking to replace Aid to Families with Dependent Children with his proposed Family Assistance Plan.

=== U.S. vice presidents ===
- Nelson Rockefeller, 41st U.S. vice president and 49th governor of New York

=== U.S. secretaries of state ===
- Henry Kissinger, former foreign policy advisor to Rockefeller

=== U.S. senators ===
- Edward Brooke, former U.S. senator from Massachusetts
- Clifford P. Case, former U.S. senator and representative from New Jersey
- John Chafee, former U.S. senator from Rhode Island
- Jacob Javits, former U.S. senator and representative from New York
- Thomas Kuchel, former U.S. senator from California
- Charles Mathias, former U.S. senator and representative from Maryland
- Charles Percy, former U.S. senator from Illinois
- Richard Schweiker, former U.S. senator from Pennsylvania and 14th U.S. secretary of health and human services
- Hugh Scott, former U.S. senator from Pennsylvania and Senate minority leader
- Arlen Specter, former U.S. senator from Pennsylvania (switched parties to Democratic)
- Ted Stevens, former U.S. senator from Alaska
- John Warner, former U.S. senator from Virginia
- Lowell Weicker, former U.S. senator and 85th governor of Connecticut (switched parties to A Connecticut Party, then became an independent)

=== U.S. representatives ===
- John B. Anderson, former U.S. representative from Illinois (left the party to run for president as an independent candidate)
- Nancy Johnson, former U.S. representative from Connecticut
- John Lindsay, former U.S. representative and mayor of New York City (switched parties to Democratic)
- Chris Shays, former U.S. representative from Connecticut
- Rob Simmons, former U.S. representative from Connecticut

=== State governors ===
- William Scranton, former governor of Pennsylvania
- Christine Todd Whitman, former governor of New Jersey (switched parties to Forward as founding co-chair)

== See also ==
- Country club Republican
- Factions in the Republican Party (United States)
- New York Young Republican Club
- One-nation conservatism
- Paternalistic conservatism
- Republican Main Street Partnership
- Republican In Name Only
- Ripon Society
- Roosevelt Republican
- South Park Republican
