= The Promise of American Life =

1909 book by Herbert Croly

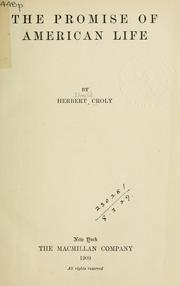
- Author: Herbert David Croly
- Language: English
- Genre: political philosophy
- Publication date: 1909
- Publication place: United States
- Text: The Promise of American Life at Wikisource

The Promise of American Life is a book published by the American political philosopher Herbert Croly, founder of The New Republic, in 1909. This book opposed aggressive unionization and supported economic planning to raise the general quality of life. By Croly's death in 1930, only 7,500 copies of The Promise of American Life had been sold. Despite this, the book was immensely influential, influencing Theodore Roosevelt to adopt the platform of the New Nationalism after reading it, and being popular with intellectuals and political leaders of the later New Deal.

== Background ==
The book is said to "offer a manifesto of Progressive beliefs" that "anticipated the transition from competitive to corporate capitalism and from limited government to the welfare state."

For Croly, the individualistic, libertarian America of the agrarian 18th and 19th centuries was gone, swept away by the forces of the industrial revolution, urbanization, centralization and modernity. He advocated a new political consensus that included as its core nationalism, but with a sense of social responsibility and care for the less fortunate. Since the power of big business, trusts, interest groups and economic specialization had transformed the nation in the latter part of the 19th century, only the embracing of a counterbalance to this power would serve the society of the future. Croly pressed for the centralization of power in the federal government to ensure democracy, a "New Nationalism".

In Croly's view, "the traditional American confidence in individual freedom has resulted in a morally and socially undesirable distribution of wealth." He argued for a national government that was more rather than less powerful than it had been, as a bulwark against what he regarded as overbearing self-interest, greed, corruption, and unchecked power. At the same time, Croly valued the individual motivated by civic virtue and "constructive individualism" and urged all to pursue this objective.

== Hamiltonian means vs. Jeffersonian values ==
According to David Kennedy in his book Progressivism: The Critical Issues, Croly talks of a "new liberal democratic theory, which emphasized not individualism but social consciousness, and which spoke less of freedom than it did of social control." This idea was called "Hamiltonian means", which in the book is defined as "the establishment of federal regulatory commissions, staffed by experts, to oversee the big corporate enterprises whose existence he [Croly] accepted and even welcomed." In Croly's view, the emphasis on individualism associated with Thomas Jefferson's liberal democratic theory was irrelevant in a time of great reform and that its revival would be counterproductive in the restoration of American democracy that was taking place during the Progressive Era. Croly then suggests that "Hamiltonian means must be employed to secure Jeffersonian ends." To Croly, this meant that to fulfill the promise of American life there needed not to be "a maximum amount of economic freedom, but by a certain amount discipline" and "not merely by the abundant satisfaction of individual desires, but by a large measure of individual subordination and self-denial."

== Positive reviews ==
After reading The Promise of American Life, former President Theodore Roosevelt wrote the following:

In Mr. Herbert Croly's "Promise of American Life," the most profound and illuminating study of our National conditions which has appeared for many years, especial emphasis is laid on the assertion that the whole point of our governmental experiment lies in the fact that it is a genuine effort to achieve true democracy—both political and industrial.

== Negative reviews ==
The Promise of American Life has received criticism from a number of angles. Some feared the underlying tones of totalitarianism or fascism. Others worried that Croly's plan would make America socialist—a criticism Croly foresaw in his book and attempted to combat by labeling his government as nationalistic rather than socialistic. Even those who believed Croly's government could be democratic had concerns that Croly's vision for the country was clouded by a Republican prejudice. His writing contained several criticisms of the Democrats but almost none of the Republicans. Croly's book was also criticized for its lack of national focus. It focused almost entirely on problems that were of interest to those living in cities but not to rural America. The tariff, conservation, currency, banking, and agriculture all were only mentioned in passing, if at all. Connected to that was an argument that Croly's plans were unrealistic and detached from the reality that many Americans were living.
