= New Nationalism (Theodore Roosevelt) =

Political philosophy during the 1912 US presidential election

- PROGRESSIVE (THE BULL MOOSE PARTY) T.R. HAT My Hat Is Still In The Ring
- Date: August 31, 1910
- Location: Osawatomie, Kansas, U.S.
- Participants: Theodore Roosevelt
- Outcome: Codified the ideology of the Progressive faction of the Republican Party. Regulation of monopolies and corporate campaign contributions, commissions to regulate interstate commerce, institutionalized the push for social justice, including a national health service and an eight-hour workday. Directly led to the formation of the Progressive "Bull Moose" Party

The New Nationalism was a policy platform first proposed by former President of the United States Theodore Roosevelt in a speech in Osawatomie, Kansas, on August 31, 1910.

The progressive nationalist policies outlined in the speech would form the basis for his campaign for a third term as president in the 1912 election, first as a candidate for the Republican Party nomination and then as a Progressive.

== Background ==
Theodore Roosevelt returns to the US after a year abroad in Africa and Europe and is welcomed back with a parade (June 1910)

Shortly after the installation of his former Secretary of War, William Taft, into the Presidency, Theodore Roosevelt left to embark on the Smithsonian-Roosevelt Expedition in the wilderness of Africa.

On the return leg of the Africa trip, Roosevelt conducted a speaking tour throughout Europe in which he gave notable speeches in France. On the same trip, he attended the state funeral of King Edward, whom he was scheduled to meet before his untimely death.

Throughout this time, Roosevelt began to sour on the policies of the Taft administration. In the summer of 1910, Roosevelt would mount another effort to win the Presidency back, this time from his chosen successor.

== Speech and campaign ==
Ohio (1910)

As noted by one historian, "Theodore Roosevelt's political views lurched further to the left after his departure from the White House." This was demonstrated when Roosevelt made the case for what he called "the New Nationalism" in a speech in Osawatomie, Kansas, on August 31, 1910. The central issue he argued was government protection of human welfare and property rights, but he also argued that human welfare was more important than property rights. He insisted that only a powerful federal government could regulate the economy and guarantee justice, and that a President can succeed in making his economic agenda successful only if he makes the protection of human welfare his highest priority. Roosevelt believed that the concentration in industry was a natural part of the economy. He wanted executive agencies, not courts, to regulate business. The federal government should be used to protect the laboring men, women and children from exploitation.

Commenting on the speech, one journal noted that

It requires only a very cursory reading of the speech to see that Mr. Roosevelt is one of the most radical of the "progressives." Whether or not he has in mind any such contingency as separating from the Republican party in case his views as outlined at Osawatomie are not incorporated in future platforms there is, of course, no indication. But we believe there is not an article in the creed of Senators La Follette, Cummins and the other so-called "insurgents," that he does not unqualifiedly accept.

Further adding to this point, the same journal noted

The question that most immediately suggests itself in regard to the speech is therefore not "Is there going to be a third party headed by Roosevelt, Cummins, La Follette, Pinchot, Garfield?"-but rather "How much of this program of radical or progressive Republicanism will the radical or progressive wing of the party under the picturesque and aggressive leadership of Roosevelt be able to write into the party platforms and make effective in Congress during the next six or eight years?" And once again, only time will tell.

In terms of policy, Roosevelt's platform included a broad range of social and political reforms advocated by progressives.

=== Progressive National Convention ===
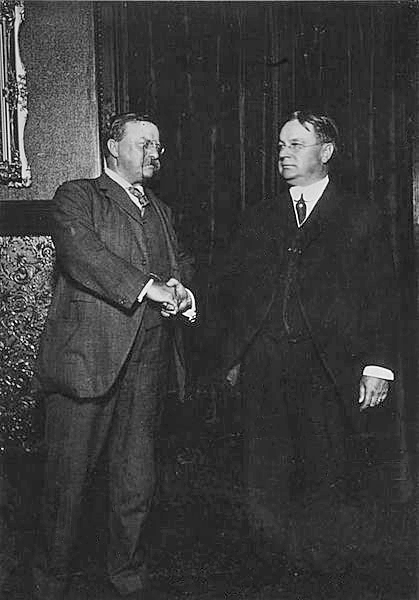
Theodore Roosevelt and Hiram Johnson, full-length portrait, standing, shaking hands after being nominated as presidential and vice-presidential candidates for the Progressive or Bull-moose party.

Chicago - Coliseum (1912) site of the Progressive National Convention

The Progressive National Convention of 1912 held in Chicago served as the climax of the movement.

== Socioeconomic policy ==
In the socioeconomic sphere, the platform called for the following:

- A National Health Service to include all existing government medical agencies
- Social insurance to provide for the elderly, the unemployed, and the disabled.
- Limited injunctions in strikes.
- A minimum wage law for women.
- An eight-hour workday.
- A federal securities commission.
- Farm relief.
- Workers' compensation for work-related injuries.
- An inheritance tax.
- A constitutional amendment to allow a federal income tax.

== Electoral reform ==
The electoral reforms proposed included

- Women's suffrage.
- Direct election of Senators.
- Primary elections for state and federal nominations.

== Anti-corporatocracy proposals ==
The main theme of the platform was an attack on what he perceived as the domination of politics by business interests, which allegedly controlled both established parties. The platform asserted:

To destroy this invisible Government, to dissolve the unholy alliance between corrupt business and corrupt politics is the first task of the statesmanship of the day.

To that end, the platform called for the following:

- Strict limits and disclosure requirements on political campaign contributions.
- Registration of lobbyists.
- Recording and publication of Congressional committee proceedings.

== Influences and comparisons ==
Herbert Croly's 1909 book, The Promise of American Life, influenced Theodore Roosevelt to adopt the platform of New Nationalism and was popular with intellectuals and political leaders of the later New Deal.

New Nationalism was in direct contrast with Woodrow Wilson's policy of The New Freedom, which promoted antitrust modification, tariff reduction, and banking and currency reform.

In terms of policy, Roosevelt's platform included a broad range of social and political reforms advocated by progressives. According to Nathan Miller, in his Osawatomie speech:

Foreshadowing the modern welfare state, he advocated positive action by the national government to advance equality of opportunity, justice, and security for all. Graduated income and inheritance taxes, a revamped financial system, a comprehensive workmen's compensation law, a commission of experts to regulate the tariff, limitations on the political activities of corporations, stringent new conservation laws, and regulation of child labor were all parts of his grab a bag of reforms.

According to Lewis L. Gould, "The Progressive party did not go as far as the New Deal of Franklin D. Roosevelt would, but it represented a long step in that direction."

On the other hand, President William Howard Taft told his brother, "I think the 'New Nationalism' proclaimed in the Osawatomie speech has frightened every lawyer in the United States and has greatly stirred up the indignation and fear of the thinking part of New England and the Middle States."

== Quotations ==
- "I do not ask for overcentralization; but I do ask that we work in a spirit of broad and far-reaching nationalism when we work for what concerns our people as a whole. We are all Americans. Our common interests are as broad as the continent. I speak to you here in Kansas exactly as I would speak in New York or Georgia, for the most vital problems are those which affect us all alike."
- "The essence of any struggle for healthy liberty has always been, and must always be, to take from some one man or class of men the right to enjoy power, or wealth, or position, or immunity, which has not been earned by service to his or their fellows. That is what you fought for in the Civil War, and that is what we strive for now."
- "We grudge no man a fortune in civil life if it is honorably obtained and well used. It is not even enough that it should have gained without doing damage to the community. We should permit it to be gained only so long as the gaining represents benefit to the community."
- "The leader for the time being, whoever he may be, is but an instrument, to be used until broken and then to be cast aside; and if he is worth his salt he will care no more when he is broken than a soldier cares where he is sent, where his life is proffered in order that the victory may be won. In the long fight for righteousness the watchword for all of us is "spend and be spent.""

== See also ==
- Political positions of Theodore Roosevelt
- Square Deal
- Progressive nationalism
- Bull Moose Party
- The New Freedom, of Woodrow Wilson
- New Deal, of Franklin Roosevelt
- Fair Deal, of Harry Truman
