= Caliber System =

American logistics and transportation holding company

Caliber System Inc.
- Formerly: Roadway Services Inc. (1982-1996)
- Industry: Transportation
- Founded: 1982; 44 years ago in Akron, Ohio
- Defunct: January 1998
- Fate: Acquired by FedEx
- Successors: FedEx Ground; FedEx Freight; FedEx Custom Critical; FedEx Global Logistics
- Headquarters: Akron, Ohio, United States
- Subsidiaries: At acquisition: Caliber Logistics; Caliber Technology; Roberts Express; RPS; Viking Freight; Prior to acquisition: Central Freight Lines (1993-1996); Cole's Express (1993-1996); Nationwide Carriers (1984-1989); Roadway Express (1982-1996); RGA (1993-1995); Spartan Express (1984-1990)

Caliber System Inc., known until 1996 as Roadway Services Inc., was a transportation holding company based in Akron, Ohio, United States. During its history, Caliber owned a number of logistics companies including Roadway Express, Viking Freight and Roadway Package System (RPS) among others. Roadway Express was spun off in 1995 and Caliber was acquired by FedEx in 1998 with subsidiaries becoming FedEx Ground, FedEx Freight, FedEx Custom Critical and FedEx Global Logistics.

== History ==
=== Foundation and diversification ===
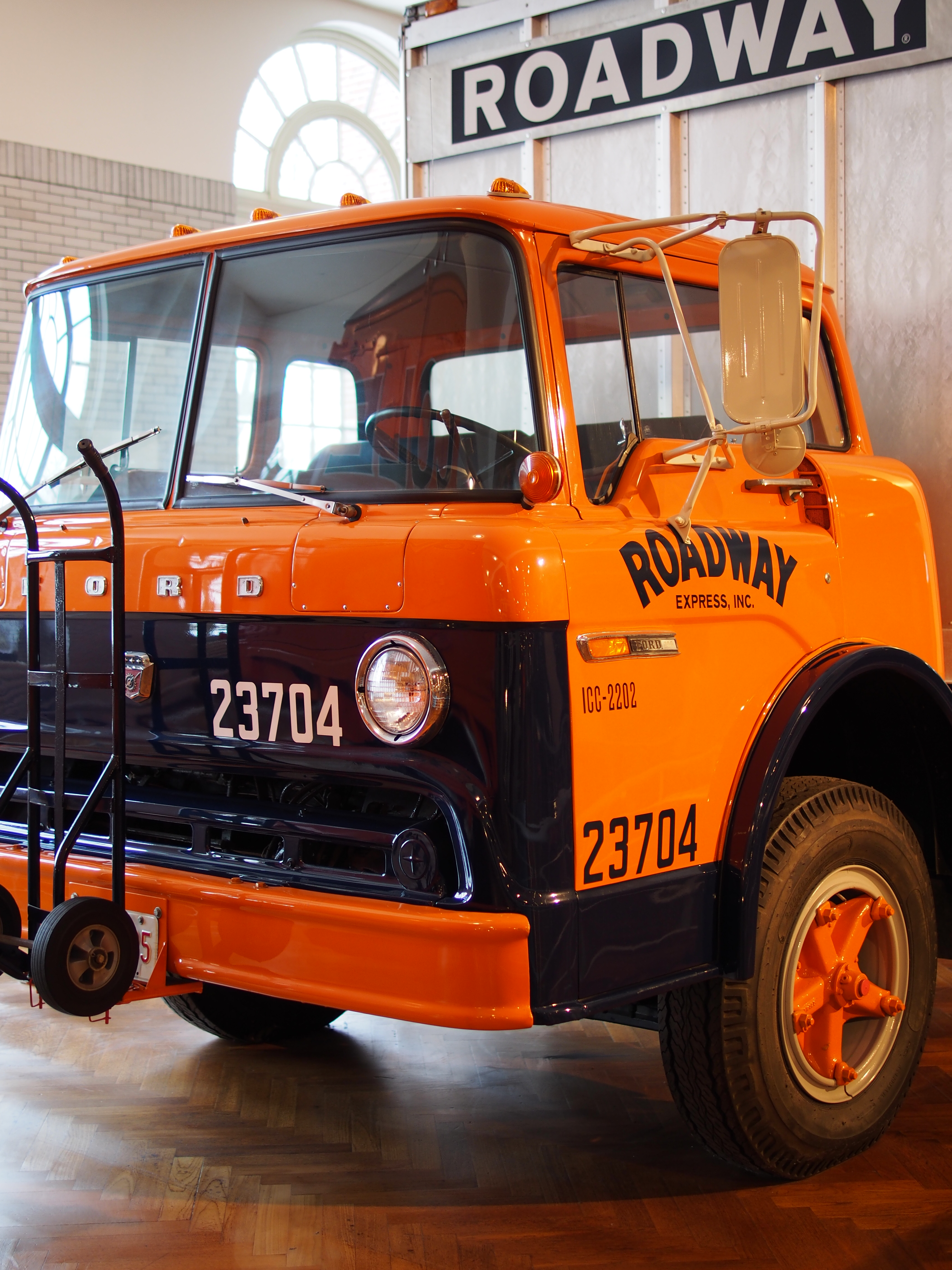
A vintage Roadway Express truck

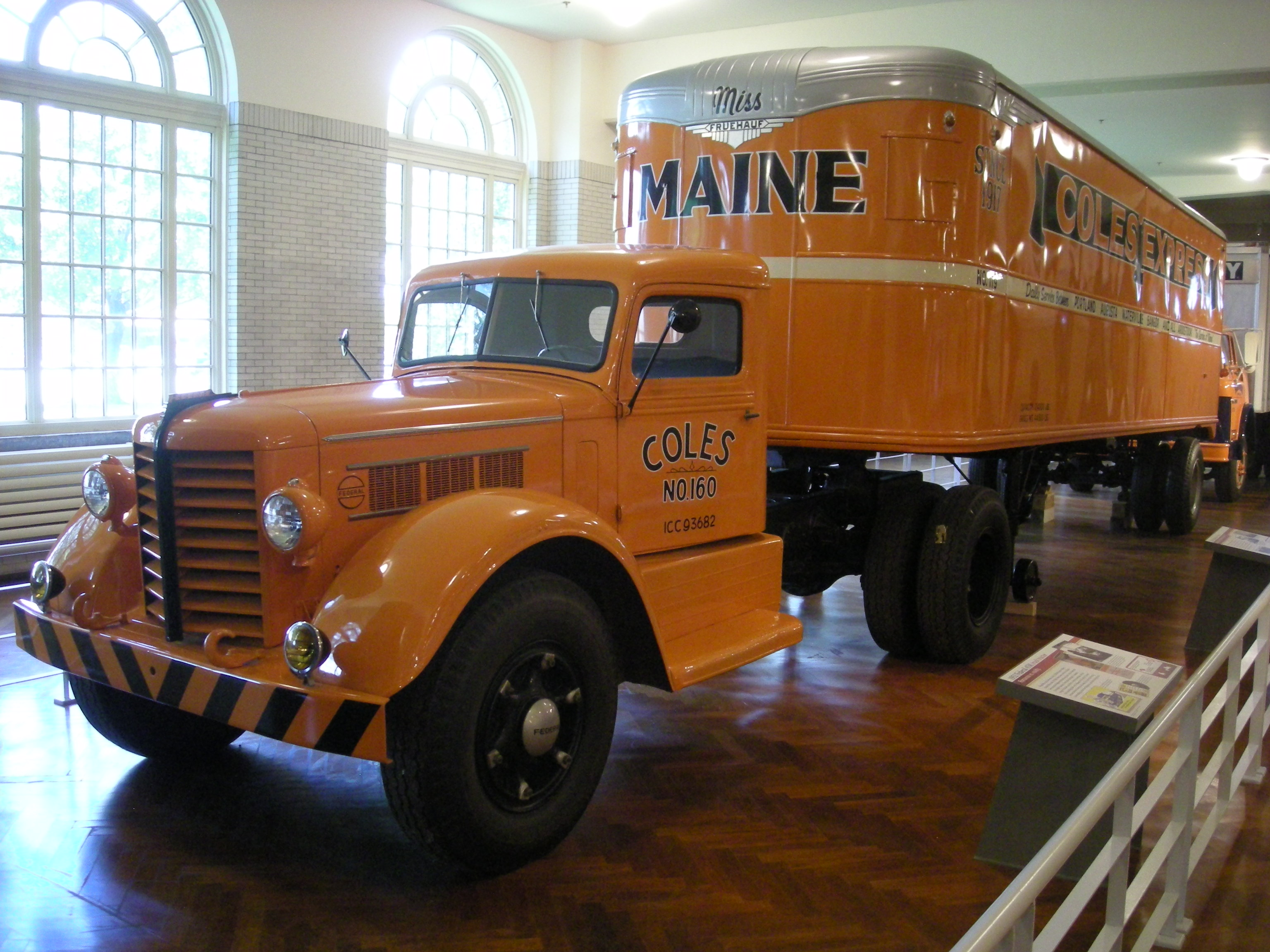
An original Coles Express truck. Coles was acquired by RSI in 1993.

Roadway Services Inc. (RSI) was created in 1982 as a holding company by national less than truckload (LTL) carrier Roadway Express. Roadway Express was initially RSI's only subsidiary but in 1984 the company acquired short-haul carrier Spartan Express Inc., then specialized truckload carrier Nationwide Carriers Inc., and finally in 1984, it purchased Roberts Express, a same-day critical trucking company, from Emery Air Freight.

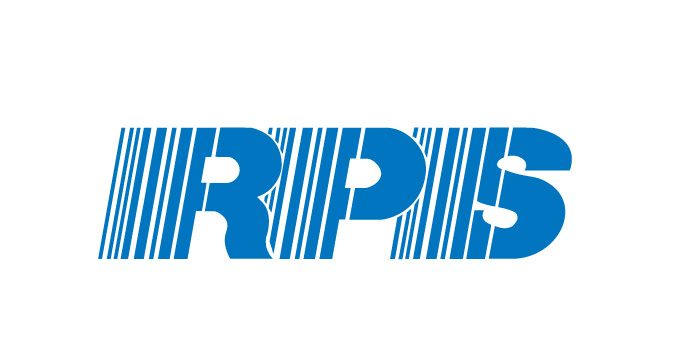
Logo of Roadway Package System (RPS)

With both truckload and LTL services available via its subsidiaries, in 1985 RSI founded a package delivery service, Roadway Package System (RPS) in Pittsburgh, Pennsylvania. RPS was intended to out-compete the package delivery services of UPS by structuring itself for lower costs. By 1988, RPS covered 70% of the US from 130 terminals.

In the late 1980s and early 1990s RSI experienced both expansion and contraction as it acquired the largest western US regional carrier, Viking Freight, but closed the unprofitable Nationwide Carriers in 1989. In 1990, Viking subsidiary VFS Transportation was closed and Spartan was absorbed into Viking, operating as a subsidiary. At the same time Roadway Express continued its expansion with services to Europe in 1991 and a number of Pacific Rim ports soon after. Also in 1991, RSI replaced Pan Am Corp. on the Dow Jones Transportation Average. At the time, RSI was the third-largest motor freight carrier in the US.

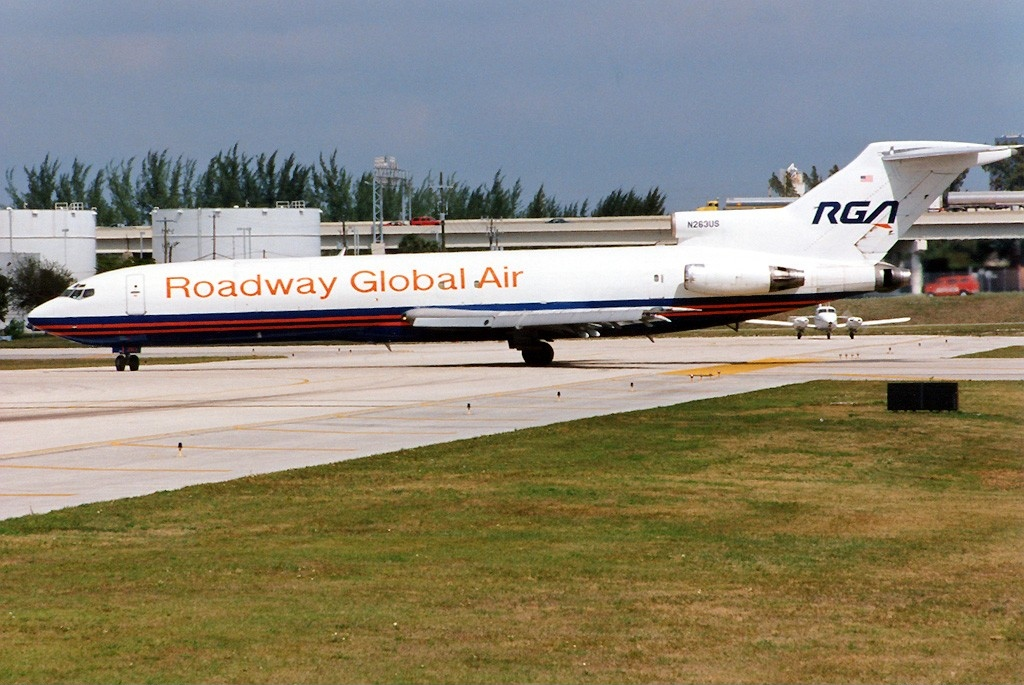
RSI launched Roadway Global Air in 1993

In 1993, RSI acquired Southwest regional LTL carrier Central Freight Lines which it placed in its Roadway Regional Group along with Viking in the West, Viking subsidiary Spartan in the central and southern US and Cole's Express in New England. RSI also expanded into air freight with its 1993 founding of Roadway Global Air (RGA) based in Indianapolis.

=== Roadway Express spinoff ===
While RSI's smaller regional carriers were all non-union, Roadway Express was unionized and in April 1994 it was impacted by a nationwide strike of the Teamsters Union. The strike was the result of a breakdown in negotiations between the Teamsters and Trucking Management Inc., a negotiating group which represented 23 large trucking companies including Roadway Express, Consolidated Freightways, and Yellow Freight. In the end, the strike lasted 24 days and, according to the RSI, resulted in losses of US$68 million for the quarter at Roadway Express.

The strike at Roadway Express highlighted the division's profitability imbalance when compared to RSI's non-union carriers. At the time, Roadway Express contributed over 40% of the parent company's US$5 billion annual revenue but was less profitable than the other trucking units. As a result, RSI announced in August 1995 that it would spin off Roadway Express as a separate, publicly traded company. As an independent company, Roadway Express grew substantially achieving profits of US$21.8 million in its first year. In 2003 Roadway was acquired by Yellow Freight to form Yellow Roadway Corporation.

=== Caliber System ===
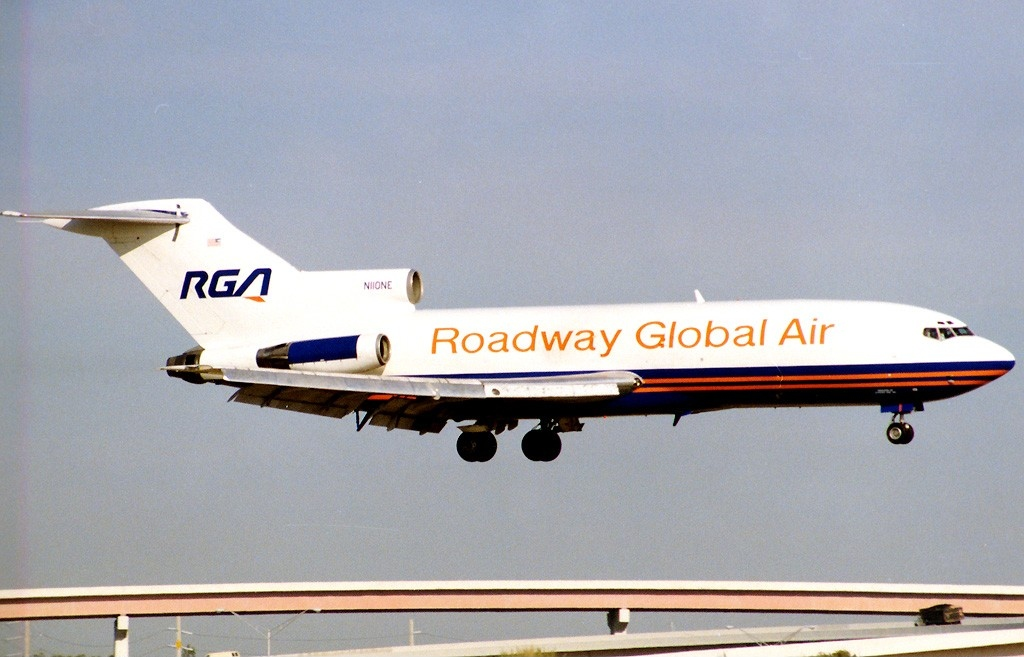
An RGA Boeing 727. RGA operated for less than two years before it was shut down and its assets were sold to Burlington Air Express.

In November 1995, Roadway Services announced it was changing its name to Caliber System, effective in January 1996 and would move its stock listing from the Nasdaq to the NYSE under the new symbol "CBB." It also rebranded Roadway Logistics and Roadway Technology to Caliber Logistics and Caliber Technology, respectively.

Caliber immediately began an effort to reorganize in an attempt to decrease costs. In November it shut down RGA and sold the assets to Burlington Air Express. Caliber said it had lost US$103 million on the venture. In December it announced it would be consolidating its remaining trucking companies, Viking (with subsidiary Spartan), Central, and Cole's into a nationwide carrier named Viking Freight Inc. But, Caliber continued to experience significant losses.

Viking announced a wage freeze in July 1996 and in December said it would be eliminating 30 terminals and 1,500 jobs in a bid to reduce costs. Despite positive performances from RPS, Roberts, and Caliber Logistics in Q1 1997, Caliber announced in March it would be selling or closing a large portion of the eastern operations of Viking leaving it as a west coast-focused carrier.

Caliber reported Viking had seen losses of around US$127 million after having been unable to bring Viking to profitability since merging its smaller, regional carriers into a nationwide offering. The cuts were expected to include 4,000 jobs and 83 terminals in the eastern, southern, and central US. These areas had been primarily served by the former Coles and Spartan subsidiaries. In June 1997, Caliber sold the assets that had formerly comprised Central to an investment group led by former Central leadership backed by trucking magnate and Swift Transportation co-founder Jerry Moyes. It was re-incorporated as Central Freight Lines and continued as an independent regional LTL carrier.

=== Acquisition by FedEx ===
In January 1998, Caliber System was acquired by the newly formed FDX Corp., now FedEx Corp, a company formed by Federal Express to serve as a holding company for its express business and its new, Caliber subsidiaries. Following the acquisition, former Caliber subsidiary Roadway Express (Nasdaq: ROAD) took Caliber's place on the Dow Jones Transportation Average.

== Fate of subsidiaries ==
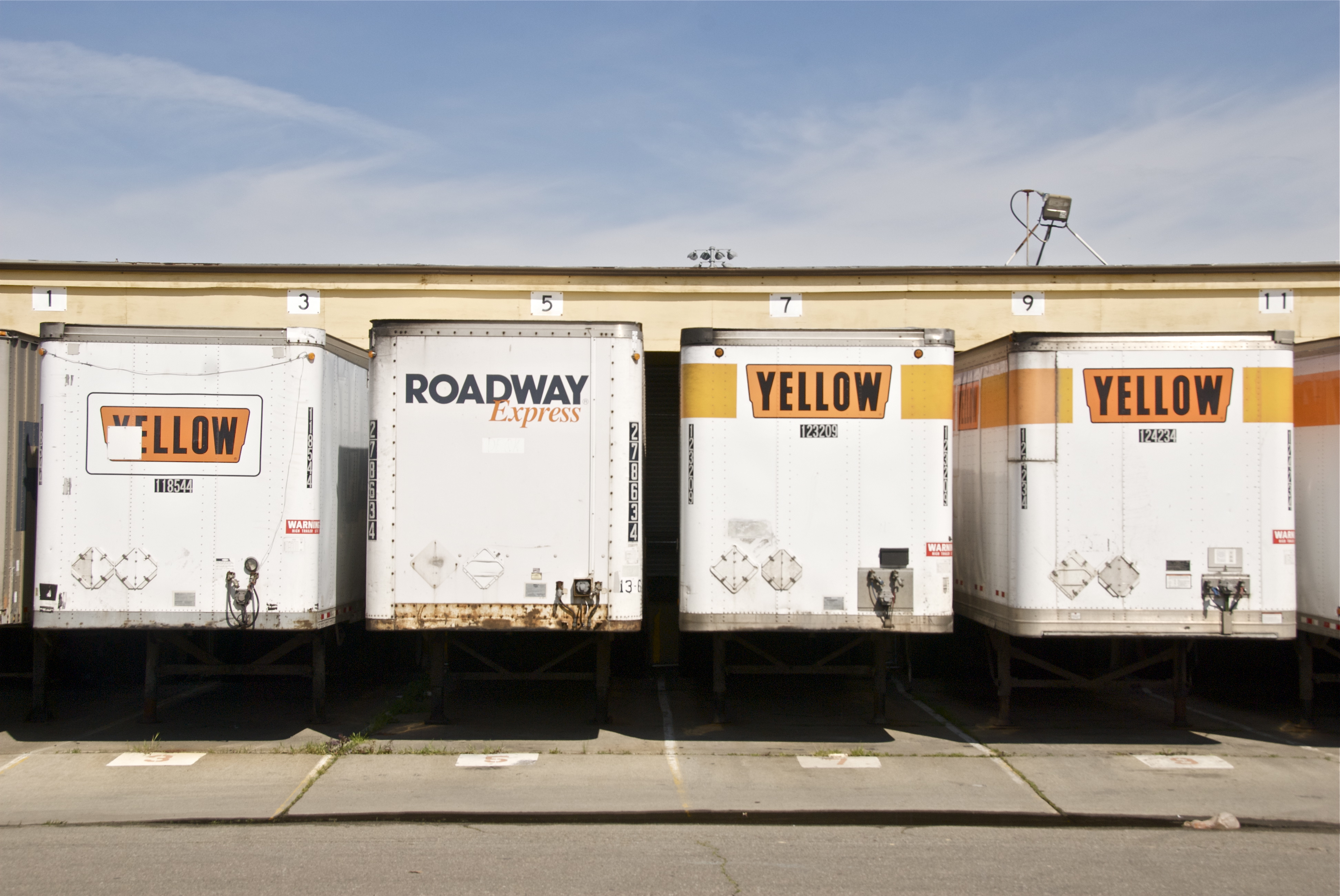
Roadway Express eventually merged with rival Yellow

In the years prior to its acquisition by FedEx, Caliber had already spun off, sold, or shut down several major subsidiaries:

- Nationwide Carriers, its truckload subsidiary, shut down in 1988 and its operations were absorbed by Viking
- Roadway Express was spun off as an independent, publicly traded company in 1995. It was acquired by rival Yellow Corp. in 2003 to form Yellow Roadway Corporation.
- Roadway Global Air was shut down in 1995 and its assets were sold to Burlington Air Express.
- Spartan Express had been made a subsidiary of Viking in 1990 and was merged into Viking in 1996. Its former operations were shut down in 1997 when Viking pulled out of the southeast.

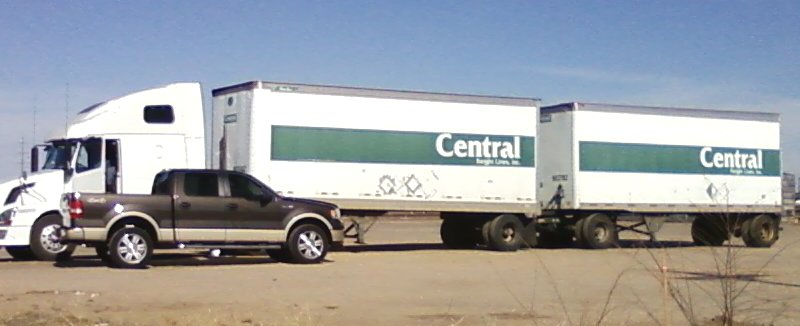
Central was reconstituted from its former assets

- Coles Express had been merged into Viking in 1996 and its former operations were shut down in 1997 when Viking pulled out of the northeast.
- Central Freight Lines former assets (Viking's central operations) were sold to former Central management in 1997 and resumed independent operations.

At the time of its acquisition by FedEx, Caliber had five major subsidiaries remaining:

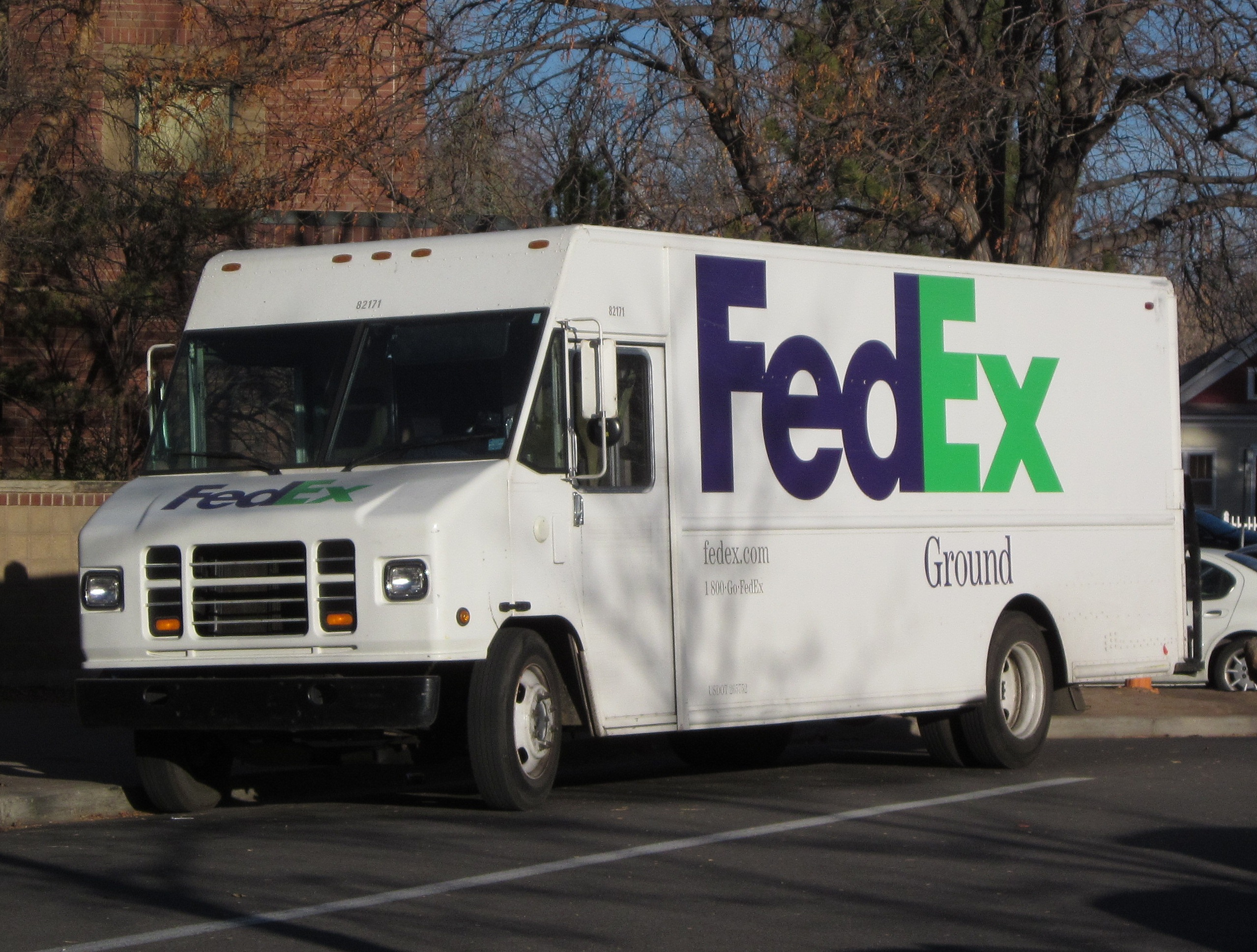
FedEx Ground delivery vehicle. RPS became FedEx Ground in 2000.

- RPS became FedEx Ground in January 2000 complementing FedEx's existing Federal Express courier business.

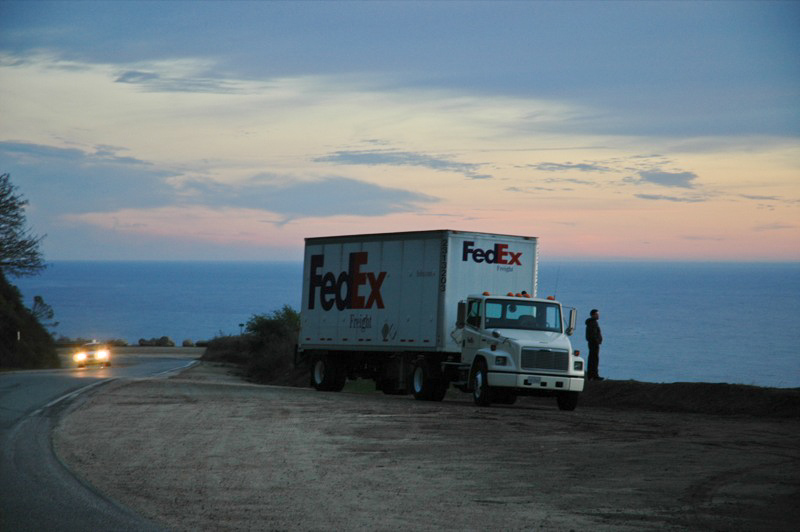
Viking eventually became FedEx Freight

- Viking continued until 2002 when it was renamed FedEx Freight West, part of the new FedEx Freight brand along with American Freightways, renamed FedEx Freight East. With the 2006 acquisition of Watkins Motor Lines, all three were integrated into a single entity, FedEx Freight.
- Roberts remained focused on same-day-critical trucking services and was renamed FedEx Custom Critical in January 2000.
- Caliber Logistics and Caliber Technology were merged to form FedEx Global Logistics shortly after the acquisition.

== See also ==
- Trucking industry in the United States
- History of the trucking industry in the United States
- Package delivery in the United States
- FedEx Express
- Media related to Caliber System at Wikimedia Commons
