= Central Freight Lines =

Former American LTL freight trucking company

Central Freight Lines, Inc.
- Company type: Private
- Industry: Transportation
- Founded: 1925; 101 years ago in Waco, Texas
- Founder: William W. "Woody" Callan
- Defunct: 2021
- Headquarters: Waco, Texas, United States
- Area served: Southeastern US; Southwestern US
- Owner: Jerry Moyes
- Parent: Roadway Services (1993–1997)
- Website: centralfreight.com

Central Freight Lines Inc. (CFL) was an American regional less-than-truckload (LTL) company headquartered in Waco, Texas and serving the Southeastern and Southwestern United States. For much of its history it was the largest and longest tenured freight carrier in Texas and in 2021 ranked 21st on Transport Topics top LTL carriers in the US as of 2021 with estimated revenues of US$256 million.

On December 11, 2021 CFL announced it would be ceasing operations with final freight pickups on December 13 followed by a full wind-down of the company.

== History ==
=== Founding and early growth ===
The company was founded in 1925 by 20-year-old William W. "Woody" Callan as Central Forwarding Warehouse Company and mostly did local moves of household goods with a single Ford Model-T truck. Callan's experience was working for Sanger Brothers Dry Goods Company and Weathered Transfer and Storage Company which led to contacts he used to start the business. The company incorporated in 1927 and by 1928 was running regular routes between Dallas, Fort Worth, and Austin.

When the Texas Legislature passed the Motor Carrier Law of 1929 prohibiting common carriers from transporting other classes of goods Central was forced to split its household-goods business as Central Forwarding Inc. from its general freight services, renamed Central Freight Lines (CFL). The two operated independently but shared leadership, facilities, and equipment. CFL continued expansion adding San Antonio and Houston services in 1933. By 1938, it had 200 employees, 85 trucks and 25 trailers. During World War II, Callan continued to run both companies while also running the Warehousing Branch, Headquarters Army Services of Supply from offices in Atlanta and the Pentagon.

By 1951, CFL's growth had far outpaced that of its sibling company and the two more formally split. Central Forwarding eventually changed its name to Central Transportation Systems, and was acquired by Spectrum Relocation Group of El Paso, Texas in 2005 where it operated as a subsidiary of Spectrum's Appleton Moving Company division.

In 1952, Callan stepped down as president of CFL but remained chairman of the board. With his leaving, Callan initiated an Employee Stock Ownership Plan and later the 1959 introduction of a profit-sharing pension plan. Callan remained chairman until his death on March 17, 1987. By 1955, CFL had 1,100 employees and operated 900 trucks.

=== Regional expansion ===
In 1979, Callan's son, Woody Callan, Jr., became president and led the company through what would prove to be a challenging decade. CFL faced challenges internally from a push toward unionization and externally from the Motor Carrier Act of 1980 deregulation. Despite this, it continued to expand in the late 1980s, particularly into west Texas. In 1991, CFL expanded to interstate services after receiving 48-state operating authority from the Interstate Commerce Commission and began expanding in the south-central states.

Callan, Jr. and his sister, Diana Callan Braswell, both retired from CFL in 1992 selling their stock to the company's profit-sharing and retirement plan. This turned CFL into an employee-owned company. At the time, CFL was responsible for hauling over half of intrastate freight in Texas.

=== Acquisition by Roadway Services ===
In 1993, CFL's management and shareholders, including its employee-owners, agreed to sell the company to Akron, Ohio-based parcel and freight logistics company, Roadway Services Inc. (RSI). CFL became a subsidiary of RSI's Roadway Regional Group with a focus on the Southwest. This group also included Viking Freight in the western US, Spartan Express (operated as a subsidiary of Viking) in the southeast, and Coles Express in the northeast.

Under RSI, CFL initially continued to grow eventually covering the rest of the south-Central US plus much of the Midwest. Joe Hall was appointed CFL's new president in 1995 in the midst of significant competitive pressure on the company from further federal trucking deregulation. As an established, Texas-based carrier, CFL had been the beneficiary of Texas' tight regulation of intrastate trucking. However, deregulation had the effect of stripping the Texas Railway Commission of its power, significantly increasing competition in the state.

On top of this, CFL's parent, RSI, was facing internal conflict. RSI's regional carriers were non-union but employees of Roadway Express, RSI’s national LTL carrier, were unionized under the Teamsters. Over the years, the Teamsters had negotiated salary and benefit packages for Roadway Express workers up to 30% higher than RSI's non-union workers. With slim margins in the LTL industry, this meant Roadway Express, despite representing over 40% of RSI's US$5 billion annual revenue, was less profitable than its sibling carriers. The situation was brought to a head in 1994 when a 24-day Teamsters strike resulted in Roadway Express losing US$68 million for the quarter.

In August 1995, RSI announced it would spin off Roadway Express as a separate, publicly traded company. Eight years later in 2003, Roadway Express would be acquired by Yellow Corporation to form Yellow Roadway Corporation.

=== End of independent CFL operations ===
After completing the spin-off, Roadway Services changed its name to Caliber System on December 14, 1995 and four days later announced consolidation of its regional carriers (CFL, Coles, Spartan, and Viking), into a nationwide carrier called Viking Freight Inc. The following year, CFL formally became the Southwest Division of Viking. This marked the end of separate operations for Central Freight Lines.

Caliber, however, was unable to realize the expected efficiencies of the move. This meant that by 1997 it was actively seeking a buyer and was rapidly shedding assets including its former Coles and Spartan east-coast operations. The prospect of a total shutdown led former CFL management, including former president Joe Hall, to open negotiations to buy the former carrier. They would succeed in 1997 when Caliber sold them a significant portion of former CFL operations.

Caliber was acquired by FedEx in 1998 and Viking continued under FedEx as a West Coast LTL carrier. In 2001, FedEx acquired American Freightways and the following year renamed it FedEx Freight East and renamed Viking FedEx Freight West. After acquiring Watkins Motor Lines in 2006, FedEx integrated all of its LTL services into a single entity, FedEx Freight.

== Modern company ==
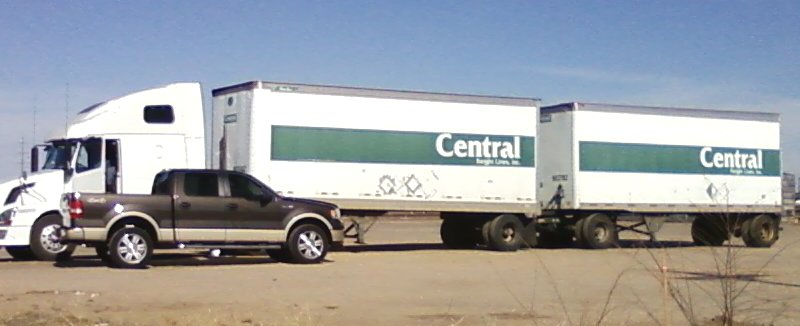
Central Freight Lines truck with dual trailers in 2003

The investment group which re-established CFL had been financed by Jerry Moyes and his brother Ronald Moyes. The Moyes had a long history in trucking having co-founded Swift Transportation with their father in 1966 and overseen its growth to one of the largest carriers in the US. When CFL was re-established on June 30, 1997 with Hall as president, Jerry Moyes was its principal stockholder and the Moyes' together owned a significant portion of the new company.

In May 1999, CFL announced its intention to issue a public offering of 5 million shares via an IPO but following the announcement, it acquired Arizona-based Jaguar Fast Freight, California and Nevada-focused Vecta Transportation, and Texas-based Aggie Express. According to Moyes, these acquisitions meant CFL needed to postpone its IPO to 2000.

By January 2000, CFL reported it was in excellent financial health and projected revenues over $300 million by year end. Hall, who had been instrumental in rebuilding CFL, stepped down as President later in the year for personal reasons and was replaced in the interim by board member Ronald Moyes.

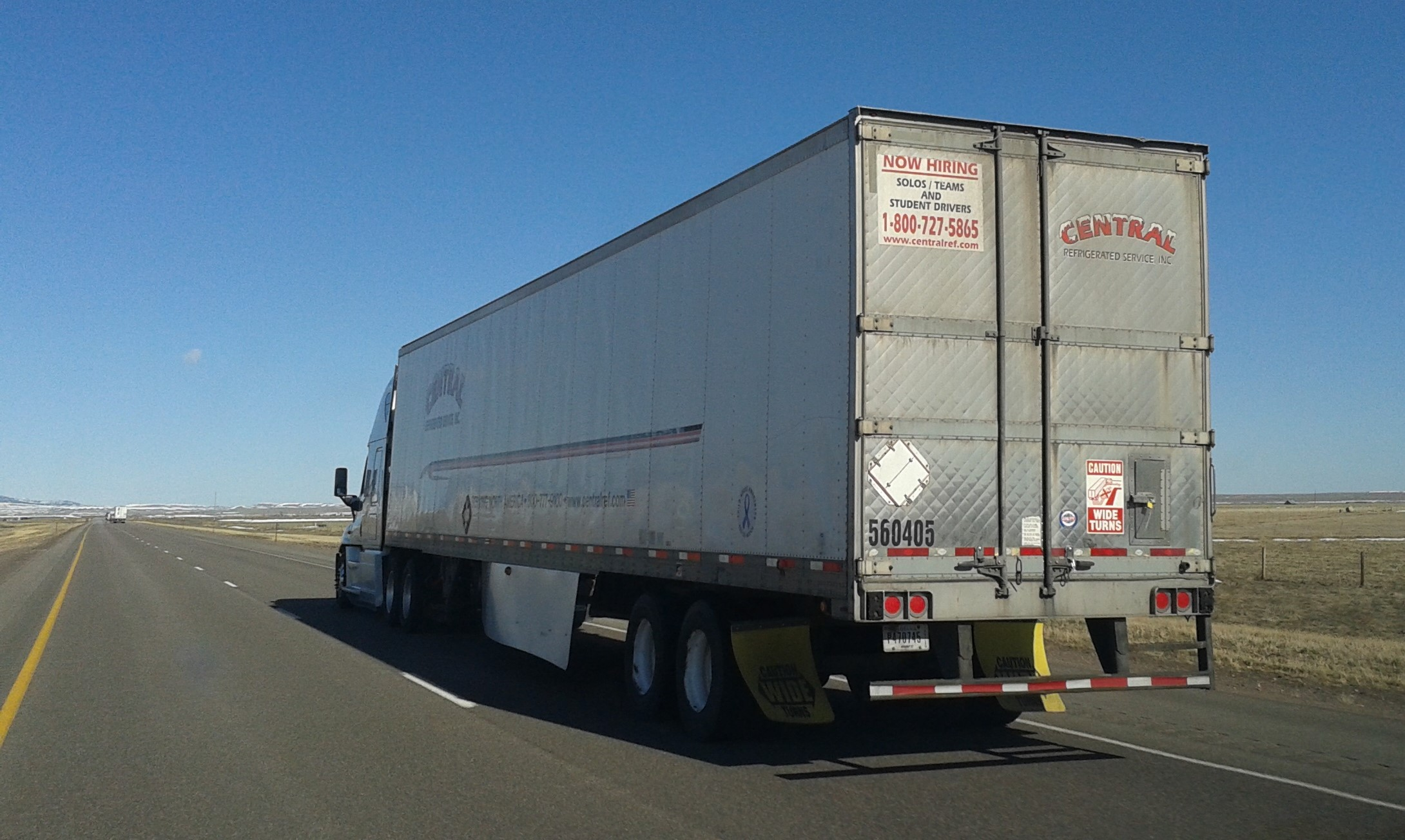
Central Refrigerated Service truck

In 2002, CFL acquired Utah-based refrigerated trucking service provider Simon Transportation Services (and subsidiary Dick Simon Trucking) out of Chapter 11 bankruptcy protection. Simon was renamed Central Refrigerated Service and immediately after the acquisition, projected it would be profitable on revenues of approximately US$200 million annually. The turnaround was largely attributed to shedding over 30% of Simon's tractors and trailers. Before the end of 2002, Central Refrigerated Service was spun out as a separate entity wholly owned by Moyes who would sell it to Swift in 2013.

On December 1, 2003, after a three year delay, Central Freight Lines finally went public on the Nasdaq stock exchange with the symbol CENF. The IPO raised US$127.5 million. In 2006, the company was taken private again by Jerry Moyes.

Moyes had been forced out of his position as chairman and CEO at Swift in October 2005 after an SEC investigation into insider trading allegations involving the Phoenix Coyotes NHL team. Around the same time, Moyes had stepped down from CFL's board reportedly due to clashes with the Teamsters Union who alleged Moyes was redirecting freight from CFL to his other companies. However, in January 2006 Moyes related entities still owned 31.5% of CFL and he made an offer to acquire the remainder.

As part of the deal, CFL would absorb one of Moyes' other carriers, North American Truck Lines. Initially Moyes had planned to have CFL continue as a public company. However, just prior to completing the deal, he amended the agreement to avoid financing requirements. The company would be taken fully private. CFL's stock was delisted on November 27, 2006, and the change in ownership was completed on the 28th.

Following this restructuring, CFL refocused on expansion through acquisitions including 2013 purchase of Circle Delivery Service of Tennessee, the LTL operations of Georgia-based Drug Transport Inc. (DTI) in 2014, and the 2017 acquisition of Wilson Trucking Corporation, a Virginia-based LTL carrier focused on the Southeastern US. The addition of Wilson's assets brought CFL's network up to 80 terminals nationwide. In 2020, CFL acquired Volunteer Express, an LTL and FTL carrier based in Nashville.

=== Closure ===
In December 2020, Moyes stepped in as interim CEO and president in an effort to address the company's financial difficulties. Along with Moyes' installation, the company made major changes to the rest of its executive team. In September 2021 the company sold its 37-acre Waco headquarters facility to a group of local investors with a lease-back allowing CFL to continue to use the facility through December 2022.

On December 11, 2021 Bruce Kalem, CFL president from July 2021, confirmed rumors that the company had notified drivers, employees, and customers that it intended to wind down operations beginning December 13th. Kalem also confirmed that the shut down was the result of long-term operating losses resulting in an inability to service debt and outstanding bills. At the time of this announcement, the company had approximately 2,100 employees including 1,325 drivers. During wind-down of CFL operations, Richmond, Virginia-based LTL carrier Estes Express Lines expressed interest directly to CFL in hiring many of CFL's drivers and made offers for some CFL equipment.

CFL's failure was the largest trucking industry closure since the shutdown of truckload carrier Celadon Group in 2019. According to Kalem, the issues which led to CFL's closure had begun with the loss of a major customer in 2016 in the midst of a debt-financed four-year fleet replacement which ended in 2017.

== Operations ==
=== Service area ===
Originally a Texas intrastate carrier, CFL expanded its services into the south-central US in the early 1990s and, while owned by Roadway Services in the mid 1990s, the southwest. After reestablishment as an independent company in 1997, CFL extended its services into the southeast through acquisition of several smaller LTL carriers.

As of August 2021, CFL provided state-wide services in 14 southeastern and southwestern states and a portion of 3 additional states.

=== Facilities ===
CFL's operations were supported by 76 terminals across 16 states with 20 of those in Texas.

=== Sustainability ===
CFL was a member of the EPA's SmartWay Transport Partnership in which shippers, carriers, and related companies volunteer to achieve certain fuel efficiency and emissions benchmarks. In 2012, CFL became one of the first LTL carriers in the US to purchase compressed natural gas (CNG) tractors for daily use. The company cited reduced environmental impact of CNG trucks and reduced dependency on foreign fuels as drivers for the move.

Further investment in CNG followed in 2013 with the purchase of over 100 Freightliner and Peterbilt CNG tractors. The same year, CFL and CNG supplier Questar opened one of Houston's first CNG fueling stations. By 2017, CFL had established CNG stations in Fort Worth and San Antonio where it reported that over 90% of its local operations used CNG tractors.

=== Corporate affairs ===
Central was one of four trucking-related companies to receive the maximum available $10 million in Paycheck Protection Program funding in 2020.

== See also ==
- Trucking industry in the United States
- History of the trucking industry in the United States
- Railroad Commission of Texas: State agency formerly responsible for regulation of intrastate trucking
- Waco, Texas: CFL was founded in and is currently headquartered in Waco
