= Roadway (disambiguation) =

A roadway is the width of road on which a vehicle is not restricted by any physical barriers.

It may also refer to:

- Roadway Services, a trucking company

== See also ==
- Rodeway Inn, a motel chain
