= FedEx Home Delivery v. NLRB =

FedEx Home Delivery v NLRB
- Court: United States Court of Appeals for the District of Columbia Circuit
- Full case name: FedEx Home Delivery, a Separate Operating System of FedEx Ground Package System, Inc., Petitioner v. National Labor Relations Board, Respondent, International Brotherhood of Teamsters, Local No. 25, Intervenor.
- Argued: November 7, 2008
- Decided: April 21, 2009
- Citation: 563 F3d 492 (DC Cir. 2009)

Case history
- Argument: Oral Arguments

Court membership
- Judges sitting: Janice Rogers Brown; Stephen F. Williams; Merrick Garland

Case opinions
- Majority: Brown
- Dissent: Garland

Keywords
- Collective bargaining, right to organize

FedEx Home Delivery v NLRB 563 F3d 492 (DC 2009) is a US labor law case on the scope of protection for labor rights. This case has been criticized that it "has generated judicial decisions that are difficult to parse and often treat workers unfairly."

== Facts ==
Post truck drivers claimed that FedEx should engage in collective bargaining with them, and by not doing so committed an unfair labor practice. FedEx argued they were not entitled to a collective agreement because, under the National Labor Relations Act of 1935, they were independent contractors because they took on "entrepreneurial opportunity".

FedEx's lawyer was Ted Cruz.

== Judgment ==
Brown J held the drivers were independent contractors, applying the multi-factor totality test. This now focused on whether the person's position 'presents the opportunities and risks inherent in entrepreneurialism.' Williams J agreed.

Garland J dissented. He introduced with the following.

In National Labor Relations Board v. United Insurance Co. of America, the Supreme Court held that Congress intended "the Board and the courts" to "apply the common-law agency test ... in distinguishing an employee from an independent contractor" under the National Labor Relations Act (NLRA). 390 U.S. 254, 256, 88 S.Ct. 988, 19 L.Ed.2d 1083 (1968). In this case, the National Labor Relations Board (NLRB) applied that multi-factor test and concluded that FedEx Home Delivery's drivers are the company's employees. My colleagues disagree, concluding that the drivers are independent contractors.

This is not merely a factual dispute. Underlying my colleagues' conclusion is their view that the common-law test has gradually evolved until one factor — "whether the position presents the opportunities and risks inherent in entrepreneurialism" — has become the focus of the test. Op. at 497, 503. Moreover, in their view, this factor can be satisfied by showing a few examples, or even a single instance, of a driver seizing an entrepreneurial opportunity. Id. at 502.

Although I do not doubt my colleagues' sincerity, I detect no such evolution. To the contrary, the Board and the courts have continued to follow the Supreme Court's injunction that "there is no shorthand formula or magic phrase that can be applied to find the answer, but all of the incidents of the relationship must be assessed and weighed with no one factor being decisive." United Ins., 390 U.S. at 258, 88 S.Ct. 988. The common-law test may well be "unwieldy," Op. at 497, but a court of appeals may not "'displace the Board's choice between two fairly conflicting views, even though the court would justifiably have made a different choice had the matter been before it de novo.'"

== See also ==
- United States labor law
