= Wabash National =

American manufacturing company

Wabash National Corporation
- Type: Public
- Traded as: NYSE: WNC
- Industry: Transportation
- Founded: 1985
- Headquarters: Lafayette, Indiana, U.S.
- Area served: Worldwide (except China, Europe and Oceania)
- Key people: Brent Yeagy, President/CEO
- Products: Semi-trailers
- Revenue: ▼1.54 billion USD (2025)
- Net income: ▲211 million USD (2025)
- Number of employees: c. 6,000
- Website: onewabash.com

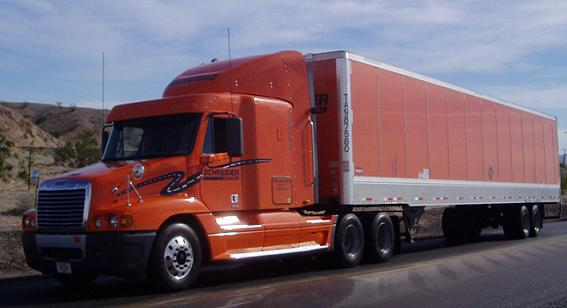
SNC Trailer

Wabash (formerly Wabash National) is an American diversified industrial manufacturing company and one of North America's largest producers of semi-trailers and truck bodies. The company specializes in the design and production of dry freight vans, refrigerated vans, platform trailers, liquid tank trailers, truck bodies and composite products.

Previously, its products were sold primarily under: Wabash National, Transcraft, Benson, Walker Transport, Brenner Tank, Bulk Tank International and Supreme. In 2022, the company consolidated under the Wabash brand name. The company operates a number of Parts & Services centers throughout the United States. In 2024, the total revenue was 1.95 billion USD.

== History ==
Wabash National was founded by former Monon Corporation employees seeking to escape corporate raider Victor Posner. In 1985, the company was formed by Jerry Ehrlich as president, Ronald Klimara as vice president of finance, and William Hoover as vice president of sales. They were joined by a small group of Monon employees. Jerry's brother Rodney served as head of engineering. Based in Lafayette, Indiana, it started out making trailers for Sears. Other early customers were Heartland Express, Dart Transit, Federal Express, Swift Transportation, Triple Crown Services, and Schneider National. By 1986, the company had $70 million in sales from 15,000 trailers. By 1990, Wabash had $170 million in sales.

Wabash became a publicly traded company in 1991. In 1992, it launched Wabash National Financial Corporation, a subsidiary that allowed customers to finance the purchases of Wabash trailers. From 1992 to 1994, Schneider was its biggest customer, accounting for one-sixth of its sales. By 1995, it reported $500 million in revenue and employed 3,400 people. The company acquired the US manufacturing and sales distribution business of Fruehauf Trailer in 1997. It also acquired Cloud Corporation, based in Harrison, Arkansas, and Cloud Oak Flooring Company of Sheridan, Arkansas, to produce laminated hardwood flooring for its trucks. The business was consolidated to create Wabash Wood Products, based in Harrison.

In 2000, the company acquired the Breadner Group of Kitchener, Ontario to expand its retail network into Canada. Following a peak of 5,000 employees in the 1990s, the company had 3,000 personnel at the beginning of 2001. A slowdown in orders resulted in a major restructuring and a series of layoffs. In March 2001, 500 jobs were eliminated as part of a cost-cutting initiative. Additional layoffs cut the workforce down to 2,000 before another 480 roles were eliminated in January 2002. However, a sudden increase in orders resulted in the company rehiring these employees and hiring an additional 100 just six weeks later.

In 2003, Wabash sold off its trailer leasing and rental, as well as its wholesale aftermarket parts distribution businesses to Aurora Trailer Holdings. The sale helped the company pay down its debts. The company hired over 400 employees in 2004 to meet growing production needs. Wabash acquired Transcraft Corporation for $71 million in 2006. It acquired certain assets from Benson International in 2008. It also formed a purchasing consortium with Kentucky Trailer, Utilimaster, Federal Signal Corporation, and VT Specialized Vehicles.

During the Great Recession, orders diminished, resulting in significant financial hardship for the company. At the end of 2008, Wabash announced an extended holiday shutdown, where 800 jobs would be permanently eliminated. By February 2009, cost reduction actions had eliminated more than 25% of the workforce since 2007. The company also temporarily reduced salaries, cut the standard paid work week, and introduced a voluntary furlough program to manage overhead costs. Eventually, 40% of the salaried workforce and nearly 70% of hourly employees were laid off. Wabash was able to stay afloat when it received $35 million in financing from Lincolnshire Management.

On May 8, 2012, Wabash National completed the acquisition of Walker Group Holdings for $376 million. The deal gave Wabash control of the Walker, Brenner, Bulk, TST, Progress, Garsite, and Extract brand names.

In 2013, Wabash spent $15 million to acquire assets from Beall Corp's tank and trailer business. This included equipment, inventory, product designs, intellectual property and other related assets. It also involved the acquisition of a Portland, Oregon manufacturing facility.

On September 27, 2017, Wabash National completed the acquisition of Supreme Industries, Inc. In January 2019, Wabash announced it had sold off its Aviation and Truck Equipment division. President and COO Brent Yeagy took over as company CEO in June.

In February 2022, the company announced it would rebrand under one simplified name: Wabash. The Benson, Brenner, Bulk Tank, Supreme, Transcraft, and Walker sub-brands were eliminated. Company trucks were rebranded starting in July.

In February 2025, Wabash acquired TrailerHawk.ai and established its trailer-as-a-service offerings.

== Products ==
Wabash National's product lines include a variety of dry freight vans, refrigerated vans, converter dollies, platform trailers, liquid tank trailers, intermodal equipment, engineered products and composite products. They also make high-quality laminated oak flooring used extensively in dry van trailers, truck bodies, and containers.

Wabash's initial innovation was the aluminum plate trailer. When most competitors were using aluminum-covered plywood, Wabash's method reduced wasted space, water damage claims, and repair costs.

In 1987, the company manufactured the RoadRailer, a trailer capable of being used on roads and railway tracks, for Thrall Car Manufacturing. Wabash purchased the rights in 1991 and became the exclusive manufacturer. In 1992, it began licensing the production of RoadRailers for international markets. Starting with Australia, it was soon licensing to six firms in 19 countries.

Wabash began manufacturing refrigerated van trailers in 1995. The following year, the company introduced its DuraPlate composite panel technology for semi-trailers. It was later adapted for other industrial and commercial uses. The company produced its 200,000th DuraPlate trailer in 2004 and 500,000th in 2013. DuraPlate HD, for heavy duty hauls, was introduced in 2003.

By 2008, Wabash established a new division dedicated to further applications for DuraPlate. In 2009, Wabash National expanded into portable storage container manufacturing. The company also introduced DuraPlate AeroSkirt, which focused on increased aerodynamics for better fuel economy.

In 2011, Wabash National introduced the industry's first dry freight van with a 35,000-pound floor rating, allowing heavy cargo typically hauled on a flatbed trailer to be transported in a dry van. In 2015, Wabash introduced its first line of dry- and refrigerated-truck bodies. Production was based in Lafayette, Indiana.

In 2022, Wabash debuted its trailer as a service offering, a subscription-based solution that provides guaranteed uptime, managed care, maintenance, and telematics. It also established the Wabash Parts distribution network, a consolidation of the company's entire aftermarket portfolio behind a new e-commerce website. Additionally the Acutherm sub-brand was developed to offer intelligent thermal management.

In 2023, Wabash established a joint venture with Fernweh Group to expand its e-commerce offerings. Soon after, the Wabash Marketplace digital platform was launched to bring the company's offerings together into one ecosystem.

== Facilities ==
Wabash National is headquartered in Lafayette, Indiana, also the site of its main production facility. Additional manufacturing plants are located in Harrison, Arkansas; Kansas City, Kansas; Portland, Oregon; New Lisbon, Wisconsin; Fond du Lac, Wisconsin; and San Jose Iturbide, Guanajuato, Mexico.

Wabash's initially leased a facility located just 30 miles south of Monon Corporation. By 1986, the company was able to purchase a more suitable facility in Lafayette for $2.5 million. A second Lafayette facility was acquired in 1994, tripling its capacity.

In 2001, the business underwent a restructuring that resulted in the closure of assembly plants in Fort Madison, Iowa, and Scott County, Tennessee, as well as a parts distribution facility in Montebello, California. Retail distribution sites in Little Rock, Tampa, and Fresno were also shut down.

As part of its 2008 acquisition of Benson International, Wabash also gained a 180,000-square-foot manufacturing facility in Cadiz, Kentucky. In 2010, the company closed its Anna, Illinois facility and consolidated its Transcraft operations in Cadiz.

The company opened a manufacturing facility in Little Falls, Minnesota in 2017. Starting in 2018, Wabash began opening up fitting facilities under the Supreme name, starting in Griffin, Georgia and Cleburne, Texas. A third location in Tampa, Florida opened in 2019.

In 2023, Wabash converted its Lafayette facility to manufacture dry van trailers. By 2025, the company had service facilities in California, Florida, Georgia, Ohio, Pennsylvania, and Texas. That year, it opened additional locations in Gary, Indiana and Atlanta, Georgia. Another location was opened in Phoenix in 2026.

In 2026, the company announced the closure of its manufacturing facilities in Goshen, Indiana and Little Falls, Minnesota.

The company operates a network of dealerships in North America called Wabash National Trailer Centers.
