= Jerry Moyes =

American businessman (born 1944)

- Born: January 15, 1944 (age 82); Plain City, Utah, U.S.
- Education: Weber State College
- Occupation: CEO of Swift Transportation
- Years active: 1966–2016
- Spouse: Vickie Moyes

Jerry Moyes is an American businessman who is the founder, former chairman, and former CEO of Phoenix-based Swift Transportation, a trucking company in the United States. Moyes also owned charter airline Swift Air which later operated under iAero Airways. iAero Group filed for Chapter 11 bankruptcy in September 2023, and iAero Airways ceased operations in April 2024. Jackson Jet purchased the FBO, Swift Aviation, at Phoenix Sky Harbor International Airport in January 2022. Jackson Jet Center purchased Swift Aviation's FBO assets at Phoenix Sky Harbor (KPHX) to bolster their presence in the Southwest.. Moyes is the controlling owner of SME Steel Contractors Inc., a steel erector company based in Utah, and Texas-based LTL freight carrier Central Freight Lines. He has invested in several Arizona sports teams, most notably the Arizona Coyotes, which he owned from 2006 until 2009.

== Personal life ==
Moyes is a graduate of Weber State College, where he attended the John B. Goddard School of Business & Economics. Moyes previously served as president of the Arizona Motor Transport Association.

Moyes and his wife, Vickie, have 10 children and 10 grandchildren.

In 2017, Moyes retired as CEO of Swift, becoming CEO emeritus and retaining a seat on the board of directors. Moyes continues to live a private life at his Glendale, Arizona estate

== Business ==
Moyes' father, Carl Moyes, initially worked for C.R. England as a trucker hauling produce in the farming community of Plain City, Utah. Carl would take what he learned from this job to create his own trucking company.

Moyes recalls that one day one of his father's clients came in to the company and explained that he did a majority of his business out of Phoenix and was looking for a new trucking company. The client wanted to use Moyes' company to move produce if he was to move down to Phoenix. Carl Moyes did not wish to move to Phoenix due to its climate, but offered his son and one of his trucks to allow Jerry to go and create his own trucking company, Common Market, in 1966. Moyes states that is "where it all got started."

The next year, Moyes bought another truck and began to grow his fleet and business, largely hauling steel imports from California to Arizona. His father joined him in Phoenix to drive the second truck and help in the business.

In 1972, Common Market merged with Swift Transportation, taking the latter's name and continuing to grow.

By 1990, the company was making around $250 million in revenue. Despite this large number, Moyes said that he was actually in debt at this time because he was so focused on growth, revenue would go right back into growing the company. That same year, Swift Transportation went public on the U.S. stock market, giving the company an extra $20 million. Following this, the company began acquiring numerous other trucking company such as East-West Transportation, Missouri-Nebraska Express, Navajo Shippers, MS Carriers, and Cardinal Freight to become the largest trucking company in the United States. By the turn of the century, Swift was a billion dollar company.

In 2017, Swift and Knight Transportation merged to become known as Knight-Swift. Knight-Swift Transportation is the seventh largest trucking company in the world with $7.5 billion in annual revenue providing hauling and logistics services in the U.S., Canada, and Mexico.

== Sports ventures ==
=== Arizona Coyotes ===
Moyes was a minority partner in Steve Ellman's ownership group, which bought the Coyotes from Richard Burke in 2001. On September 26, 2006, Ellman sold controlling interest in the Coyotes, Arizona Sting, and its lease of Jobing.com Arena to Moyes, who retained Wayne Gretzky as part-owner and head of hockey operations. In addition to his involvement with the Coyotes, Moyes, along with a group of investors, purchased the Arizona-based World Gym franchise and rebranded it as Coyotes Athletic Centers appointing Arizona native and businessman Darrin Austin as its CEO.

Court filings showed Moyes was never keen to own the Coyotes and had no interest in hockey. He acquired control of the club in 2006 after a falling out over a real estate development with former business partner Steve Ellman. Afterwards, Moyes tried to find a buyer for the Coyotes, and he chafed at the league's interference in his attempts. In 2008, Moyes told Gary Bettman and other league officials that he would stop funding the club. The league agreed to provide emergency funding in return for Moyes ceding his voting control. The acrimony was made public in May 2009 when Bettman and Daly came close to selling the Coyotes to Jerry Reinsdorf, owner of the Chicago Bulls and Chicago White Sox, a move that would have seen Moyes receive almost nothing from the sale. On May 5, 2009, Moyes put the Coyotes into Chapter 11 bankruptcy protection and announced a plan to sell the club to Jim Balsillie. Moyes also filed a lawsuit against the NHL, alleging the league was an "illegal cartel." Bettman was furious, arguing the league had been blindsided and that Moyes had no authority to put the club into bankruptcy protection.

Moyes was saddled with massive financial losses dating to the time the former Winnipeg Jets moved to Phoenix. Unable to turn around the team's fiscal picture, he agreed in principle to sell the Coyotes to a group headed by Research in Motion co-CEO Jim Balsillie, who intended to move the team to Hamilton, Ontario. The league responded by stripping Moyes of virtually all of his ownership authority, though he was still nominally the team's owner. The NHL argued that Moyes had no right to bankruptcy because numerous agreements he'd signed with the league in return for financial assistance specifically barred him from filing for bankruptcy. It also claimed that Moyes effectively surrendered control of the team by signing the agreements. Bankruptcy judge Redfield Baum scheduled a hearing for May 19, 2009, to determine who actually controlled the team. In October 2009, Baum rejected the NHL's bid, as well as Balsillie's $242.5-million offer. The judge ruled that Balsillie's bid faced too many legal obstacles, however, he said the NHL could revise its bid to include concessions to Moyes and Gretzky. The NHL had previously taken the position that neither Moyes nor Gretzky were legitimate creditors because they were owners. Under Chapter 11 proceedings, owners usually rank below other creditors and rarely receive any of the proceeds from asset sales. On November 2, 2009, Moyes sold the Coyotes to the NHL for $140 million.

=== Arizona Sting ===
Through Steve Ellman's investment firm, where Moyes was a business partner, Moyes was majority owner of the Arizona Sting of the National Lacrosse League. Moyes received full ownership in the 2006 deal that left Glendale Arena and its properties to him and looked to sell them the following year. He was unsuccessful in the sale of the team; the league would collapse in 2008.

=== Arizona Diamondbacks ===
In the mid-1990s, when Joe Garagiola Sr. was spearheading a group seeking an expansion franchise for Phoenix, Moyes put up $5 million to become a charter investor. He is a minority owner of the Diamondbacks, owning one-twenty-fourth of the team.

=== Phoenix Suns ===
After investing in the Arizona Diamondbacks, he met another owner of the team, Jerry Colangelo. Moyes began talking with Colangelo and bought a stake in his other Arizona sports team the Phoenix Suns, becoming minority owner.

=== Arizona Cardinals ===
In the early 2000s, when looking to move to their own stadium, Moyes (along with Steve Ellman) offered to buy 195 acres of land for what would become the University of Phoenix Stadium for the Arizona Cardinals. In this plan, he would donate 30 acres for the actual stadium and build the infrastructure around it including parking lots and youth sports fields. Moyes said that this plan meant that residents wouldn't have to "pay a dime." Ultimately, the city of Glendale chose to build the stadium through public funding.

== Political activity ==
Together with his spouse, Moyes contributed $101,000 to Donald Trump's 2020 presidential campaign.
