= Swift Transportation =

Former American transportation company

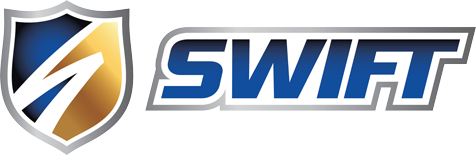
- Type: Subsidiary (historical)
- Traded as: NYSE: KNX
- Industry: Motor transportation; OTR trucking
- Founded: October 10, 1966
- Founder: Carl Moyes; Jerry Moyes
- Headquarters: Phoenix, Arizona, United States
- Key people: Adam W. Miller (President / CEO); Andrew Hess (CFO)
- Products: Truckload carrier
- Number of employees: 21,900 (2019)
- Parent: Knight-Swift
- Website: www.swifttrans.com

Previous logo

Swift Transportation was an American truckload shipping company based in Phoenix, Arizona. Founded in 1966, it operated as one of the largest over-the-road trucking carriers in the United States.

In 2017, Swift Transportation merged with Knight Transportation, also based in Phoenix, to form Knight-Swift Transportation Holdings. Following the merger, Swift ceased to exist as an independent company and became a brand and operating division within Knight-Swift.

== History ==
Carl Moyes was a truck driver hauling produce for C.R. England in the 1940s out of northern Utah. In the late 1950s Betty and Carl Moyes started a small trucking company in Plain City, Utah, B & C Truck Leasing. After their son, Jerry, graduated from Weber State University in 1966, they moved the small company to Phoenix, Arizona. Carl and his two sons, Ronald and Jerry (vice-president), formed the company Common Market in Arizona, that would become Swift.

Operations began in 1966 transporting imported steel from the ports of Los Angeles, California to Phoenix, Arizona, and returning with cotton from Arizona to be delivered to Southern California.

In 1970, in response to the Teamsters Strike, Swift Transportation, fired all its drivers, closed its doors in Gardena, CA and moved to Phoenix, AZ. Refusing to rehire a single driver. They stated that they would NEVER be a Union Shop. And they have held to that position.

The name Swift Transportation was purchased from a descendant of the Swift Meat Packing family, when the Moyes family bought the trucking assets of Swift & Company. The three Moyes family members and a fourth partner, Randy Knight, grew the business to $25 million in annual revenues by 1984. Jerry Moyes became president, chairman, and CEO that same year, and when Carl died in 1985, Jerry bought out the other two partners, his brother Ronald and Randy Knight. Ronald would continue to hold shares in Swift while Randy would become a co-founder of Knight Transportation.

In April 1988 Swift purchased Greenville, South Carolina-based Cooper Motor Lines from Philadelphia, Pennsylvania-based ARA Services.

By 1990, Swift Transportation had grown to a $125 million carrier with over 800 trucks. The company held an initial public offering (IPO) in 1990 and became a publicly traded entity on the NASDAQ market system under the symbol SWFT.

In 1991, with money raised in the IPO, Swift bought Stephens City, Virginia-based Arthur H. Fulton Inc. for $9 million out of Chapter 11 bankruptcy.

In a similar move, in 2001 Moyes purchased the assets of Dick Simon Trucking, which had filed for Chapter 11 bankruptcy. Those assets were rolled into Moyes's small Central Freight Lines out of Texas, and later spun off as the separate entity Central Refrigerated Service, which remained wholly owned by Moyes until its subsequent sale to and merger with Swift. That sale was announced in summer 2013, and the merger completed on February 1, 2014. Moyes received $180 million in cash for the sale.

The company's growth continued since 1988 with the purchase of eleven motor carriers throughout the United States, including M.S. Carriers, of Memphis, Tennessee in 2001. The shareholders of M.S. Carriers obtained a 22% stake in the combined company.

Moyes was soon to retire when he was forced out as chief executive officer (CEO) at Swift in October 2005 after a United States Securities and Exchange Commission (SEC) investigation into insider trading. Without admitting or denying wrongdoing he paid a $1.26 million settlement. The Moyes family still controlled about 39% of the public stock.

In November 2006 Moyes offered to buy Swift for $29 a share. The offer was raised to $2.4 billion ($31.55 per share) for shares not controlled by the family and assumption of $332 million in outstanding debt. The transaction closed on May 10, 2007. To finance the acquisition, Moyes formed Saint Acquisition Corporation, and issued $2.1 billion of a senior secured credit facility and $835 million in second-lien senior secured notes. The company's drivers and eighty-three percent of outstanding shares (approximately half of those controlled by the family) supported the buyout.

Swift’s terminal network grew to over forty full service facilities in the continental United States and Mexico before contracting during the Great Recession. The total number of employees dropped from 21,900, to approximately 17,700. Swift owns 100% of Trans-Mex, a Nuevo Laredo, Mexico-based carrier. Swift offers border crossing services at all major Mexican border crossings. Swift maintains a presence in every Canadian Province.

The company operated 16,200 units (12,300 tractors by company drivers and 3,900 owner-operator tractors), a fleet of 48,600 trailers, and 4,500 intermodal containers from 35 terminals in the United States and Mexico, generating just over $2.5 billion in revenue for the year ended December 31, 2009.

Swift Transportation became public again on December 16, 2010, trading on the New York Stock Exchange (NYSE). The company offered 73,300,000 shares at $11.00 per share, raising almost $766 million, with the proceeds used for debt reduction. The offering represented 54.9% of the company, valuing the company at $1.86 billion. Due to the economic downturn, the IPO was below Moyes leveraged-buyout (LBO) price of $17.61. With the offering the name changed from Swift Holdings Corp. to Swift Transportation Company.

In April 2017, Swift Transportation merged with Knight Transportation in a $6 billion deal.

In July 2024, Knight-Swift acquired Dependable Highway Express, Inc., a LTL carrier out of Los Angeles.

=== Company trucks ===
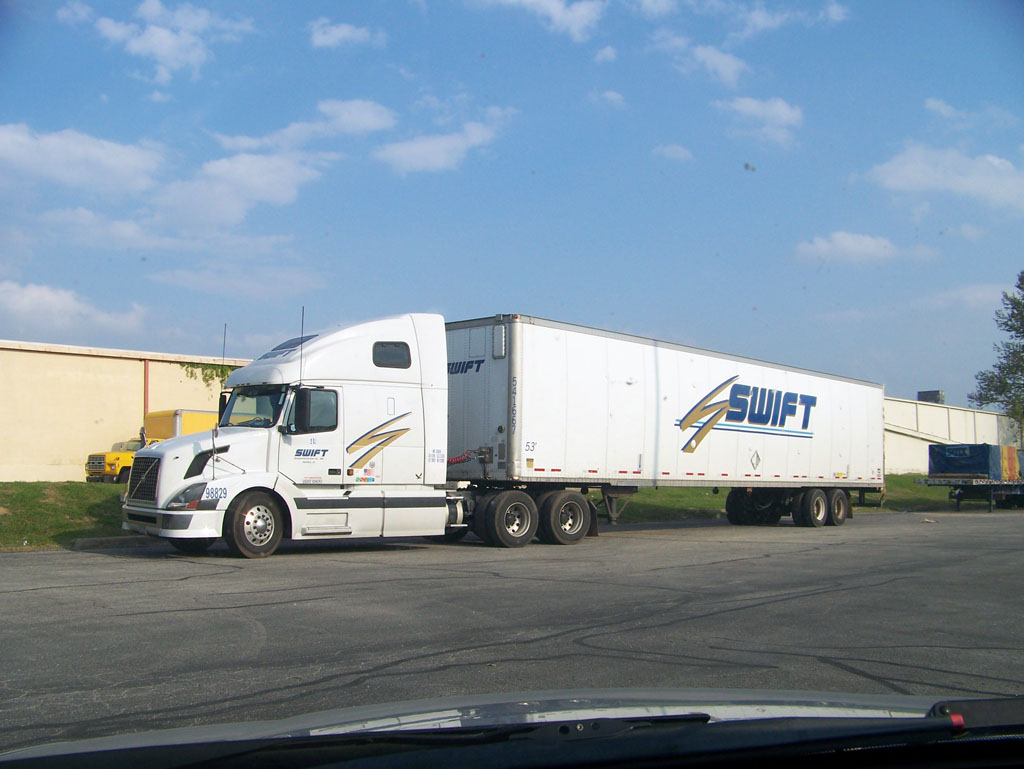
2006 Volvo VNL670 with a 2002 Wabash National 53' DuraPlate Dry Van Trailer

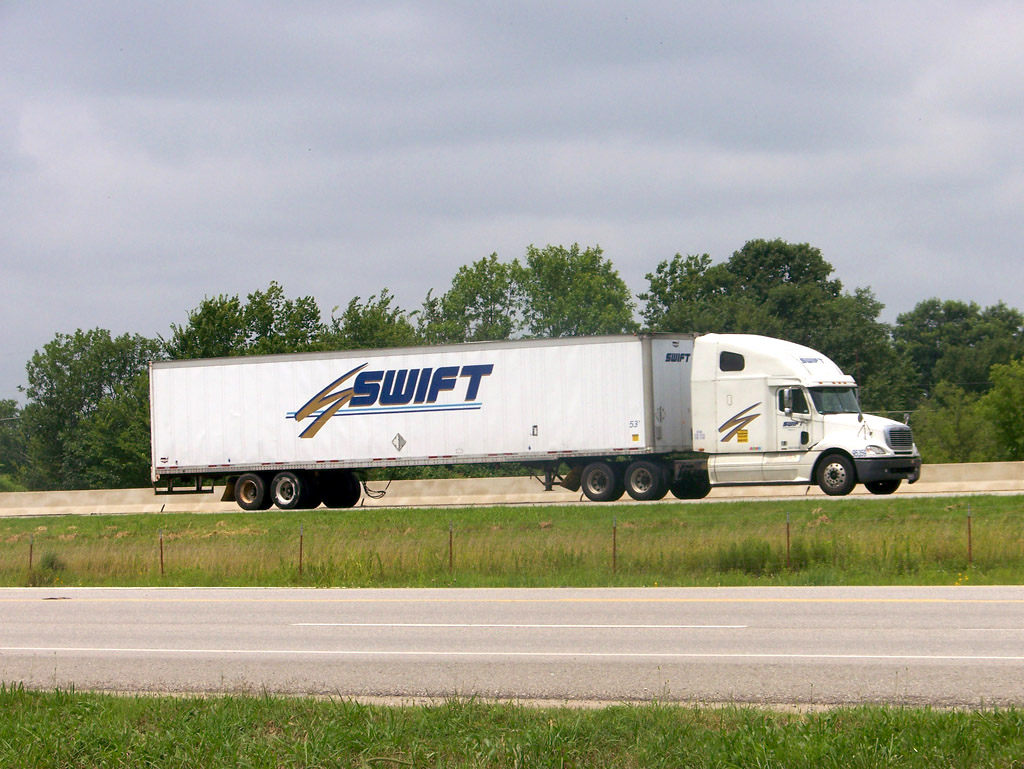
2005 Freightliner Columbia with a 1996 Wabash National 53' Sheet & Post Dry Van Trailer

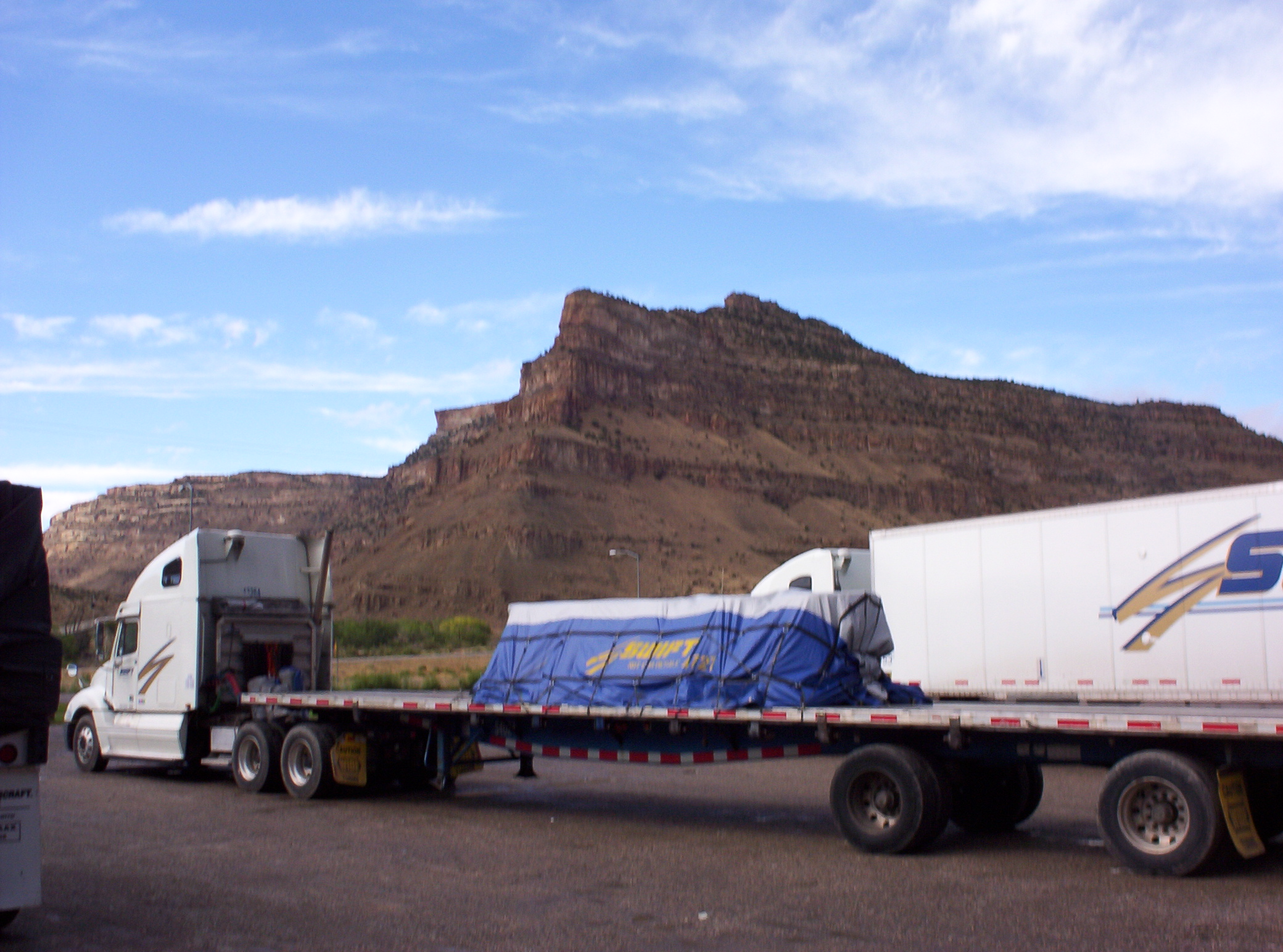
Freightliner Columbia with Flatbed Spread Axle trailer

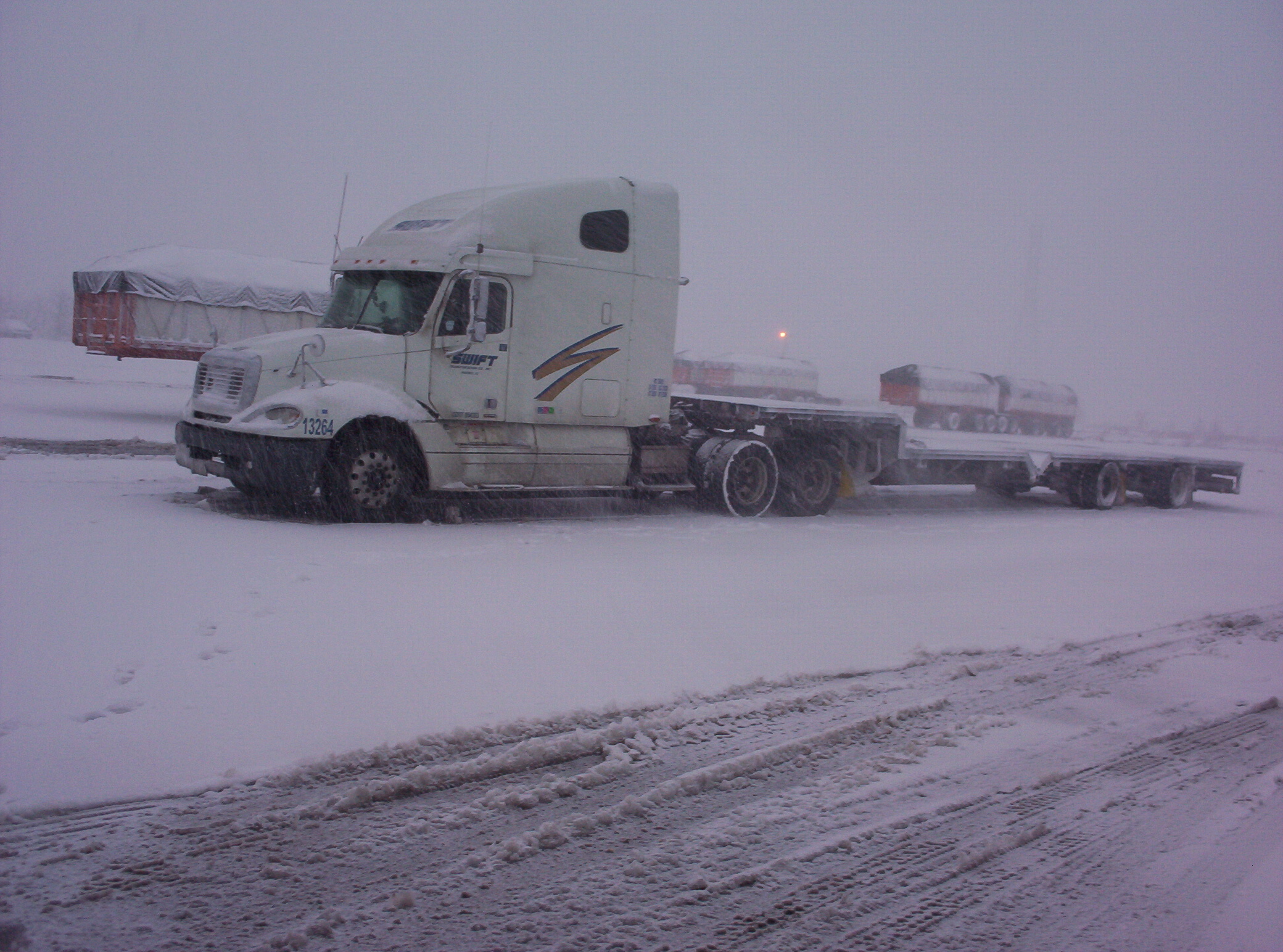
Freightliner Columbia with single drop flatbed (also known as a stepdeck) trailer
