= History of the trucking industry in the United States =

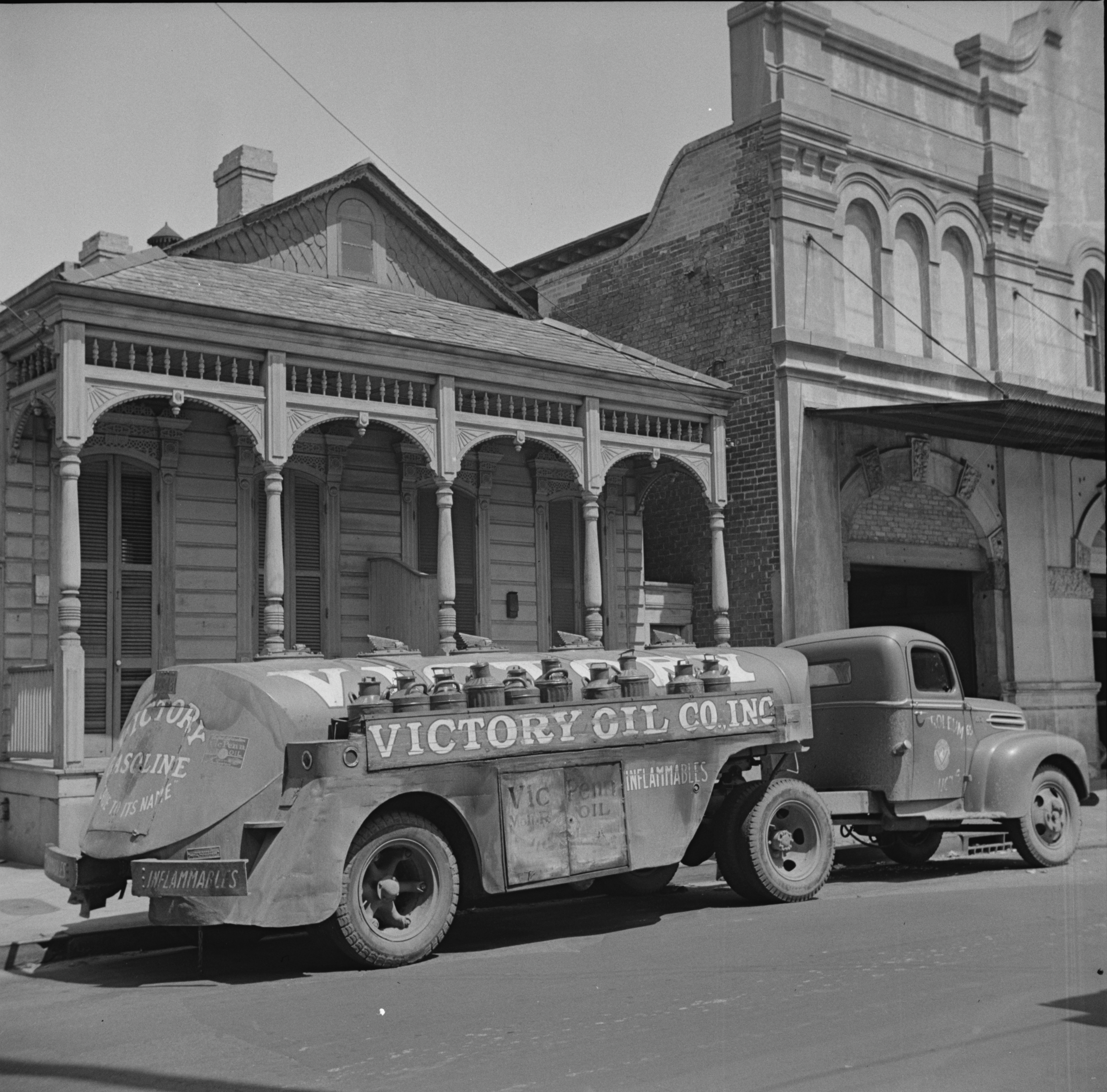
A Victory Oil semi-trailer truck from 1943

The trucking industry in the United States has affected the political and economic history of the United States in the 20th century. Before the invention of automobiles, most freight was moved by train or horse-drawn vehicle.

During World War I, the military was the first to use trucks extensively. With the increased construction of paved roads, trucking began to achieve significant foothold in the 1930s, and soon became subject to various government regulations (such as hours of service). During the late 1950s and 1960s, trucking was accelerated by the construction of the Interstate Highway System, an extensive network of highways linking major cities across the continent.

Trucking achieved national attention during the 1960s and 70s, when songs and movies about truck driving were major hits. Truck drivers participated in widespread strikes against the rising cost of fuel, during the energy crises of 1973 and 1979, and the industry was drastically deregulated by the Motor Carrier Act of 1980. Trucking has come to dominate the freight industry in the latter portion of the 20th Century, along with what are termed "big-box stores" such as Walmart and Target.

== 19th century ==
Before 1900, most freight transported over land was carried by trains using railroads. Trains were highly efficient at moving large amounts of freight, but could only deliver that freight to centralized urban centers for distribution by horse-drawn transport. The few trucks that existed at the time were mostly novelties, appreciated more for their advertising space than for their utility. Winton Motor Carriage Company built one of the first trailer trucks, converting a car into a tractor and made a small trailer to move cars from its factory in 1899. Ten years later Fruehauf experimented with tractor trailers. The use of range-limited electric engines, lack of paved rural roads, and small load capacities limited trucks to mostly short-haul urban routes.

== 20th century ==
Starting in 1910, the development of a number of technologies gave rise to the modern trucking industry. With the advent of the gasoline-powered internal combustion engine, improvements in transmissions, the move away from chain drives to gear drives, and the development of the tractor/semi-trailer combination, shipping by truck gained in popularity. In 1913, the first state weight limits for trucks were introduced. Only four states limited truck weights, from a low of 18,000 pounds (8,200 kg) in Maine to a high of 28,000 pounds (13,000 kg) in Massachusetts. These laws were enacted to protect the earth and gravel-surfaced roads from damage caused by the iron and solid rubber wheels of early trucks. By 1914 there were almost 100,000 trucks on America's roads. However, solid tires, poor rural roads, and a maximum speed of 15 miles per hour (24 km/h) continued to limit the use of these trucks to mainly urban areas.

=== World War I ===
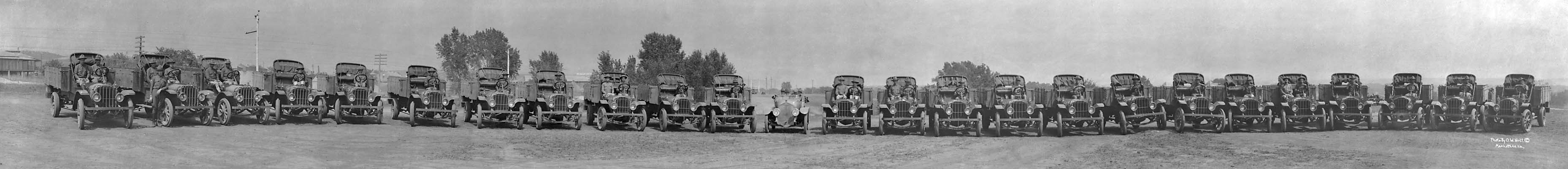
World War I trucks circa 1917, manufactured by White Motor Company

The years of World War I (1914–18) spurred rising truck use and development. During the busy war years, the increased congestion of railroads exposed the need for alternative modes of transporting cargo. It was during these years when Roy Chapin (working with a military committee) began to experiment with the first long-distance truck shipments, and pneumatic (inflated) tires capable of supporting heavier loads were developed which enabled trucks to drive at higher speeds. Two truck manufacturers that emerged during this time were a former sewing machine maker, White (pictured above), and one that would become a modern euphemism for "truck," Mack. By 1920 there were over a million trucks on America's roads.

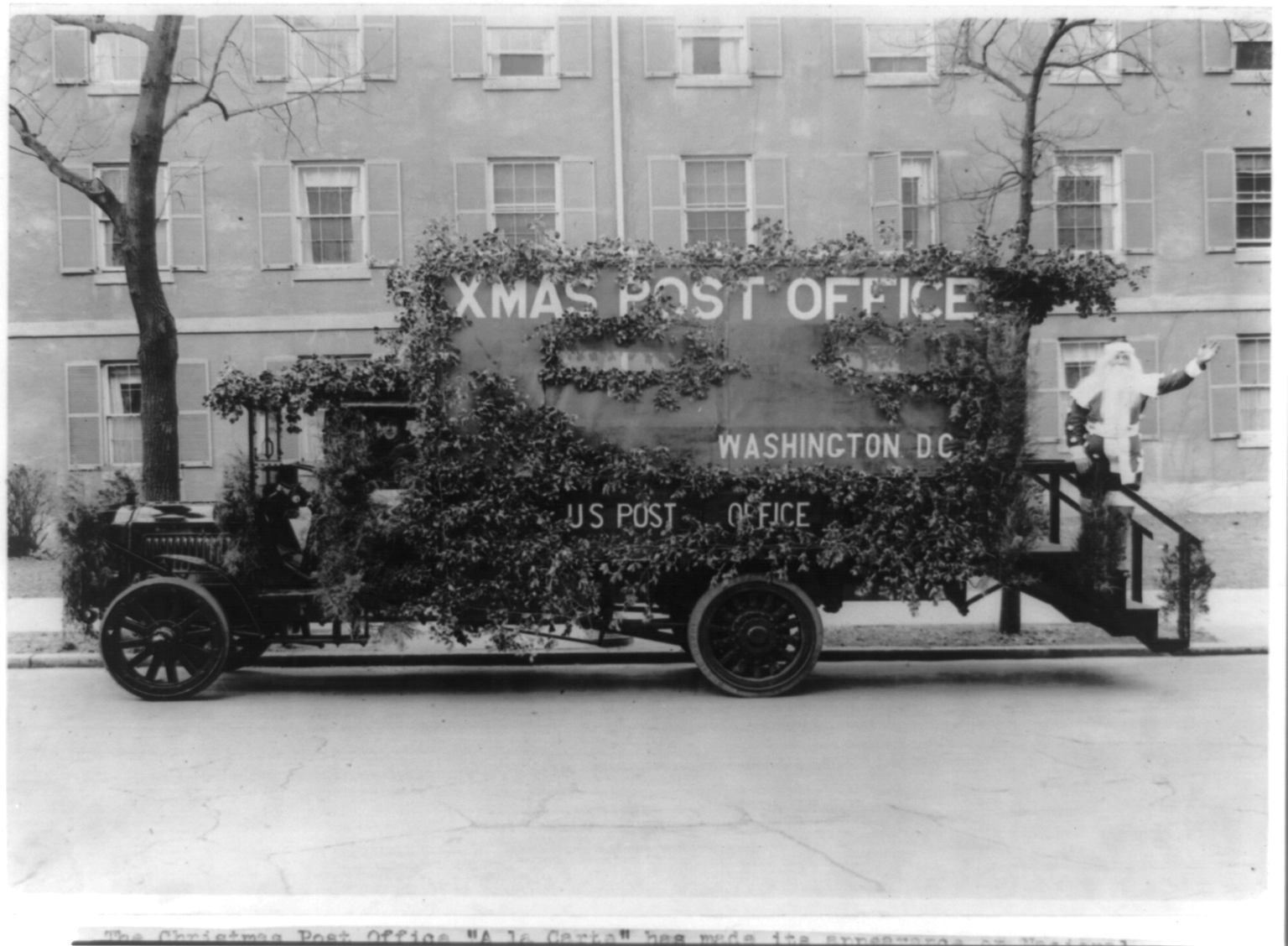
A U.S. Post Office truck decorated for the 1921 Christmas season

The years beyond 1920 saw several advancements, such as improved rural roads, the introduction of the diesel engine (which are 25–40% more efficient than gasoline engines), the standardization of truck and trailer sizes along with fifth wheel coupling systems, as well as power assisted brakes and steering. By 1933, all states had some form of varying truck weight regulation.

=== New Deal ===
In 1933, as a part of President Franklin D. Roosevelt’s “New Deal”, the National Recovery Administration requested that each industry create a “code of fair competition”. The American Highway Freight Association and the Federated Trucking Associations of America met in the spring of 1933 to speak for the trucking association and begin discussing a code. By summer of 1933 the code of competition was completed and ready for approval. The two organizations had also merged to form the American Trucking Associations. The code was approved on February 10, 1934. On May 21, 1934, the first president of the ATA, Ted Rogers, became the first truck operator to sign the code. A special "Blue Eagle" license plate was created for truck operators to indicate compliance with the code.

In 1935, congress passed the Motor Carrier Act, which replaced the code of competition and authorized the Interstate Commerce Commission (ICC) to regulate the trucking industry.

In September 1938, a truckers strike began in New York City and shut down the city for weeks, demanding lower hours, as one of the biggest strikes that year.

Based on recommendations the ICC issued, in July 1938, which were modified after pressure from labor groups. The first hours of service regulations were enacted in October 1938, limiting the driving hours of truck and bus drivers. In 1941, the now abolished ICC reported that inconsistent weight limitations imposed by the states were a hindrance to effective interstate truck commerce.

=== Creation of interstates ===
In 1941, President Roosevelt appointed a special committee to explore the pay idea of a "national inter-regional highway" system, but the committee's progress was halted by the initiation of World War II. After the war was over, the Federal-Aid Highway Act of 1944 authorized the designation of what are now termed "Interstate Highways", but did not include a funding program to build the highways. Limited progress was made until President Dwight D. Eisenhower renewed interest in the plan in 1954. This began a long, bitter debate between various interests such as rail, truck, tire, oil, and farm groups, over who would pay for the new highways and how.

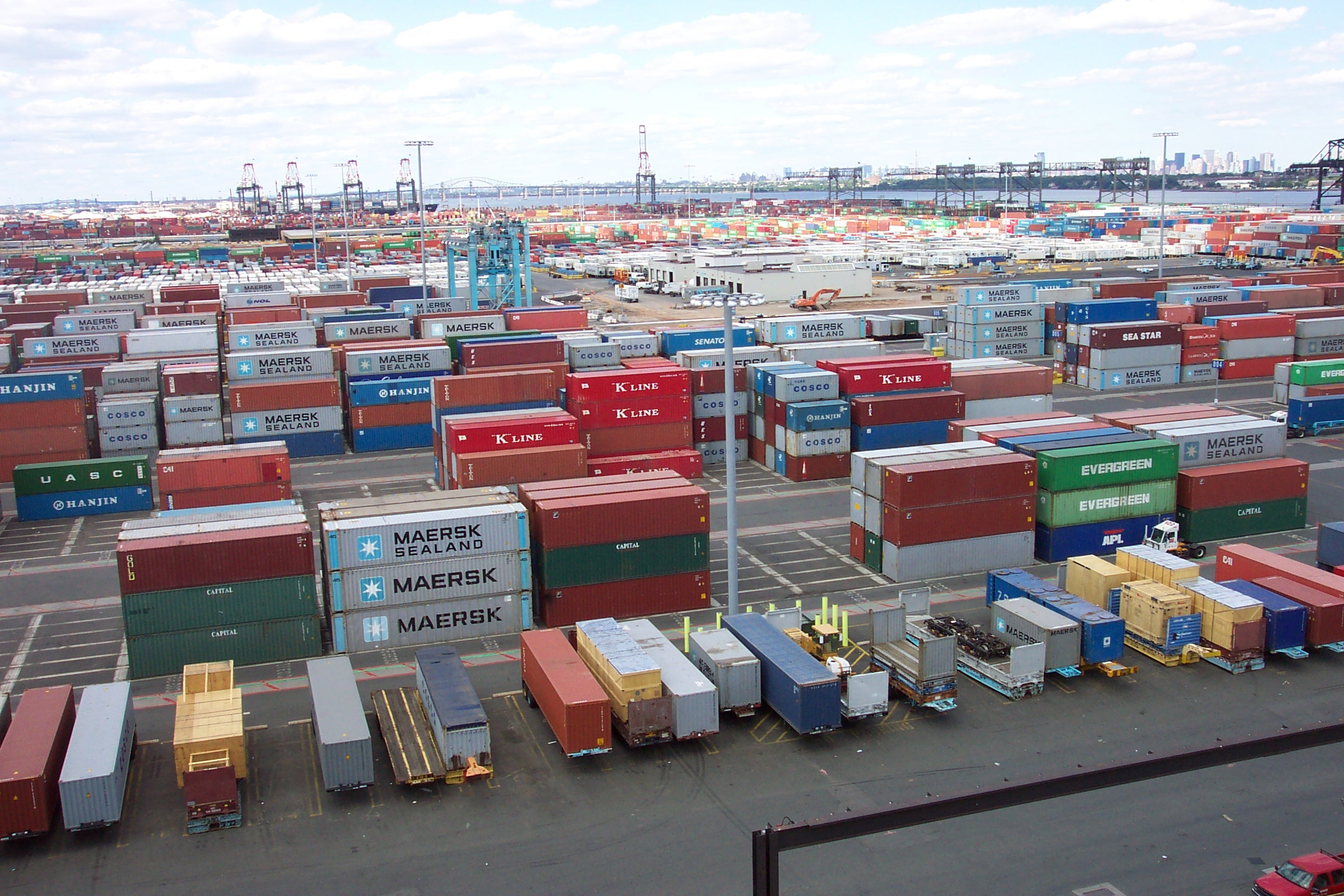
Intermodal containers waiting to be transferred between ships, trains, and trucks are stacked in holding areas at a shipping port.

After compromises had been made, the Federal-Aid Highway Act of 1956 authorized the construction of the Interstate Highway System, an interconnected network of controlled-access freeways that allowed larger trucks to travel at higher speeds through rural and urban areas. This act also authorized the first federal maximum gross vehicle weight limits for trucks, set at 73,280 pounds (33,240 kg). In that same year, modern containerized intermodal shipping was pioneered by Malcom McLean, allowing for more efficient transfer of cargo between trucks, trains, and ships.

In the late 1950s, the American Association of State Highway and Transportation Officials (AASHTO) conducted a series of extensive field tests of roads and bridges to determine how traffic contributed to the deterioration of pavement materials. These tests led to a 1964 recommendation by the AASHTO (to Congress) that the gross weight limit for trucks should be determined by a bridge formula table based on axle lengths, instead of a static upper limit. By 1970 there were over 18 million trucks on America's roads.

=== 1970s ===
The Federal-Aid Highway Amendments of 1974 established a federal maximum gross vehicle weight of 80,000 pounds (36,000 kg), and introduced a sliding scale of truck weight-to-length ratios based on the bridge formula, but did not establish a federal minimum weight limit. Consequently, six contiguous states in the Mississippi Valley (which came to be known as the “barrier states”) refused to increase their Interstate weight limits to 80,000 pounds, and the trucking industry effectively faced a barrier to efficient cross-country interstate commerce.

The decade of the 70s saw the heyday of truck driving, and the dramatic rise in the popularity of "trucker culture". Truck drivers were romanticized as modern-day cowboys and outlaws (and this stereotype persists even today). This was due in part to their use of citizens' band (CB) radio to relay information to each other regarding the locations of police officers and transportation authorities. Plaid shirts, trucker hats, CB radios, and using CB slang were popular not just with drivers but among the general public.

In 1976, the number one hit on the Billboard chart was "Convoy," a novelty song by C.W. McCall about a convoy of truck drivers evading speed traps and toll booths across America. The song inspired the 1978 action film Convoy directed by Sam Peckinpah. After the film's release, thousands of independent truck drivers went on strike and participated in violent protests during the 1979 energy crisis (although similar strikes had occurred during the 1973 energy crisis).

The year 1977 saw the release of Smokey and the Bandit, the third-highest-grossing film of that year, beaten only by Star Wars Episode IV and Close Encounters of the Third Kind. During that same year, CB Bears saw its debut; a Saturday morning cartoon featuring mystery-solving bears who communicate by CB radio. By the start of the 80s the trucking phenomenon had waned, and with the rise of cellular phone technology, the CB radio was no longer popular with passenger vehicles (although truck drivers still use it today).

=== Deregulation ===
The Motor Carrier Act of 1980 partially deregulated the trucking industry, dramatically increasing the number of trucking companies in operation. The ensuing expansion of the trucking workforce depressed wages and job popularity. However, deregulation increased the competition and productivity within the trucking industry as whole, and reduced prices for the American consumer. The Surface Transportation Assistance Act of 1982 established a federal minimum for truck weight limits, which finally standardized truck size and weight limits across the country for traffic on the Interstate Highways (resolving the issue of the "barrier states").

== 21st century ==
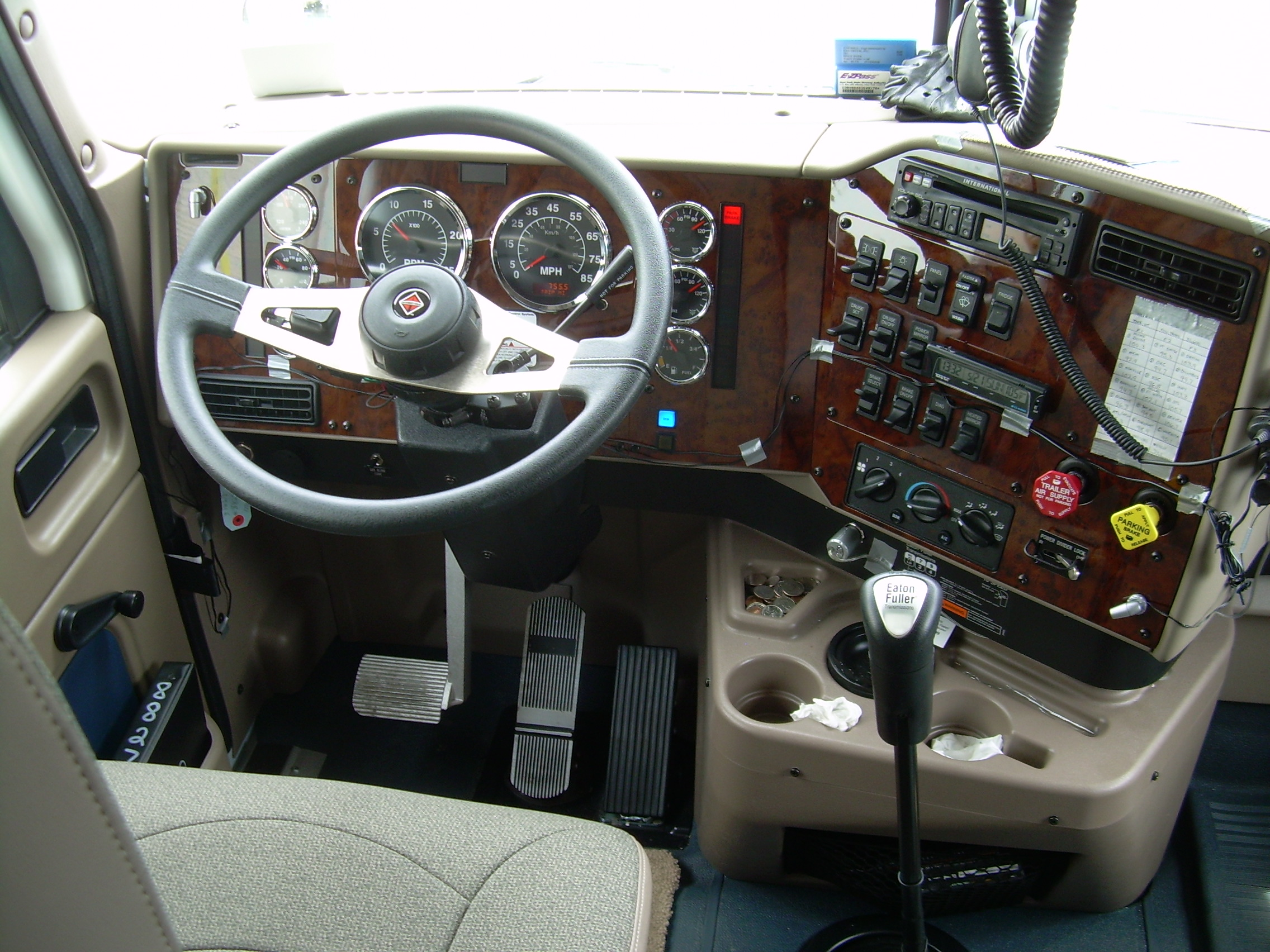
Interior of a modern truck cab.

By 2006 there were over 26 million trucks on America's roads, hauling over 10 billion short tons (9.1 billion long tons), representing nearly 70% of the total volume of freight. Many automobile drivers are largely unfamiliar with large trucks and many accidents are the result of these drivers being unaware of an 18-wheeler's numerous and large blind spots. The Occupational Safety and Health Administration has determined that 70% of fatal automobile/tractor-trailer accidents were the result of "unsafe actions of automobile drivers".

In 2007, the Women In Trucking Association, Inc was founded by trucker Ellen Voie. Its remit is to provide technical and logistical support to women who are already a part of the industry or have an interest in it.

In the 2009 book, Trucking country: The road to America's Walmart economy, author Shane Hamilton explores the history of trucking and how developments in the trucking industry helped the so-called big-box stores (such as Walmart or Target) dominate the retail sector of the U.S. economy.

== See also ==
- Michael H. Belzer author of Sweatshops on Wheels.
