= American Trucking Associations =

Federation of trucking industry groups

- Founded: 1933
- Type: Trade association
- Purpose: Trucking Industry
- Location: Washington, D.C.
- Region served: United States
- Key people: Chris Spear, president and CEO David Manning, Chairman and President of TCW, Inc., Nashville, Tennessee.
- Website: trucking.org

The American Trucking Associations (ATA), founded in 1933, is the largest national trade association for the trucking industry. ATA represents more than 37,000 members covering every type of motor carrier in the United States through a federation of other trucking groups, industry-related conferences, and its 50 affiliated state trucking associations. Former Governor of Kansas Bill Graves was replaced by Chris Spear as the ATA's president and CEO in July 2016.

According to its website the ATA's mission is to "develop, advocate, and advance innovative research-based policies that promote highway safety, security, environmental sustainability and profitability."

== History ==
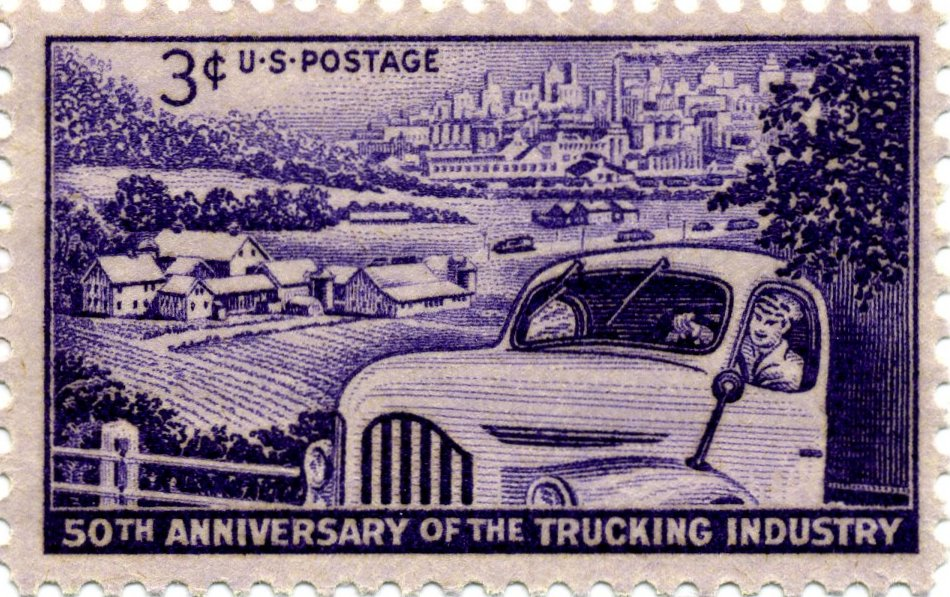
50th anniversary of American Trucking Industry commemorated on 1953 U.S. postage stamp

On September 23, 1933, the American Trucking Associations was established as a national affiliation of state trucking organizations. The ATA was established by a merger of the American Highway Freight Association and the Federated Trucking Associations of America.

The ATA began with a staff of eight working from a three-room suite in the Transportation Building in Washington, D.C. During World War II the Army requested that ATA recruit personnel for two quartermaster regiments to constitute the U.S.Army Transportation Corps. With calls to the 350 members of the ATA's Trucking Service War Council, 5,700 trucking industry employees volunteered for enlisted positions and 258 volunteered for officer commissions. After the war the ATA was in the forefront of the groups and industries supporting Dwight D. Eisenhower's Interstate Highway System.

The American Trucking Association has worked on regulatory issues from the Code of Fair Competition in 1934 to the eventual deregulation of the industry.

The ATA's headquarters are in Washington, D.C.. The ATA has a legislative affairs office on Capitol Hill in Washington, D.C.

In 2016, ATA named Chris Spear as the federation's ninth president, replacing former Kansas Governor Bill Graves.

== Organization ==
ATA is the trade association representing its members before Congress, the executive branch, the courts, and the regulatory agencies. It includes 50 state trucking associations, two conferences and three councils. Each state association is an independent organization with its own membership, dues structure, officers, budgets and staff, but having representation and voting powers within the federation. Like the state associations, ATA's conferences (each representing a segment of the industry) are autonomous organizations.

ATA is composed of motor carrier members and is governed by a board of elected carrier representative members. A smaller executive committee is composed of elected members that set policies and priorities. Allied members, representing suppliers to the trucking industry, also have representation within the organization. All ATA members are provided access to experts in safety, engineering, law, finance, communications, information and logistics technology, regulatory and legislative affairs, and a number of other areas of service to the trucking industry.

As members of the federation, ATA's councils are dedicated to continuing education and policy in specific trucking disciplines including safety management, maintenance, accounting and finance, information technology, logistics, and more.

== Policies ==
The ATA's messages revolve around three core areas: the essentiality of the trucking industry to the economy; the industry's ongoing efforts and progress made to improve highway safety; and the industry's commitment to reducing emissions and carbon output.

=== Essentiality ===
ATA advocates the essentiality of the trucking industry in the U.S. economy. Trucks haul nearly 100 percent of consumer goods and more than 70 percent of all freight tonnage in the United States. Moreover, economists estimate that 80 percent of U.S. communities receive their goods exclusively by truck.

Economists expect the U.S. population to grow by 27 million in the next 10 years, and overall freight tonnage to increase 26 percent by 2021, with the modal share hauled by truck increasing to 71 percent. To keep pace with this growth, ATA advocates increasing capacity and improving highway infrastructure at the nation's worst traffic congestion points to ensure the efficient movement of goods.

=== Safety ===
ATA's safety message focuses on three different key areas: improving driver performance, safer vehicles, and safer motor carriers. The ATA maintains that the trucking industry is safer than it has ever been, according to truck vehicle miles traveled (VMT) figures from the Federal Highway Administration (FHWA), and National Highway Traffic Safety Administration (NHTSA) data on crashes. Since new Hours-of-Service regulations took effect in 2004, the truck-involved fatality rate has come down more than 20 percent and is at its lowest since the U.S. Department of Transportation began keeping those records in 1975. The fatality rate has declined more than 66 percent since 1975. The trucking industry has also seen an increase in safety belt usage.

In 2008, ATA released a progressive 18-point safety agenda to help further improve highway safety. ATA recommends the following in order to increase safety through improving driver performance: uniform commercial driver's license (CDL) testing standards, additional parking facilities for trucks, a national maximum speed limit of 65 mph, strategies to increase use of safety belts, increased use of red light cameras, and more stringent laws to reduce drinking and driving. In order to make vehicles safer the ATA supports: targeted electronic speed governing of certain non-commercial vehicles, electronic speed governing of all large trucks, and new large truck crashworthiness standards. Finally, the ATA promotes making motor carriers safer through: a national employer notification system, a national clearinghouse for positive drug and alcohol test results of CDL holders, and required safety training by new entrant motor carriers.

=== Sustainability ===
SmartWay Logo

ATA supports environmental sustainability policies that provide the trucking industry with realistic ways of reducing greenhouse gas emissions without impeding the freedom of movement essential to the U.S. economy. ATA has six recommendations to reduce carbon emissions in the trucking industry: enacting a national 65 mph speed limit and governing truck speeds to 65 mph or lower, decreasing idling, increasing fuel efficiency, reducing congestion through highway improvements, promoting the use of more productive truck combinations, and through supporting national fuel economy standards for medium- and heavy-duty trucks. These proposals together can reduce diesel and gasoline fuel consumption by 86 billion US gallons (330,000,000 m^{3}) and CO_{2} emissions of all vehicles by nearly a billion tons over the next decade.

Also, ATA recommends that shippers and carriers join the Environmental Protection Agency's (EPA) SmartWay Transport Partnership Program. In 2009 ATA was awarded the SmartWay Excellence Award. By 2012, the SmartWay Transport Partnership will cut carbon dioxide (CO_{2}) emissions by 33 to 66 million metric tons per year.

=== Strategic plan ===
The ATA has instituted a five step plan to meet the above goals:

- Encouraging the trucking industry to prioritize safety
- Continually increasing efficiency and productivity
- Branding ATA as the authoritative voice for the industry
- Providing solid leadership in the industry
- Maximizing human and financial resources to achieve the above mission

== Subsidiaries, conferences and councils ==
- Transport Topics is the national weekly business publication published by Transport Topics Publishing Group covering trucking and freight transportation news. It is owned by ATA and has been published since 1935. According to the Audit Bureau of Circulations, the publication had a paid circulation of approximately 30,000 in May 2007. Its readers consist mainly of executives and managers involved in trucking, logistics and freight transportation.
- The American Transportation Research Institute (ATRI)- According to its website ATRI "and its predecessor organization the ATA Foundation have been engaged in critical transportation studies and operational tests since 1954. ATRI's primary mission is to conduct research in the field of transportation, with an emphasis on the trucking industry's essential role in a safe, efficient, and viable transportation system".

=== Conferences ===
ATA Conferences bring together groups of member motor carriers and suppliers in a specific line of business. Conferences are open to all ATA members and have policymaking and advocacy authority in their operational areas.

- The Automobile Carriers Conference covers issues related to the transportation of automobiles and trucks for manufacturers, dealers and consumers.
- The Agricultural and Food Transporters Conference is concerned with the transporters of food, timber, natural resources, farm commodities and supplies, both for-hire and private.
- The Intermodal Motor Carriers Conference represents trucking operations at ports the handling of intermodal containers.

=== Councils ===
- National Accounting and Finance Council– A council for carrier CFOs and managers in federal and state tax compliance, financial management, accounting, insurance, and risk management.
- Information Technology & Logistics Council– A council for today's IT, logistics and operations professionals.
- Safety Management Council– A council for industry practitioners in safety, workplace injury prevention, human resources and employee health.
- Transportation Security Council - A council for home to carrier personnel in cargo theft, Homeland Security, background check, freight claims, and security regulatory compliance.
- Technology & Maintenance Council- A council for trucking experts in equipment maintenance and specifications, purchasing and on-board truck technologies.

== Driver of the Year ==
The ATA National Driver of the Year Award recognizes one professional truck driver for his/her exemplary accomplishments and excellent driving attributes. Contestants for the ATA award start out by winning at the company level and are nominated by state trucking associations.

At the national level, the Driver of the Year Award is presented to a driver whose professional qualifications, experience and performance are noteworthy. A driver may be nominated for an outstanding deed of heroism or highway courtesy; an outstanding contribution to highway safety, and/or a long record of safe and courteous driving - or a combination of part or all of these. An impartial panel of judges from the trucking industry, government and law enforcement chooses the winner.

The honor is considered among the highest a commercial truck driver can receive. As the ATA National Driver of the Year, the winner receives a cash prize, trophy and diamond lapel pin at the ATA Annual Awards Banquet.

Past ATA National Driver of the Year Award Winners are:

Year	Driver's Name	Company	State
1948	Verle Langford	Eveready Truck Service	Colorado
1949	Martin Larsen	Indianhead Truck Lines	Minnesota
1950	Lloyd Reisner	Hancock Truck Lines	Indiana
1951	John Castner	Pierce Auto Freight Lines, Inc.	Oregon
1952	Allen C. Sagerhorn	Consolidated Freightways, Inc.	Oregon
1953	Pat Burkholder	Garrett Freight Lines	Nevada
1954	Gomer W. Bailey	Buckingham Transportation, Inc.	Colorado
1955	Floyd J. Pemberton	Commercial Carriers, Inc.	Michigan
1956	Lewis E. Cook	Reed's Transfer & Storage Co.	Iowa
1957	Ernest Roedel	Freight Ways, Inc.	Missouri
1958	Reuben C. Thomas	Sessions Company, Inc.	Alabama
1959	Carl C. Crim	Hugh Breeding, Inc.	Oklahoma
1960	Russell L. Brown	American Petrofina Co.	Texas
1961	Melvin O. Griffith	Eagle Transport Co.	Texas
1962	Arthur M. Lear	St. Johnsbury Trucking Co.	Maine
1963	Wm. C. Nunley	Yellow Transit Freight Lines	Oklahoma
1964	Woodrow W. Given	Service Lines, Inc.	Tennessee
1965	Russell L. Beaulieu	Branch Motor Express Co.	Rhode Island
1966	Donald Beaudette	Land O’Lakes Creameries, Inc.	Minnesota
1967	James A. Martin	B & L Motor Freight	Ohio
1968	Wray Mundy	D C International	Colorado
1969	Frederick Marsh	Watt Transport, Inc.	Rhode Island
1970	Frank DeLucia	Adley Express Co.	Connecticut
1971	W.T. “Shorty” Smith	Central Freight Lines, Inc.	Texas
1972	Clarence Hoffman	Raymond Motor Trans. Company	Minnesota
1973	Curtis C. Stapp	System 99	California
1974	Wilbur “Bill” Moore	Pacific Intermountain Express Co.	New Mexico
1975	Calvin W. Lane	Coors Transportation Co.	Colorado
1976	Harry R. Thomas	Robertson Truck-A-Ways, Inc.	California
1977	Olen Lee Welk	C&H Transportation Co., Inc.	Dallas, Texas/Missouri
1978	William M. Whim	Mid-American Lines, Inc.	Kansas
1979	Frank M. Waldron	C&H Transportation Co., Inc.	Arizona
1980	Malvin B. Mathews	Complete Auto Transit	Georgia
1981	Kenneth W. Olson	Murphy Motor Freight Lines	Minnesota
1982	William G. Yates	Hobart Corporation	Ohio
1983	Arthur E. Schooley	Jack Cooper Transport	Missouri
1984	N.F. Plunkett Jr.	Chevron USA	Alabama
1985	John Chamberlain	Giant Food	Washington D.C.
1986	Davis C. Wrich	MacMillan Bloedel Bldg. Materials	Maryland
1987	Jack Wilhite	Liquid Transport, Inc.	Indiana
1988	Louis E. Mora	Sierra Pacific Power Co.	Nevada
1989	Charles K. Thompson	Neal Oil Co. (APC)	South Carolina
1990	Alan J. Koole	Steelcase, Inc.	Michigan
1991	John D. Porter	Con-Way Central Express	Ohio
1992	Jerry Pitra	Super Valu Stores, Inc.	Minnesota
1993	David P. Maphis	Hadley Auto Transport Co.	California
1994	LaVant Bean	Anderson Trucking Service	Minnesota
1995	Floyd R. Buffington	CF Motor Freight	Illinois
1996	David G. McDonald	Roadway Express	Kansas
1997	Harold Likins Jr.	Farmland Industries	Kansas
1998	James E. Sheriff	Roadway Express	Illinois
1999	Thomas W. Hawks	Overnite Transportation Company	Tennessee
2000	William Whim	ABF Freight System, Inc.	Kansas
2001	Steven Williams	Nobel Sysco	Colorado
2002	Kevin Scott Harris	ABF Freight System, Inc.	New York
2003	Doris Hansen	Quality Transportation, Inc.	Montana
2004	Charles Brown	Yellow Transportation, Inc.	Kansas
2005	Larry Springer	Central Freight Lines	Texas
2006	James Wilcox	Yellow Transportation, Inc.	New Mexico
2007	William Gray Jr.	UPS Freight	Maryland
2008	David J. May	Con-way Freight	New York
2009	Keith Suits	Rite Aid Rome Distribution Center	New York
2010	Anthony A. Jones	Central Freight Lines	Texas
2011	Dalton “Rickey” Oliver	Walmart Transportation LLC	Mississippi
2012	Ronald Fuller	Central Freight Lines	Texas
2013	Gary Babbitt	Central Freight Lines	Texas
2014	Carl Schultz	Davis Express	Florida
2015	James Hylan Grise	Walmart Transportation LLC	Kentucky
2016	Frank Calvert	AAA Cooper Transportation	Alabama
2017	Gary Plant	Walmart Transportation LLC	Colorado

== Technology & Maintenance Council ==
The Technology & Maintenance Council (TMC) creates standards for engineering and maintenance practices.

For example, Recommended Practice RP 243 tells tire manufactures how to use yellow and red dots on tire rims to let installers know the balance points of the tire.

== Litigation ==
In 2013, the Supreme Court of the United States held in American Trucking Ass'ns, Inc. v. City of Los Angeles that certain environmental requirements imposed by a city were preempted by federal law.
