= Women In Trucking Association, Inc =

American non-profit organization

Women In Trucking Association, Inc. (WIT) is an American non-profit organization which focuses on the employment of women in the trucking industry and addresses obstacles that might keep women from entering or succeeding in the trucking industry. It was founded by Ellen Voie in 2007. Jennifer Hedrick was named the CEO after Ellen Voie. The organization focuses mainly on women who are already a part of the industry or have an interest in it and works as a support network with 5,500 members in which 600 are drivers and others are corporations. WIT headquarters are located in Plover, Wisconsin, United States.

== History ==
Ellen Voie founded the Women In Trucking Association in 2007. She is the holder of a commercial driver's license and has been advocating for the empowerment of women in the trucking industry since 1980. Voie felt the need for such an organization while working as the Manager of Recruiting and Retention Programs at Schneider National.

== Activities ==
Since its founding in 2007, the organization has worked to raise awareness and encourage women to become truck drivers. In 2008, WIT held its first reception at the Mid-America Trucking Show in Louisville, Kentucky. Ellen Voie, as founder, later became the president and CEO of the organization and Leigh Foxall was named chairwoman. In 2010, WIT held its first annual “Salute to Women Behind the Wheel” and that same year gained a monthly feature on SiriusXM's Freewheelin’ show.

Mark Rousseau joined the board as the first male director in 2010. The board of directors is composed of industry leaders from major corporations such as Walmart, Daimler, Bendix, C. H. Robinson, Arrow Truck Sales, Peterbilt, Ryder System, Michelin, J.B. Hunt, FedEx and more. In the same year, Women In Trucking founded a scholarship program to strengthen education in the commercial transportation industry.

In 2012, WIT was recognized by the White House as a “Transportation Innovator Champion of Change!” In 2014, WIT designed a curriculum and created a transportation patch for the Girl Scouts. They also created a Girl Scout Patch and distributed it to the troops and held the first Girl Scout event, in Chicago, to educate young women about potential careers in the transportation industry. In 2014, the Women In Trucking Association also started a monthly segment on the Dave Nemo Show.

In 2012, Redefining the Road, became the association's official member publication.

In 2015, Women In Trucking then established the “Distinguished Woman in Logistics” award sponsored by TMW Systems and also created the WIT Index. It also held the first Accelerate! conference and expo in Dallas, Texas. Mary Aufdemberg also became the new chairwoman of the non-profit in March 2015 after Phyllis Cochran and Foxall.

In 2016, The Women in Trucking Association partnered with the National Transportation Institute for their WIT Index, to monitor and quantify the number of women drivers and management at organizations nationwide. They partnered again in 2019.

In 2016, WIT partnered with University of Wisconsin – Stout to release a recruiting guide for corporate members, “How to attract female drivers.”

In 2018, SiriusXM Road Dog announced that it would be launching a new radio show called, Women In Trucking, hosted by Ellen Voie to promote women employment in the trucking industry. The organization also introduced a 13-inch tall truck driver doll, Clare, which is sold at TA/Petro truck stops, HABAUSA and on Amazon. They recently also announced a collaboration with Expediter Services to create 150 women-owned businesses in transportation.

In 2019, Laura Roan Hays became chairwoman. In the third quarter of 2019, Kellylynn McLaughlin was named the Women In Trucking Association's first ambassador.

WIT works with The Federal Motor Carrier Safety Administration (FMCSA).

In 2023, Jennifer Hedrick was named the CEO and WIT's president after Ellen Voie.

== Partners ==
The organization is partnered with Bendix Commercial Vehicle Systems, Daimler Trucks North America, BMO Transportation Finance, Expediter Services, Great Dane, J.B. Hunt Transport, FedEx Freight, Michelin, Peterbilt, and Ryder Systems, Inc., and Walmart.

In 2010, Frito-Lay became Women In Trucking's first Gold Level Partner.
