= FedEx Ground =

American ground package delivery corporation

FedEx Ground Package System, Inc.
- Trade name: FedEx Ground
- Formerly: Roadway Package System (RPS; 1985–2000)
- Type: Subsidiary
- Industry: Transportation
- Founded: 1985; 41 years ago
- Founder: Roadway Services Inc.
- Headquarters: Moon Township, Pennsylvania, United States
- Area served: United States; Canada
- Key people: John A. Smith (president and CEO)
- Services: Package delivery
- Parent: Roadway Services (1985–1995); Caliber System (1995–1998); FedEx Corporation (1998-present)
- Subsidiaries: FedEx Ground Economy
- Website: Official website

FedEx Ground Package System, Inc., also known simply as FedEx Ground, is an American ground package delivery company headquartered in Moon Township, Pennsylvania, a suburb of Pittsburgh. It is a subsidiary of the FedEx Corporation. The company began as Roadway Package System (RPS), founded in 1985 by transportation company Roadway Services Inc., later renamed Caliber System. FedEx bought Caliber in 1998 to complement its existing FedEx Express business and rebranded Caliber's RPS package delivery service FedEx Ground in 2000.

FedEx Ground provides US and Canada domestic services as well as international services between the two, branded FedEx International Ground. Its services are cheaper than the time-definite services offered by FedEx Express and its drivers are primarily owner/operators, independent contractors who control individual delivery routes and territories. In addition to its core commercial package services, the company's services include FedEx Home Delivery, a US residential delivery service, and FedEx Ground Economy (formerly FedEx SmartPost), a low-cost parcel consolidation service.

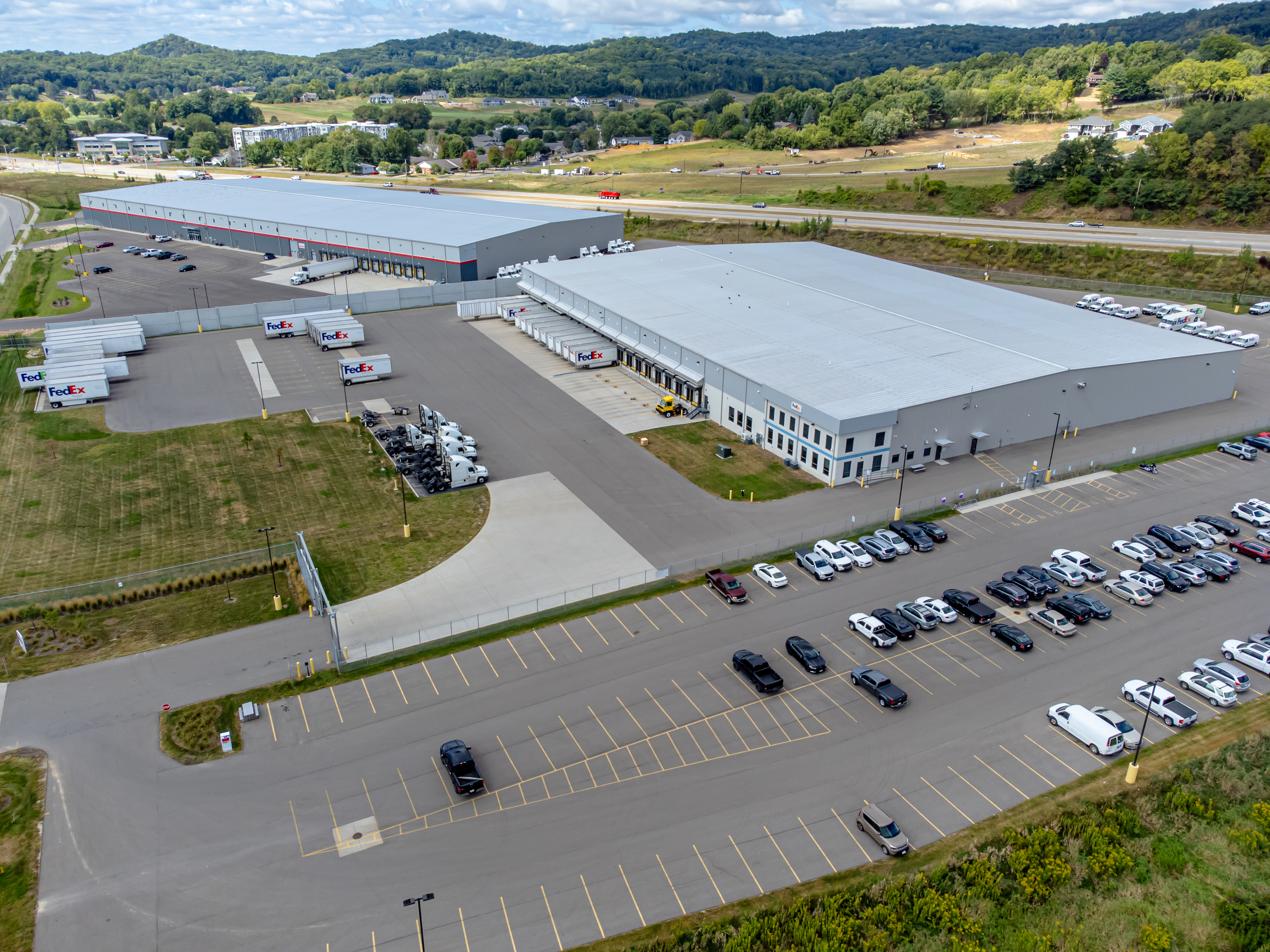
FedEx Ground facility in La Crosse, Wisconsin

== History ==
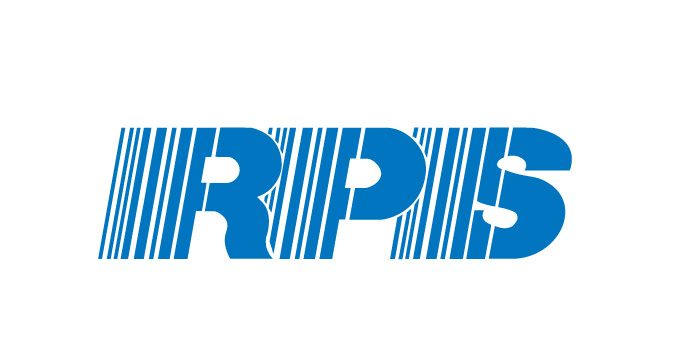
The RPS logo used until it was rebranded FedEx Ground

When RPS was founded on March 11, 1985, it intended to out-compete UPS Ground by focusing on efficiency and structuring itself for lower costs. One result of this drive for efficiency was RPS' use of barcodes on packages allowing it to track and sort shipments much more effectively. After an intensive effort to shift its operations to use the new technology, RPS became the first company able to track a package through the delivery cycle.

Its parent company, RSI, already owned a number of transportation companies including national less than truckload (LTL) carrier Roadway Express. This backing allowed RPS to grow quickly and by 1988 it was operating 130 terminals covering 70% of the US. After RSI spun off Roadway Express in 1995 and changed its name to Caliber System, RPS was its largest subsidiary.

In 1997, Fred Smith, founder of FedEx, contacted Dan Sullivan, co-founder of RPS and now president of Caliber System, about merging the two companies. FedEx, which at the time only offered air services, was under pressure from UPS which offered both air and ground services. By acquiring RPS, FedEx would get a fully fledged ground network to complement its existing air services. The acquisition of Caliber System was finalized in January 1998.

In preparation for this major acquisition, FedEx had reorganized as a holding company, FDX Corporation, in October 1997. When its acquisition of Caliber was finalized, FDX was the parent of both FedEx and Caliber's subsidiaries. It then embarked on significant reorganization to merge its existing business with the new subsidiaries. As part of this effort, it made broad changes to branding for the new acquisitions in 2000. FDX Corporation changed its name to FedEx Corporation, Federal Express was renamed FedEx Express, RPS became FedEx Ground, Caliber's same-day-critical trucking subsidiary, Roberts Express, became FedEx Custom Critical, and its LTL freight carrier, Viking Freight was re-branded FedEx Freight in 2001.

FedEx Ground launched a US residential delivery service, FedEx Home Delivery Service, in 2000. It was later renamed FedEx Home Delivery. In 2004, FedEx acquired New Berlin, Wisconsin-based parcel consolidator Parcel Direct from magazine and catalog printer Quad Graphics for $120 million. Following the acquisition, Parcel Direct was renamed FedEx SmartPost and became a subsidiary of FedEx Ground.

On January 14, 2013, FedEx named Henry Maier CEO and President of FedEx Ground, to take effect after David Rebholz retired on May 31, 2013.

Until 2018, most FedEx Ground US operations were five days a week, but this was expanded to six in September 2018 due to the rise in demand driven by e-commerce. Its US services were expanded again during the 2019 holiday peak season to seven days per week, a change which became permanent for the majority of the US population year-round in January 2020.

In 2021, a mass shooting occurred in the Indianapolis facility, killing 9 (including the perpetrator) and injuring 7. The attack was carried out by a former employee.

== Services ==
=== FedEx Ground ===
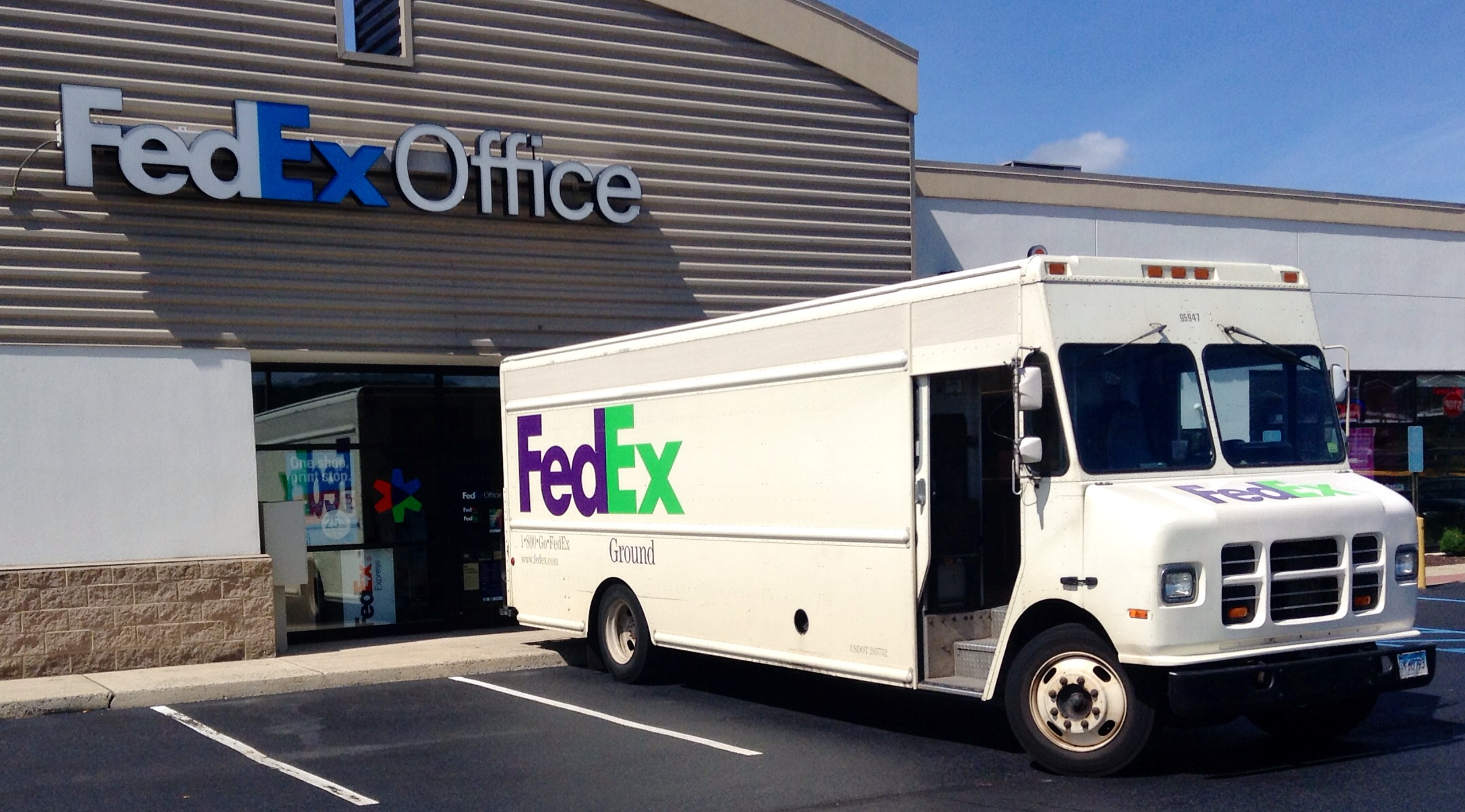
A FedEx Ground truck at a FedEx Office location

FedEx Ground is the division's core package delivery service which delivers daily to all 50 US states with delivery timeframes of 1-5 days for the Contiguous United States and 3-7 days for Alaska and Hawaii. Its FedEx International Ground service ships packages between the United States and Canada and within Canada.

Given its focus on deliveries to commercial locations, FedEx ground had operated on a five-day a week schedule (Monday-Friday). However, in 2018, it changed its year-round operating schedule to six-days a week (Monday-Saturday) for most US locations and subsequently to seven-days a week in January 2020.

=== FedEx Home Delivery ===
FedEx Home Delivery is a residential delivery service available in the US. It was launched as FedEx Home Delivery Service in 2000 delivering five days a week, Tuesday through Saturday. In 2020, the service expanded to seven days a week to most of the US. The maximum per package weight was also increased from 70 pounds to 150 pounds at the same time bringing it inline with the FedEx Ground limit.

=== FedEx Ground Economy ===
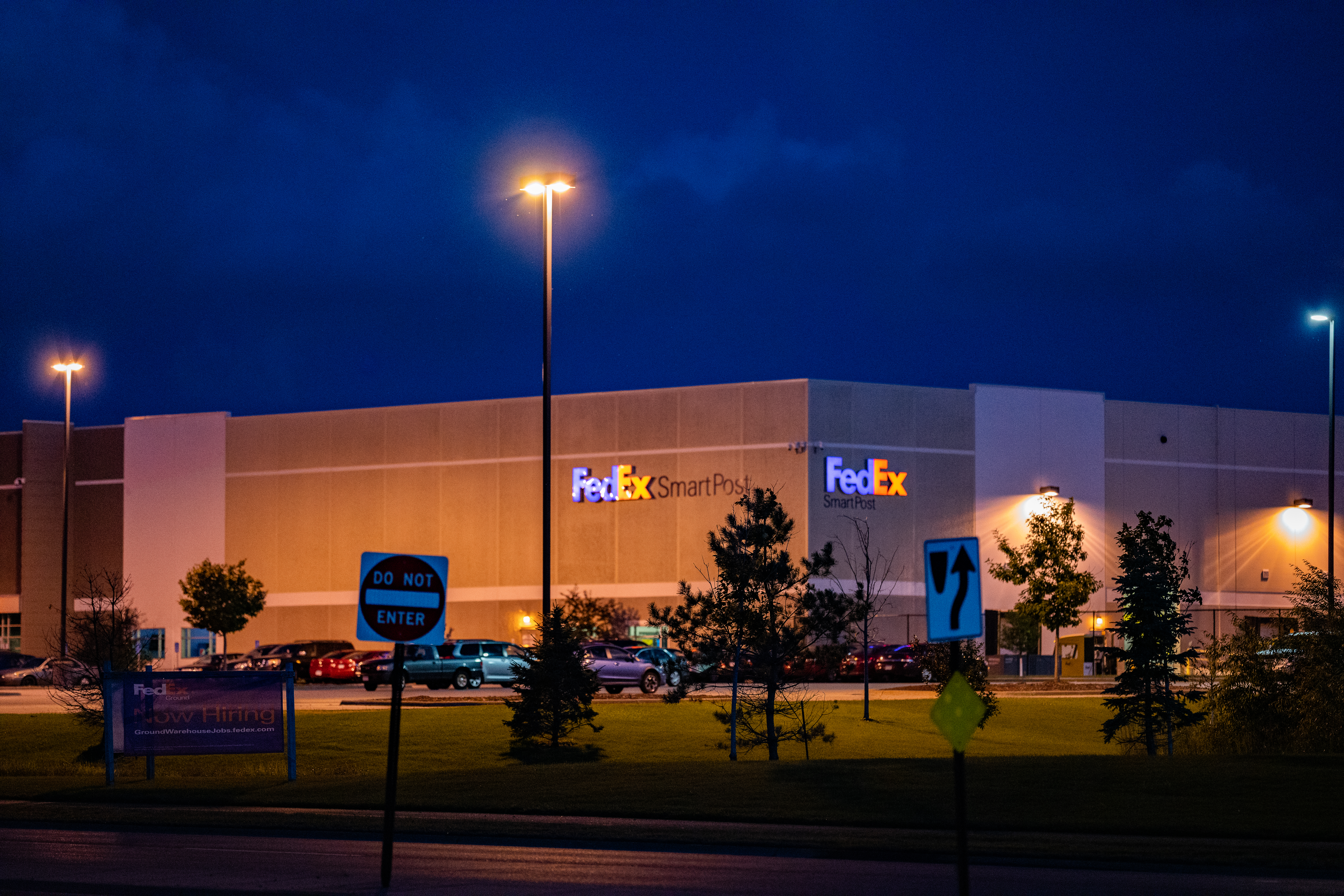
A FedEx SmartPost facility in Maple Grove, Minnesota

FedEx Ground Economy is a subsidiary of FedEx Ground which provides a parcel consolidation service most commonly used for residential deliveries of small, lightweight parcels. It is cheaper than ground package delivery but speeds are generally one to two days slower. Parcels are trackable but delivery dates are not guaranteed. The service is available only to shippers who meet certain requirements and have a SmartPost contract in place with FedEx.

Ground Economy was originally Parcel Direct, founded in 1998 by Quad Graphics to provide delivery services for its catalog publishing customers. Since its founding, Parcel Direct had expanded both its network of hub facilities and its parcel services by buying Commerce, California-based parcel delivery company PaqFast, Inc. in early 2004. When FedEx acquired it in 2004, Parcel Direct had 12 distribution hubs across the US and 450 employees.

Parcel Direct's parcel consolidation model relied on "zone skipping", a logistics approach where packages are transported most of the way to their destination through the carrier's network and handed over to the USPS for delivery. This reduces costs by allowing bulk transportation of parcels between hubs and not requiring it to maintain its own final mile delivery network.

Under FedEx, Parcel Direct was rebranded FedEx SmartPost and continued to grow its hub network, reaching 26 nationwide by 2021. Pickups from smaller shippers are performed by FedEx Ground which transfers them into the SmartPost network at the nearest hub. Dedicated FedEx SmartPost trailers pick up from larger shippers and transport shipments directly into the network.

Initially, all final mile deliveries were handled by the USPS. However, starting in 2019, FedEx began shifting SmartPost deliveries to its own Ground and Home Delivery networks and in 2020 said it had completed the shift and was delivering nearly all SmartPost packages itself. FedEx rebranded the service FedEx Ground Economy in 2021.

== Branding ==
Former logo; the green Ex was later changed to orange

In the early 2000s, most FedEx operating units used variants of the FedEx logo with a purple Fed followed by Ex in various colors. Only the FedEx Express unit used the original color combination of a purple Fed and orange Ex. The FedEx Ground logo used a green Ex under this branding. In August 2016, FedEx announced that it would be standardizing all its operating units to use the purple Fed and orange Ex previously used by FedEx Express. While the rebranding began in 2016, FedEx said it expected it to take until 2021 for all other color variants to be phased out across all operating units.
