= C. R. England =

American trucking company

- Type: Private
- Industry: Freight transport; Logistics
- Founded: 1920
- Founder: Chester Rodney England
- Headquarters: Salt Lake City, Utah, U.S.
- Website: www.crengland.com

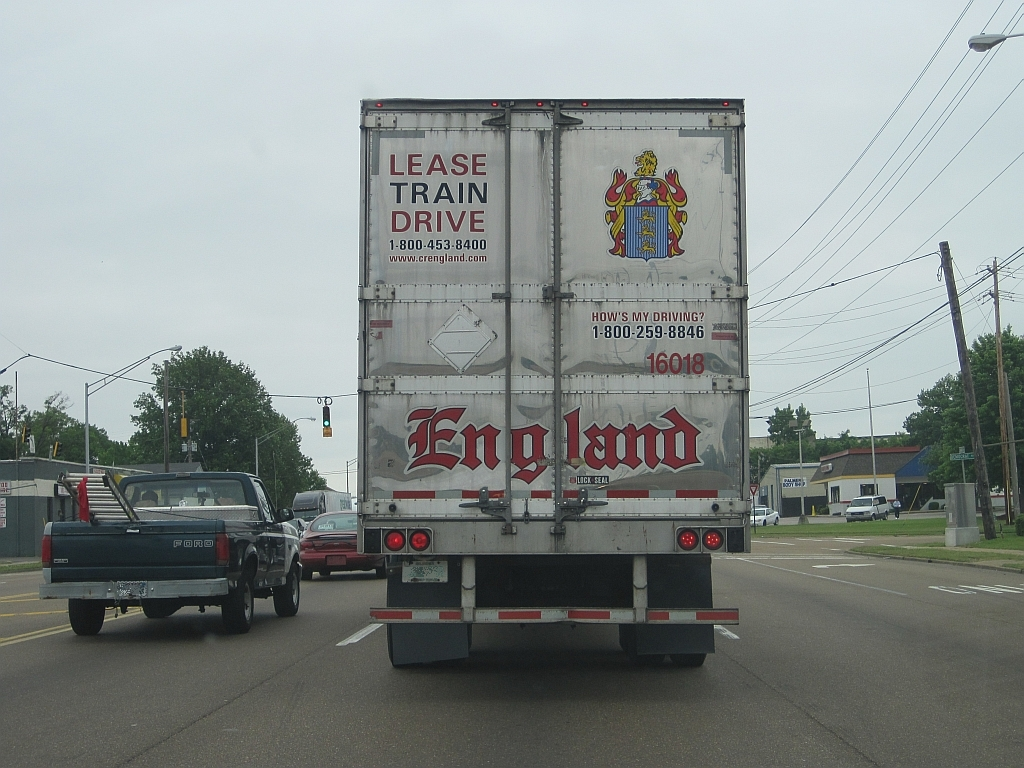
Rear view of a C. R. England trailer in 2012

C. R. England is an American trucking company headquartered in Salt Lake City, Utah. The company provides truckload shipping and other transportation services across the contiguous United States, Mexico, and Canada.

== History ==
The company was founded in 1920 by Chester Rodney England, who began hauling milk and farm products in Utah.

In the 1980s, C. R. England became one of the first trucking companies to adopt satellite monitoring systems to track its fleet and improve routing. The company also adopted technologies such as electronic data interchange links for invoicing.

In 2017, the sole group of unionized drivers at C. R. England voted to decertify, ending their union representation.

== Operations ==
C. R. England is a privately held company that has a fleet of more than 3,900 tractors and 4,000 drivers as of 2025. It also operates four schools across the United States for driver training. The company provides truckload shipping, intermodal transport, and other transportation services across the contiguous United States, Mexico, and parts of Canada.
