= American Freightways =

Former American regional trucking company

American Freightways Corp.
- Formerly: Arkansas Freightways (1982-1993)
- Company type: Public
- Industry: Transportation
- Founded: 1982; 43 years ago
- Founder: Sheridan Garrison
- Defunct: February 9, 2001
- Fate: Acquired by FedEx Freight
- Successor: FedEx Freight East
- Headquarters: Harrison, Arkansas, United States
- Areas served: Eastern, Midwestern, and Southern United States; Mexico; Canada; Caribbean; South America
- Key people: Tom Garrison (president and CEO)
- Number of employees: 17,000 (2001)

American Freightways Corp. (AF) was an American regional less than truckload (LTL) carrier based in Harrison, Arkansas. It was acquired by FedEx in 2001, renamed FedEx Freight East in 2002, and its operations were merged with FedEx's other LTL subsidiaries in 2010 to form FedEx Freight Inc.

== History ==
Sheridan Garrison founded The company Arkansas Freightways' on October 25, 1982. At its inception, it provided service to seven states from 20 terminals. Garrison had former experience in trucking, having bought a small Arkansas trucking company, Harp Line Trucks, which they renamed Garrison Motor Freight, in 1955 with his brother and father. By 1987 the company still served seven states but had grown to 58 terminals and had a combined 1,700 tractors and trailers and almost 1,000 employees.

Arkansas Freightways became a publicly held corporation in March 1989 with an over-the-counter stock offering. At the time, it served nine states with 1,200 employees and reported previous year profits of US$3.46 million on US$73 million in revenue. The company continued expansion in November announcing 13 new terminals in Texas bringing the network-wide total to 89.

In January 1993, Arkansas Freightways, which now served 12 states, changed its name to American Freightways Corp..

== FedEx acquisition ==
American Freightways was acquired by FedEx Corporation in 2001 for US$1.2 billion. FedEx created a new subsidiary, FedEx Freight to serve as the parent of both AF and FedEx's existing LTL subsidiary, Viking Freight, a western US regional carrier. The combination created the third largest LTL carrier in the United States after Con-way Freight and USFreightways.

In June 2002, FedEx rebranded AF as FedEx Freight East and Viking as FedEx Freight West, both still operated as independent subsidiaries of FedEx Freight. This marked the end of the American Freightways brand. FedEx expanded its LTL operations by buying Lakeland, Florida-based LTL carrier Watkins Motor Lines in 2006. Watkins was renamed FedEx National LTL and initially operated as a separate subsidiary of FedEx alongside FedEx Freight, both part of FedEx's FedEx Freight division.

In January 2010, FedEx merged its regional and national operations into a single entity, FedEx Freight Inc. marking the end of independent operations of the former American Freightways. The DOT number, 239039, which was initially assigned to American Freightways, remains in use by FedEx Freight, Inc.
