= Contract Freighters, Inc. =

American truckload carrier

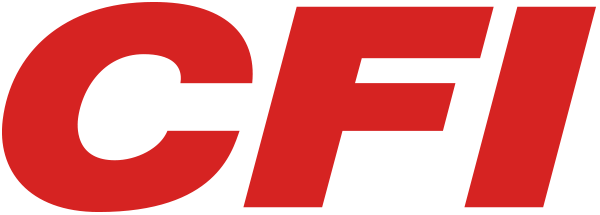
- CFI Logo used since 2016

- Truck in CFI livery parked in front of the company's Joplin headquarters.
- Trade name: CFI
- Formerly: Con-way Truckload (2007–2015); XPO, Inc. (2015–2016)
- Type: Subsidiary
- Industry: Transportation
- Founded: 1951; 75 years ago in Joplin, Missouri
- Founders: Roy Reed; Ursull Lewellan
- Headquarters: Joplin, Missouri
- Number of locations: 5 US Terminals; Laredo, Texas; West Memphis, Arkansas; Taylor, Michigan; Sanford, Florida; 1 Mexican Terminal; Nuevo Laredo, Tamaulipas
- Number of employees: 3,569
- Parent: Independent (1951-2007) Con-way (2007–2015); XPO, Inc. (2015–2016); TFI International (2016–2022); Heartland Express (since 2022)
- Website: cfidrive.com

Contract Freighters, Inc. (CFI), a subsidiary of Heartland Express, is an American truckload freight carrier headquartered in Joplin, Missouri, with operations in the continental United States, Canada, and Mexico. CFI provides point-to-point, full truckload, dry van service, as well as refrigerated transport, and utilizes single drivers as well as two-person driver teams over long-haul routes.

CFI was owned by Con-way, Inc. from 2007 to 2015 and known as Con-way Truckload. For a short period between 2015 and 2016, the company was owned by XPO, Inc. and known as XPO, Inc. Truckload. In 2016, it was acquired by Canadian logistics company TFI International, who returned it to its pre-2007 operations as a standalone truckload company under its original name, CFI. TFI sold the company to Heartland in 2022.

== History ==
Contract Freighters, Inc (CFI) was founded in 1951 in Joplin, Missouri by Roy Reed and Ursull Lewellan. The company began with one tractor and two trailers, and generated revenues of $12,000 during its first year.

CFI expanded services into Mexico providing through-trailer service since 1985. The first international office opened in 1987 in Monterrey, Mexico. One year later, the first Canadian office opened in Toronto. There are now 37 sales offices and four terminal locations in addition to the headquarters in Joplin.

Continued and consistent growth led to the expansion of the company's headquarters in 1993. The 300-acre site is home to the company's administrative offices, maintenance facilities, wash bay, and local driver services.

Equipment upgrades grew as rapidly as office locations. The first 48-foot trailer was purchased in 1986. Just three years later, the first air-ride trailer was delivered. Con-way Truckload, as CFI, was the first carrier to operate a 100% air-ride fleet.

In 2007, Con-way, Inc. determined that to become a viable commercial truckload company, an acquisition would be necessary to augment its existing truckload business which was built to service the needs of Con-way Freight. To meet this need, Con-way, Inc. acquired Contract Freighters, Inc. (CFI), a privately held North American truckload carrier based in Joplin, Missouri, for US$750 million. CFI was an industry leader at the time of acquisition, operating over 2,600 tractors and more than 7,000 trailers, with more than 3,000 employees including approximately 2,500 drivers. Previously, Con-way had been CFI's largest customer, accounting for six percent of total revenues.

The combination of Con-way Truckload and CFI provided a number of benefits. CFI had been Con-way Freight's largest provider of contract service for long-haul transcontinental truckload transportation. CFI had operations in Mexico for more than 20 years and was already one of the largest cross-border truckload carriers. Its capabilities could be combined with Con-way Freight's Mexico network and Menlo Worldwide Logistics's border-based logistics operations. The acquisition created a business unit with over US$500 million in annual revenues for truckload freight.

On October 31, 2015, XPO, Inc., headquartered in Greenwich, Connecticut, acquired Con-way Truckload. On October 27, 2016, XPO sold the truckload division to the Canadian-based company TFI International. Shortly after, the truckload division was renamed back to its original name, CFI.

CFI's truckload assets were acquired by Heartland Express for $525 million in 2022.

== Operations ==
CFI operated as Con-way Truckload from 2007 to 2015.

CFI operates from four dedicated truckload terminals and 37 sales offices throughout the United States, Canada and Mexico. As of 2021, CFI's operations included approximately 2,000 drivers, over 1,800 tractors, and over 7,000 trailers plus 700 contracted owner-operators.

=== Divisions ===
In addition to its core truckload operations, CFI operates several divisions:

- CFI Logistics: Logistics and transportation management services in the US, Canada, and Mexico including cross-border services
- CFI Mexico: Domestic logistics management and transportation services in Mexico plus cross-border services between the US and Mexico. CFI Mexico operations consist of two divisions:
  - CFI Logistica: Equivalent of US-based CFI Logistics operating in Mexico
  - CFI de Mexico: Transportation services within Mexico

=== Operations in Mexico ===
CFI began offering truckload services between the US and Mexico in 1985. In 1987 it opened an international office in Monterrey, Mexico. Since then, the company has expanded to also offer domestic Mexican logistics and transportation services. In 2020, CFI combined its existing Mexico divisions, CFI Logistica and CFI Mexico Truckload (later renamed CFI de Mexico), as subdivisions under a new division of CFI, CFI Mexico. According to the company, it had managed 62,000 cross-border shipments between the US and Mexico and 27,000 domestic Mexico LTL shipments in the previous year. As of 2021, the company operates a total of 12 facilities in Mexico.

CFI Mexico and its two divisions, CFI Logistica and CFI de Mexico, are headquartered in the World Trade Center Guadalajara in Guadalajara, Jalisco, Mexico. CFI Mexico also has a major facility in Laredo, Texas which it shares with CFI Logistics for management of services between the US and Mexico.

=== Military support ===
CFI participates in the US Department of Labor National Apprenticeship Program, which permits eligible veterans and active members of the Guard and Reserves to receive paid on-the-job training using G.I. Bill benefits. Fourteen percent of CFI's employees are self-selected veterans. The company has a history of supporting veteran associated charitable groups including Wreaths Across America, The Wall that Heals and Holy Joe's Café.
