= TFI International =

Canadian trucking and logistics company

TFI International Inc.
- TFI International logo
- Formerly: Transport Cabano (1957–1985); Groupe Cabano-d'Anjou (1985-1987); Cabano Expéditex Group (1988-1990); Cabano Transportation Group (1990-1992); Cabano-Kingsway (1992–1999); TransForce Inc. (1999–2002; 2008-2016); TransForce Income Fund (2002–2008)
- Type: Public
- Traded as: TSX: TFII; NYSE: TFII; S&P/TSX Composite Index component
- Industry: Transportation
- Founded: 1957; 69 years ago in Cabano, Quebec, Canada
- Founders: Reno Émond; Réal Émond
- Headquarters: Head office: Montreal, Quebec, Canada; Executive office: Etobicoke, Ontario, Canada
- Number of locations: 571 facilities: 160 in Eastern Canada; 86 in Western Canada; 318 in the United States; 12 in Mexico
- Key people: Alain Bédard (chairman, president & CEO); André Bérard (corporate and lead director); David Saperstein (CFO)
- Revenue: ▲US$8.400 billion (2024)
- Operating income: ▲US$889 million (2024)
- Net income: ▲US$422 million (2024)
- Total assets: ▲US$3,960 million (2021)
- Total equity: ▲US$2,220 million (2021)
- Number of employees: 29,539 (2021)
- Divisions: Package and Courier; LTL; Truckload; Logistics
- Subsidiaries: Over 80 including; TForce Freight; TST-CF Express
- Website: tfiintl.com

TFI International Inc. is a Canadian transport and logistics company based in Saint-Laurent, Quebec, a borough of Montreal. It operates primarily in Canada, the United States, and Mexico through 4 business segments: less than truckload (LTL), package and courier, logistics, and truckload. It has Canada's largest LTL business, largest trucking fleet, and in 2021 was ranked 6th in terms of revenue among both LTL and truckload North American carriers. Its trucking fleet consists of over 14,000 company-owned power units, nearly 10,000 owner-operator tractors, nearly 50,000 trailers and over 200 straight trucks.

Since the mid-1990s, the company's main source of growth has been through the acquisition of smaller logistics companies (over 190 between 1996 and 2021), many of which continue operating as subsidiaries.

== History ==
=== Foundation and early history ===
The company was founded by Reno and Réal Émond in 1957 as a regional trucking service in Cabano, Quebec. Cabano Transport expanded its operations mainly in Quebec and the Maritimes through a series of acquisitions. In 1985, Cabano Transport purchased D'Anjou Transport and changed its name to Groupe Cabano-d'Anjou.

In 1987, the company acquired Groupe Expéditex and changed its name to Cabano Expeditex Group Inc.. The same year, it also acquired Groupe Brazeau Inc. from La Verendrye Management Corp. for CA$14.4 million and Expeditex Inc. for CA$12.5 million. Cabano had reported a profit of CA$1.7 million in 1986 but both Brazeau and Expeditex had been unprofitable. The purchases increased Cabano's fleet from 700 to 5,000 vehicles making it the largest trucking company in Quebec and fourth-largest in Canada. Following the acquisitions, Cabano Expeditex focused on reducing debt shutting down 15 terminals by October 1987, had plans to shutter 4 more, and expected to reduce administrative staff at the new acquisitions by about 40% and unionized workers by about 10%.

Cabano Expeditex was forced to restructure its finances under pressure in 1988 and the next year reported losses of CA$16 million. By 1990, however, it was recovering and reported a profit of CA$4 million for the 1990 fiscal year. In July, it acquired the general freight operations of Clarke Transport Routier for CA$2.9 million. This deal added 610 rolling stock units and 300-400 employees to Cabano Expeditex's existing 2,100 employees and 3,200 vehicles. In December 1990 the company changed its name to Cabano Transportation Group.

In 1992, Cabano acquired Ontario-based Kingsway Transports Ltd. and its US operations from Kingsway's parent, Winnipeg-based Federal Industries Ltd. Following the purchase, Cabano changed its name to Cabano-Kingsway. The combined company operated 1,200 trucks, 3,400 trailers, and 63 service centers, and about 3,000 employees in eastern Canada and 19 northern US states. Cabano had been Canada's fourth largest trucking company but this deal meant it surpassed Reimer Express and TNT Canada to become the second largest after CP Express.

=== Strategy shift ===
In 1997, Cabano Kingsway made significant management changes focused on operational efficiency and cost reductions. The company had been severely impacted by a strike in 1996, resulting in an earnings deficit. One key focus of the new management team was to reduce risk by diversifying its service offerings. Early acquisitions, therefore, were primarily intended to increase efficiency and grow new markets and services.

By following their acquisitions strategy and divesting non-core assets, the company subsequently experienced a significant increase in revenue with a much lower increase in expenses. In 1999, it changed its name to TransForce Inc.

In February 2000, TransForce acquired TST Solutions, the parent of US and Canadian LTL carrier TST Overland Express. This purchase represented a significant increase to TransForce's presence in the US. Post acquisition, TST continued to operate as an independent subsidiary.

The company made major changes to its structure in 2002, when it converted itself into an income fund known as TransForce Income Fund.

=== Diversification and expansion ===
Also in 2002, TransForce acquired Brampton, Ontario-based parcel-delivery company Canpar Courier. Canpar provides domestic services directly and cross-border services via interline agreements with other carriers and had been established in 1976 as a division of Canadian Pacific Trucks. By the time of its acquisition, Canpar operated 53 terminals and 1,000 vehicles and had reported revenues of approximately $150 million in 2001.

Another significant purchase came in January 2004, when TransForce acquired the assets of Canadian Freightways from the recently bankrupt US trucking company, Consolidated Freightways. The deal was reported at CA$69.6 million plus assumption of debt worth CA$15 million. Canadian Freightways offered LTL, truckload, warehousing, brokerage, and other logistics services. With acquisitions and organic growth, by 2005 TransForce was Canada's largest trucking company operating two dozen subsidiaries with a combined nearly 3,500 trucks and 9,000 trailers.

TransForce again expanded its courier services in October 2007 with the purchase of ICS Courier and its parent Century II Holdings Inc. Founded in 1978 as Information Communication Services, Toronto-based ICS primarily focused on commercial shipments including parcel and document services and claimed 35,000 accounts, more than 1,300 employees and owner-operators, and 35 offices.

In 2008, as part of a corporate restructuring, TransForce Income Fund changed its name back to TransForce Inc., the name it had used from 1999 to 2002.

In November 2009, TransForce acquired the Retail Solutions Division of ATS Andlauer Transportation Services (ATS). The division focuses on the retail and supply chain sectors and was renamed TForce Integrated Solutions on January 1, 2014.

TransForce expanded its energy services portfolio in 2010 when it acquired Speedy Heavy Hauling for US$32 million and a 19% equity interest in Speedy's parent, Calgary-based EnQuest Energy Services. Speedy focused on the US market and was merged with TransForce's prior US-based energy services acquisition, Hemphill Trucking, to form Hemphill-Speedy.

=== US and further Canadian expansion ===
TransForce moved into the US parcel market with its December 2010 acquisition of Dallas-based Dynamex (Nasdaq: DDMX) for US$248 million. The company provided parcel delivery and logistics services in both the US and Canada and had reported revenues of US$418 million in the fiscal year ending October 31, 2010. Dynamex would be renamed TForce Logistics. Additional parcel expansion came in June 2011 when TransForce acquired the domestic Canadian business of DHL Express. The division would be operated as Loomis Express and continued to focus on domestic services while offering international services via an alliance with DHL Express.

TransForce once again reorganized its energy services holdings in 2012 by consolidating its Canadian subsidiaries Kos Oilfield Transportation and Howard's Transport with their US counterparts Hemphill-Speedy and I.E. Miller to form TForce Energy Services.

A months long campaign by TransForce to acquire one of its largest rivals, Canadian truckload carrier Contrans Group Inc., and its subsidiaries for CA$495 million completed successfully on January 15, 2015. Contrans comprised 12 trucking companies primarily in the truckload and specialty truckload markets. Earlier in the year, Contrans as a whole was reported to have operated 1,493 tractors, 2,541 trailers, and 39 straight trucks. The same report showed TransForce with 3,774 tractors, 12,486 trailers, and 3,288 straight trucks across all divisions. Most Contrans subsidiaries continued to operate as TransForce subsidiaries following acquisition.

By 2016, TransForce already had a large LTL presence in the US via a variety of acquisitions but their truckload market share increased significantly with the October purchase of XPO Logistics Truckload, the truckload division of US freight carrier and broker XPO Logistics. The purchase price was reported to be US$558 million. XPO had purchased US carrier Con-Way the previous year but didn't find its truckload division, Con-Way Truckload, to be a good fit for XPO's strategic direction.

TransForce renamed the division CFI, the original name of the company acquired by Con-Way which had been rebranded Con-Way Truckload.

In December 2016 the company changed its name to TFI International in a move it said "better reflects the increased geographic scope of its operations." This "increased geographic scope" was illustrated by the company's 2016 reports which showed 53% of its business was in Canada and 47% was in the US.

TFI acquired third-party-logistics provider DLS Worldwide from U.S. company, R. R. Donnelley & Sons Company for US$225 million in November 2020. DLS was renamed TForce Worldwide (later renamed again TFWW) and continued to operate from the former DLS headquarters in Bolingbrook, Illinois. In September 2023, TFI International acquired British Columbia-based Vedder Transportation Group.

=== UPS Freight acquisition ===
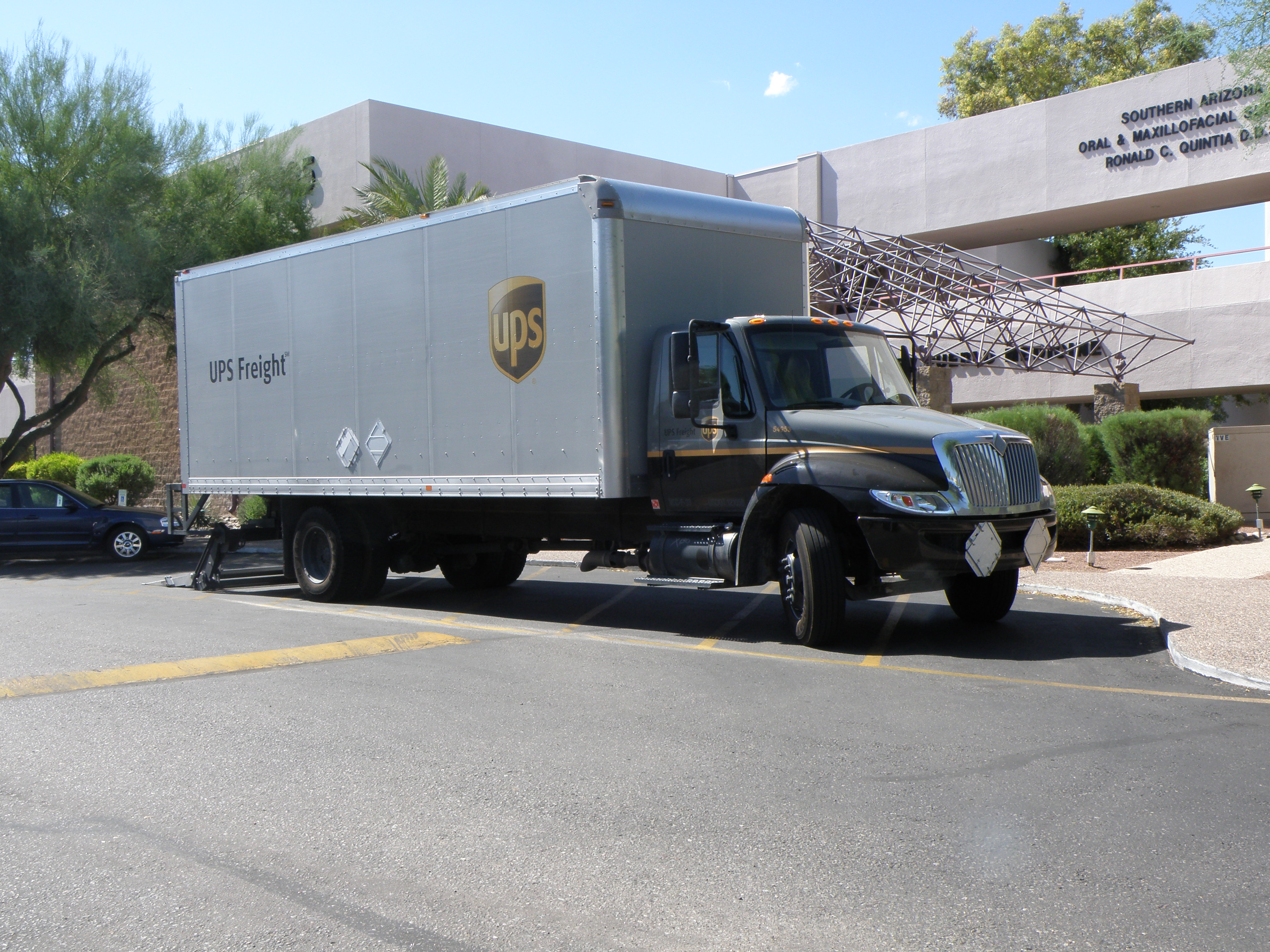
UPS Freight straight truck. UPS Freight was acquired by TFI in 2021 and renamed TForce Freight.

In January 2021, TFI agreed to purchase UPS' LTL and truckload subsidiary UPS Freight for US$800 million. At the time, the acquisition was the second largest deal in North American trucking history after the 2017 merger of Swift Transportation and Knight Transportation and made TFI one of the largest trucking companies in North America.

UPS Freight had been formed in 2005 when UPS acquired LTL carrier Overnite Transportation and its subsidiary Motor Cargo for US$1.25 billion. In the purchase UPS expected to find synergies between the LTL services of Overnite and UPS' core package services. The move was also a bid to head off rival FedEx which had recently expanded into LTL via a series of acquisitions. However, for UPS the expected synergies did not materialize to the extent expected and the company decided to sell off its freight business and refocus on small package services.

The TFI acquisition of UPS Freight was completed in April 2021 and nearly doubled TFI's size to US$6.5 billion in annual revenue. The division's core LTL services were rebranded TForce Freight and would continue to operate out of the carrier's Richmond, Virginia headquarters. The smaller truckload business, representing about 10% of revenues, would be transferred to TFI's other US truckload companies. TFI announced plans to invest US$50 million to US$75 million into the new division for fleet upgrades including replacing about 1,000 trucks as well as price renegotiations with customers.

TFI sold CFI to US trucking company Heartland Express for US$525 million in August 2022. The sale included CFI's US truckload unit and Mexican logistics unit, CFI Logistica. TFI retained CFI's dedicated truckload business, CFI Dedicated (formerly Transport America), and US brokerage operation, CFI Logistics.

=== 2024 acquisitions ===
In March 2024, TFI acquired Hercules Forwarding. In April 2024, the company acquired Daseke for $1.1 billion. In June, the company acquired Entreposage Marco, a food-grade truck hauler. In July the same year, TFI acquired Groupe CRS Express, a flatbed and heavy-haul carrier based out in Canada.

=== 2025 abandoned move to the U.S. ===
In February 2025, TFI announced their intention to move their headquarters to the U.S. The company claims 70% of its operation is in that country. TFI later decided to abandon moving to the U.S. after shareholder backlash.

== Operations ==
=== Financial performance ===
Financial performance (in millions USD) (Note: TFI switched from reporting in CAD to USD effective Dec 31, 2020 but included USD figures for FY 2018 and 2019 in its 2020 Annual Report)
| FY | Rev. | Op. income | Net income | Total assets | Total equity | Emp. (Note: Employees as of Dec 31 of the FY) | Ref/ Note |
|---|---|---|---|---|---|---|---|
| 2018 | $3,954.8 | $332.0 | $224.8 | $2,968.7 | $1,155.9 | 17,127 | |
| 2019 | $3,903.5 | $382.9 | $233.7 | $3,508.8 | $1,159.3 | 17,150 | |
| 2020 | $3,484.3 | $416.6 | $275.7 | $3,849.4 | $1,790.2 | 16,753 | |
| 2021 | $7,220.4 | $889.2 | $664.4 | $3,960.2 | $2,220.3 | 29,539 | |
| 2022 | | | | | | | |
| 2023 | $7,520 | $757.6 | $504.9 | | | | |
| 2024 | $8,400 | $719 | $422.5 | | | | |

Percentage of revenue breakdown
| FY | By segment/ business unit | | | | By country | | | Ref/ Note |
| FY | TL | LTL | Package/ courier | Logistics | CA | US | MX | Ref/ Note |
|---|---|---|---|---|---|---|---|---|
| 2017 | 45% | 20% | 14% | 21% | 56.5% | 43.1% | 0.4% | |
| 2018 | 46% | 21% | 14% | 19% | 56.3% | 43.3% | 0.4% | |
| 2019 | 48% | 18% | 14% | 20% | 54.7% | 44.9% | 0.4% | |
| 2020 | 46% | 15% | 14% | 25% | 52.5% | 47.0% | 0.5% | |
| 2021 | 30% | 39% | 9% | 23% | 32.8% | 66.9% | 0.3% | |

=== Corporate Management ===
Since the late 1990s, TFI has been led by chairman, president, & CEO Alain Bédard. Notable members of the TFI board include former president, CEO, and chairman of the National Bank of Canada André Bérard, former founder and president of CF Montréal Joey Saputo, and former journalist and National Assembly of Quebec member Richard Guay. From 2007 to August 2021 Lucien Bouchard was a member of TFI's board. Bouchard had held a number of senior political positions in Canada including Secretary of State, Premier of Quebec, and Ambassador to France.

=== Business segments ===
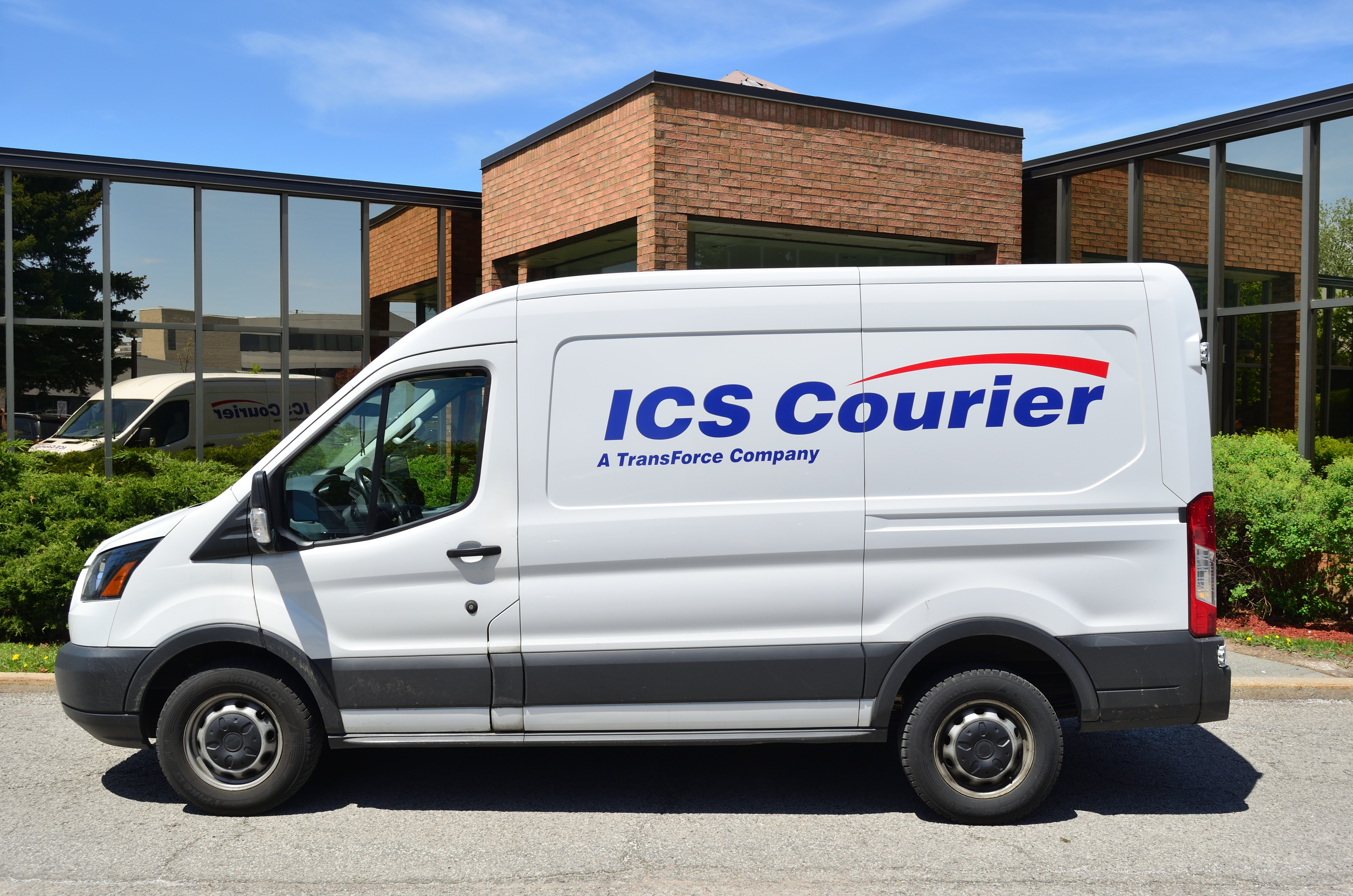
ICS Courier van

TFI organizes its divisions and subsidiaries into four business segments.

==== Package and courier ====
The company owns four subsidiaries which together form its package and courier segment. These are:

- Canpar Express
- ICS Courier
- Loomis Express
- TForce Integrated Solutions

==== Less-than-truckload ====
There are several divisions/subsidiaries in TFI's less-than-truckload (LTL) segment. These are a mix of road and intermodal providers. Notable subsidiaries include:

- Intermodal:
- Clarke Transport
- National Fast Freight
- Vitran
- Saint-Michel Transportation
- Axsun Group
- Road freight:
- Cavalier
- TForce Freight
- TST-CF Express

==== Truckload ====
The Truckload segment consists of 43 divisions/subsidiaries providing truckload shipping services. In addition to standard dry van services, subsidiaries also provide specialized truckload services such as flatbed, tank, and intermodal transportation. Notable subsidiaries in this segment include:

- Specialized:
- BTC
  - East
  - West
- Contrans
  - Flatbed Group
  - Tank Group
  - Vrac
- Fleetway
- Kingsway Bulk
- Conventional:
- CFI Dedicated (formerly Transport America)
- SGT (formerly SGT 2000)(SGT no longer in operation as of July 2024)

==== Logistics ====
TFI's Logistics segment is composed of 21 divisions/subsidiaries which provide logistics and transportation management services. Most divisions and subsidiaries primarily handle general freight but some are specialized around certain industries such as chemical transportation and medical logistics. Notable subsidiaries in this segment include:

- CFI Logistics
- Craler
- DSN Chemical Transportation
- Cornerstone Logistics
- FreightLine
- Guardian Medical Logistics
- Stream Logistics
- TForce Logistics

=== Acquisitions ===
Since 1997, TFI's primary growth strategy has been through acquisitions having acquired over 180 companies between 1996 and 2020. These include a number of major transportation-related investments and dozens of "tuck-in" acquisitions intended to complement existing operations. TFI gives most subsidiaries (which are largely former independent companies) a certain level of autonomy. That allows each subsidiary to continue to cater to different regional markets and segments as a specialized interest. TFI International then uses its influence and cash flow to help increase the capacity of each subsidiary (like it did in 2010 when its purchase of a 52-door cross dock terminal in Calgary tripled the capacity of TST Overland and expanded its shipping network).

List of TFI International acquisitions
| No. | Company | Services | Location | Acquired on | Acquired for | Disposition | Ref. |
|---|---|---|---|---|---|---|---|
| 1 | Divisions of Logistec Corp.; Logistec Trucking | — | Canada, Montreal, Quebec | 1978 | — | — | |
| 2 | Subsidiary of La Verendrye Management; Brazeau | — | Canada | 1987 | CA$14.4 million | Western Canada operations sold to Reimer Express Lines; Maritimes operations shut down | |
| 3 | Expeditex | — | Canada | 1987 | CA$12.5 million | — | |
| 4 | General freight operations of Clarke Transport Routier; Clarke Transport; Norway Transport; Chicoutimi Transport; Cho Bo and Beauce Express | — | Canada | 1990 | CA$2.9 million | — | |
| 5 | Divisions of Federal Industries; Kingsway Transports Ltd.; Kingsway Transports Inc. | LTL | Canada, Rexdale, Ontario; USA, Brook Park, Ohio | 1992 | — | Merged with Cabano to become Cabano-Kingsway; In 1999 Cabano-Kingsway renamed TransForce | |
| 6 | Thompson's Transfer Company | — | — | 1997 | — | — | |
| 7 | Transport Super Rapide | — | — | 1998 | — | — | |
| 8 | Transport J.C.Germain | Truckload | Canada | March 1998 | — | Now JCG | |
| 9 | Transport LeBon | Specialty truckload | Canada | 1998 | — | Merged with TransForce's bulk cargo division to form Kingsway Bulk in 2001 | |
| 10 | Groupe Papineau; Papineau International Transport | Truckload | Canada | October 1998 | — | — | |
| 11 | Transport M. Courchesne | — | — | 1998 | — | — | |
| 12 | Raynald April | — | — | 1998 | — | — | |
| 13 | Transport Nordique | — | — | 1999 | — | — | |
| 14 | Transport R Mondor | — | — | 1999 | — | — | |
| 15 | Enterprises Yves Labonte | — | — | 1999 | — | — | |
| 16 | Transport McGill | — | — | 1999 | — | — | |
| 17 | Transless | — | — | 1999 | — | — | |
| 18 | TST Solutions; TST Overland Express; TST Expedited Services; three additional subsidiaries | LTL; Specialty Transport | Canada, Mississauga, Ontario | March 2000 | CA$85 million | TST Expedited continued as an independent subsidiary; TST Overland initially an independent subsidiary until 2020 when it merged with TFI subsidiary Canadian Freightways to form TST-CF Express in 2020 | |
| 19 | DCA Express 24 | — | — | 2000 | — | — | |
| 20 | Distribution de Colis les Appalaches | — | — | 2000 | — | — | |
| 21 | Enterprises RR Mondor | — | — | 2000 | — | — | |
| 22 | Retex Transport | Specialty truckload | Canada, Quebec City, Quebec | June 2002 | CA$5 million | — | |
| 23 | Canpar Transport | Parcel | Canada, Mississauga, Ontario | July 2002 | CA$39.5 million | — | |
| 24 | Transport Mirald | Truckload | Canada, Boucherville, Quebec | 16 August 2002 | — | — | |
| 25 | Transport Forestville | Specialty truckload | Canada, Quebec City, Quebec | 26 February 2003 | — | — | |
| 26 | Subsidiary of Consolidated Freightways; Canadian Freightways (Note: This was an asset-only purchase where TFI acquired the majority of the assets of the company but not the company itself.) | LTL; Truckload; Logistics; Fleet management; Customs brokerage; Warehousing; International freight forwarding | Canada, Calgary, Alberta | January 2004 | CA$69.6 million | Independent subsidiary (2004–2020); Merged with TFI subsidiary TST Overland Express to form TST-CF Express in 2020 | |
| 27 | Transport S.A.S. | — | Canada, Drummondville, Quebec | 2004 | — | — | |
| 28 | Transport George Lacaille | — | Canada, Quebec | 2004 | — | — | |
| 29 | Transpel | Truckload | Canada, Boucherville, Quebec | May 2004 | — | — | |
| 30 | Highland Transport | Truckload | Canada Toronto, Ontario | October 2004 | — | Shut down by TFI in 2019 | |
| 31 | Services Matrec | Waste Management | — | February 2005 | — | Sold to GFL Environmental in February 2016 for CA$800 million | |
| 32 | Porter Trucking | — | Canada, Calgary, Alberta | 15 February 2005 | — | — | |
| 33 | Groupe Grégoire | Truckload | Canada, Plessisville, Quebec | 5 May 2005 | — | — | |
| 34 | Express Golden Eagle | Truckload | Canada, Bois-des-Filion, Quebec | 2005 | — | Now Golden International | |
| 35 | Rebel Transport | Truckload | Canada, Edmonton, Alberta | 5 May 2005 | — | — | |
| 36 | Kos Corp. Oilfield Transportation | Rig-moving | Canada Drayton Valley, Alberta | 2006 | — | Independent subsidiary (2006–2012); June 2012 merged with other TFI subsidiaries to form TForce Energy Services | |
| 37 | Hemphill Trucking | Rig-moving | USA, Grand Junction, Colorado | 2006 | — | Independent subsidiary (2006–2010); Acquired assets of Speedy Heavy Hauling and changed name to Hemphill-Speedy (2010–2012); June 2012 merged with other TFI subsidiaries to form TForce Energy Services | |
| 38 | Howard's Transport Services | Rig-moving | Canada | 2006 | — | Independent subsidiary (2006–2012); June 2012 merged with other TFI subsidiaries to form TForce Energy Services | |
| 39 | Streeper Contracting | Rig-moving | — | 2006 | — | — | |
| 40 | Westfreight Holdings; Westfreight Systems | Specialized Truckload | USA | 4 January 2007 | — | — | |
| 41 | Century II Holdings; Information Communication Services DBA ICS Courier | Courier | Canada, Toronto, Ontario | 31 October 2007 | — | — | |
| 42 | Location Beaudry | Equipment leasing; Staffing | — | 2007 | — | — | |
| 43 | Les Consultants en Personnel Logipro | Equipment leasing; Staffing | — | 2007 | — | — | |
| 44 | MTC Agence de Personnel | Equipment leasing; Staffing | — | 2007 | — | — | |
| 45 | Division of ATS Andlauer Transportation Services; Retail Solutions | Customized Freight | — | 19 November 2009 | — | Independent subsidiary as TForce Integrated Solutions | |
| 46 | Thibodeau Group | Truckload; LTL | Canada, Portneuf, Quebec | November 2007 | — | — | |
| 47 | GHL Transport | Specialty truckload | Canada, Anjou, Quebec | 2008 | — | — | |
| 48 | Kingsway Alimentaire | Specialty truckload | Canada, Anjou, Quebec | 2008 | — | — | |
| 49 | Centre de Mécanique Henri Bourassa (CMHB) | Tank repair and maintenance | Canada, Anjou, Quebec | 2008 | — | — | |
| 50 | Subsidiaries of EnQuest Energy Services; Speedy Heavy Hauling; Other small, US subsidiaries | Rig-moving | USA | 2010 | US$32 million | Assets absorbed by TFI subsidiary Hemphill Trucking which was renamed Hemphill-Speedy | |
| 51 | Concord Transportation | LTL; Truckload | Canada Toronto, Ontario | August 2011 | CA$10 million (Note: Purchase price included $2 million in company shares. Prior to acquisition, Concord had annual revenues of $35 million, 96 employees and offices in Illinois, California and Washington in addition to Western Canada.) | — | |
| 52 | Dynamex | Same-day parcel delivery | USA Dallas, Texas | December 2010 | US$248 million | Independent subsidiary as TForce Logistics | |
| 53 | IE Miller Services (Note: Prior to acquisition the company, founded in 1936, operated eight terminals in Texas, Louisiana, Oklahoma, North Dakota and Colorado with a workforce of approximately 400. It was a former subsidiary of Complete Production Services.) | — | USA | 30 November 2011 | — | — | |
| 54 | Pedersen Transport | LTL; Truckload | Canada Alberta | December 2011 | — | | — |
| 55 | Domestic business of DHL Express Canada | Parcel | Canada | 2011 | US$25 million | Independent subsidiary as Loomis Express | |
| 56 | Quik X Transportation | LTL Intermodal | Canada Mississauga, Ontario | January 2012 | — | — | |
| 57 | Subsidiaries of Clarke Inc.; Clarke Transport; Clarke Road Transport | LTL; Intermodal LTL; Truckload | Canada | January 2014 | CA$88 million | — | |
| 58 | Vitran Corporation | LTL; Intermodal LTL; Truckload; (Note: By November 2013, TransForce owned approximately 19.95% of Vitran's shares and had signed a "lock-up" agreement that would require Vitran to sell to TransForce if it made an offer. Vitran agreed to be acquired by Manitoulin Transport Inc. in December 2013 but reversed its decision and accepted the TransForce offer in January. When acquired, Vitran had already sold its Supply Chain Operation (SCO) unit to 3PL Legacy Supply Chain Solutions in March 2013 and its US LTL business in October.) | Canada Toronto, Ontario | March 2014 | CA$136 million | — | |
| 59 | Subsidiary of Hazen Transport; Hazen Final Mile | — | USA | May 2014 | — | — | |
| 60 | Transport America | Truckload | USA, Minnesota | 2014 | US$310 million | Rebranded CFI Dedicated in 2021 | |
| 61 | Contrans Group Inc.; Archer Trucking; Glen Tay Trucking; Laidlaw Carriers Tank; Peter Hodge Transport; Tri-Line Carriers; Brookville Carriers; Contrans Flatbed Group; Laidlaw Carriers Bulk; S&S Enterprises; Laidlaw Carriers Van; Tripar Transportation; Cornerstone Logistics | Truckload; Specialty Truckload; Logistics Management | Canada, Woodstock, Ontario | 11 November 2014 | CA$495 million | Most subsidiaries continued independent operations as TransForce subsidiaries; Archer, Glen Tay, and Laidlaw Tank were merged with Keith Hall, Canadian Bulk Carriers (CBC), and Future Transportation to form TFI subsidiary Contrans Tank Group | |
| 62 | Truckload operations of XPO Logistics; Transportation Resources Inc. (Note: This unit included the former Con-way Truckload operations which XPO had acquired in 2015. Con-way Truckload was the rebranding of Contract Freighters Inc. (CFI) following Con-way's 2007 purchase of that carrier.) | Truckload | USA, Joplin, Missouri | October 2016 | US$558 million | Independent subsidiary as CFI until sold to Heartland Express in 2022 | |
| 63 | Villeneuve Tank Lines | Specialty truckload | — | 2017 | — | Merged with Brasseur Transport to form Contrans Vrac | |
| 64 | Division of AmerisourceBergen subsidiary World Courier; World Courier Ground US | Medical Same-Day Parcel; Expedited Trucking; Warehousing | USA | 13 January 2017 | — | Division of Dynamex as TForce Critical | |
| 65 | Cavalier Transportation Services | LTL; Brokerage; Warehousing | Canada, Bolton, Ontario | 28 January 2017 | — | — | |
| 66 | Les enterprises Dupont | Specialty truckload | Canada, Montreal, Quebec | 28 May 2017 | — | — | |
| 67 | Premier Product Management | Household appliance delivery | USA, California | 31 October 2017 | — | — | |
| 68 | Normandin Transit | LTL; Truckload | Canada, Quebec | 3 April 2018 | — | — | |
| 69 | Brasseur Transport | Liquid bulk truckload | Canada, Quebec | 1 May 2018 | — | Merged with Villeneuve to form Contrans Vrac | |
| 70 | Timeline Logistic | Oil and Gas; Forestry | Canada, Saskatoon, Saskatchewan | 1 July 2018 | — | — | |
| 71 | Gorski Bulk Transport | Tank truck transport | Canada, Ontario | 1 October 2018 | — | Independent subsidiary, now GBT | |
| 72 | Double-D Transport | Oversized freight | Canada, Ontario | 1 November 2018 | — | — | |
| 73 | SAF Transport | Specialty truckload | Canada, Quebec | 21 November 2018 | — | — | |
| 74 | A. Beaumont Transport | Specialty truckload | Canada, Quebec | 1 December 2018 | — | — | |
| 75 | Hughson Trucking | Oil and Gas; Forestry | Canada, Alberta | 4 December 2018 | — | — | |
| 76 | Cole Carriers Corp. | Supply Chain Management | Canada, Ontario | 14 December 2018 | — | — | |
| 77 | Toronto Tank Lines (TTL) | Specialty truckload | Canada, Ontario | 15 February 2019 | — | — | |
| 78 | Schilli Corporation | Specialty truckload | USA, Missouri | 22 February 2019 | — | Independent subsidiary; Renamed Bulk Transport Co. East (BTC East) in September, 2019 | |
| 79 | Les Services JAG | Specialty truckload | Canada, Quebec | 19 March 2019 | — | — | |
| 80 | Aulick Leasing Corp. (Note: TFI did not acquire Aulick Leasing's other subsidiaries: Aulick Industries, Aulick Air, Tow-Aul & Recovery, and Stor-Aul.); ShirAul | Specialty truckload; Equipment manufacture | USA, Scottsbluff, Nebraska | 1 April 2019 | — | Independent subsidiary later renamed Bulk Transport Co. West (BTC West) | |
| 81 | BeavEx; Guardian Medical Logistics; JNJW Enterprises; USXP | Final-mile delivery; Home delivery; Distribution | USA | 27 April 2019 | US$7.2 million | — | |
| 82 | Piston Tank Corporation | Specialty truckload | USA, Missouri | 14 June 2019 | — | Merged into BTC East | |
| 83 | AT Group US Logistics | Final-mile delivery; Logistics; Brokerage | USA, Georgia | 7 August 2019 | — | — | |
| 84 | Craler Inc. | Specialty truckload | Canada, Quebec | 22 August 2019 | — | — | |
| 85 | Division of R.R. Donnelley & Sons; DLS Worldwide | _row_countPL | USA, Bolingbrook, Illinois | 2 March 2020 | US$225 million | Independent subsidiary as TForce Worldwide; Later renamed TFWW | |
| 87 | Gusgo Transport; Seatainer Transport | Drayage; Specialized truckload | Canada, Toronto, Canada | 17 June 2020 | — | — | |
| 88 | Divisions of Comcar Industries; MCT Transportation; Coastal Transport; CCC Transportation | Specialty truckload; Logistics | USA, South Dakota; USA, Savannah, Georgia; USA, Florida | 25 June 2020; 26 June 2020; 8 September 2020 | US$34.6 million (Note: Total of US$34.6 million includes US$12.8 million for MCT, US$15 million for CT, and US$6.8 million for CCC. Each was completed as a separate transaction.) | Coastal and CCC merged into BTC East; MCT rebranded as CFI Temp-Control, a division of CFI | |
| 89 | Divisions of Comcar Industries; MCT Transportation; Coastal Transport; CCC Transportation | Specialty truckload; Logistics | USA, South Dakota; USA, Savannah, Georgia; USA, Florida | 25 June 2020; 26 June 2020; 8 September 2020 | US$34.6 million | Coastal and CCC merged into BTC East; MCT rebranded as CFI Temp-Control, a division of CFI | |
| 90 | Divisions of Comcar Industries; MCT Transportation; Coastal Transport; CCC Transportation | Specialty truckload; Logistics | USA, South Dakota; USA, Savannah, Georgia; USA, Florida | 25 June 2020; 26 June 2020; 8 September 2020 | US$34.6 million | Coastal and CCC merged into BTC East; MCT rebranded as CFI Temp-Control, a division of CFI | |
| 91 | DSN Chemical Transportation | Logistics | — | 16 July 2020 | — | — | |
| 92 | Keith Hall & Sons Transport Limited | Specialty truckload | Canada, Burford, Ontario | 31 July 2020 | — | Merged into Contrans Tank Group | |
| 93 | TBM Logistics | Specialty truckload | — | 18 September 2020 | — | — | |
| 94 | Desrosiers Transport | Specialty truckload | — | 1 October 2020 | — | — | |
| 95 | Division of Grammer Logistics; Grammer Dry Bulk | Logistics | USA, Bolingbrook, Illinois | October 2020 | — | Merged into BTC East | |
| 96 | Freightline Carrier Systems | Logistics | — | 31 October 2020 | — | — | |
| 97 | Excel Transportation Group | LTL | — | 29 November 2020 | — | — | |
| 98 | Fleetway Transport | Truckload | Canada, Brampton, Ontario | 1 February 2021 | — | Independent subsidiary | |
| 99 | Michel Charbonneau | Specialty truckload | — | January 2021 | — | Merged into Kingsway Bulk | |
| 100 | Transport Bergeron | Specialty truckload | — | January 2021 | — | Merged into Kingsway Bulk | |
| 101 | Division of UPS; UPS Freight | LTL; Truckload | USA, Richmond, Virginia | 30 April 2021 | US$800 million | Independent subsidiary as TForce Freight | |
| 102 | Procam International | LTL; Specialty truckload; 3PL; Warehousing | Canada, Laval, Quebec | 1 June 2021 | — | — | |
| 103 | SGT2000 | Truckload | Canada, Saint-Germain-de-Grantham, Quebec | October 2021 | — | — | |
| 104 | FreightLine Carrier Systems | — | — | 2021 | — | — | |
| 105 | Driving Force Decks | — | — | 2021 | — | — | |
| 106 | D&D Sexton | Specialty Truckload | USA, Carthage, Missouri | 29 November 2021 | — | Subsidiary of CFI | |

== Controversies ==
In August 2020, TFI's four Canadian courier subsidiaries, Canpar Express, ICS Courier, Loomis Express and TForce Integrated Solutions, were the victims of ransomware attacks. All four company websites were taken down by TFI for some time but TFI stated no customer data had been obtained by hackers. Subsequently, three internal documents from Canpar Express were leaked to the dark web. The source of the leak appeared to be hacking group DoppelPaymer. Following the attack, some Canpar customers reported shipping delays.
