= Con-way =

Former American multinational freight transportation and logistics company

Con-way, Inc.
- Formerly: Consolidated Truck Lines
- Company type: Public
- Traded as: NYSE: CNW
- Industry: Transportation; Distribution
- Founded: 1929
- Founder: Leland James
- Defunct: May 9, 2017
- Headquarters: Ann Arbor Charter Township, Michigan
- Key people: Douglas W. Stotlar (president & CEO)
- Products: LTL shipping; Truckload shipping; Warehousing; Logistics services; Supply-chain management
- Revenue: ▲US$5,806 million (2014)
- Operating income: ▲US$268 million (2014)
- Net income: ▲US$137 million (2014)
- Total assets: ▲US$3,336 million (2014)
- Number of employees: 30,100 (2014)
- Subsidiaries: Con-way Freight; Menlo Worldwide Logistics; Con-way Truckload
- Website: con-way.com

Con-way, Inc. (NYSE: CNW) was an American multinational freight transportation and logistics company headquartered in Ann Arbor, Michigan, United States. With annual revenues of $5.5 billion, Con-way was the second largest less-than-truckload transport provider in North America, with additional operations for global contract logistics, managed transportation, truckload and freight brokerage. The company's services were sold through its primary operating companies of Con-way Freight, Con-way Truckload and Menlo Worldwide. These operating units provided less-than-truckload (LTL), full truckload and multimodal freight transportation, as well as logistics, warehousing and supply chain management services. Con-way, Inc. and its subsidiaries operated from more than 500 locations across North America and in 20 countries.

The company was known as Consolidated Freightways, Inc. until 1996 when it spun off its long-haul trucking subsidiaries, CF MotorFreight and four others, into a separate, independent company which took the name Consolidated Freightways Corporation. The parent company was renamed CNF Transportation Inc. at the time of the split and retained a set of LTL subsidiaries which had been operating under the name Con-way as well as its other logistics and freight forwarding subsidiaries. The spinoff long-haul business, Consolidated Freightways Corporation, filed for Chapter 11 bankruptcy on September 3, 2002, and ceased operations.

In 2006, CNF rebranded itself Con-way, Inc. On September 9, 2015, it announced it was being acquired by XPO, Inc. The sale was completed on October 30, 2015 and the Con-way brand had been retired by May 9, 2017.

== History ==
Con-way's heritage dated from 1929, when industry pioneer Leland James founded an intercity trucking company in Portland, Oregon. Initially named Consolidated Truck Lines, the company grew from a one-truck operation into one of the largest long-haul carriers in the United States by the early 1980s, and became one of the few freight transportation firms to originate in the West and successfully expand eastward. Consolidated headquarters were moved to the San Francisco Bay Area in the 1950s.

In 1996, Consolidated's unionized long-haul trucking company, CF MotorFreight, was spun off as Consolidated Freightways, Inc., creating two separate publicly traded companies. Consolidated Freightways, Inc. was renamed CNF Transportation, Inc., reflecting the familiar stock ticker symbol of the company (CNF).

Consolidated Freightways Corporation filed for Chapter 11 bankruptcy on September 3, 2002, and ceased operations.

In 2006, the CNF Transportation changed its name to Con-way, Inc, and the company's NYSE stock ticker was changed from CNF to CNW.

In 2007, Con-way acquired Contract Freighters, Inc. (CFI), a privately held North American truckload carrier based in Joplin, Missouri, in a transaction valued at $750 million. Founded in 1951, CFI operated more than 2,600 tractors and more than 7,000 trailers, with more than 3,000 employees including approximately 2,500 drivers that serve customers throughout North America.

Con-way moved its headquarters from San Mateo, California to Ann Arbor, Michigan in 2011.

On September 9, 2015, Con-way announced it was being acquired by XPO, Inc., and the sale was completed on October 30, 2015.

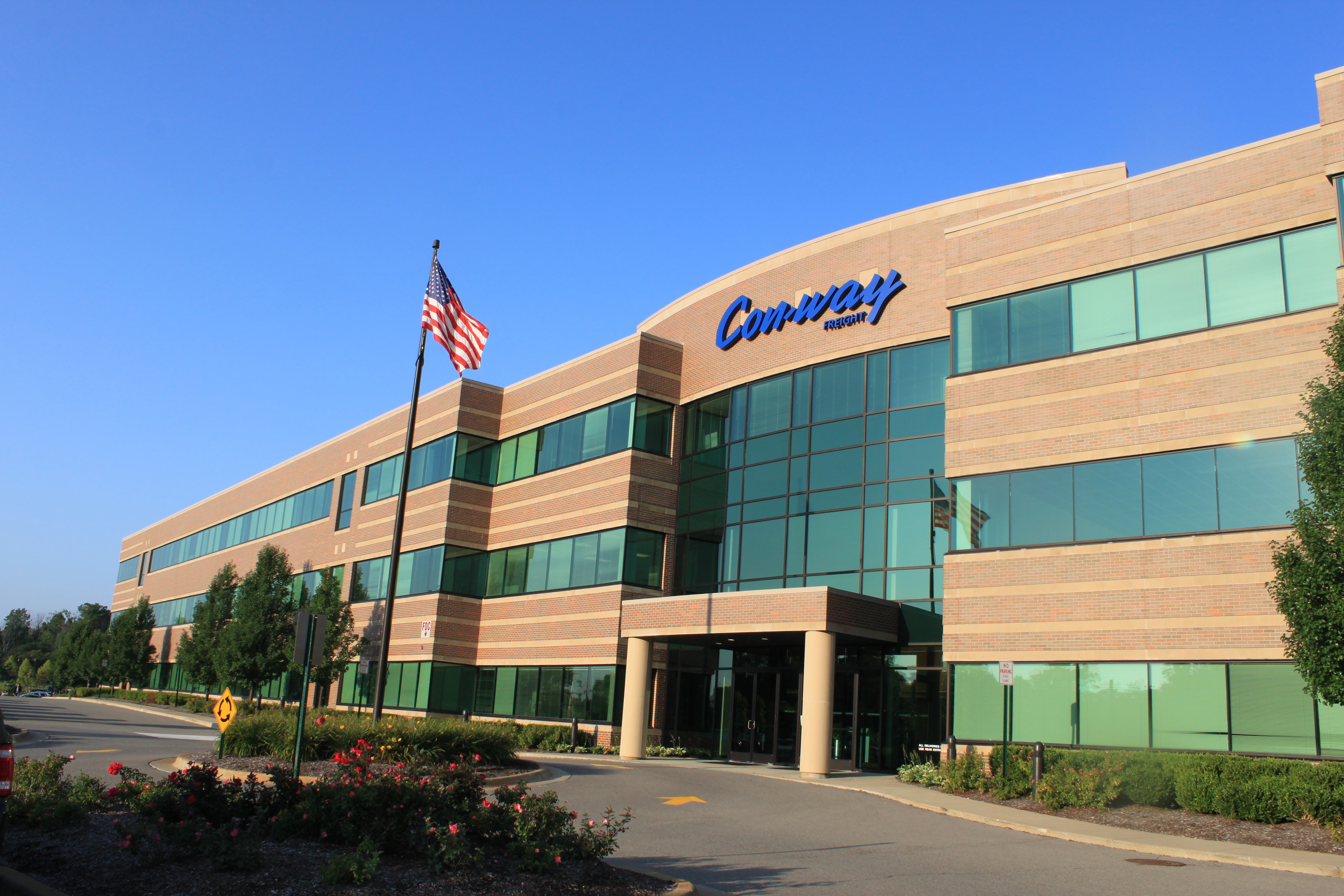
Con-Way Freight's Headquarters in Ann Arbor, Michigan

== Company structure ==
Con-way, Inc. was the parent company for five wholly owned subsidiaries:

=== Con-way Freight ===
Con-way freight provided less-than-truckload service across North America.

=== Con-way Truckload ===
Con-way Truckload, since acquired by TFI International in 2016 renamed Contract Freighters, Inc. (CFI), provided full truckload shipping across the United States, Mexico and Canada.

=== Con-way Enterprise Services ===
Con-way Enterprise Services was the administrative and information technology division of Con-way, Inc., and was based in Portland, Oregon.

=== Menlo Worldwide Logistics ===
Menlo Worldwide Logistics designed and implemented logistics solutions across the globe.

=== Con-way Manufacturing ===
Con-way Manufacturing, formerly Road Systems, Inc., was a trailer refurbishing and manufacturing company that supplied trailing equipment to the company’s trucking fleets.
