= Menlo Logistics =

- Company type: Subsidiary
- Industry: Logistics
- Headquarters: San Francisco, California
- Key people: Robert Bianco, President Gary Kowalski, Senior VP - Chief Operating Officer Bob Bassett, VP, Sales and Marketing
- Revenue: ▲US$ 1.72 billion (2014)
- Operating income: ▲US$ 27 million (2014)
- Parent: XPO, Inc.
- Website: www.xpo.com

Menlo Logistics was a global supply chain company operating in 20 countries on five continents. Its core business offerings included third-party logistics and supply chain management, and the company specialized in the integration of all functions across the supply chain. The company operated 210 locations worldwide and had 18,000,000 square feet (1,700,000 m^{2}) of warehouse capacity.

It was a business unit of Con-way, which was acquired in 2015 by XPO, Inc. Sister companies included Con-way Freight, Con-way Truckload, and Con-way Multimodal.

== History ==
The idea for Menlo Logistics was developed in the late 1980s. At that time, CF Inc.’s director of marketing, John Williford, presented the idea for the company's creation — an organization that offered warehouse, inventory, and transportation management as well as full integration of supply chain links through customized systems and software — to upper management. The initial business plan was to create, implement, and manage logistics projects for its customers.

On October 26, 1990, Menlo Logistics Inc. was formed. The name was a deliberate choice to prompt an association with California’s Menlo Park, which was well known as the home of venture capitalists and high-tech industries.

Menlo Logistics established itself as a third-party logistics provider in the 1990s, and rode the popularity of the outsourcing trend by notching double-digit growth every year during that era. One of Menlo’s early success stories was its successful bid on a $100 million distribution contract with Sears. The department store wanted to close its internal distribution system, which cost Sears about twice as much as its competitors at 7 percent of its sales.

A map showing Menlo's current warehousing facilities

In December 2000, Menlo Logistics collaborated with General Motors to create Vector SCM, a new global supply chain management company serving the automotive industry.

Effective January 1, 2002, Con-Way formed Menlo Worldwide Logistics by renaming Menlo Logistics and combining it with Vector SCM and the freight forwarding operations of Emery Worldwide (initially renamed Emery Forwarding and later renamed Menlo Worldwide Forwarding). Menlo Worldwide Logistics absorbed the operations of Emery’s logistics unit, Emery Global Logistics (EGL). The EGL operations gave Menlo Worldwide Logistics presence in Asia and South America, and expanded its European scope. The company began leveraging these operations to pursue organic growth outside of North America and grow its European footprint.

In December 2004, Con-Way sold Menlo Worldwide Forwarding to United Parcel Service, and Con-Way streamlined its operating units by merging Con-Way Transportation Service’s logistics unit, Con-way Logistics, into Menlo Worldwide Logistics. This completed the rationalization of three logistics entities into a single business unit. In 2006, GM exercised its right to purchase Menlo Logistics' interest in Vector SCM, and the sale was completed in December.

In seeking to grow its business in the Asian logistics market, Menlo purchased two Asian logistics companies, Cougar Holdings Pte, Ltd. and Chic Holdings, Ltd. in 2007. Singapore-based Cougar enlarged Menlo's operational scope in southeastern Asia, and Shanghai-based Chic significantly expanded Menlo's presence in China.

In October 2015 Menlo Logistics and its parent Con-Way were acquired by XPO, Inc.

A Menlo Logistics warehouse facility in Singapore
