= TST-CF Express =

Canadian less than truckload transportation company

TST Solutions L.P.
- Logo of TST-CF Express since 2020
- Trade name: TST-CF Express
- Formerly: Woodstock Transport (1928–1935); Schell Transport Limited (1935–1950); The Overland Express Ltd. (1950–1972); Overland-Western Ltd. (1972–1987); TNT Overland Express (1987–1997); TST Overland Express (1997–2020)
- Company type: Subsidiary
- Industry: Transportation
- Founded: 1928; 98 years ago in Woodstock, Ontario, Canada
- Founder: Samuel Axelrod
- Headquarters: Mississauga, Ontario, Canada
- Key people: Wayne Gruszka (President)
- Number of employees: 1,095
- Parent: TNT-Alltrans (1973–1997); TFI International (2000–present)
- Subsidiaries: TST Truckload; TST Expedited Services
- Website: tst-cfexpress.com

TST Solutions L.P. (doing business as TST-CF Express) is a Canadian less than truckload (LTL) freight carrier located in Mississauga, Ontario, Canada. TST-CF offers nationwide Canadian service and partners with US-based LTL carrier Saia to provide international services to and from the United States. TST-CF Express is a subsidiary of TFI International, a Canadian transportation conglomerate and Canada's largest LTL business and trucking fleet. TST-CF Express was the result of the 2020 merger of two TFI subsidiaries: TST Overland Express and Canadian Freightways.

== Company ==
TFI International is a Canadian transport and logistics company based in Montreal, Quebec. It operates across Canada through 4 business segments. Its trucking fleet consists of 6700 power units and 12000 trailers. Two thirds of its business comes from operations in Eastern Canada while the rest is from Western Canada.

The company's main source of growth has been complete takeovers (it holds no stakes in other companies) of smaller trucking companies (35 since 1992) which are then made into subsidiaries, though more recently organic growth contributed to the 53% rise in freight in the first half of 2010. In December 2010 Transforce will enter the US market when it agreed in principle to purchase Dallas based Dynamex with a $248 million takeover offer. In the 12 months leading up to October 31, 2010, Dynamex made $418 million in revenue (about a quarter as much as Transforce).

The company has 1,685 Power and Trailing equipment and covers 10 Canadian Provinces and 50 U.S. States

== History ==
- 1928 – the organization was founded as Woodstock Transport by Samuel Axelrod operating between Woodstock and Toronto, Ontario.
- 1935 – interests purchased by Norman C. Schell of Woodstock, Ontario and the name changed to Schell Transport Limited.
- 1945 Interests purchased by Robert G. Thompson, Toronto.
- 1950 The name of the company was changed from Schell Transport to “The Overland Express Ltd.”
- 1951 Interests purchased by Robert D. Grant and Associates, Toronto, Ontario. Mr. Thompson continued as president, while Mr. Grant took over the position of General Manager.
- 1954 The Overland Express, along with Consolidated Truck Lines were the first carriers to bring “In-Bond” freight into the Mid-continent Sufferance Warehouse on The Queensway in Toronto.
- 1956 Overland Express purchased Reid Transport, who operated between the Windsor-Detroit, and Sarnia-Port Huron, thus establishing its first U.S. operations.
- 1957 After a lengthy and costly Interstate Commerce Commission (I.C.C.) hearing, Overland Express was granted operating authority between Ontario and Buffalo, New York.
- 1963 Mulles Transport was purchased, extending the operating territory north of Toronto into the town of Brampton.
- 1964 Overland took delivery of its first “computer” at its Head Office in Woodstock, Ontario. It was Remington-Rand Card Reader, tabulating machine.
- 1970 Wood's Transport & Cartage (Oshawa) Ltd. was purchased, extending the operating authority east out of Toronto into Oshawa.
- 1971 Overland was again on the move. This time it was to Maingate Drive in a new industrial area in northeast Mississauga – the site of its existing Toronto terminal.
- 1972 In a major takeover, Overland purchased Western Freight Lines Ltd. of Chatham, Ontario – one of its largest direct competitors in the southwest Ontario market. The two companies merged operations, and the name was changed to Overland-Western Limited.
- 1973 TNT-Alltrans of Sydney, Australia acquired Overland-Western through a purchase of it shares.
- 1982 On May 14, 1982, “OLEX” was introduced to service, emergency LTL shipments, on an expedited door-to-door basis, in small vans, and straight trucks. TNT Overland Express opens the back door for its first direct service (“BONDLINER”) program out of Chicago, Illinois.
- 1983 The second “BONDLINER” market was opened in Ohio. In July, 1983 Overland Express, in a joint project with U.S. Customs and General Motors, was the first Canadian motor carrier to electronically transmit customs clearance data via the U.S. Customs “ACCEPT” system, which facilitated virtual “pre-clearance” of parts from Canadian vendors destined to General Motors manufacturing facilities in the U.S.
- 1984 It was decided that the company slipped in the back door just in time, so J.I.T. Inc. was formed to meet Just-In-Time inventory demands in the international and U.S. domestic markets. A third major “BONDLINER” program was launched between the U.S. Eastern Seaboard and southern Ontario.
- 1985 Overland acquired Dominion-Consolidated Truck Lines.
- 1986 In January, another “BONDLINER” was successfully launched this time linking the States of California, Arizona, and Nevada to Ontario and the rest of eastern Canada. In October, the “TEXAS BONDLINER” was successfully launched, this introduced Texas and western Louisiana to Overland's system.
- 1987 In March, TNT Overland Express acquired Robin Transport. On June 1, TNT Champlain Sept-Iles merged operations with Overland Express, creating TNT Overland Express, thereby extending Overland's coverage throughout the province of Quebec. At the time, TNT Overland Express claimed to be the largest auto parts carrier in Canada with General Motors of Canada as its largest customer. In addition to the parent brand, the carrier comprised four subsidiaries: Just-In-Time, Olex, Taxi Truck, and Robin.
- 1988 Overland signed partnership with Red Star.
- 1996 TNT Overland Express parent TNT is acquired by KPN
- 1997 Management buyout of the company from KPN
- 2000 Joins ExpressLink partnership with Lakeville Motor Express (LME), GI Trucking, and Estes Express Lines
- 2009 A recipient of the Schneider Logistics "Carriers of the Year" award
- 2009–2015 TST received the Lowe's Service Award each year. Including: platinum in 2009, platinum in 2010, gold in 2012, and gold in 2015.
- 2020 TST Overland Express merged with sibling TFI subsidiary Canadian Freightways to form TST-CF Express
