= Operational due diligence =

Operational due diligence (ODD) is a type of due diligence process by which a potential purchaser reviews the operational aspects of a target company during mergers and acquisitions, private equity investments, or capital raising. Its purpose is to ensure that the business model and operations of the target are suitable to the goals of the buyer.

== Process ==
The ODD review looks at the main operations of the target company and attempts to confirm (or not) that the business plan that has been provided is achievable with the existing operational facilities plus the capital expenditure that is outlined in the business plan. Additionally the ODD review will consider whether there is the potential for additional value to be wrought out of the target company by improving its operational function and also whether there are serious operational risks about which the potential buyer should be concerned (thereby allowing the buyer to consider aborting the deal or renegotiating the price). The approach for ODD varies by industry.

== Reviewers ==
An ODD review is often performed by a third party such as a professional services firm. Often the ODD is requested by the bank or other financier that is supporting the acquisition and is interested in the downside risks.

ODD activities are often focused on analyzing the supply chain, engineering, and manufacturing operations of a target acquisition in detail.

== Other types ==
ODD is only one form of due diligence. Others include:

- FDD, financial due diligence, where the target company's financial status is reviewed,
- CDD, commercial due diligence, where a target company's commercial status – the market position of its products and/or services – is reviewed,
- ITDD, IT due diligence, where a target company's IT environment is reviewed,
- ICDD, intellectual capital due diligence, where a company's intellectual capital is analyzed and assessed,
- HCDD, human capital due diligence, where a company's human capital is analyzed and assessed
- IDD, integrity due diligence, where a company's exposure to legal, corruption and regulatory risk is analyzed and assessed.

== See also ==
- Bolt-on acquisition
