= Con-way Freight =

Logistics company

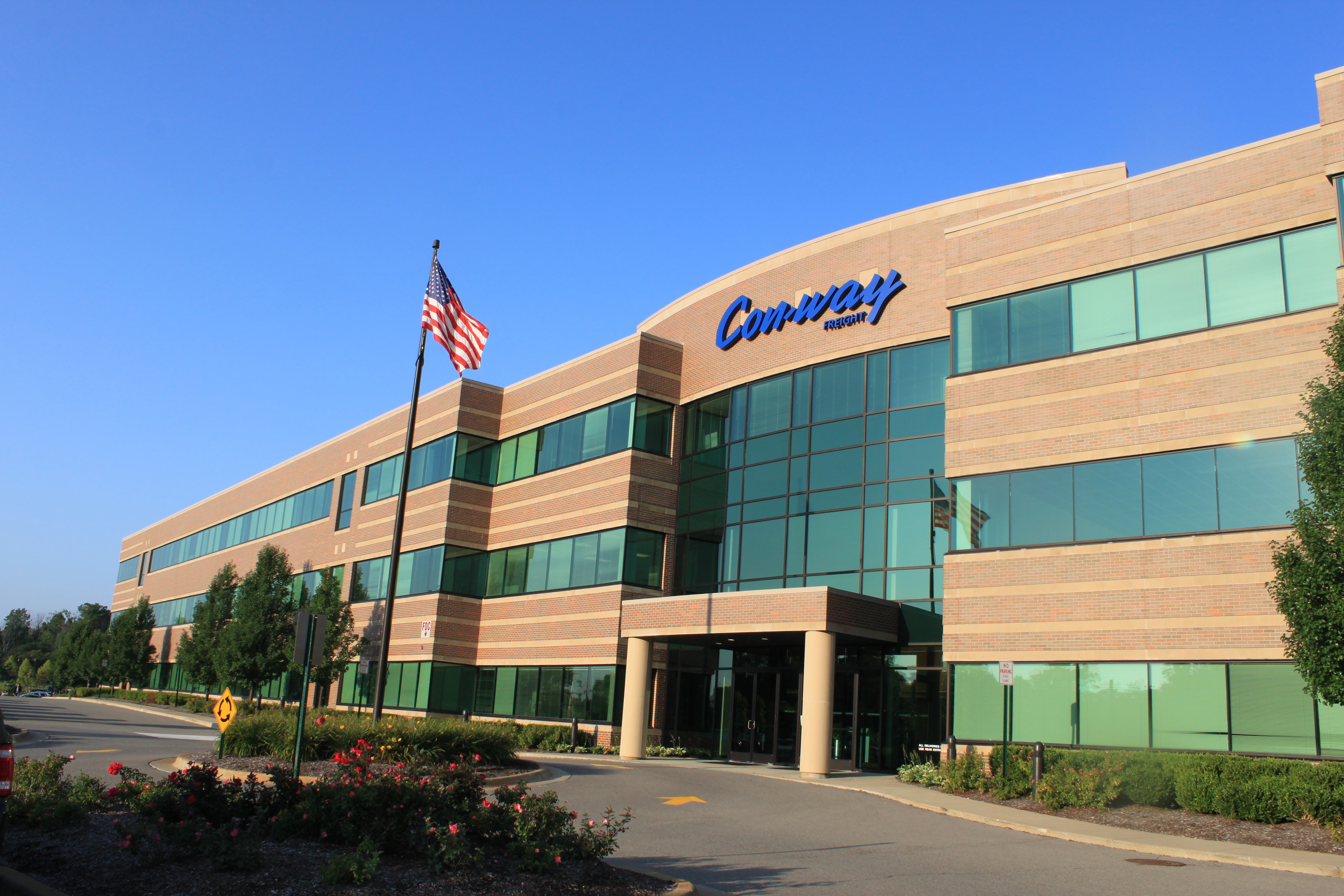
- Con-way headquarters building in Ann Arbor Charter Township, Michigan
- Type: Subsidiary
- Industry: Transportation
- Founded: 1983; 43 years ago
- Defunct: 2015
- Headquarters: Ann Arbor Charter Township, Michigan
- Revenue: ▲US$ 3.247 billion (2011)
- Operating income: ▲US$ 119.779 million (2011)
- Parent: Con-way, Inc.

Con-way Freight was a less-than-truckload (LTL) motor carrier headquartered in Ann Arbor, Michigan, utilizing a network of freight service centers to provide regional, inter-regional and transcontinental less-than-truckload freight services throughout North America. The business unit provided day-definite delivery service to manufacturing, industrial and retail customers. Con-way Freight was the largest division of Con-way, Inc. with 16,600 employees, more than 365 operating locations, 16,000 dock doors and 32,750 tractors and trailers. The company was founded by Consolidated Freightways (CF) of Portland, Oregon, as a non-union spinoff, for LTL hauling. In 2009, Con-way Freight reported revenues of over $2.6 billion. In 2015, Con-way Inc., including Con-way Freight and sibling company Con-way Truckload, was acquired by XPO, Inc., a primarily non-asset logistics company from Greenwich, Connecticut, in a deal worth $3.5 billion.

Con-way Freight originated in May 1983 with the launch of Con-way Western Express, with 11 service centers in three western states, followed one month later by the start of Con-way Central Express, with 11 locations in seven Midwest states.

Con-way was created to provide non-union, regional short-haul service in markets where CF wasn't actively selling its services. The regional companies Con-way Southern Express (CSE), Con-way Central Express (CCX), Con-way Western Express (CWX) and Con-way Eastern Express (CEX) were established as part of this strategy. On their first day of business the two carriers — which collectively began with 230 employees and 334 trucks, tractors and trailers - handled 113 shipments.

On September 9, 2015, Con-way Inc. (including Con-way Freight) was acquired by XPO, Inc. Roughly a year later, on October 27, 2016, XPO, Inc. completed the sale of Con-way Truckload, its recently acquired full-truckload division (3,000 tractors, 7,500 trailers, and 29 locations) from Con-way Freight to the Canadian based TFI International for $558 million in cash. By May 2017, XPO, Inc. reported that it had completed rebranding of Con-way to XPO, Inc. effectively marking the retirement of the brand.

== Operations ==
LTL carriers transport freight from multiple shippers utilizing a network of freight service centers, combined with a fleet of linehaul and pickup-and-delivery tractors and trailers. Freight is picked up from customers and consolidated for shipment at the originating service center. The freight is then loaded into trailers and transferred to the destination service center providing service to the delivery area. From the destination service center, the freight is delivered to the customer. Typically, LTL shipments weigh between 150 and 25,000 pounds. In 2008, Con-way Freight’s average weight per shipment was 1,190 pounds.

== Network Re-Engineering ==
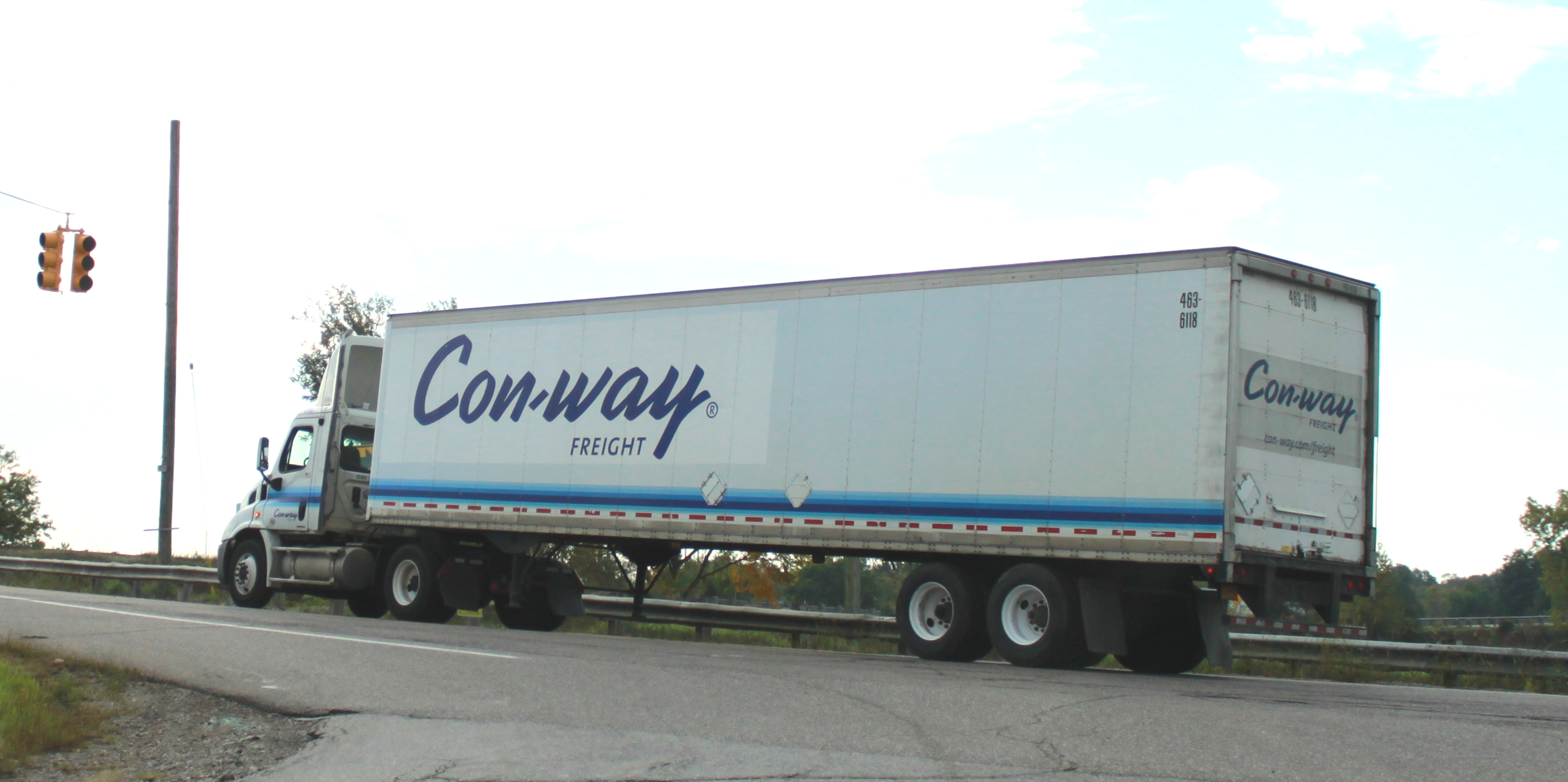
Con-way Freight truck Whitmore Lake, Michigan

Following the integration of the four regional component companies of Con-way Freight into a consolidated single network in 2007, the firm completed a major network re-engineering to improve service, without changing Con-way Freight’s service coverage.

== NTDC Standings ==
Con-way Freight has always had a strong presence at the National Truck Driving Championships. In 2010, the company sent a record 92 drivers to the competition and for the past two years Con-way Freight took home the title of Grand Champion. In 2009, Dale Duncan was named Grand Champion and, in 2010, Carl Krites took home the title. Chris Poynor also won the National championships competing in the Twins Division in 2016 and in 2017.

To qualify for U.S. state and national competitions, drivers must have maintained an accident-free driving record for the previous year. At the national competition, drivers face testing in three areas: a timed written exam, a pre-trip inspection test and a driving skills test. Each driver competes in one of nine equipment classes: 3-Axle, 4-Axle, 5-Axle, 5-Axle Flatbed, 5-Axle Sleeper, Step Van, Straight Truck, Tankers and Twins.
