= Saia =

American freight company

Saia, Inc.

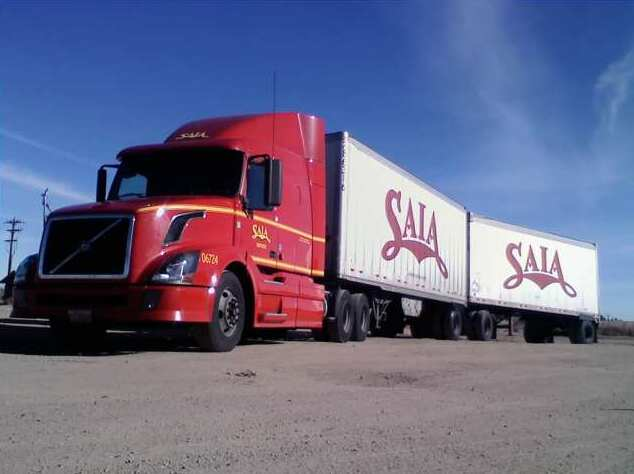
- Early 2000s Saia truck and trailers
- Type: Public
- Traded as: Nasdaq: SAIA; S&P 400 component
- ISIN: US78709Y1055
- Industry: Transportation
- Founded: 1924; 102 years ago in Houma, Louisiana, U.S.
- Founder: Louis Saia Sr.
- Headquarters: Johns Creek, Georgia, U.S.
- Number of locations: 3 general offices; 84 owned service facilities; 90 leased service facilities; (2020)
- Area served: Contiguous US direct; AK, HI, PR, Canada, and Mexico via partners
- Key people: Frederick J. Holzgrefe, III (president & CEO); Douglas L. Col (EVP & CFO); Raymond R. Ramu (EVP & Chief Customer Officer); Stephanie R. Maschmeier (VP & Chief Accounting Officer)
- Revenue: ▲US$3.23 billion (2025)
- Operating income: ▼US$352 million (2025)
- Net income: ▼US$255 million (2025)
- Total assets: ▲US$3.48 billion (2025)
- Total equity: ▲US$2.58 billion (2025)
- Number of employees: 10,600 (2020)
- Parent: Preston Trucking (1987–1993); Yellow Corporation (1993–2002); SCST (2002–2006)
- Subsidiaries: Saia LTL Freight; LinkEx; Saia Logistics Services
- Website: saia.com

Saia is an American less-than-truckload (LTL) trucking company that originated in Houma, Louisiana, in 1924. With original operation occurring in Louisiana and Texas for the first fifty years, expansion came after 1980 when coverage began reaching into more states in the South. Further expansion happened through mergers with other companies, which allowed Saia to provide service for thirty six states. Saia ranks in the top ten of LTL carriers in the United States, with revenues of over $1.8 billion in 2020.

== History ==
=== Foundation and expansion ===
Saia began in 1924 in Houma, Louisiana by Louis Saia Sr. Louis was a produce dealer who realized that there was more success in delivering produce rather than selling it. The first truck operated by the company was Saia’s car with the rear seats removed.

By 1970, Saia expanded and established terminals in Texas and Louisiana. Saia became one of the largest regional LTL carriers in the United States with 23 terminals throughout the Southeastern United States and revenue exceeding $50 million.

=== Subsidiary of Preston and Yellow ===
The Saia family sold Saia to Preston Trucking in 1987.

The Yellow Corporation purchased Preston Trucking, along with subsidiaries Saia & Smalley, in 1993. In 1995 Saia merged with Smalley Transportation resulting in the establishment of terminals in North Carolina, South Carolina and western Texas.

=== Resumed independence ===
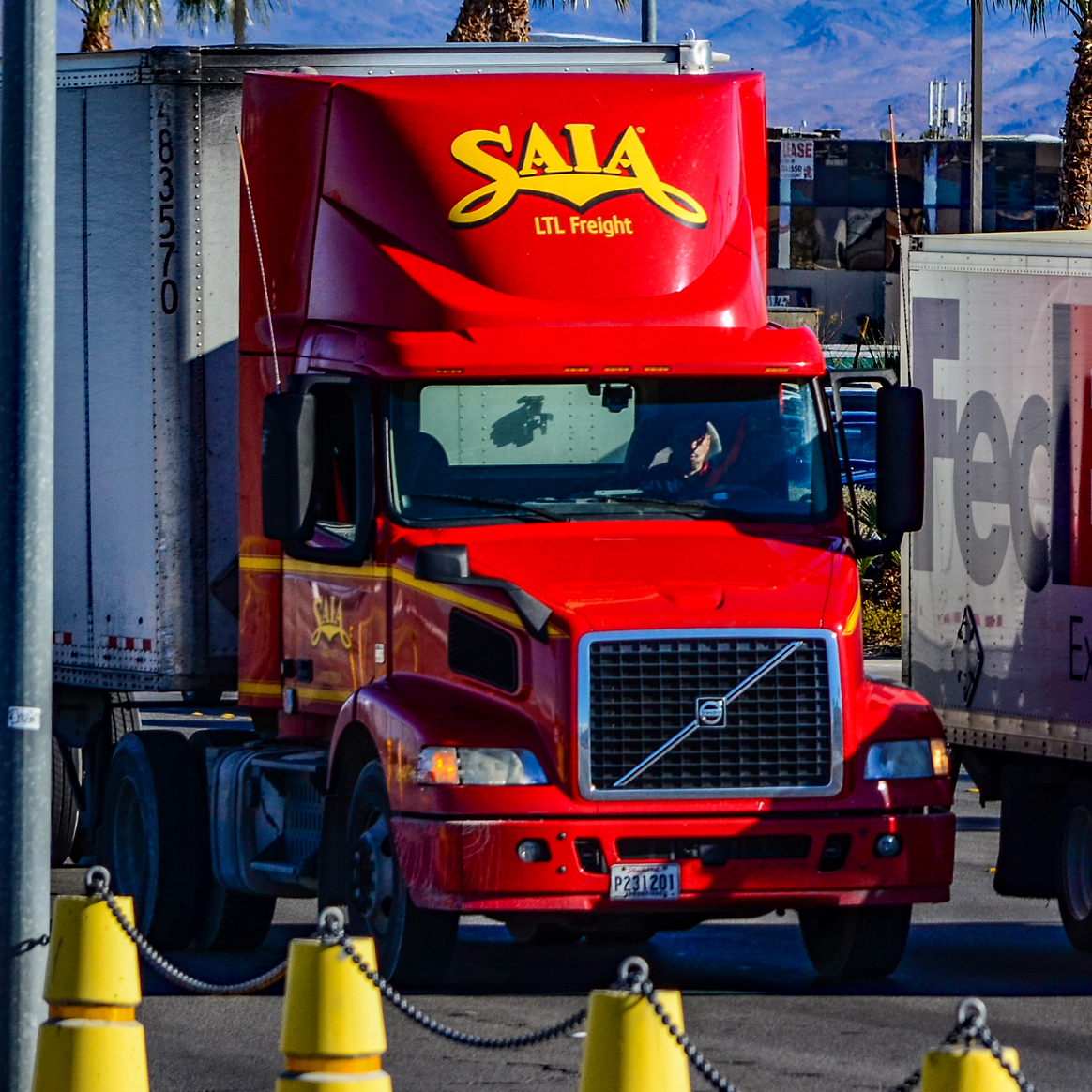
Saia truck at Harry Reid International Airport, Las Vegas, Nevada in 2019

In 2002 Saia and Delanco, New Jersey-based Jevic Transportation, another Yellow Corporation subsidiary, spun off to form an independent publicly traded company called SCS Transportation (SCS). Clark Brothers Transport, Inc. was acquired in 2004 incorporating its nine-state, sixteen-terminal operations into Saia.

In 2006, SCS sold Jevic to a Sun Capital Partners affiliate for $40 million. The sale came after years of low profitability at Jevic and allowed SCS to focus on its more successful Saia unit. Along with the sale, SCS announced plans to rebrand the parent company to Saia and move its corporate headquarters from Kansas City, Missouri to Saia's headquarters in Duluth, Georgia. Saia president Rick O'Dell would become president, CEO, and a board member of the parent company with former chairman and CEO, Bert Trucksess, transitioning to non-executive chairman. Jevic, originally founded in 1981 by Harry Mulschlegel, would shut down in 2008 after being unable to improve its fortunes as an independent company.

Saia began trading on the NASDAQ with the symbol SAIA.

=== Expansion via acquisitions ===
Saia expanded further with the acquisitions of two LTL carriers: Columbus, Ohio–based The Connection Company in 2006 and Madison Freight Systems (MFS) of Waunakee, Wisconsin in 2007.

Saia acquired Robart Transportation (and subsidiary The RL Services Group) in 2012 for approximately $7.8 million. Robart, founded in 1981 in Duluth, Georgia, was a non-asset truckload and brokerage service provider while The RL Services Group focused on supply chain, logistics, data mining, and operations analysis and related services. The acquisition of Robart, which Saia planned to rebrand under the Saia name, marked Saia's first significant move into non-asset logistics services.

In 2015, Saia acquired Dallas-based third-party logistics provider LinkEx for $25 million. LinkEx was founded in 2002 as a non asset–based intermodal logistics management company, providing services and technology for management of international and domestic shipments. After the LinkEx purchase, Saia's previous non-asset acquisition, Robart, was merged into LinkEx which continued operations as a wholly owned subsidiary of Saia with offices in Dallas, Atlanta, and Guadalajara, Mexico.

In December 2023, Saia acquired 17 terminals of former parent company Yellow Corporation in the Chapter 11 bankruptcy sale for $235.7 million.

== Operations ==
Saia has 194 terminals and serves the 48 states in the contiguous United States directly. It also serves Alaska, Hawaii, Puerto Rico, Mexico, and Canada via a network of partners. The three operating service groups of Saia are Saia LTL Freight, Saia Logistics Service, and LinkEx. Saia has over 13,000 employees and handles over 30,000 shipments per day as of 2023.

In 2017, Saia partnered with TST Overland Express, now TST-CF Express to provide cross border shipments into Canada. Saia provides the equivalent service for TST.

In 2025, they connected more than 10,000 security assets onto one platform by SecuriThings.
