= Consolidated Freightways =

Former American trucking and logistics company

- Formerly: Consolidated Truck Lines
- Type: Public
- Industry: Transportation; Distribution
- Founded: April 1, 1929; 97 years ago in Portland, Oregon
- Founder: Leland James
- Defunct: September 2002
- Fate: Chapter 11 bankruptcy
- Successor: Con-way
- Number of locations: Portland, Oregon; Vancouver, Washington
- Services: LTL shipping; Logistics

Consolidated Freightways (CF) was an American multinational less-than-truckload (LTL) freight service and logistics company founded on April 1, 1929, in Portland, Oregon, and later relocated to Vancouver, Washington. Affectionately known as "CornFlakes", Consolidated Freightways was also the founder of the Freightliner line of heavy trucks, now owned by Daimler Trucks. At its height, the company possessed over 350 terminals, employing more than 15,000 truck drivers, dock workers, dispatchers and management. Consolidated Freightways was once the nation's number one long-haul trucking company and the 3rd largest-ever US bankruptcy filing, ceasing business in 2002.

== History ==
=== Foundation and early history ===
Consolidated Freightways was founded on April 1, 1929 by Leland James in Portland, Oregon. Originally a single truck LTL operation, in the early days James combined four local short-haul carriers in the Portland area into a single carrier. At the beginning, the company primarily focused on the Portland area before expanding into the region.

James was an innovator focused on improving the product capacity of his truck and trailer combinations. Length laws were stringent in the 1930s, so if a company were to survive they had to be innovative. James purchased his custom power units from Freightways Manufacturing Company and helped to design the first Cab Over Engine (COE) power units used in the US. These COE power units were lightweight and short, allowing for an additional freight box mounted on the frame of the truck behind the cab for single trailer units. Shorter COE units without the frame-mounted freight box could haul longer than normal short trailers hitched as doubles. Both of these configurations allowed each combination to haul more freight than standard configurations.

These innovations in truck and trailer design and configuration led to CF founding Freightways Manufacturing in 1939. It was later re-branded as Freightliner Manufacturing. Over the subsequent years, CF acquired additional manufacturing companies including railroad equipment manufacturer Transicold Corporation and glass fiber product manufacturer Technic-Glas Corporation.

In the late 1930s, CF began serving the Northwest US region and down the West coast into California but by the late 1940s had routes as far east as Chicago. The company operated about 1,600 pieces of equipment by 1950 with revenues of US$24 million. The company went public in November 1951, opening on the New York Stock Exchange at $1.80.

Under strict regulation in the 1950s, CF grew primarily through acquiring smaller competitors, totaling 53 by the end of the decade. This was carried out under the leadership of CF president Jack Snead who took the position in 1955. By 1959, the company was the largest common carrier in the US with revenues of US$146 million and almost 11,000 employees. Its operations covered 34 states plus Canada and included 13,800 pieces of equipment.

=== Restructuring and refocus ===
Following a half-decade of expansion through acquisitions, most of which were not integrated with one another, the company's financials were unstable and it reported a US$2.7 million loss for 1960. This led to a change in leadership at CF with William White replacing Snead as president in 1960. Under White's leadership, CF underwent restructuring or sale of many of the company's subsidiaries, including a small parcel company, with the goal of restoring the company's focus and centralizing management.

These moves resulted in a turnaround in financial performance and by 1969 the company had US$451 million in revenue.

CF created specialized truckload division, CF Arrowhead, in 1980 based in Menlo Park CA. This subsidiary was a union owner-operator company with specialized trailers, such as flat beds, drop decks and heavy haul, to service their existing customers with freight that couldn't be transported in CF's van trailers.

By 1981, the company's stock was valued at $38.00/share. Also in 1981, CF won a case before the U.S. Supreme Court, Kassel v. Consolidated Freightways Corp. The court found that Iowa's length restriction on tractor-trailers violated the Dormant Commerce Clause.

CF ventured into regional trucking in 1983 with its Con-Way carriers. Consolidated Freightways' drivers and dockworkers were unionized, and the new Con-Way companies (Con-way Central Express (CCX), Con-way Western Express (CWX), Con-way Eastern Express (CEX), etc.) were nonunion, creating tense relations with CF's Teamsters. CEX was the former Penn-Yan Express, and was union, but Conway dissolved the company and later allowed CCX to assume its routes, thereby eliminating all union affiliation with the company.

=== CF Airfreight and Emery Worldwide ===
In 1970, the Civil Aeronautics Board (CAB), a now-defunct Federal agency that, at the time, tightly regulated the almost all US commercial aviation, allowed CF subsidiary CF Airfreight to engage in air freight forwarding. The CAB had authority over air freight forwarders as so-called indirect air carriers. The US domestic air cargo market was deregulated at the end of 1977 by the Air Cargo Deregulation Act. The next year, CF Airfreight had grown to become the 10th largest US air freight forwarder. In 1983, CF agreed to buy Air Express International (AEI), a large internationally-oriented air freight forwarder in a deal that would have more than tripled the size of CF's air freight business. However, the deal fell apart later that year, in part because organized crime (which controlled New York City unions) attempted to extort money from AEI to permit the deal to go through.

CF Airfreight tried a number of approaches to obtaining domestic air freight capacity. The first was Eastern Air Lines, the so-called Moonlight Special, where Eastern flew Airbus A300 aircraft on night flights with the underfloor cargo capacity dedicated to CF. Passengers were allowed carry-on baggage only and connection time in the Houston hub was 90 minutes. The program ran April 1985 to March 1987 and peaked at 12 A300s, ending because CF wanted to move the hub from Houston to Indianapolis, unacceptable to Eastern. CF replaced Eastern by contracting with freight airlines to fly into its Indianpolis hub. By early 1989, CF Airfreight had 15 large commercial aircraft flown by six contractors.

On April 3, 1989, CF purchased Emery Air Freight Corp. dba Emery Worldwide and its subsidiary Purolator Courier Corporation. CF merged its pre-existing air freight operation, CF Airfreight, into Emery. This division was union. However, Purolator carried significant debt meaning Emery as a whole was losing almost US$1 million a day at the time of acquisition. At the same time, CF Airfreight bought a small freight airline and used it for the foundation for its own airline, Emery Worldwide Airlines.

By the early 1990s, the Con-way companies were doing well, representing about US$600 million of CF's revenue, and CF's long-haul operation, CF MotorFreight, was successful as well. However, they were dragged down by Emery leading CF to a company-wide loss of US$41 million with a debt load of US$614 million in 1990.

As it had in the 1960's, CF again put in place new management and restructured and refocused the company in the early 1990s, this time with specific attention to the Emery division. The changes, including a complete restructure of Emery's overnight service, were successful at bringing Emery to a better financial position and by 1995 it was the most profitable company in the air freight industry.

=== Company split ===
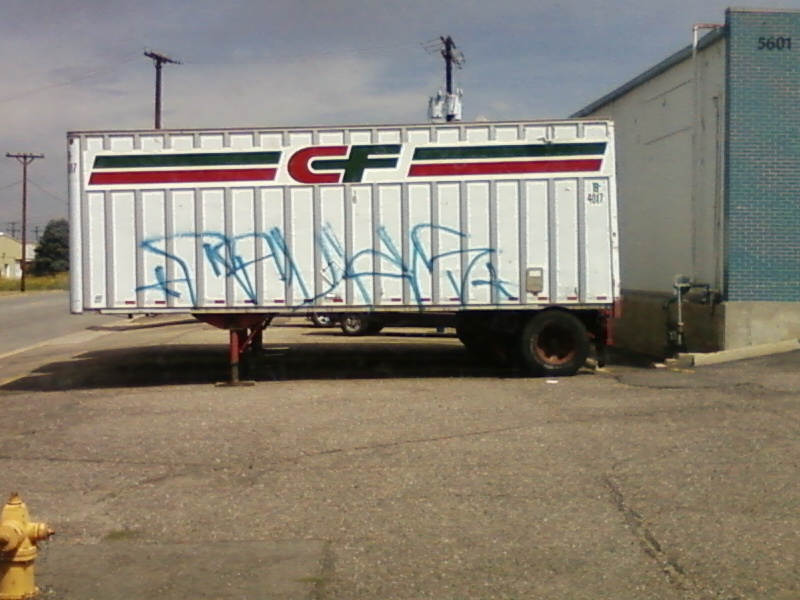
A defaced Consolidated Freightways trailer

In 1996, Consolidated Freightways, Inc. spun off its unionized long-haul trucking business, CF MotorFreight and four other long-haul subsidiaries, from its non-union LTL operations and related businesses creating two separate publicly traded companies. The long-haul group was renamed Consolidated Freightways Corporation and the former parent company, Consolidated Freightways, Inc., was renamed CNF Transportation Inc. The name was chosen to reflect the company's long-time stock ticker symbol, CNF.

CNF retained the Con-Way regional LTL companies, Emery Worldwide, and the growing logistics business, Menlo Logistics. The spinoff long-haul trucking company, now called Consolidated Freightways Corporation, filed for Chapter 11 bankruptcy on September 3, 2002, and ceased operations.

Due to poor fleet maintenance, Emery Worldwide Airlines ceased operations in December, 2001. The next year Emery Worldwide’s freight forwarding operations were rebranded as Menlo Worldwide Forwarding, and Emery Global Logistics was absorbed into Menlo Logistics. Menlo Worldwide Forwarding was sold to UPS in 2004.

On April 18, 2006, CNF Transportation re-branded itself under a new name, Con-Way, and remained in operation until October 30, 2015, when they were acquired by Greenwich, Connecticut-based XPO, Inc.

== Subsidiaries ==
=== Freightliner ===
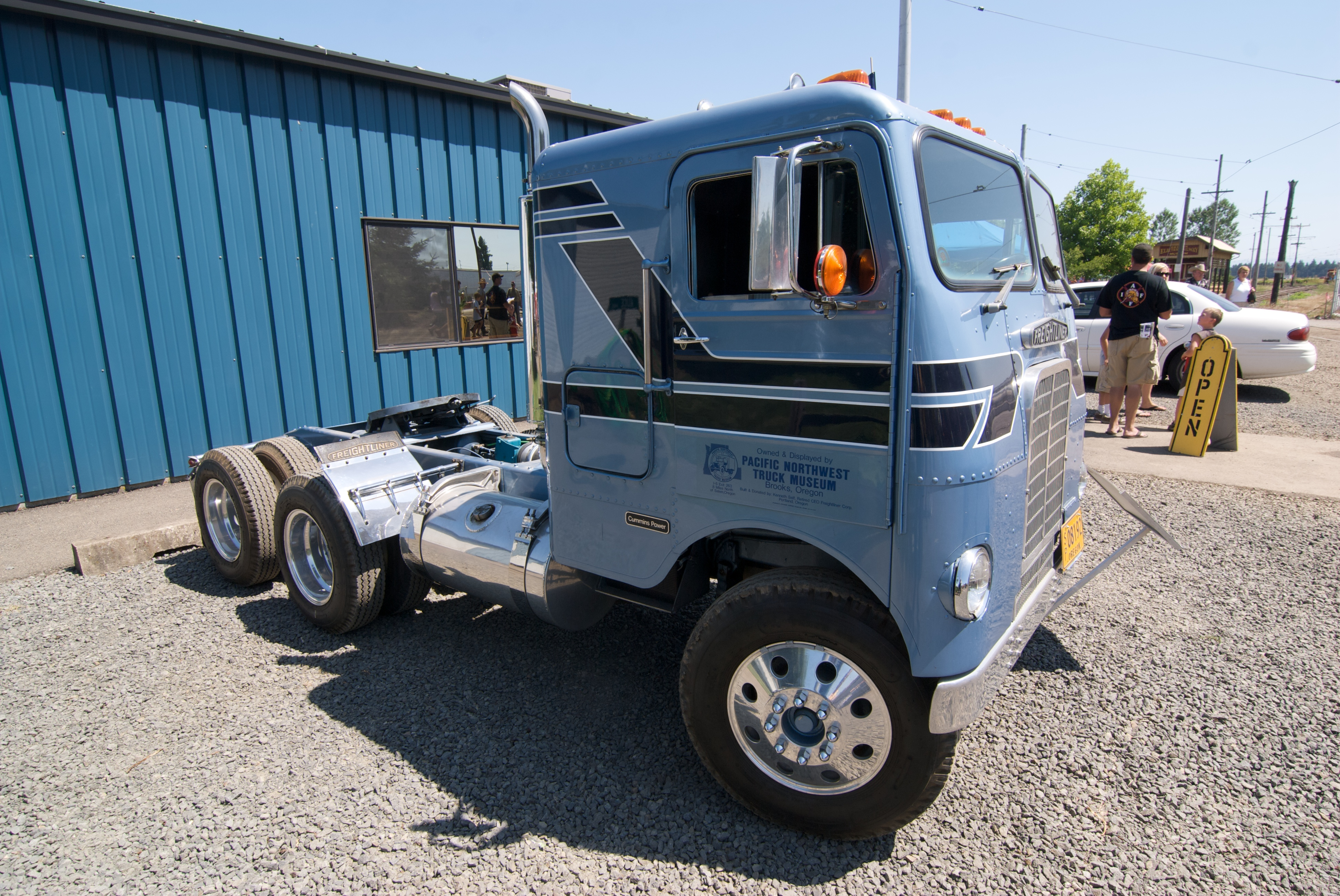
A White/Freightliner truck

Freightliner Manufacturing, founded by CF as Freightways Manufacturing in 1939 was a key to CF's early success. To begin with, Freightliner only built equipment for CF but in 1951 the company contracted Ohio-based White Motor Company to market and sell the excess trucks that CF didn't need, as it expanded, creating the White/Freightliner name. CF also built their own trailers, eliminating the middleman and allowing for costs to stay low. By purchasing custom trucks from a company they owned and building their own trailers, CF was able to hold a strategic advantage over its competition.

Freightliner terminated its contracts with White in 1977 and began to build a network of direct agent and dealer relationships. However, forced by a deregulation bill passed by Congress in 1980, CF sold its truck manufacturing business and the Freightliner brand to Daimler AG on July 31, 1981.

=== Con-way ===
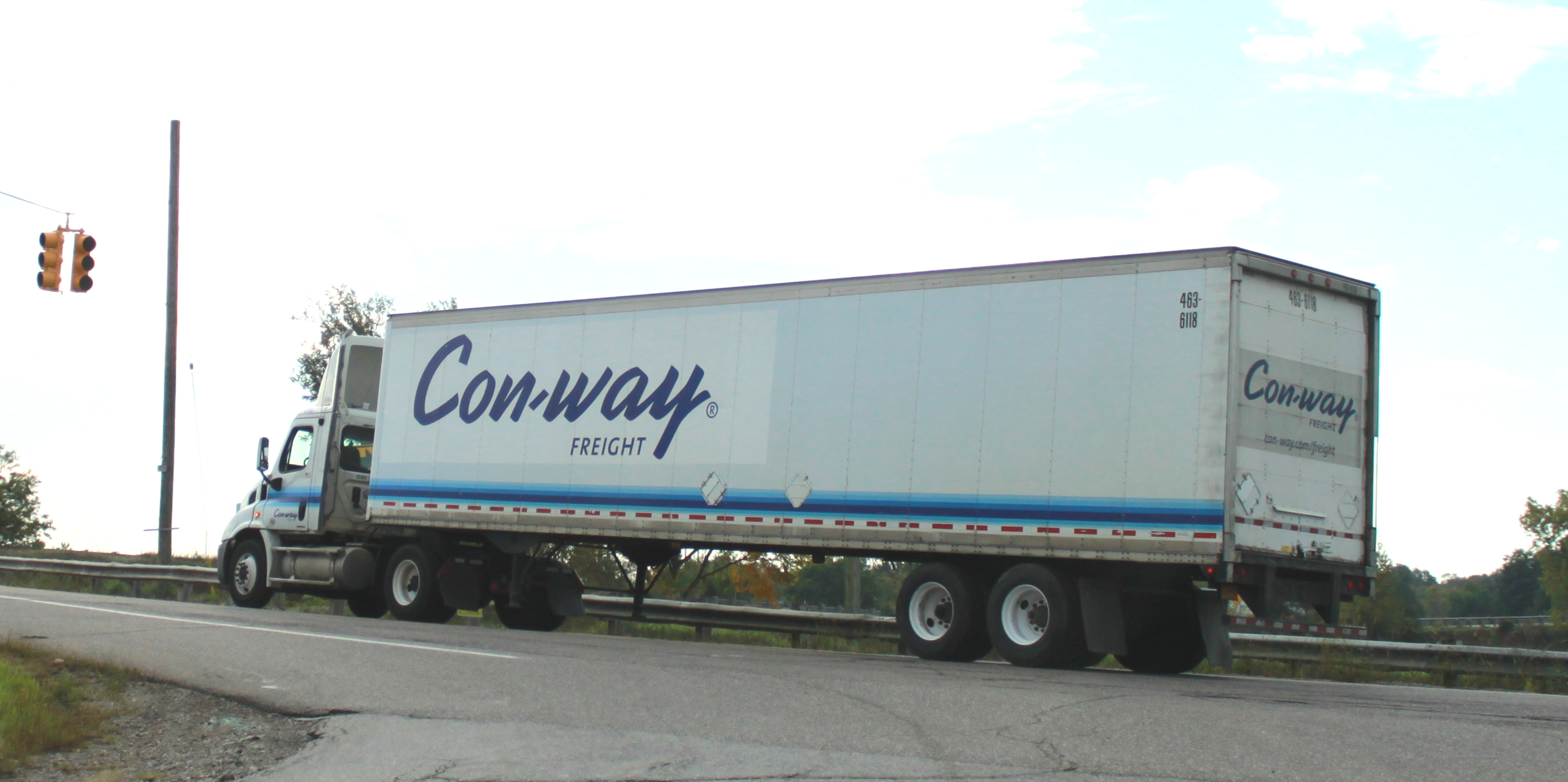
Con-way Freight truck

Con-way was founded by CF to serve as a non-union short-haul LTL carrier subsidiary in 1983. The name came from the beginning of Consolidated and the end of Freightways. Con-way was intended to act regionally and began in May 1983 with a subsidiary, Con-way Western Express (CWX), in three western states. In June, Con-way Central Express (CCX) started operations in the Midwest. These carriers together had 230 employees and 334 pieces of equipment and on their first day of operations handled 113 shipments.

CWX and CCX were followed by Con-way Southern Express (CSE) and Con-way Eastern Express (CEX) to serve the Southern and Eastern regions of the US, respectively. All except CEX, which was formerly Penn-Yan Express, were non-union. Shortly after its formation, Con-way dissolved CEX and allowed CCX to assume its routes turning Con-way into a fully non-union organization.

By the early 1990s, Con-way was bringing in about US$600 million in revenue for CF. When CF split in 1996, Con-way continued to be owned by CNF Transportation Inc., the parent company formerly called Consolidated Freightways, Inc. In 2006, CNF Transportation changed its name to Con-way, Inc. and its former Con-way subsidiary became Con-way Freight.

Con-way, Inc., along with Con-way Freight and its other subsidiaries, was acquired by XPO, Inc. in 2015 and by May 9, 2017 the Con-way brand had been retired with XPO, Inc. completing its integration the company into the XPO, Inc. brand.

=== Menlo Logistics ===
A Menlo facility in Singapore

Menlo Logistics Inc. was founded by CF in October 26, 1990 to provide warehouse, inventory, and transportation management services. Its name was intended to evoke California's Menlo Park and that area's connections with high-tech industries. The subsidiary's purpose was to provide its services through custom systems and software to allow Menlo clients to fully integrate supply chains. When CF split in 1996, Menlo was retained by the parent company, renamed CNF Transportation.

Menlo founded a joint venture subsidiary, Vector SCM, along with General Motors (GM) in 2000 as a global supply chain management company focused on the automotive industry. In 2002 Menlo was renamed Menlo Worldwide Logistics when CNF merged it with Vector SCM and CNF subsidiary Emery Worldwide Forwarding, a former subsidiary of the then-defunct Emery Air Freight. Emery Worldwide Forwarding was later renamed Menlo Worldwide Forwarding. Later, Menlo Logistics absorbed another former Emery Air Freight subsidiary, Emery Global Logistics.

Menlo Logistics subsidiary Menlo Worldwide Forwarding was sold to UPS in 2004 and the same year the logistics unit of CNF's Con-Way Transportation Service, Con-way Logistics, was merged into Menlo Logistics. Two years later, GM bought out Menlo Logistics' interest in Vector SCM. In 2007, Menlo Logistics acquired Singapore-based Cougar Holdings and Shanghai-based Chic Holdings.

Menlo Logistics along with its parent company, by then renamed Con-way, Inc., was acquired by XPO, Inc. in 2015. Following the acquisition, Menlo was folded into XPO, Inc. and the brand was retired.

=== Emery Worldwide ===
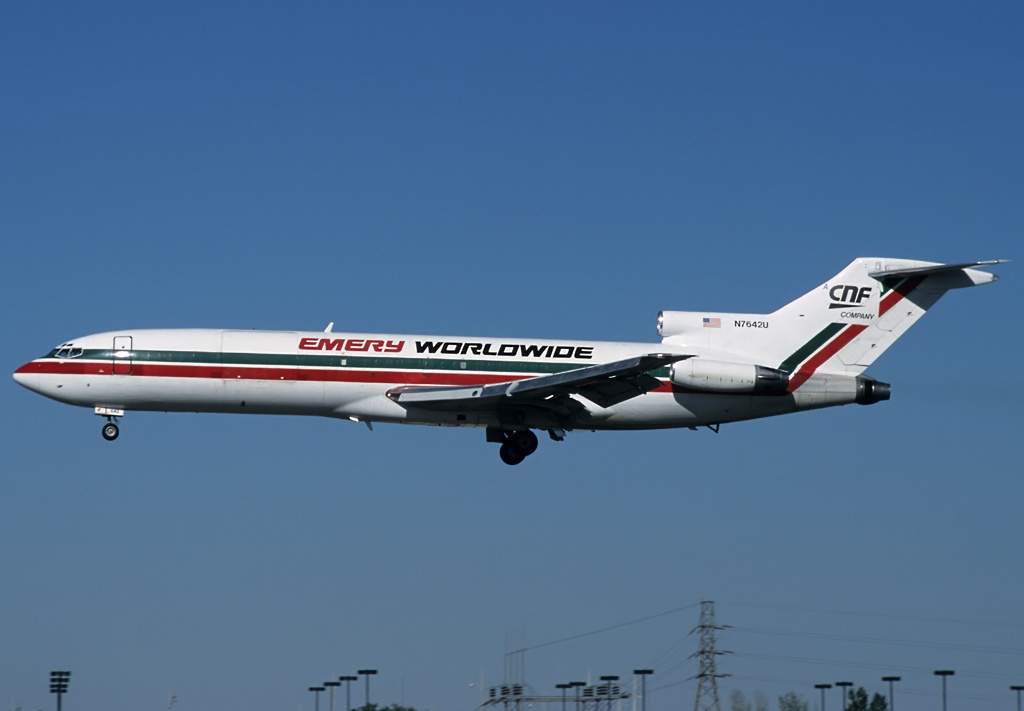
An Emery Worldwide aircraft landing at Minneapolis–Saint Paul International Airport in 2000

The predecessor of Emery Worldwide, Emery Air Freight, had been founded in 1946 and acquired Purolator Courier, Inc. in 1987. When CF bought Emery Worldwide in 1989, CF merged its existing air freight subsidiary, CF Air Freight, into Emery to form Emery Worldwide, A CF Company. However, Purolator's debt load meant Emery was losing almost US$1 million a week the time of acquisition. This led CF to restructure Emery, particularly its overnight service, bringing it to profitability by the mid 1990s.

When CF split in 1996, Emery was retained by the parent company, renamed CNF Transportation. But, due to poor fleet maintenance, Emery shut down aircraft operations in 2001 and in 2002 its air freight forwarding division, Emery Worldwide Forwarding which continued to operate, was put under CNF subsidiary Menlo Worldwide Logistics. It was later renamed Menlo Worldwide Forwarding and was acquired by UPS in 2004. Following Emery's shut-down, Menlo Logistics absorbed former Emery subsidiary Emery Global Logistics. UPS continued to use the name Emery Worldwide for the air freight operations of UPS subsidiary UPS Supply Chain Solutions.

== See also ==
- List of companies based in Oregon
