= Heartland Express =

American trucking company

Heartland Express, Inc.
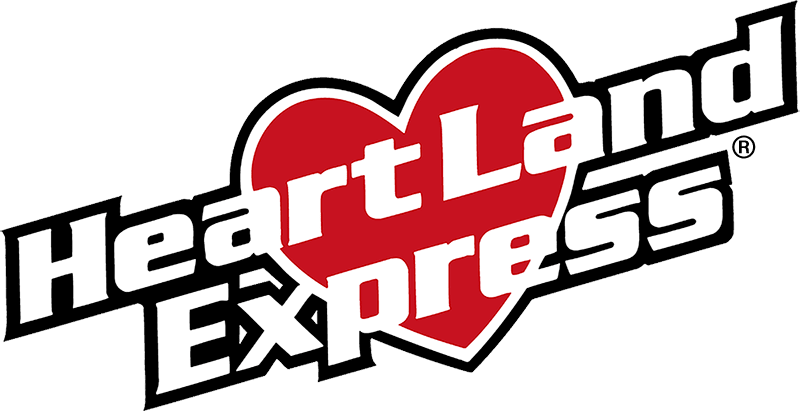
- Type: Public
- Traded as: Nasdaq: HTLD; S&P 600 component
- Industry: Freight transport
- Founded: 1978
- Headquarters: North Liberty, Iowa, U.S.
- Subsidiaries: CFI
- Website: www.heartlandexpress.com

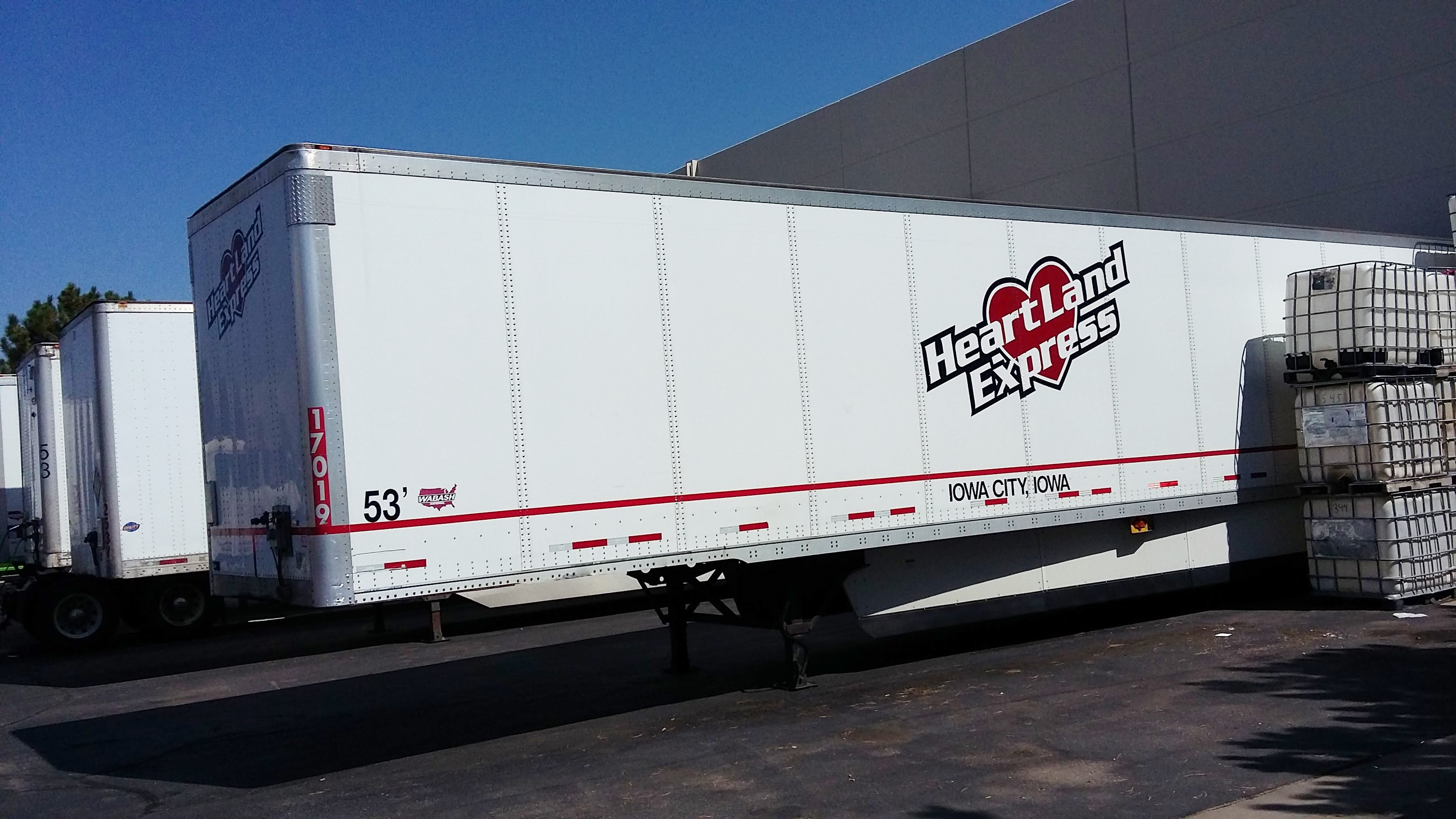
Side view of a Heartland Express trailer in 2016

Heartland Express is an American trucking company headquartered in North Liberty, Iowa. The company offers truckload shipping services across the United States.

== History ==
Heartland Express was founded in 1978 by Russell A. Gerdin.

Heartland Express went public in 1986. By 1988, the company had a fleet of more than 300 tractors and a net income of more than $5 million.

Heartland Express acquired Illinois-based Munson Transportation in 1994, doubling the size of the company. By the end of the following year, the company reported a net income of more than $20.5 million.

In 2013, Heartland Express purchased Gordon Trucking for $300 million. The acquisition made the company the fifth-largest asset-based trucking company in the United States.

In 2017, the company acquired Interstate Distributor from Saltchuk for $113 million. Heartland express acquired Millis Transfer in 2019 for $150 Million.

In 2022, Heartland Express acquired Smith Transport for $170 million. The company acquired the trucking assets of Contract Freighters, Inc. (CFI) from TFI International for $525 million later the same year.

== Operations ==
Heartland Express offers long-haul, regional, and dedicated truckload services. As of 2025, the company operates terminals in fourteen U.S. states.
