= Isentia =

Media intelligence and data technology company

- Fate: Acquired by Access Intelligence plc
- Headquarters: Sydney, Australia
- Key people: Neville Jeffress, Founder; Ed Harrison, MD and CEO
- Website: isentia.com

Isentia is a media intelligence and data technology company owned by Access Intelligence and headquartered in Sydney, Australia. It has a corporate history dating from 1982. It has offices in Melbourne, Canberra, Brisbane, Adelaide, Perth (Australia), Wellington, Auckland (New Zealand), Kuala Lumpur (Malaysia), Singapore, Manila, Bangkok, Jakarta and Ho Chi Minh City.

== Overview ==
Formerly known as Sentia Media and before that Media Monitors, the company rebranded to Sentia Media in 2012 and then moved all its companies under one name, Isentia in March 2013. The company became public on 5 June 2014, listing on the Australian Securities Exchange. Before listing, it was owned by Australian private equity group Quadrant Private Equity since July 2010. Acquisitions since 2010 include: Singapore-based social media and online intelligence evaluation company Brandtology; Australian social media specialists BuzzNumbers; South East Asia's largest media intelligence company, MediaBanc; and Beijing company, ChinaClipping. Isentia also purchased China-based China Newswire, which was formerly owned by global rival Cision before Cision divested the business to Matoka Capital.

== History ==
Neville Jeffress, the owner of a firm that managed the sale and publication of classified advertising, began acquiring clipping services in 1982, including NSW Country Press, Lynch Pidler Pty and the Australian Press Cutting Agency. This service operated as Neville Jeffress/Pidler Pty Ltd. from 1982 to 1993 when it purchased and amalgamated Media Monitors Australia, and began operating as Media Monitors. By the time Neville Jeffress/Pidler Pty Ltd changed its name to Media Monitors Australia Pty Ltd in 1993, the company had established itself as one of Australia's largest media monitoring companies. Media Monitors stepped out of Australasia by opening an office in Singapore in 2006. In 2011 Media Monitors Group was purchased by Australian private equity company Quadrant. On 9 February 2012, the company unified its brands under one corporate name, Sentia Media, and in 2013 the company moved under one name across the Asia-Pacific region, Isentia. In February 2018, long-time CEO John Croll stepped down and was succeeded by former Yahoo7 Australia head Ed Harrison in July 2018. In 2019, Isentia made further executive appointments with James Merritt (CEO of Asia) and Russ Horell as the new Chief Commercial Officer.

=== Acquisitions ===
In August 2013 Isentia bought social media agency Two Social, extending the reach of the company in the social media sphere.

In June 2016, Isentia acquired Social Net Creator Ltd, expanding its market into South Korea. The company has also completed a bolt-on acquisition in Thailand and is close to finalising two further acquisitions in Vietnam and Hong Kong.

In December 2016, Isentia acquired Shanghai-based China Newswire, a SaaS platform providing news monitoring and content marketing distribution services to clients in China. With the acquisition, China Newswire's CEO Danny Levinson became Isentia's new Regional Director for Asia, as the operations chief and evangelist for the company's artificial intelligence data services in its 10 Asian offices across China, Korea, Taiwan, Hong Kong, Thailand, Indonesia, Philippines, Singapore, Vietnam, and Malaysia.

=== Australian Securities Exchange listing ===
In May 2014, Isentia lodged a prospectus in preparation for a listing on the Australian Securities Exchange. Isentia listed on the ASX in June of the same year. The company was delisted in 2021 after being acquired by Access Intelligence plc.
