= 3PD, Inc. =

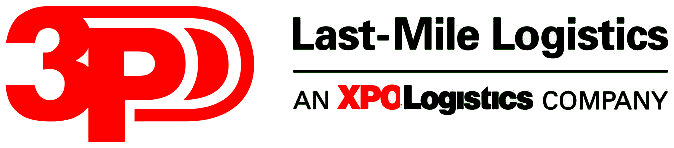
- Industry: Last-Mile Logistics Services
- Founded: 2001
- Headquarters: Marietta, Georgia, United States
- Key people: Karl Meyer, CEO
- Number of employees: 600
- Parent: XPO, Inc
- Website: 3pd.com (archived)

3PD, Inc., based in Marietta, Georgia, is one of the largest providers of in-home residential delivery and installation services in the United States. 3PD facilitates in-home delivery, assembly and installation of "heavy goods", those items like furniture and appliances that may require the service team to enter the home and place them in a specific area or room. 3PD utilizes a national network of contracted delivery carriers and installation providers. Although 3PD handles nearly 5 million delivery and installation orders a year, many consumers who have received service from the company may not recognize the name. The contracted carriers and other providers used by 3PD often arrive under their own company name, or the brand of the retailer where the purchase was made.

== History ==
The company was founded in 2001 by Karl and Randy Meyer and Chris Murphy, from Marietta, GA. The company had initially grown very rapidly throughout the United States with several key customers.

3PD has made several significant acquisitions since 2006:

- General Transportation Services, Inc.- In December 2006, the company acquired General Transportation Services, Inc., also known as GTS, of Syracuse, NY. The company continues to maintain a significant corporate presence in the Syracuse area.
- Affinity Logistics - In June 2007, 3PD acquired Affinity Logistics, also of Marietta, GA.
- Penchant Software - In July 2009, 3PD acquired Penchant Software of Minneapolis, MN. Penchant Software is a provider of planning, tracking and execution software for logistics companies and continues to be based in Minneapolis.
- Optima Service Solutions- On November 15, 2013, XPO, Inc. acquired Optima Service Solutions of Roswell, GA, expanding the last mile offerings of its 3PD unit.

As of August 18, 2013, the company has established a network of operations that spans 47 states in the US as well as Canada and Guam.

Previously an Arcapita holding, 3PD was acquired by XPO, Inc. on August 16, 2013.
