= Neville Jeffress =

Australian advertising executive

- Born: 29 July 1920; Sydney, Australia
- Died: 13 September 2007 (aged 87); England, United Kingdom
- Occupations: Advertising executive Founder of Media Monitors Australia

Neville Jeffress (29 July 1920 – 13 September 2007) was an Australian advertising executive and the founder of Media Monitors Australia, now called Isentia.

== Background ==
Jeffress was raised and educated in Sydney. In 1936 he joined the Afternoon Sun newspaper in Sydney as a clerk in the publishing department, before enrolling in the Royal Australian Air Force as a Wireless operator/airgunner in 1941, where he served for five years.

On his return, he purchased a news agency in Fairlight and commenced a classified advertising service from the rear of the news agency. The Neville Jeffress Advertising company grew into a national operation operating in all states.

Jeffress expanded his advertising interests in 1976 when he purchased the Sydney advertising agency, L. B. Rennie and Partners. The Rennie agency, which started in the late 1940s, specialised in advertising industrial and technical products, processes and services. The active partners of the Rennie agency at the time were Les Rennie, Owen Amos and Ken Baker.

The Neville Jeffress Advertising agency, including L. B. Rennie and Partners, was sold to the United States-based conglomerate, TMP Worldwide Inc in 1996.

In 1982, Jeffress purchased the NSW Country Press and merged it with the Sydney press clipping firm, Lynch Pidler Pty. Ltd. The new company, Neville Jeffress/Pidler Pty. Ltd., grew through the acquisition of other press clipping services, including Australia's oldest service, the Australian Press Cutting Agency, founded in Melbourne in 1904. Melbourne's Australian Reference Service and Media Monitors Australia were also acquired, and the name Media Monitors was adopted. The company is now called Isentia Pty Limited.
