= World Trade Center Guadalajara =

Mexican building complex

Centro GWTC

General information
- Location: Guadalajara, Jalisco, Mexico

The GWTC Center is a building complex in Guadalajara, Jalisco, Mexico. It consists of two 13-story towers joined at the top by an arc. It was founded in 1988 and was redesigned as a tech hub in the 2000s.
