= Owner-operator =

Business owner also running daily activities

An owner-operator is an owner of a small business or microbusiness who also runs the day-to-day operations of the company. The owner-operator business model is prevalent in multiple industries, including trucking and franchising across restaurant chains, health care, logistics, maintenance, repair, and operations.

== Trucking ==
In the trucking industry in the United States and Canada, the term "owner-operator" typically refers to independent contractors who provide transportation services using their own semi-trailer trucks. The owner-operator is a self-employed commercial truck driver or a small business that operates trucks for transporting goods over highways for its customers. Most owner-operators become drivers for trucking companies first to gain experience and determine whether the career is for them.

The Motor Carrier Act of 1980 deregulated the industry and made it easier for manufacturers to set their own prices on shipping goods, and also allowed owner-operators to be more successful by taking some of the control out of the hands of the larger motor carriers. It was now possible to find a carrier willing to haul goods for what customers wanted to pay rather than what the larger carriers' rates were.

- An owner-operator is free to either haul freelance (non-committal to any one firm or product) or enter into a lease agreement to dedicate their equipment to one customer or product
- The owner-operator typically has to pay higher rates on insurance due to smaller size than most larger companies, meaning they have to charge more to balance the cost
- There are many things to consider before becoming an owner-operator, including business setup, accounting, type of vehicle, and licenses

== Franchising ==
The owner-operator model is common in franchising, in which franchisee is heavily involved in the daily operations of the business. This model is often used when in business categories that rely on active daily leadership, like children's education.
