= Bolt-on acquisition =

Type of corporate acquisition

Bolt-on acquisition refers to the acquisition of smaller companies, usually in the same line of business, that presents strategic value. This is in contrast to primary acquisitions of other companies which are generally in different industries, require larger investments, or are of similar size to the acquiring company.

== Overview ==
The trend of making bolt-on acquisitions is particularly prominent in downmarkets. Private equity firms support such smaller and strategic acquisitions in order to increase the value of the acquiring company prior to sale. Also in a downmarket, companies look to grow via smaller, strategic acquisitions rather than building through major business purchases or mergers that represent higher risks or are more difficult to finance. These bolt-on acquisitions allow companies to enhance their product portfolio, technological position, market reach and customer service capabilities with much lower levels of investment.

Another major advantage of bolt-on acquisitions is the enhancement of core businesses and using mergers and acquisitions activity to gain leadership positions in a limited number of areas. Bolt-on acquisition companies look to become more specialized in smaller selected areas rather than following a diversifying strategy.

Other potential benefits of these acquisitions over bigger acquisitions are:

- Require less work to integrate as companies being acquired are smaller
- Competition between buyers may be less.
- Smaller companies are often more willing to be acquired by large companies.
- Opens up more options for large companies looking for acquisitions as restrictions on size etc. do not apply
- Allows entry into new geographic markets and increased penetration in existing markets without the struggles of setting up new locations, especially for chain stores

== Examples ==
Chemical companies like Akzo Nobel and Dupont have made significant number of bolt-on acquisitions.

According to a recent survey, 97 percent of private equity firms expect at least one in four of the companies in their portfolio to undertake a bolt-on buy prior to exit.
