= XPO, Inc. =

American transportation company

- Formerly: XPO Logistics, Inc. (2011–2022)
- Type: Public
- Traded as: NYSE: XPO; S&P 400 component
- Industry: Supply chain management; Transportation; Logistics
- Founded: 2000; 26 years ago
- Founder: Brad Jacobs
- Headquarters: Greenwich, Connecticut, US
- Number of locations: 592 (2025)
- Area served: Europe and North America
- Key people: Mario Harik (chairman and CEO); Dave Bates (COO)
- Services: LTL; Transportation; Logistics; Shipping; Land transport; Freight; Supply chain
- Revenue: ▲US$8.16 billion (2025)
- Operating income: ▼US$656 million (2025)
- Net income: ▼US$316 million (2025)
- Total assets: ▲US$8.19 billion (2025)
- Total equity: ▲US$1.86 billion (2025)
- Number of employees: 37,000 (2025)
- Website: www.xpo.com

XPO, Inc., formerly XPO Logistics, is an American transportation company that conducts less-than-truckload shipping, or "LTL" in North America. The company has headquarters in Greenwich, Connecticut, and has 592 locations globally. XPO is the second largest provider of LTL services in North America, operating in 99 percent of all U.S. postal codes.

In Europe, XPO provides dedicated truckload, LTL, truck brokerage, managed transportation, last mile, and freight forwarding services. The company also manages multimodal solutions, such as road-rail and road-short sea combinations.

== History ==
=== 2011–2021 ===
The company was initially called Express-1 Expedited Solutions and listed on American Stock Exchange under the ticker symbol XPO. It was acquired by Brad Jacobs and renamed to XPO Logistics in September 2011. In June 2012, XPO listed its shares on the New York Stock Exchange.

XPO has acquired a number of logistics businesses in North America and overseas. Some notable acquisitions include: 3PD, Inc. (August 2013), Pacer International, Inc. (March 2014), Norbert Dentressangle SA (April 2015) and Con-way Inc. (October 2015). XPO paid US$3.56 billion, which included acquired debt, for European transport company Norbert Dentressangle and $3 billion for Con-way. In 2016, XPO sold its truckload division (acquired from Con-Way) to TransForce for $558 million in cash.

In June 2016, XPO was included in the Fortune 500 list of the largest US corporations based on revenue.

Beginning in 2021, XPO Logistics broke into three separate publicly traded companies, making XPO solely a less-than-truckload (LTL) provider.

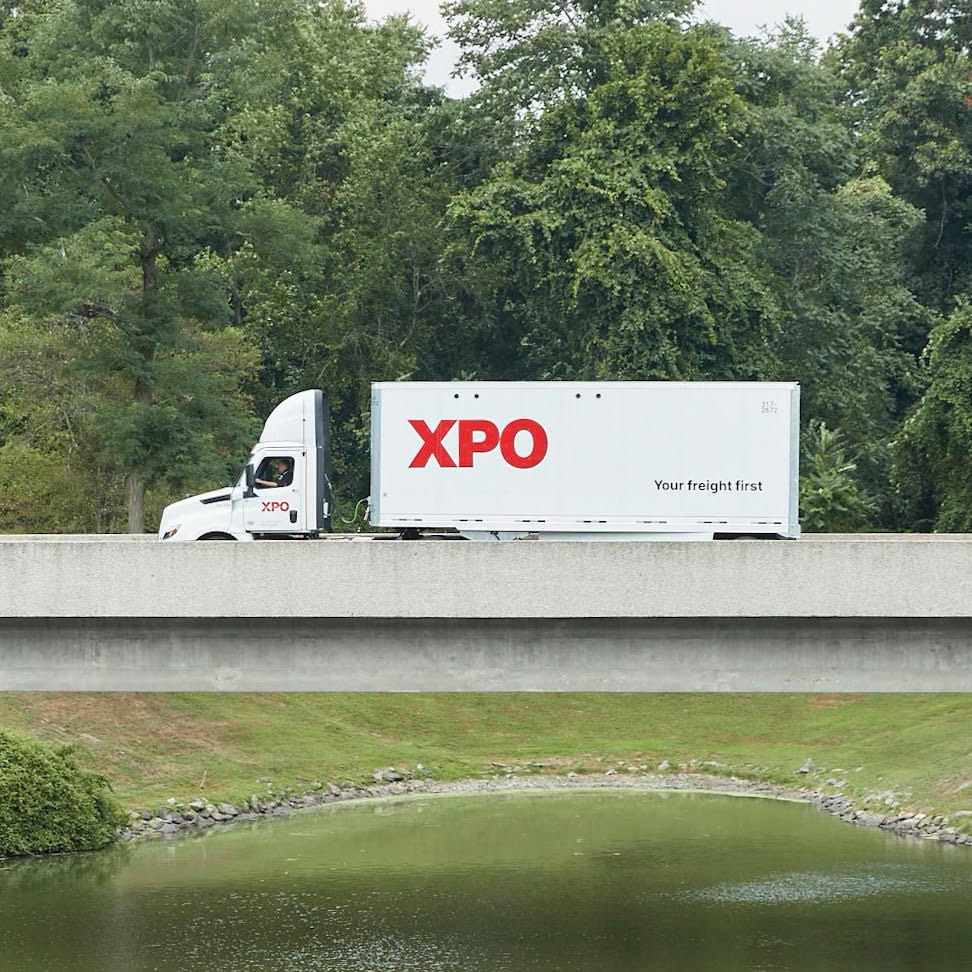
XPO truck

=== GXO Logistics ===
In August 2021, the company spun off its contract logistics business into a separate company named GXO Logistics, with facilities located primarily throughout North America and Europe. GXO stands for "game-changing opportunities". Patrick Kelleher is the CEO of the company.

=== RXO ===
XPO spun off its brokerage and other services—managed transportation, global forwarding and last-mile logistics—to a separate company named RXO, Inc. in November 2022. RXO is headquartered in Charlotte, North Carolina. Drew Wilkerson is CEO of the company.

=== 2022–present ===
XPO dropped "Logistics" from its name in December 2022 and remains solely an LTL carrier, which allows multiple customers to transport goods in the same truck. In August 2022, Brad Jacobs announced he was stepping down as CEO and would serve as executive chairman. Mario Harik, XPO's former chief information officer, who also serves as the company's president, was appointed as CEO. In March 2022, XPO sold its North American intermodal business to Illinois-based STG Logistics for $710 million. In March 2023, XPO appointed J. Wes Frye, a retired industry veteran, to its board of directors. In April 2023, XPO announced the hire of Dave Bates as chief operating officer of North American LTL. In December 2023, XPO received approval from a Delaware bankruptcy court to acquire 28 service centers of Yellow Corporation for $870 million as a part of Chapter 11 bankruptcy. The acquisition was finalized in January 2024.

In 2025, XPO was listed by DriveBigTrucks.com as one of the best trucking companies for women, based on factors such as safety practices, benefits, and career support. Also in 2025, Fortune magazine included XPO on its list of America's Most Innovative Companies. XPO was the only pure play LTL carrier included in the 300-company list.

In December 2025, XPO announced that Brad Jacobs would step down as executive chairman at the end of the year. Mario Harik was appointed chairman of the board while continuing to serve as CEO.

== Operations ==
=== North America ===
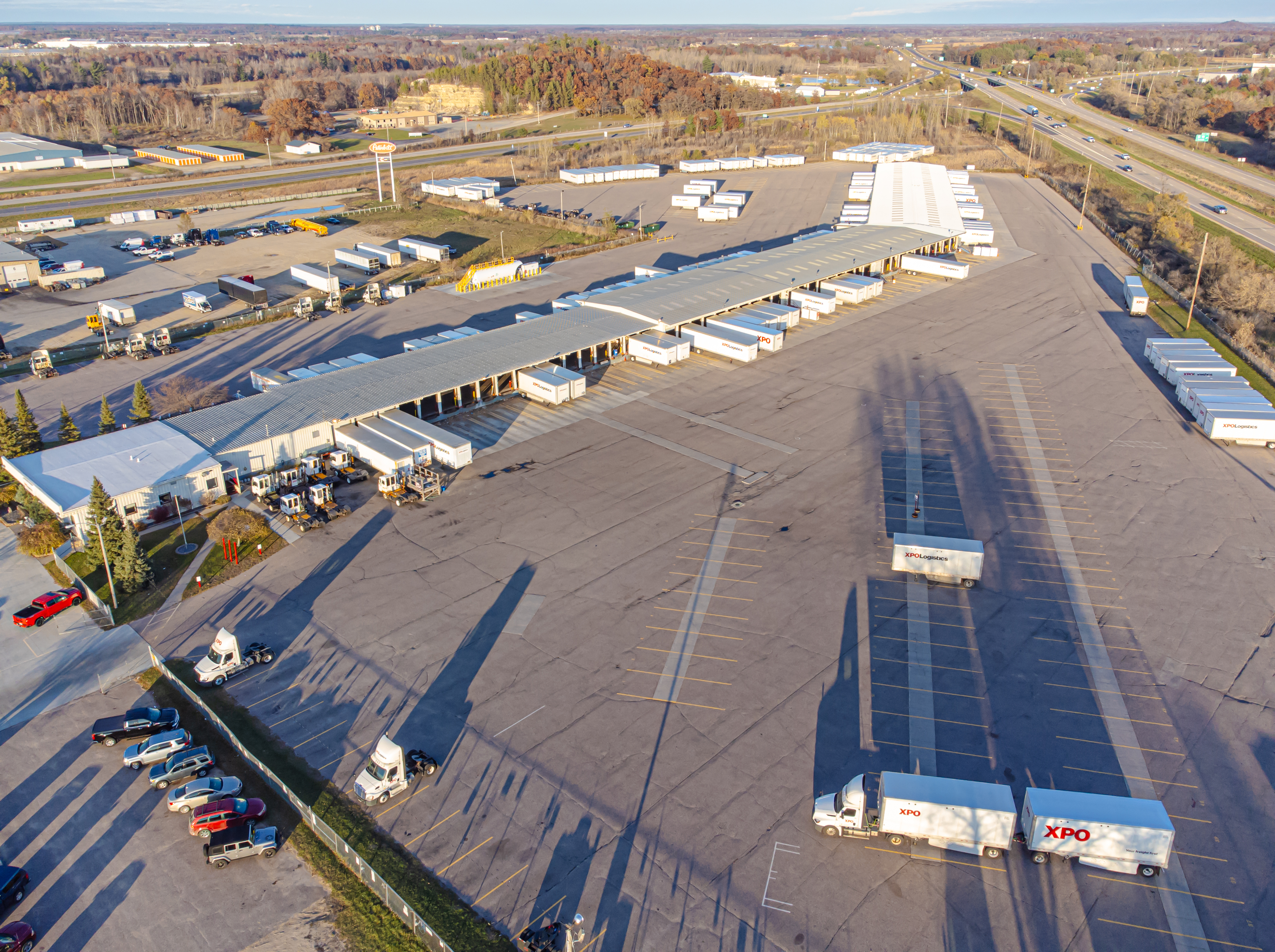
XPO LTL facility in Tomah, Wisconsin, formerly a Con-way Freight terminal

XPO is the second largest provider of less-than-truckload services in North America. LTL is a freight model which involves shipping smaller quantities of goods for multiple customers at a time. In 2022, XPO's CEO stated that the company operates in 99% of U.S. zip codes. As of March 2022, XPO also produced new and re-manufactured trailers at a factory in Searcy, Arkansas.

=== Europe ===
XPO provides dedicated truckload, LTL, truck brokerage, managed transportation, last mile and freight forwarding in Europe. The company also manages multimodal solutions, such as road-rail and road-short sea combinations. 1,000 new drivers were hired in the U.K. and Ireland in 2022.

== Controversy ==
A 2018 article by The New York Times profiled the experiences of several employees working at a Memphis, Tennessee, warehouse operated by XPO. The warehouse had no windows or air conditioning, and sometimes temperatures there surpassed 100 °F (38 °C). The article described several cases of warehouse workers miscarrying, which were attributed to management's refusal to allow pregnant workers to avoid strenuous jobs. According to the article and XPO employees, a worker died of cardiac arrest on the warehouse floor in 2017 and employees said they were told by managers to continue working. A spokesperson for XPO called the allegations in the article "unsubstantiated, filled with inaccuracies", and claimed they were "fueled by the Teamsters".

In October 2021, XPO agreed to pay $30 million to 784 drivers who said the company paid them less than minimum wage.

== See also ==
- American Trucking Associations
- Economy of Connecticut
- Logistics companies
