= Truckload shipping =

Shipping Using Semi Trucks

Truckload shipping is freight transport in which a semi-trailer or intermodal container is filled entirely with one type of cargo. It differs from less-than-truckload shipping (LTL) in which freight from multiple customers is combined in one trailer. A truckload carrier is a trucking company that contracts entire trailer-load to a single customer.

== Description ==
The three types of truckload shipment are dry van, flatbed, and refrigerated.

Truckload shipments are used for large shipments of freight and typically run on 48 foot or 53 foot dry van trailers which hold 24 or 26 pallets respectively. If multiple truckloads are needed for a large shipment, truckload shipping generally is cheaper, faster, and less damaging to goods than booking a large number of less-than-truckload shipping trips.

Efficiency and productivity of the goods' packaging can be improved in truckload shipping. Compared to less-than-truckload, full truckload is cost-effective when weight is high. Full-truckload freight is faster than LTL because it is sent directly to the destination and does not make stops to pick up or drop off other cargo.

== Packaging ==
Freight is usually loaded onto pallets for unit loads. Sturdy shipping containers such as crates or corrugated fiberboard boxes are commonly used. Carriers have published tariffs that provide some guidance for packaging. Packaging engineers design and test packaging to meet the specific needs of the logistics system and the product being shipped.

Truckload shipments are sometimes broken down into individual containers and further shipped by LTL or express carriers. Packaging for TL often needs to withstand the more severe handling of individual shipments. A typical full truckload for a dry van trailer consists of 24 standard pallets of cargo that weighs up to 45,000 lbs. (or more).

== History ==
When the US Interstate Highway System expanded in the 1950s, the trucking industry took over a large market share of goods transportation, which had previously relied primarily on railroads. The Interstate Highway System allowed merchandise to travel door to door from a distribution center in one area to a distribution center in another area, and it made long-distance freight transport faster.

== Sources ==
- Constantin, James A. and Hudson, William J.. Motor Transportation: Principles and Practices. The Ronal Press Company. New York, 1958. Pages 149–154.
- Bardi, Joseph E., Coyle, John J., and Langley, John C. Jr..The Management of Business Logistics: A Supply Chain Perspective. Cengage Learning, 2000. Pages 45–58, 67–81.
- McKinlay, A. H., "Transport Packaging", IoPP, 2004
- Fiedler, R. M, "Distribution Packaging Technology", IoPP, 1995
