= Less-than-truckload shipping =

Amount of freight in shipping

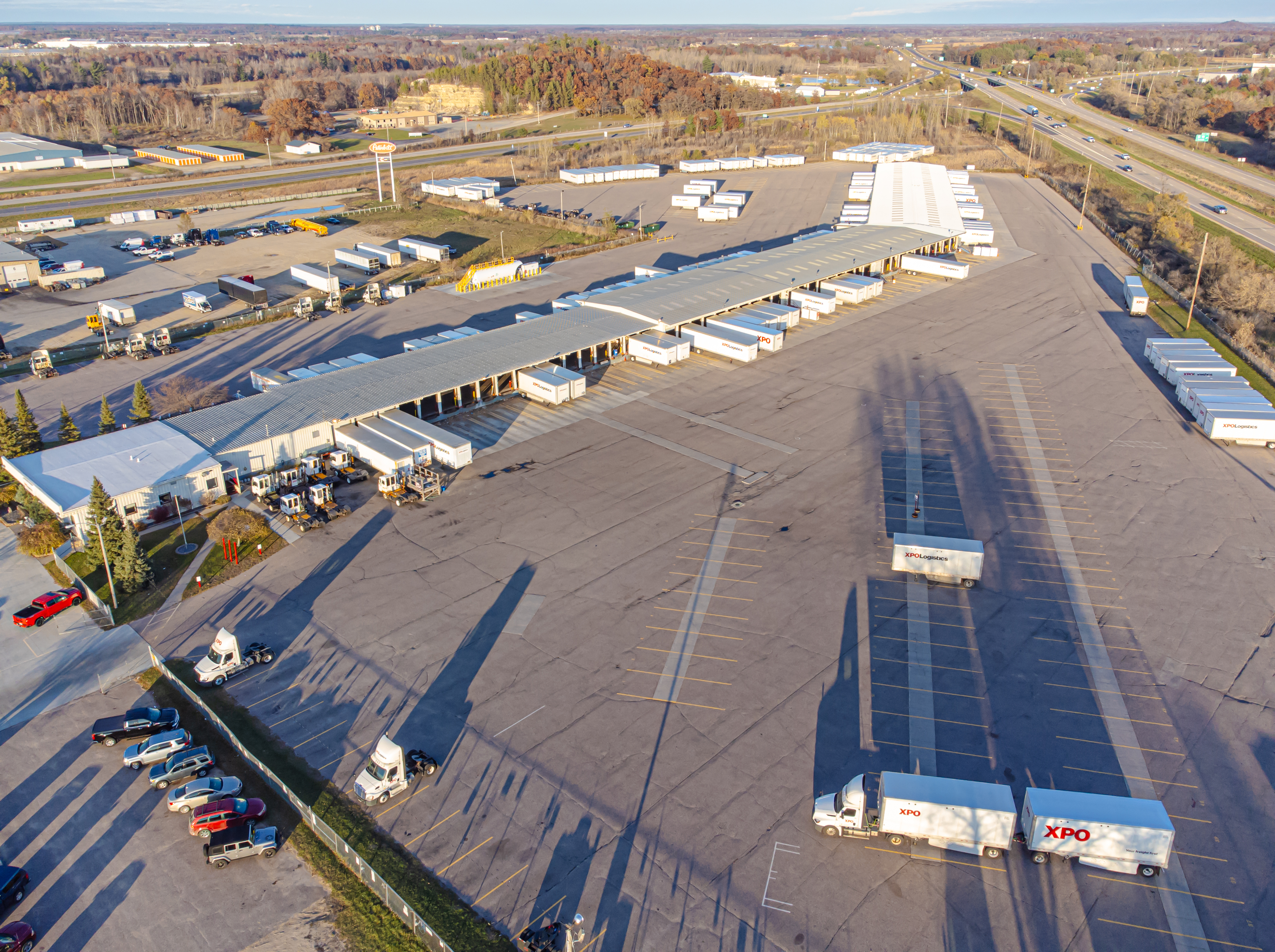
XPO LTL facility in Tomah, Wisconsin, formerly a Con-way Freight terminal

Less-than-truckload shipping or less than load (LTL) is the transportation of freight amounts as small as one parcel and as large as a full truckload. Parcel carriers handle small packages and freight that can be broken down into units less than approximately 150 pounds (68 kg). Full truckload carriers move entire semi-trailers. Semi-trailers are typically between 26 and 53 feet (7.92 and 16.15 m) and require a substantial amount of freight to make such transportation economical. The term LTL can refer to the freight itself, or to the carrier that transports such freight.

== LTL operations vs. FTL operations ==
Full truck load (FTL) carriers typically haul loads for one single shipper. In these cases, the shipper "rents" a trailer to transport their product where it needs to go, typically paying a "per mile rate" from the carrier. However, with LTL, a single trailer can carry several different shippers' shipments and since each shipment is technically "less than a truckload" they would consider that to be LTL.

Due to the basic differences between these two modes, there are freight carriers who either specialize in FTL or LTL. While these carriers can crossover and handle freight shipments from the other mode, typically they operate under one mode. Oftentimes an LTL carrier can be references as a "common" carrier, one who handles common freight above what would normally ship via FedEx Ground, or UPS or USPS. LTL common carriers are also more likely to accept loose (non-palletized) cargo than the other two modes, FTL and parcel.

Less than truckload carriers use hub and spoke distribution, where linehauls or truck routes are the spokes, and service terminals for each carrier are the hubs (also called distribution centers or DCs). Terminals collect local freight from the various shippers they work with in an area and use the hub to consolidate the freight into regions or areas where those shipments are destined to be delivered. Because of the efficiency of this order of operations, most deliveries are performed in the morning and most pickups are made in the afternoon.

Pickup and delivery drivers usually have set casual routes which they travel every day or several times a week, so the driver has an opportunity to develop a rapport with their customers. Once the driver has filled their trailer or completed their assigned route, they return to their terminal for unloading. The trailer is unloaded and the individual shipments are then weighed and inspected to verify their conformity to the description contained in the accompanying paperwork.

Transit times for LTL freight are longer than for full truckload freight (FTL). LTL transit times are not directly related only to the distance between shipper and consignee. Instead, LTL transit times are also dependent upon the makeup of the network of terminals and breakbulks that are operated by a given carrier and that carrier's beyond agents and interline partners. For example, if a shipment is picked up and delivered by the same freight terminal, or if the freight must be sorted and routed only once while in transit, the freight will likely be delivered on the next business day after pickup. If the freight must be sorted and routed more than once, or if more than one linehaul is required for transportation to the delivering terminal, then the transit time will be longer.

The main advantage to using an LTL carrier is that a shipment may be transported for a fraction of the cost of hiring an entire truck and trailer for an exclusive shipment.

== LTL operations versus parcel carrier operations ==
=== Parcel carrier operations ===
A parcel carrier traditionally only handles pieces weighing less than approximately 150 pounds (68 kg). Parcel carriers typically compete with LTL carriers by convincing shippers to break larger shipments down to smaller packages. Parcel carriers typically refer to multipiece shipments as "hundredweight" shipments as the rating is based on 100 pounds (45 kg). The hundredweight rate is multiplied by the shipment's weight and then divided by 100 and then rounded up to the nearest hundred.

=== LTL carrier operation ===
LTL carriers prefer to handle shipments with the fewest handling units possible. LTL carriers prefer a shipment of one pallet containing many boxes that are stretch wrapped together to form one piece rather than many individual pieces. This reduces handling costs and the risk of damage during transit. The per-pound rates of LTL carriers are typically less than the per-pound rates of parcel carriers.

== Preparing shipments for LTL carriers ==
Freight sent via LTL carriers must be handled several times during transit, often by different carriers. It must be packaged to protect it from scuffing, vibration, crushing, dropping, humidity, condensation. Thus, it is normally good practice to load freight onto pallets or package freight into crates. Sturdy shipping containers such as corrugated fiberboard boxes are normally acceptable as well, but pallets are preferred. Carriers have published tariffs that provide some guidance for packaging. Packaging engineers design and test packaging to meet the specific needs of the logistics system and the product being shipped.

Proper packaging freight serves several purposes:

- It helps protect the freight from handling and transit damage.
- It helps protect freight from being damaged by shipper's freight.
- It helps reduce package pilferage
- It helps to avoid loss situations; situations in which some of the customer's freight is separated from the rest and lost in transit.

Other considerations:

- Type of shipment: pallet, drum, crate, skid, bags, rolls, reels, bales or other
- Size: height width depth
- Weight, each piece and total
- Insurance value coverage, if any
- Liftgate service requirements, if any
- Find the correct National Motor Freight Classification code
- Arrival notice, if any
- Hazardous-materials notice, if any
- Residential delivery notice

== Intermodal transportation of LTL shipping ==
Not all LTL shipments travel by truck only. LTL carriers rely on rail or air to forward some freight toward its destination. LTL carriers are normally able to deal with railroads more effectively than small shippers since LTL carriers typically send a large volume of freight daily. For example, a significant portion of rail intermodal traffic consists of truck trailers, often dozens in a single intermodal train, carrying LTL freight. LTL carriers are able to monitor railroad performance to ensure delivery of freight within the specified delivery window. An intermodal freight transport shipment employs several methods of transporting goods from start to finish. For instance, one shipment will start out on the railroad, then be transferred to an ocean carrier, and end up on a truck before delivery.

== See also ==
- Containerization § Less-than-container load
- Corrugated box design – Process of matching design factors for corrugated fiberboard boxes
- Dimensional weight – Pricing technique for commercial freight transport
- Rail freight transport § Less than carload freight
- Track and trace – Product locating technologies in logistics
- Unit load – Standard size for storage and handling
