= Corporations based in Saskatoon =

The Economy of Saskatoon is quite diverse. The city hosts the head-offices for several companies. Various grains, livestock, oil and gas, potash, uranium, wood and their spin off industries fuel the economy. The world's largest publicly traded uranium company, Cameco, and the world's largest potash producer, Nutrien, have corporate headquarters in Saskatoon. Nearly two-thirds of the world's recoverable potash reserves are located in the Saskatoon region.

== Agri-Food and Biotechnology ==
- Canadian Plasma Resources
- Guardian Biotechnologies
- Great Western Brewing Company
- IL Therapeutics
- Prairie Plant Systems
- Robin Hood Flour

== Financial Services ==
- Affinity Credit Union
- First Nations Bank of Canada

== Mining ==
- AREVA Resources Canada
- Cameco
- Nutrien

== Technology ==
- Quarterhill Inc. (formerly International Road Dynamics)
- SED Systems
- Mentor, a Siemens business (acquired Solido Design Automation)
- 7shifts

== Transportation and Logistics ==
- Canpotex
- Pronto Airways
- QA Technologies
- West Wind Aviation
- Yanke Group

== Utilities ==
- Saskatoon Light & Power
- YourLink

== Wholesale and Retail Sales ==
- Farmers of North America
- Federated Co-operatives
- Saskatoon Co-op
