= Economy of Saskatoon =

- Currency: Canadian dollar

Statistics
- All values, unless otherwise stated, are in US dollars.

The economy of Saskatoon has been associated with potash, oil and agriculture resulting in the moniker POW. Saskatoon's other nickname, the "Hub City," refers its ideal central location for distribution and logistics. Various grains, livestock, oil and gas, potash, uranium, wood and their spin off industries fuel the economy. The world's largest publicly traded uranium company, Cameco, and the world's largest potash producer, Nutrien, have corporate headquarters in Saskatoon. Nearly two-thirds of the world's recoverable potash reserves are located in the Saskatoon region.

== Recent growth ==
The year 2008 saw growth in residential and non-residential construction in the city and surrounding areas, which drove gains in many other sectors, including the wholesale and retail trade sector, as well as the financial, insurance and real estate sectors. Rising commodity prices also contributed to increases in the GDP for the agriculture, mining, oil and gas, and utilities sector,

Over 1000 new commercial or home-based businesses set up shop in Saskatoon in 2008, along with numerous expansions of existing companies. Over $900 Million was invested in residential and non-residential buildings in the past year, and nearly $2 Billion has been invested since 2006. There were also a substantial increase in housing starts over the past two years (2,319 in 2008, 2,380 in 2007) which is well above the average of 1,500 though this construction and empty speculation properties has resulted in an excess supply and accompanying drop in sales.

Population Growth & cost of living: In 2006–2007 Saskatoon has increased growth due to the influx of inter-provincial migrants, who were drawn to the previously low cost of living in the region. This has caused housing starts to hit their highest level in over 30 years as of February 2008. Saskatoon's overall economic output was predicted to have increased by 4.7% in 2007 and real estate costs have risen about 50% in 2007 alone, decreasing the previous cost of living advantage.

A recent study found that from January 2007 to July 2008 Saskatoon's population has actually shrunk by 2,000 residents. This would in part explain the increasing inventory of available housing, despite a major drop in housing starts. The consulting company "Generation 5" which predicted that Saskatoon had lost over 2,000 residents, partially based on a substantial increase in vacant houses, and houses for sale, was promptly fired by the City of Saskatoon.

The rising house costs have caused great strain to lower income families who can no longer afford the higher living costs. Many renters have been forced out of their place of residence due to recent condo conversions and rental vacancy rates have dropped to 0.6% as of October 2007.

== Major Employers ==
The largest employers in Saskatoon include:

- Saskatoon Health Region (11,000)
- University of Saskatchewan (7,170)
- Saskatchewan Institute of Applied Science and Technology (2,150)
- Federated Co-operatives (2,000)
- Graham Construction & Engineering (2,000)
- Siemen's Transportation Group (1,915)
- Maple Leaf Foods (1,000)
- Bank of Nova Scotia (783)
- Vecima Networks (782)
- CNH Global (New Holland Agriculture) (750)
- Yanke Group (750)
- Cameco (654)
- Concorde Group of Companies (650)
- AREVA Resources Canada Inc (500)

== Scientific research ==
Saskatoon has an agricultural biotechnology research base. Some of this research takes place at Innovation Place Research Park and the University of Saskatchewan (U of S). The U of S hosts the Vaccine and Infectious Disease Organization (VIDO) that conducts infectious diseases research to develop infectious diseases controls for humans and animals.

The University of Saskatchewan is also home to the Saskatchewan Isotope Laboratory, which studies environmental and climate change around the world. These studies provide secular records of environmental change that are critical to developing more accurate models of future environmental and climate variability that will dictate the economic well-being of the Prairie Provinces over the coming decades.

The U of S campus is the major employer in the city. As well, the campus is home to the Canadian Light Source, which is the largest scientific project completed in Canada in over 50 years. The 179 million dollar project resulted in a national synchrotron radiation facility that is used for a wide range of world-class scientific research.

== Mining ==
The world's largest publicly traded uranium company, Cameco, and the world's largest potash producer, Nutrien, have corporate headquarters in Saskatoon. Nearly two-thirds of the world's recoverable potash reserves are located in the Saskatoon region. Uranium plays an important role in Saskatoon's economy, with the city also hosting Areva NC Canadian headquarters. In 2011, BHP Billiton relocated its Canadian headquarters from Vancouver to Saskatoon. Many medium-sized mining companies also have their head office or regional offices in Saskatoon, such as Shore Gold, Denison Mines, Great West Exploration, Claude Resources, United Uranium, Star Uranium. Recently, lay offs in Saskatoon area have neared 2,000 to add to hundreds each lay offs in oil and gas, uranium and gold/diamonds.

== Oil ==
Saskatchewan's large oil and gas reserves are funding research into alternative energy solutions. At the University of Saskatchewan researchers are using nano-structures to improve solar cell efficiency.

== Food processing ==
Food processing is an important industry in Saskatoon. Saskatoon is the headquarters of Mitchell's Gourmet Foods, formerly known as Intercontinental Packers, which produces the Olympic Fine Meats line of products and is one of Canada's largest meat processors, employing more than 1,400 people. However, in late 2006, Maple Leaf Foods, owners of Mitchell's, announced it would be closing down its major plant in Saskatoon resulting in the loss of approximately 450 local jobs, along with an additional 350 jobs that were expected to be created by the construction of a new Mitchell's "kill plant" in the city's north end. Maple Leaf still operates a large sausage factory and is constructing a major distribution centre in the Marquis Industrial Area. Flour milling was always a traditional industry in Saskatoon and the two large mills stand high and prominent on Saskatoon's skyline. The mills were at one time run by Quaker Oats and Robin Hood, but processing here now takes place under the companies of Horizon Milling GP and Dover Mills. At one time Saskatoon was a notable beer brewing city with both Labatt's and Carling O'Keefe having breweries in the city, but both companies are now gone from the city. Great Western Brewing Company makes its products at the old Carling O'Keefe plant. Cargill Canada operates a canola seed crushing facility just east of the city.

== Technology and manufacturing ==
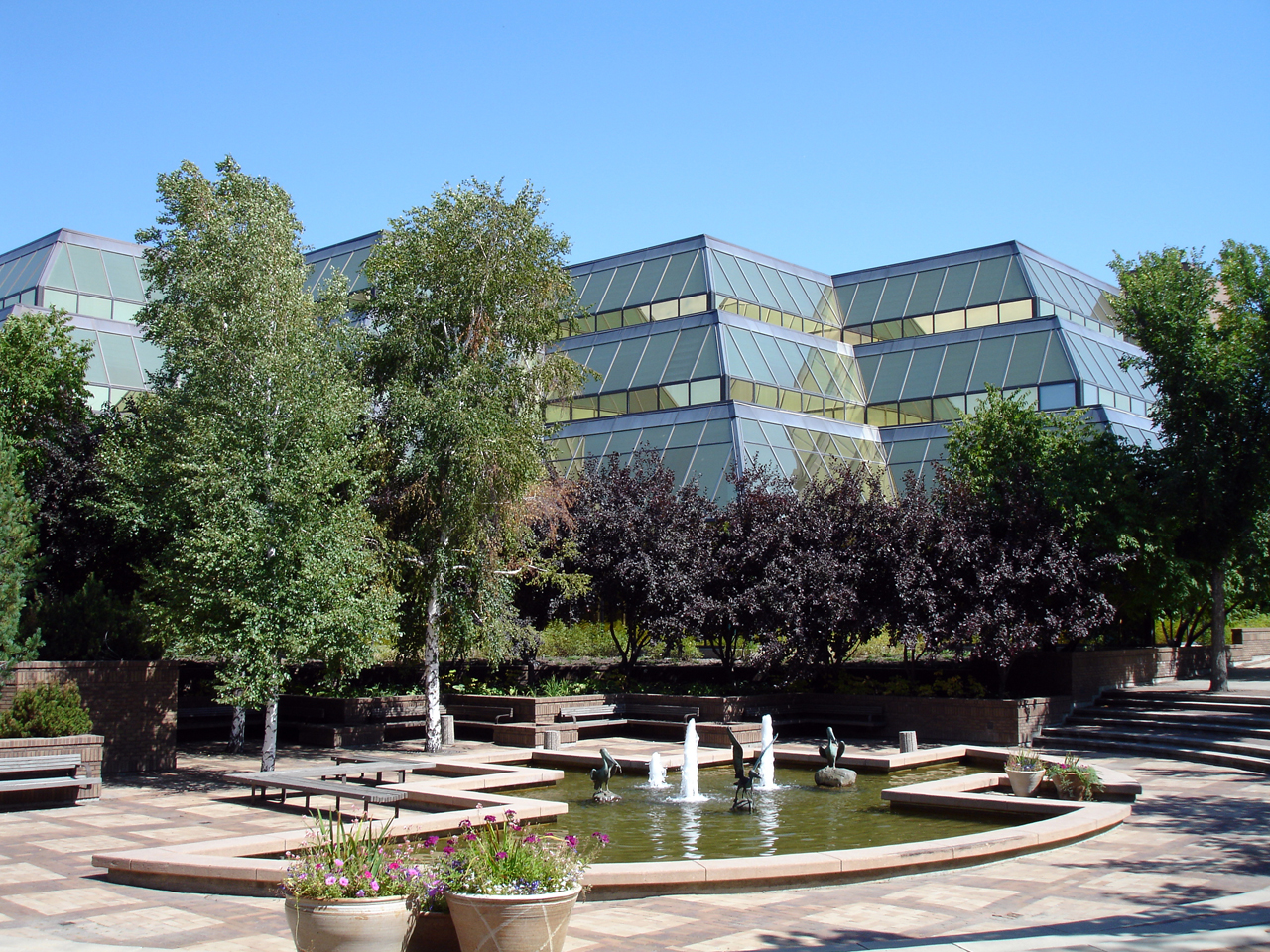
Galleria Building, Innovation Place (Saskatoon).

Saskatoon is home to several manufacturing companies such as a large CNH Global (Case New Holland) factory, Brandt, Siemens Laserworks Inc, Akzo Nobel, International Road Dynamics Inc., and Centennial Foods, as well as several companies in the Information Technology and telecom fields. Robin Hood flour is milled in Saskatoon.

SED Systems, Vecima Networks, Solido Design Automation, Saskatchewan Research Council, AMEC North America, Bayer Crop Science, Becker Underwood, and General Electric Healthcare all have a significant presence in Saskatoon, most located at Innovation Place. Saskatoon also hosts a Marriott International call centre which opened in 2005. First Nations Bank of Canada and Federated Co-operatives Limited executive offices are located in Saskatoon. In March 2008, Hatch Ltd announced it would open an office in Saskatoon employing 200 people. Many of the technology companies are located in Innovation Place Research Park.

Saskatoon is also home to a variety of bio-technology companies, these include Guardian Biotechnologies, IL Therapeutics among others.

== Financial Services ==
Most major Canadian banks and financial services companies have offices in Saskatoon serving the local community. Saskatoon is the home for the head office of First Nations Bank of Canada, Concentra Financial, Affinity Credit Union, and TCU Financial Group.

== Retail ==
Saskatoon has a mix of retail areas including a downtown central business district, street based retail, enclosed shopping centers and big-box power centers.

In terms of commercial development, Saskatoon was slow in embracing the big-box store format that replaced the traditional shopping mall in the mid-to-late 1990s, with the city's first true "power centre" not opening until the early 2000s. One of the city's main commercial districts, 8th Street East, experienced an influx of new businesses in the early 2000s after a number of automobile dealerships relocated to a new "auto mall" on the city's south side, leaving large vacancies along 8th Street. The opening of the city's first power centre, Preston Crossing, in 2002–2003 saw several major retailers such as Wal-Mart Canada and Canadian Tire leave their original shopping mall locations in favour of the new sites.

Construction of a second power centre on the city's south side is under way. The development of these larger centres has led to something of a decrease in services in the downtown areas, with the few grocery stores in that region going out of business or closing their doors in favour of the larger stores in the peripheral regions of the city.

The downtown core is seeing increased development with projects such as River Landing, lofts and entertainment going ahead [River Landing project is delayed due to slowed housing demand and problems securing financing for additional condos]. Located in the downtown core, Midtown Plaza is the largest shopping centre in the city with Sears Canada and The Bay as anchors. The city is also home to Market Mall and The Centre on the east side, Confederation Mall on the west side and Lawson Heights Mall in the north end.

In 2008 and continuing into 2009 the vacancy rate for commercial real estate was on average 1%, with enclosed shopping centers averaging 4.5% and some areas at near full occupancy, such as the downtown core that average 0.4% in 2008.

Saskatoon has continued to see record retail sales growth exceed all other major cities in Canada, reaching 11% in 2008.

== Urban Reserves ==
Saskatoon is the home of Canada's first urban reserve, or Indian reserve created within existing city limits. (Other reserves had been absorbed into adjacent cities before this.) As part of the land claim process that was started in the 1950s and finalised in the 1992 Treaty Land Entitlement Framework Agreement, the Muskeg Lake Cree Nation claimed a vacant 33-acre (130,000 m^{2}) tract east of the Sutherland Industrial neighbourhood in 1984; the area was Crown land that had been intended for a correctional facility but never used. Following negotiations between the band, the City of Saskatoon, and the federal government, the area was designated as an Indian Reserve in 1988.

The City and the band formed an Urban Reserve Partnership, where the land is managed by the band but serviced by the City. The reserve is known as the McKnight Commercial Centre and is completely integrated into the neighbouring industrial area. It includes three buildings, with more than 100,000 square feet (9,300 m^{2}) of floor space, that house over 40 businesses employing over 300 people, and further expansion due in 2007–2008. Instead of the businesses paying municipal taxes to the City, the band collects these taxes (which by agreement are the same as they would be anywhere else in the City) as well as the sales taxes; the band then pays the City a "fee for municipal services", which equals the amount of the municipal taxes, and remits the sales taxes to their respective governments. In return, the City built all the infrastructure needed to develop and service the land, including additional road access, and provides all services, including snow removal, policing, and utilities. This ensures that on-reserve businesses do not receive a tax advantage, although their Status Indian employees benefit because on-reserve income is non-taxable. (Status Indians are also exempt from paying sales taxes on a reserve). The reserve includes a mixture of Aboriginal- and non-Aboriginal-owned businesses.

Following the success of the Muskeg Lake urban reserve, and following the same model, 28 more urban reserves have been created in Saskatchewan, including three each in Prince Albert, Yorkton and Fort Qu'Appelle.

The Sounding Sky urban reserve is the second urban reserve in Saskatoon. Owned by the One Arrow First Nation, it houses the Fire Creek gas station and confectionery at 20th Street and Avenue P. This land was declared an urban reserve in November 2005 and developed in 2006, replacing a small strip mall. There are three more parcels of land in Saskatoon that are owned by First Nations and expected to receive urban reserve status: Canterbury Towers (owned by the Yellow Quill First Nation) and Avord Towers (owned by The Battlefords Tribal Council), both office towers in the Central Business District; and an office complex in the Airport Business Area owned by the English River First Nation.

== Queen Elizabeth Power Station ==
The city receives its power from the main SaskPower power grid. Within the original 1958 boundaries of the city power is distributed by Saskatoon Light & Power while in the remainder of the system power distribution is handled by SaskPower. The city's nearest power generation plant is the Queen Elizabeth Power Station located on Saskatoon's southwestern outskirts on Spadina Crescent (south of the city dump entrance on Power Road). The station was built in the 1950s and named after Queen Elizabeth II in 1959. This is a natural gas fired station to meet peak demand. SaskPower base load facilities are primarily hydro electric and coal fired.
