= YRC =

YRC could mean:

- Yorkshire Ramblers' Club (YRC), a senior mountaineering and caving club based in Yorkshire, England, UK
- York Railway (reporting mark YRC), a short line railroad operating between York and Hanover, Pennsylvania, U.S.
- YRC Freight, subsidiary of Fortune 500 American trucking company, Yellow Corporation, which was known as YRC Worldwide until 2021
- A US Navy hull classification symbol: Submarine rescue chamber (YRC)
- Yokohama Rubber Company, a Japanese company active in the manufacture and sale of tyres for multiple vehicles, such as cars, trucks and agricultural, industrial and construction vehicles.
