= Reddaway (trucking company) =

American trucking company based in Oregon

USF Reddaway Inc.
- Trade name: Reddaway
- Formerly: Reddaway's Truck Line (1919–1989); TNT Reddaway Truck Line (1989–1996); USF Reddaway (1996–2011)
- Type: Subsidiary
- Industry: Transportation
- Founded: June 1919; 107 years ago in Oregon City, Oregon
- Founder: William Arthur "Art" Reddaway
- Defunct: 2023
- Fate: Chapter 11 bankruptcy of parent company Yellow Corporation
- Headquarters: Tualatin, Oregon, United States
- Number of locations: 50 service centers
- Area served: Western United States; Hawaii; British Columbia
- Key people: Bob Stone (president and CEO)
- Parent: TNT North America (1989–1992); TNT Freightways (1992–1996); USFreightways (1996–2003); USF Corp. (2003–2005); Yellow Corporation (2005–2023)
- Website: reddawayregional.com

USF Reddaway Inc. (which did business as Reddaway) was an American less than truckload (LTL) trucking company based in Tualatin, Oregon. Reddaway was a subsidiary of transportation and logistics holding company Yellow Corporation (formerly known as YRC Worldwide) and operated in the Western United States as well as British Columbia, Alaska, and Hawaii.

== History ==
=== Foundation and early history ===
USF Reddaway was founded in June 1919 by William Arthur "Art" Reddaway (1888–1957) as Reddaway's Truck Line, Inc. in Oregon City, Oregon with one Ford Model T truck. He managed the company with his wife, Ethel May Joslin Reddaway (1886–1956). His son, Walter Wayne “Walt” Reddaway (1915–1979), later succeeded him and led the company until his retirement in 1970. Walt later invented spray guard rain flaps for the trucking industry which he called The Reddaway System. He received a patent for the device in 1975.

=== TNT North America subsidiary ===
In 1989, TNT North America, the North American subsidiary of Australian conglomerate TNT Ltd., acquired Reddaway which at the time was operating 16 terminals all in the northwest US. The acquisition was part of TNT's expansion goal to own a trucking company for each region in the US. TNT already owned TNT Red Star Express Lines in the northeast, TNT Holland Motor Express in the midwest, and TNT Bestway Transportation in the southeast. Reddaway would be operated as an independent subsidiary under TNT North America called TNT Reddaway Truck Line.

=== Parent spun off from TNT ===
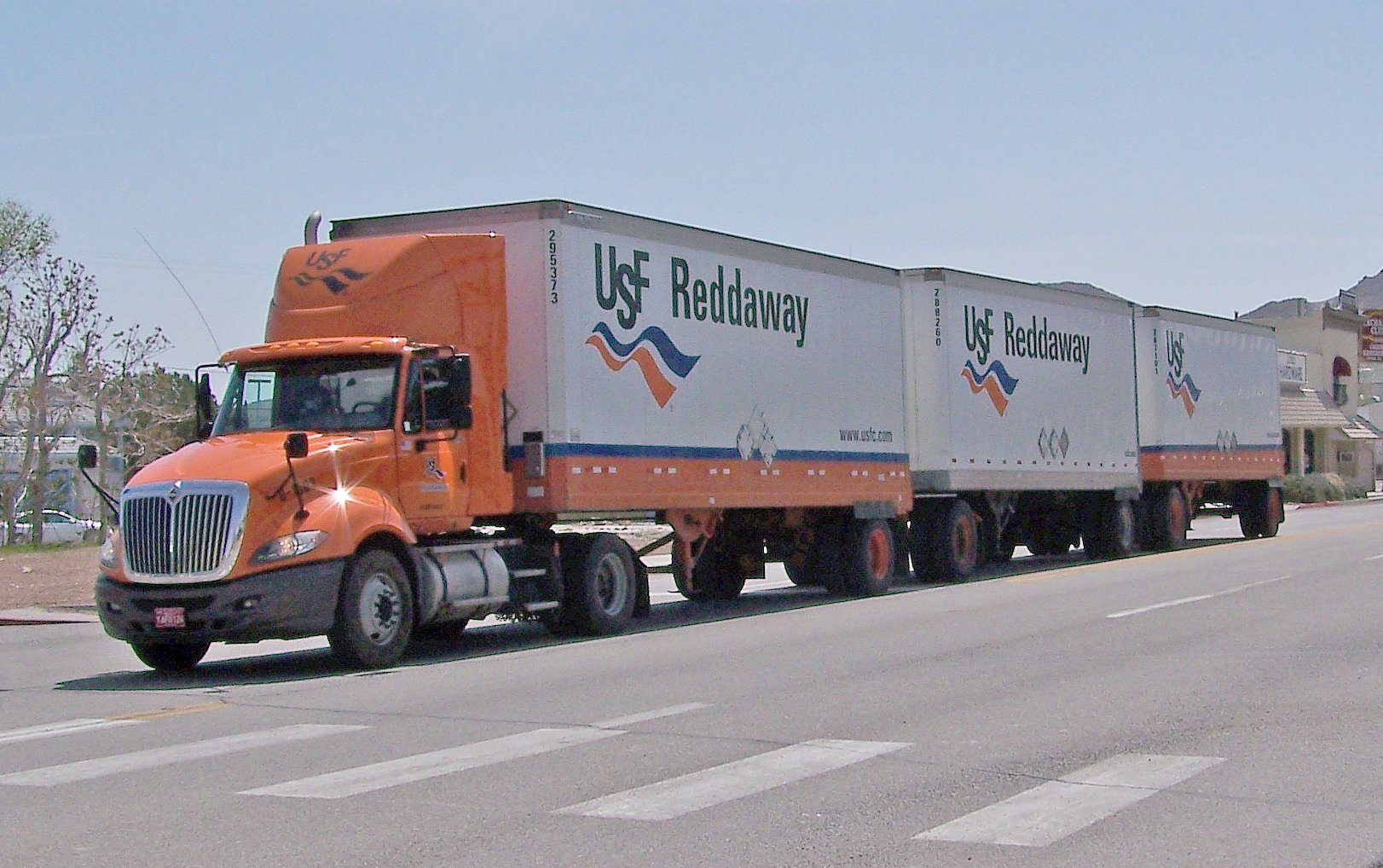
USF Reddaway truck

In 1992, TNT spun off its US trucking operations, renamed TNT Freightways Corp., expecting to raise US$240 million in a stock float of 80% of the company. At the time, the offering turned out to be the largest trucking company IPO in US history at US$280 million. The new company held six regional LTL carriers, including TNT Reddaway, and three logistics companies.

In January 1993, TNT Freightways bought out its former parent's remaining 20% ownership. However, in April 1994, TNT Holland and TNT Red Star were both impacted by the 1994 Teamsters strike which effected over 20 of the largest trucking companies across the US. Both TNT Freightways carriers were members of Trucking Management Inc. (TMI), a negotiations agency that represented most major US carriers. After several weeks of strikes exceeding 75,000 employees, both carriers pulled out of TMI and soon had their own deal in place with the Teamsters.

In 1996 TNT Freightways changed its name to USFreightways Corp. and swapped the "TNT" prefix in its subsidiaries names to "USF". The parent company also merged its TNT United Truck Lines subsidiary into what was at the same time renamed USF Reddaway Inc. USF Reddaway retained its headquarters in Clackamas County, Oregon. In 2003, USFreightways changed its name to USF Corp.

=== YRC/Yellow ownership ===
USF Reddaway grew into a super-regional trucking carrier by the early 2000s serving the western US and Canada. In 2005, its parent organization USF, was acquired by Yellow Roadway Corp, the largest LTL carrier in the US. At the time, USF was the third largest. The four USF regional LTL carriers continued as independent subsidiaries of a new Yellow Roadway subsidiary, YRC Regional Transportation. This group included USF Bestway, USF Dugan, USF Holland, and USF Reddaway plus truckload carrier USF Glen Moore and Roadway's regional LTL subsidiary, New Penn.

In 2006, Yellow Roadway Corp. changed its name to YRC Worldwide and in 2007 USF Bestway was merged into USF Reddaway leaving YRC Regional with USF Holland, USF Reddaway, USF Glen Moore, and New Penn as subsidiaries. The next year, YRC went through major reorganization. It combined its Yellow and Roadway subsidiaries into a single company, YRC Inc., and trimmed down services in YRC Regional's less profitable areas. This resulted in the closure of 21 USF Reddaway terminals in the southern US.

In 2011, additional restructuring followed. USF Reddaway, USF Holland, and USF Glen Moore all dropped the "USF" from their trade names and began doing business as Reddaway, Holland, and Glen Moore. Also in 2011, YRC sold Glen Moore to Celadon Trucking leaving only Reddaway, Holland, and New Penn as part of the YRC Regional group. The next year, Reddaway moved its headquarters from Oregon City in Clackamas County to Tualatin, also a suburb of Portland, and by 2021, the company said it operated 1,500 trucks (including box truck) and 5,000 trailers from 50 service centers with over 3,000 employees. YRC changed its name to Yellow Corporation in 2021 and announced plans to further integrate all of its brands by 2022.

On August 6, 2023, the Yellow Corporation officially announced that the company had filed for Chapter 11 bankruptcy protection in the state of Delaware after ceasing all operations six days before.

== See also ==
- Media related to Reddaway Freight at Wikimedia Commons
