= Economy of Regina, Saskatchewan =

Regina is the capital city of Saskatchewan, Canada. Its industry was originally largely confined to activities associated with its agricultural hinterland. Oil and natural gas, potash, kaolin, sodium sulphite and bentonite contribute a great part of the economy of Regina, and the surrounding area. The farm and agricultural component is still a significant part of the economy, but it is no longer the prime driver of the economy; provincially it has slipped to eighth overall, well behind the natural resources sectors. The Innovation Place Research Park near the University of Regina hosts several science and technology companies.

Regina's major industries include:

- Steel and Manufacturing
- Information Technology
- Energy and Environment
- Finances & Insurance
- agribusiness
- Agriculture

Regina also has some film and video production due to the Canada Saskatchewan Production Studios, the largest production facilities on the Canadian prairies. Feature films, weekly TV programs, and documentaries have been shot at the studio, such as CTV's Corner Gas and the 2005 movie Tideland by Terry Gilliam.

== Major employers ==
The largest employers in Regina are the provincial government and its Crown Corporations (e.g. Sasktel and Saskatchewan Government Insurance). There are some 4,700 private-sector businesses in Regina, engaged in financial services, manufacturing and processing, telecommunications, retail and wholesale services, and agricultural support; major employers in the private sector include Evraz Inc. (western Canada's largest steel manufacturer); Co-op Heavy Oil Upgraders; Kalium Chemicals (potash mining); Bayer CropScience (agricultural chemicals); Degelman Industries (agricultural implement manufacturing); Brandt Industries (industrial and farm equipment manufacturing); Viterra (Grain Handling) and ADP, Inc. (Payroll Centre).
