= Regina Qu'Appelle Health Region =

- Founded: 2002; 24 years ago
- Defunct: December 4, 2017
- Headquarters: Canada
- Areas served: Regina, Fort Qu'Appelle, Balcarres, Broadview, Indian Head, Moosomin, Wolseley
- Key people: R. W. (Dick) Carter, Chairperson; Brian Barber, Vice Chairperson
- Revenue: CA$1.1 billion
- Net income: CA$-3.5 million
- Total assets: CA$311.8 million (2017)
- Number of employees: 7,956 FTE (2017)
- Website: rqhealth.ca

The Regina Qu'Appelle Health Region was a health region in Saskatchewan, Canada. Primarily based in the city of Regina, the health region operated out of 8 hospitals, 10 community health centres, and numerous long-term care facilities and clinics.

As of December 4, 2017, it is considered defunct, as all health regions in Saskatchewan have been amalgamated into the Saskatchewan Health Authority.

== Major Referral Hospitals ==
The city of Regina has two major hospitals that serve the local community as well as being referral centers within the region and province:

- Pasqua Hospital
- Regina General Hospital

Pasqua Hospital
- Regina Qu'Appelle Health Region

Geography
- Location: 4101 Dewdney Avenue, Regina, Saskatchewan, Canada
- Coordinates: 50.454258°N 104.639237°W

Organization
- Care system: Public
- Type: Community

History
- Founded: 1907

Links
- Website: Pasqua Hospital
- Lists: Hospitals in Canada

Regina General Hospital
- Regina Qu'Appelle Health Region

Geography
- Location: 1440 14 Ave Regina, Saskatchewan, Canada
- Coordinates: 50.444878°N 104.600975°W

Organization
- Care system: Public
- Type: Community

History
- Founded: 1901

Links
- Website: Regina General Hospital
- Lists: Hospitals in Canada

Pasqua Hospital is a public hospital at 4101 Dewdney Avenue in Regina, Saskatchewan. Originally established as the Grey Nuns Hospital by the Grey Nuns. The hospital is operated by the Regina Qu'Appelle Health Region.

From 1948 to 1958 the hospital also housed the Provincial Laboratory.

Regina General Hospital is a public hospital at 1440 14th Avenue in Regina, Saskatchewan. It was opened in 1901 as the Victoria Hospital and had 25 beds initially. The Regina General Hospital is equipped to handle major life-saving emergencies and serves as southern Saskatchewan's major trauma centre.

== Regional Rural Hospitals ==
The following regional hospitals are located in larger communities within the region:

- All Nations' Healing Hospital (Fort Qu'Appelle)
- Balcarres Integrated Care Centre (Balcarres)
- Broadview Hospital (Broadview)
- Indian Head Hospital (Indian Head)
- Southeast Integrated Care Centre (Moosomin)
- Wolseley Memorial Hospital (Wolseley)
