= QA Technologies =

- Company type: Technology
- Industry: Telematics
- Founded: 2002
- Headquarters: Saskatoon, Saskatchewan, Canada
- Key people: Brock Eidem, CEO
- Products: AccutrAVL and AccutreQ.net
- Parent: DynaVenture Corp.
- Website: www.qatechnologies.com

QA Technologies Ltd. is a telematics company based in Saskatoon, Saskatchewan that develops fleet management technologies to the transportation industry. The company conducts in-house research and development and markets two main products, AccutrAVL and AccutreQ.net.

== History ==
QA Technologies was founded in 2002 by parent company DynaVenture Corp. The Saskatoon based technology company has provided custom built software to organizations such as Purolator Courier, SaskTel and Frito-Lay Canada.
