= Reimer Express Lines =

Former Canadian less than truckload freight company

Reimer Express Lines Ltd.
- Reimer Express logo used until approx. 2019
- Trade name: YRC Reimer
- Formerly: Reimer Express Lines Ltd. (1952–1997); Reimer Express (1997–2009)
- Type: Subsidiary
- Industry: Transportation
- Founded: 1952; 74 years ago in Steinbach, Manitoba, Canada
- Founders: Donald S. Reimer; Frank F. Reimer; Delbert Reimer; Gerald Reimer
- Defunct: 2019
- Fate: Reimer brand retired, brand merged with YRC Freight
- Headquarters: Winnipeg, Manitoba, Canada
- Parent: Neon Products (1968-1969); Neonex (1969-1971); Roadway Express (1997-2003); Yellow Roadway (2003–2006); YRC Worldwide (2006–2019)

Reimer Express Lines Ltd., which did business as YRC Reimer, was a Canadian less than truckload (LTL) carrier and subsidiary of YRC Worldwide based in Winnipeg, Manitoba. YRC retired the Reimer brand in 2019 merging it with YRC's largest LTL subsidiary, YRC Freight.

== History ==
=== Foundation and early history ===
Reimer was founded in 1952 when 19 year old Mennonite Donald S. Reimer convinced his father Frank F. Reimer and brothers Delbert Reimer and Gerald Reimer from the farming community of Steinbach, Manitoba to join him in starting a trucking business. The original route for the company was between Winnipeg and Windsor, Ontario, with Winnipeg being the head office. By December, Reimer offered services from Windsor to Vancouver and had extended eastward to Toronto by 1956. Reimer offered the first intermodal service in Canada in 1958 when they began providing this option for a Winnipeg to Fort William route via Canadian Pacific Railways.

=== Neonex ownership ===
In 1968 Reimer was acquired by Neon Products, a Canadian conglomerate renamed Neonex International in 1969, for approximately CA$3.8 million but continued operations as an independent subsidiary with D.S. Reimer remaining as president. Two years later, Vancouver-based Hunt Transport, which had been acquired by Neonex in 1969, was renamed Reimer Express (Pacific) though D.S. Reimer was made its president as well as the former Hunt, Reimer Express Lines, and Reimer's western division. The three operated separately but with cooperative interlining agreements allowing transport between networks.

=== Resumed independence ===
Shortly after Hunt was integrated into the Reimer group in 1971, the Reimer family bought the Reimer group of companies from Neonex. The combined operations covered 6 provinces from Quebec to British Columbia and employed about 800. By the next year Reimer's companies employed 1,000 and had revenues of CA$30 million.

In 1985 Reimer acquired Mississauga-based Inter-City Truck Lines (Canada) which made Reimer one of the top five largest trucking company in Canada and extended its services into the eastern United States. In 1987, Reimer became the fourth largest trucking company in Canada when it took over the western Canada trucking operations of Groupe Brazeau after that company's acquisition by Cabano d'Anjou Group.

By 1990, Reimer had 2,500 employees in companies including Inter-City, Canadian Great Western Express, and Fleet Express Services. It also operated courier Fast-Pac and specialized trucking operations Big Freight and Fast-as-Flight.

=== Roadway, Yellow, and YRC ===
In 1997, Reimer was acquired by American trucking company Roadway Express for US$15 million and changed its name to Reimer Express. Reimer continued as an independent subsidiary of Roadway and Roadway's Canadian operations were shut down and merged into Reimer's. At the time, Reimer was the second largest trucking company in Canada at CA$117 million revenue in 1996 and Roadway was the second largest in the United States with revenues of about US$2.3 billion trailing only Yellow Corporation.

By the time Yellow Corporation acquired Roadway in 2003, Yellow was the second largest American trucking company and Roadway was the largest. The acquisition cost Yellow US$1.1 billion and made Reimer Express a subsidiary of the newly formed parent company, Yellow Roadway Corp. In 2006, Yellow Roadway changed its name to YRC Worldwide and in 2009, Yellow Canada's operations were merged into Reimer which was renamed YRC Reimer.

In 2012, YRC retired the Reimer name rebranding its Canadian operations YRC Freight. This move marked the end of independent operations for Reimer.
