= Yellow Corporation =

American transportation holding company (1929–2023)

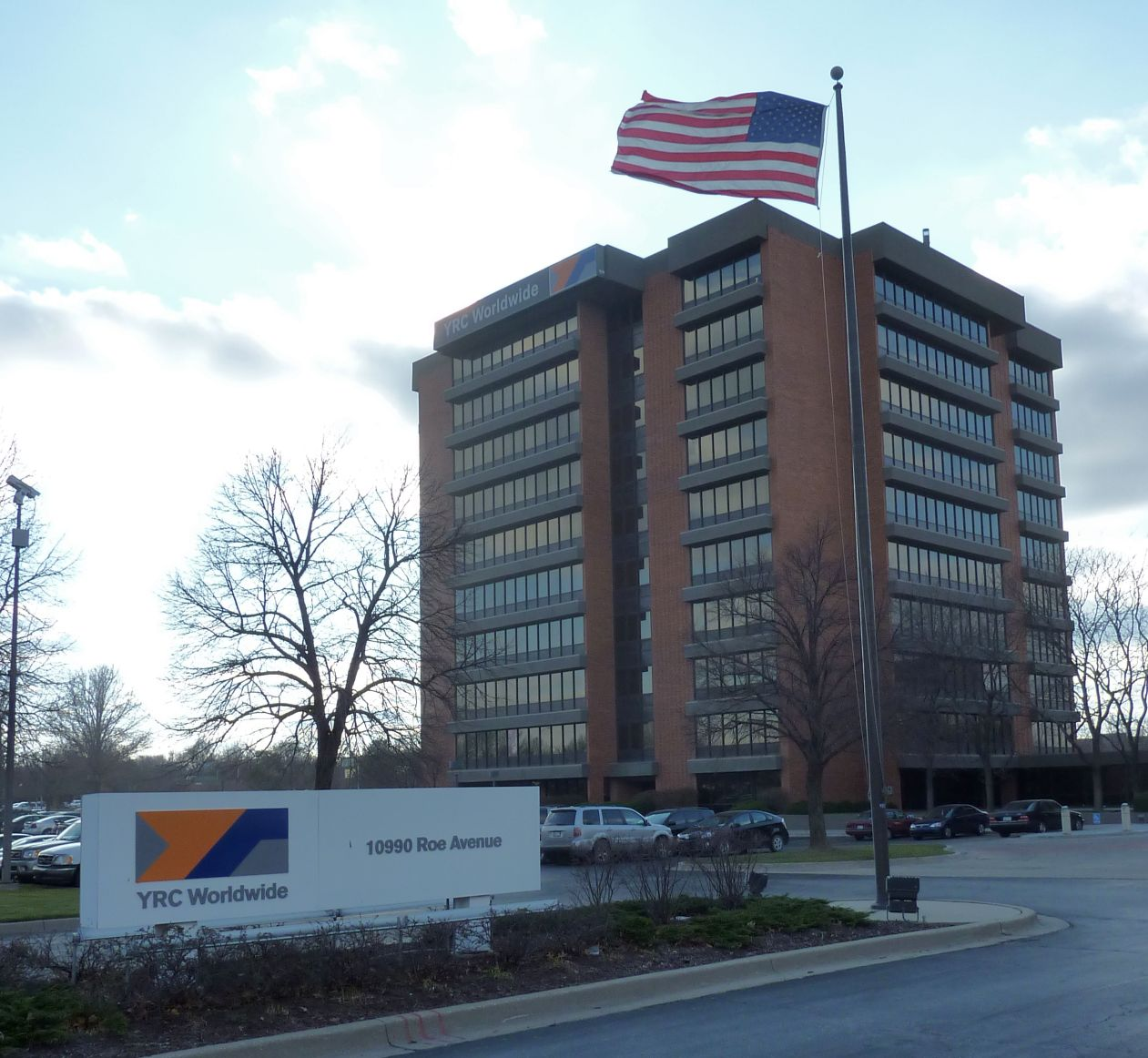
- YRC Freight headquarters in Overland Park, Kansas
- Formerly: YRC Worldwide, Inc. (2006–2021); Yellow Roadway Corporation (2003–2006)
- Type: Public
- Traded as: Expert Market: YELLQ; OTC Pink: YELLQ; Nasdaq: YELL
- Industry: Transportation
- Founded: 1929; 97 years ago
- Founders: G.C. "Cleve" Harrell; A.J. Harrell
- Defunct: 2023
- Headquarters: Overland Park, Kansas, United States
- Area served: North America
- Key people: Darren Hawkins (CEO)
- Revenue: US$5.2447 billion (2022)
- Operating income: US$197.8 million (2022)
- Net income: US$21.8 million (2022)
- Total assets: US$2.2793 billion (2022)
- Total equity: US$–381.5 million (2022)
- Owner: U.S. Treasury (29.6%, since 2020)
- Number of employees: c. 30,000 (December 2022)
- Subsidiaries: YRC Freight; Holland; Reddaway; New Penn; HNRY Logistics
- Website: myyellow.com

Yellow Corporation was an American transportation holding company headquartered in Overland Park, Kansas. Its subsidiaries included national less than truckload (LTL) carrier YRC Freight; regional LTL carriers New Penn, Holland, and Reddaway; and freight brokerage HNRY Logistics. From 2006 to February 2021, Yellow was known as YRC Worldwide.

At 12:00 pm on Sunday, July 30, 2023, the company ceased operations due to financial problems. On August 6, 2023, it filed for Chapter 11 bankruptcy protection. It owes $730 million to the federal government, which owns 30% of the corporation, as a result of the $700 million pandemic loan Yellow received in 2020. It had 30,000 employees, 22,000 of whom were members of the International Brotherhood of Teamsters. The financial problems existed since 2000, when the company started taking on large debt loads while acquiring competitors but failed to achieve efficiencies of integrating the separate companies into one network, with the company stating that their union contracts were one factor blocking this integration. The company has only had three profitable quarters since 2009. An auction for the Yellow properties took place in November 2023.

== History ==
=== Foundation and early history ===
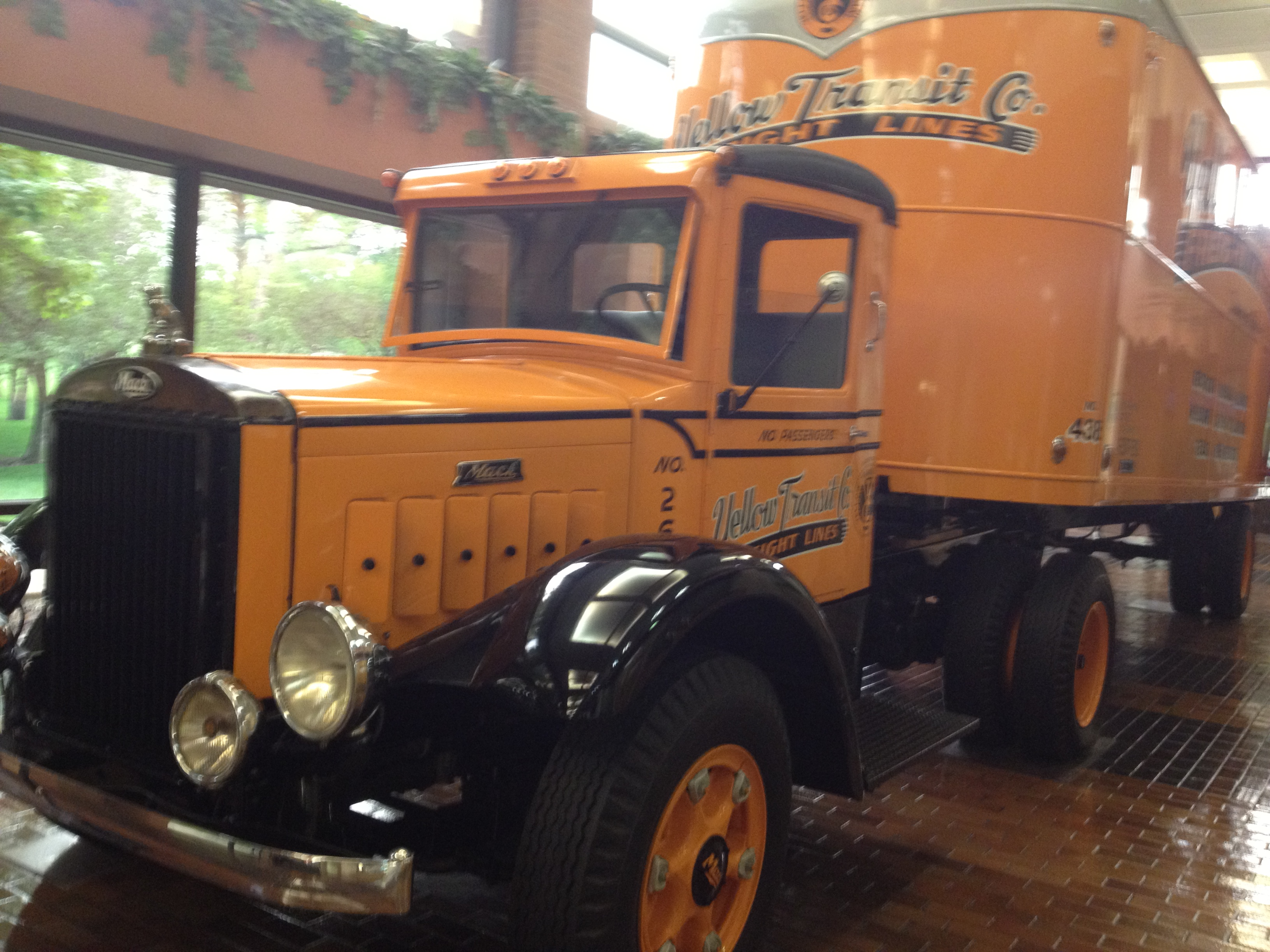
1939 Yellow Transit Freight Lines truck

In 1906, Grover Cleveland "Cleve" Harrell (1884–1942) started what was to become the Yellow Cab Company of Oklahoma with a horse-drawn hack and a team of horses in Oklahoma City. After a year, he bought a Model T Ford. People were willing to pay more to ride in an automobile. After World War I, he bought two more cars and hired a relief driver. In 1918, Harrell painted one of his cars yellow. Although ridiculed by other cab drivers, he was hauling more passengers than anyone else, so he painted all his cars yellow and business boomed. Harrell trademarked the name Yellow Cab in Oklahoma. Later, John Hertz copied the Yellow Cab in Chicago and obtained the national trademark for the use of the name.

Harrell's older brother, A. J. Harrell (1883–1972), had followed him to Oklahoma City and been successful in the operation of a horse and mule business during World War I. Cleve needed extra capital for expansion, so he formed a partnership with A. J. The company's offices were moved to 113 S. Santa Fe, and their younger brother, Marvin Harrell, and their father, Jake Harrell, were added to the payroll. The partnership started a cross-country bus line connecting Oklahoma City and Tulsa, which was later sold to Pickwick Bus Company of Tulsa. Cleve established the Capital Hill Bus Lines for the southern part of Oklahoma City, which he successfully operated for several months before selling it to the Oklahoma Street Railway Company.

When oil was discovered in the Oklahoma City area, mules were needed for work in digging slush pits, so the Harrell brothers bought mules and, in 1929, established the Yellow Transit Freight Lines to serve small manufacturers for whom freight was slow and express rates were prohibitive. By 1933, with the New Deal and the NIRA, most businesses came under government regulation in an attempt to increase employment. Cleve, together with taxicab operators from other parts of the country, met in Washington, D.C. to formulate a regulatory code, but were not successful. Cleve then devised his own code and got government confirmation.

About this time, the Harrell brothers dissolved the partnership. Cleve took the taxicabs in the trade-out, as well as the Yellow Cab Dynamic Gasoline Company. He sold the taxicab business in 1940 to Eddie Fuller, who operated the Y and Y Cab Co., and maintained ownership of the gasoline company until his death on December 3, 1942. A. J. took control of the freight lines, which he operated for many years. The company remained small until 1952, when an ownership group led by George E. Powell Sr. bought the freight company. During this time, Yellow helped pioneer the concept of consolidating small freight shipments into trailer loads.

In 1968, the company name was changed from Yellow Transit Freight Lines to Yellow Freight System Inc. During the deregulation of interstate trucking in the 1980s, Yellow Freight System embarked on a massive restructuring by creating new distribution centers across the country to better serve customers. The company changed its name to Yellow Corporation in 1992, when it created a parent company, with Yellow Transportation, Inc. as its largest division.

=== Roadway Corp. acquisition ===
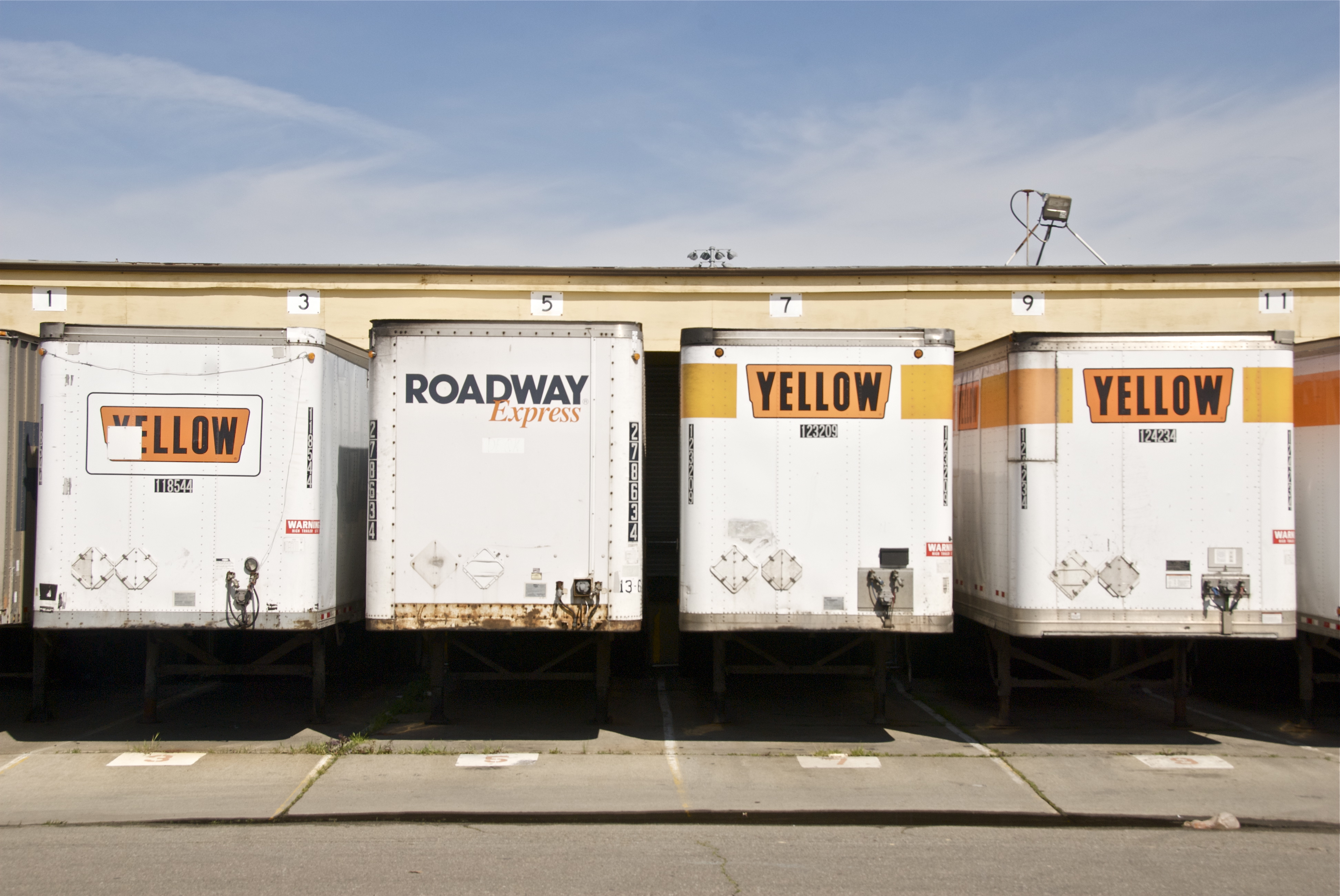
YRC trailers with the vintage Yellow logo in 2010

In December 2003 Yellow Corporation, at the time the second largest LTL carrier in the US, acquired the largest, Roadway Corporation, for US$1.05 billion. Roadway had been spun off from its former parent, holding company Roadway Services Inc. (RSI), in 1995 and operated as an independent, publicly traded company since then. The purchase included Roadway's national operation, Roadway Express, northeast regional LTL subsidiary, New Penn, and Canadian LTL operation, Reimer Express. A new holding company, Yellow Roadway Corporation, was formed based at Yellow's headquarters in Overland Park to serve as the parent company for both Roadway Corp. and Yellow Corp.

The purchase announcement came less than a year after the bankruptcy of the nation's then-third largest LTL carrier, Consolidated Freightways, meaning the Yellow-Roadway merger would leave the industry with a major gap from Yellow Roadway's estimated over US$6 billion in revenue to FedEx Freight and Con-way, both around US$2 billion, followed by Overnite Transportation and Arkansas Best both around US$1.3 billion. All but Yellow Roadway and Arkansas Best were non-union. The deal was therefore subject to heightened regulatory and union scrutiny. As expected, the merger's financial impact was significant. Yellow Corp. posted 2003 revenue of $3.07 billion, and Yellow Roadway Corp. had 2004 revenue of $6.8 billion.

=== USF acquisition ===
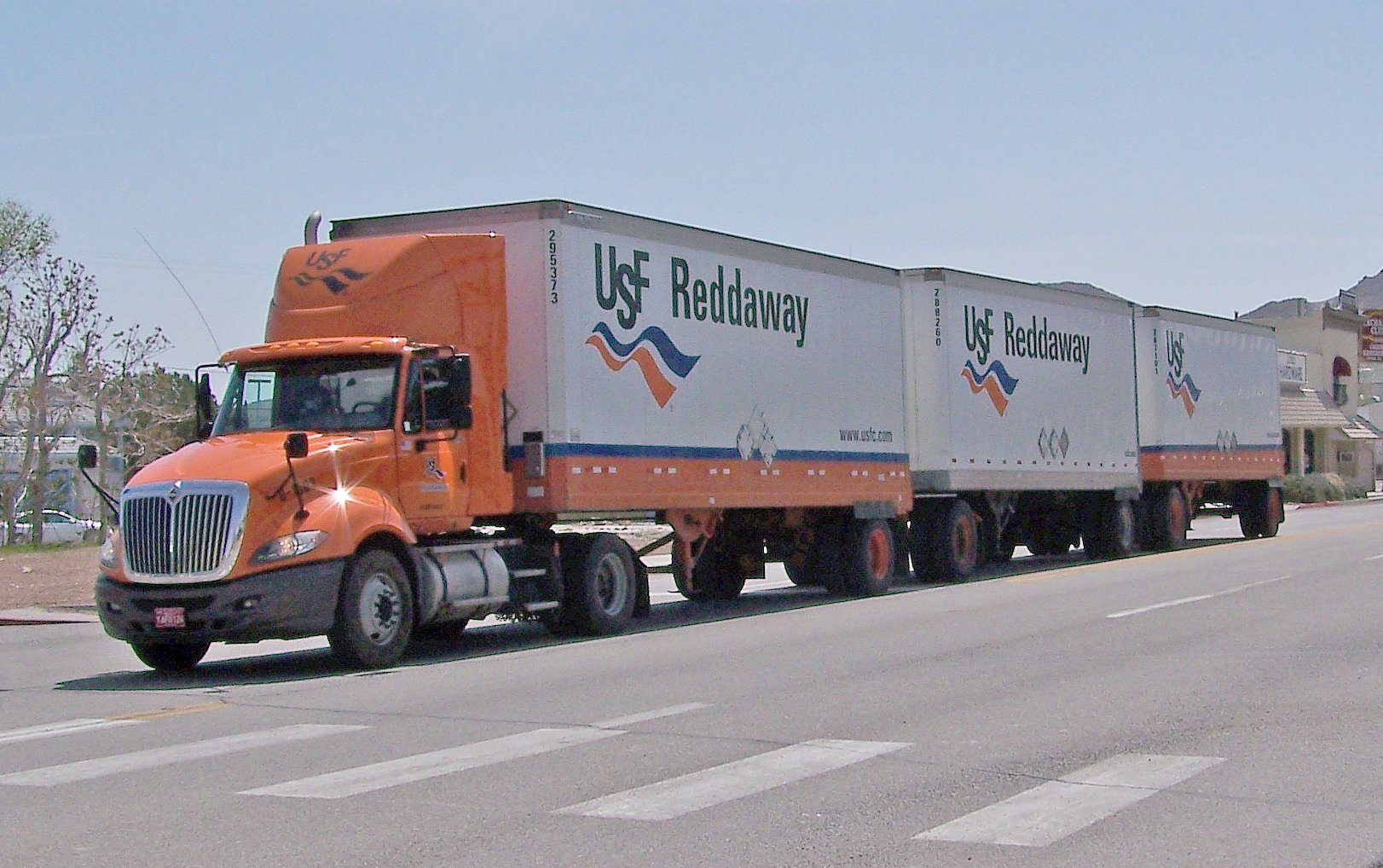
USF Reddaway, now Reddaway, was acquired by Yellow Roadway as part of its acquisition of USF.

Just a few years after the Roadway merger, the company made another significant acquisition in 2005 with the US$1.5 billion acquisition of Holland, Michigan-based LTL carrier USF Corp. and its subsidiaries. This brought Yellow Roadway's revenue to a high of $9.9 billion in 2006 with associated profit increases from $40 million in 2003 to $184 million in 2004 to a high of $288 million in 2005. USF had experienced financial troubles prior to the acquisition but had still reported over US$2.3 billion in revenue in each of the two prior years.

With the USF acquisition, Yellow Roadway restructured itself, forming a new subsidiary, YRC Regional Transportation headquartered in Roadway's home town of Akron, Ohio. This new group replaced former New Penn and Roadway Express parent, Roadway Group. Roadway Express would now be a direct subsidiary of Yellow Roadway. New Penn would be part of the new regional group which would also include USF subsidiaries USF Holland, USF Reddaway, USF Dugan, and USF Bestway. It also included USF Glen Moore, USF's truckload unit. The operations of USF Logistics were absorbed into Yellow Roadway's logistics unit, Meridian IQ.

Yellow Roadway also made forays into the international market, particularly China, expanding beyond its existing Canadian operations through Reimer. In September 2005, the company purchased half of Chinese freight-forwarding company JHJ International Transportation Co. Ltd. and in August 2008, bought a 65 percent share of Chinese Shanghai Jiayu Logistics Co.

=== As YRC Worldwide ===
YRC Worldwide logo used until February 2021

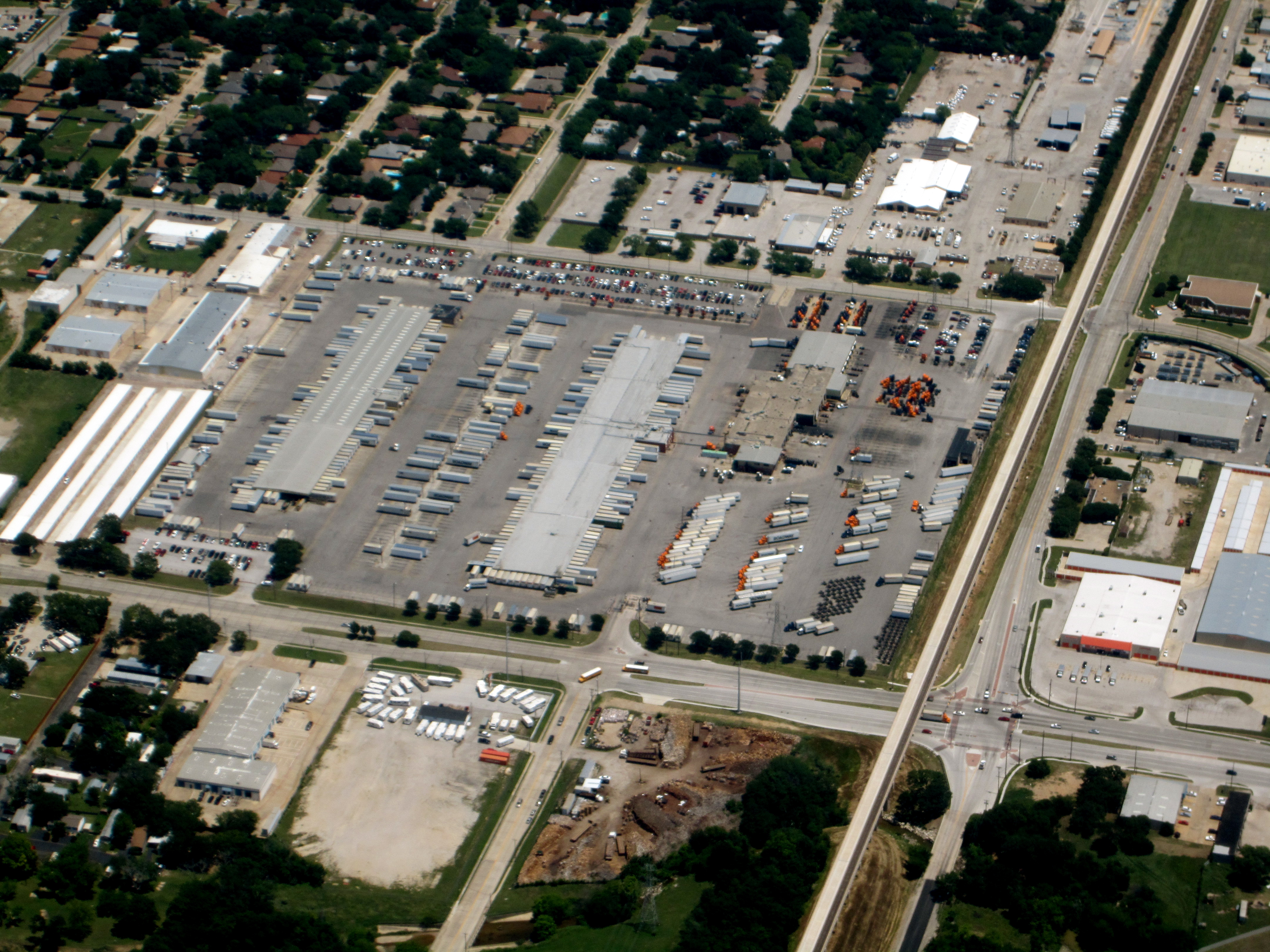
YRC Freight terminal in Irving, Texas

Following these international investments, Yellow Roadway Corp., the parent company of Roadway, Yellow, and other subsidiaries, changed its name to YRC Worldwide in 2006.

YRC reported a net loss of $974 million for its 2008 fiscal year. In 2009 it again reported a net loss of $622 million. Towards the end of 2009, YRC narrowly averted having to file for bankruptcy protection by successfully persuading its bondholders to exchange their $470 million in bond notes for roughly 94% of the company's shares. Concurrent with more recent manufacturing sector growth and recovery, since the fourth quarter of 2009, YRC again began approaching a net positive balance sheet. Nonetheless, its share price declined in year 2010 more than 80%, raising in 2011 suspicions of death spiral financing. In September 2011 the company completed a financial restructuring that essentially wiped out any shareholder equity. All employees, Teamsters included, took massive pay cuts in order to keep YRC in business.

In March 2009, Yellow Transportation and Roadway formally merged to create YRC Inc. and Yellow Canada's operations were merged into Reimer Express to become YRC Reimer.

On December 15, 2011, YRC Worldwide sold a significant portion of Glen Moore including the Carlisle, Pennsylvania, terminal to Celadon of Indianapolis, Indiana, and in 2012 YRC Inc. began doing business as YRC Freight.

On July 1, 2020, the U.S. Department of Treasury announced that the federal government would lend YRC Worldwide $700 million as an emergency loan under the CARES Act. In exchange for the emergency loan, the Department of Treasury announced that U.S. taxpayers would acquire a 29.6 percent equity stake in the company. The Department of Treasury received permission from the U.S. Congress to take ownership stakes in YRC Worldwide to ensure that taxpayer funds would not be misspent. An October 2020 report by the Congressional Oversight Commission concluded that no justifications had been provided for why YRC Worldwide was entitled to receive $700 million.

In April 2022, Democrats on the Congressional Select Subcommittee on the Coronavirus released a report claiming the loan violated the terms of the CARES Act, and that it resulted from lobbying and close connections with former US president Donald Trump. YRC reportedly got the loan on national security grounds, over the objections of the Defense Department that the company's services could be replaced by better providers, and that the company was in the middle of a False Claims Act in which it was accused of overbilling the government and making false statements.

=== As Yellow Corporation ===
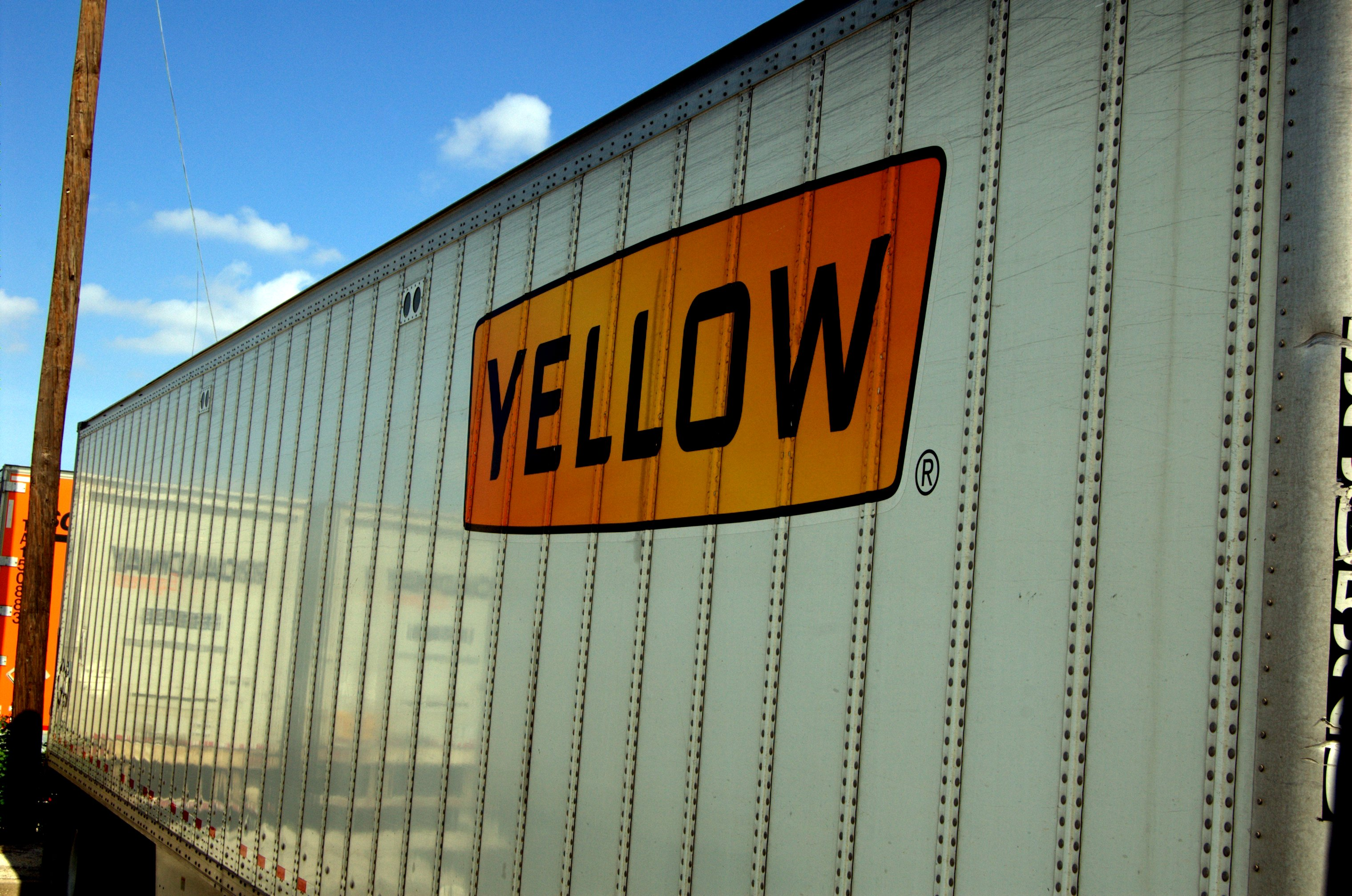
In 2021, YRC changed its name back to Yellow.

Given that it had divested its international interests and refocused on North American LTL operations, YRC Worldwide changed its name on February 4, 2021, this time returning to the name Yellow Corporation. Its Nasdaq ticker symbol changed to "YELL" a few days later. While it did not immediately change the corporate structure, the renaming was part of a larger restructuring Yellow had started in 2019 with the goal of combining all of its regional LTL services into a single network by 2022. During the COVID-19 pandemic in 2020, Yellow received a $700 million federal loan as part of a rescue package. In return, the U.S. Treasury took a 29.6% stake in the company's shares. In June 2023, a probe by the U.S. Congress found that the company should not have received the loan, as its survival was not "critical to maintaining national security".

==== 2023 closure and bankruptcy ====
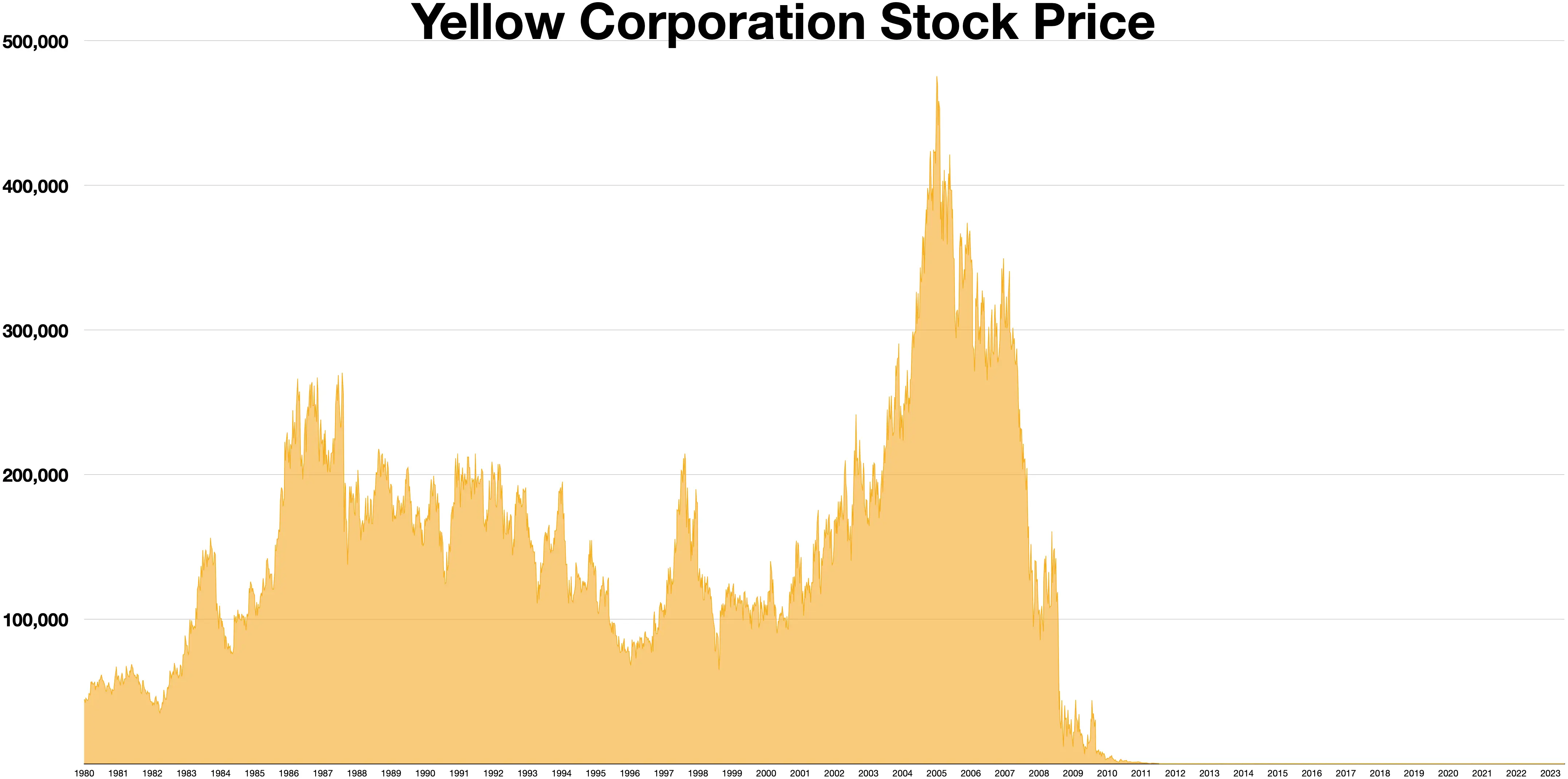
Yellow Corporation stock price

At the end of July 2023, Yellow reportedly was in the process of ceasing all operations in anticipation of filing for bankruptcy. The bankruptcy was seen as the culmination of mainly long-term factors such as high debt ($1.3 billion due in Q4 of 2024, with $729 million of that due to the federal government as of Q1 2023), which started increasing after Yellow began acquiring other trucking companies in the early 2000s. The company previously accused the International Brotherhood of Teamsters of blocking a restructuring plan that could have saved it. The threat of a strike by the union in June and July after the company failed to make a $50 million benefits payment to the pension fund caused uncertainty in the market, leading to freight volumes decreasing by nearly 80%. The company's statements of low cash reserves during the union negotiations also caused other customers to move to rival carriers such as FedEx and ABF Freight. By July 31, 2023, MFN Partners LP, a Boston-based hedge fund, had accumulated a 25% stake in the company and become the second largest owner after the federal government, with a 30% stake, although Kansas City's American City Business Journals noted that the company will likely file for bankruptcy. On August 6, 2023, the Yellow Corporation officially announced that the company and all of its affiliates had filed for Chapter 11 bankruptcy protection in the state of Delaware. Yellow Corporation's stock was delisted from the Nasdaq on August 16, 2023. In November 2023, Yellow's properties were put up for auction. Multiple carriers and real-estate investors were winning bidders in a sale with a combined total of $1.9B across 128 owned properties and two leased properties.

In December 2023, 17 terminals of Yellow Corporation were sold to former subsidiary Saia in the Chapter 11 bankruptcy sale for $235.7 million. On December 12, 2023, XPO, Inc. got approval to acquire 28 service centers of Yellow Corporation as a part of Chapter 11 bankruptcy for $870 million.

== Color ==
In 1929, A. J. Harrell enlisted the help of E. I. du Pont de Nemours and Company to improve highway safety by determining the vehicle color that would be the most visible on the nation's highways. After the review was completed, it was determined that the color of the Swamp Holly Orange would be most visible from the greatest distance. Swamp Holly Orange became the color used on all company tractors.

== See also ==
- MIQ Logistics – former subsidiary YRC Logistics
- Reimer Express Lines – former Canadian subsidiary of Roadway, now YRC Freight Canada
- Caliber System – former Roadway Express parent
- Yellow Freight 300 – NASCAR race sponsored by Yellow Freight in 1999
- Yellow Transportation 300 - NASCAR race sponsored by Yellow at the Kansas Speedway from 2005 to 2007
- Saia – former subsidiary
