= DynaVenture =

Canadian business

DynaVenture Corp.
- Company type: Portfolio Company
- Predecessor: DynaVest Corp.
- Founded: 1949
- Founder: Harold N. Eidem
- Headquarters: Saskatoon, Saskatchewan, Canada
- Area served: North America, South America Caribbean
- Key people: Brian Eidem CEO, Earl Eidem Vice President
- Number of employees: 175
- Website: www.dynaventure.com

DynaVenture Corp. was formed in 2000 by second generation family members Brian and Earl Eidem and Jo-Ann Thompson. Founding father Harold Eidem started the 60 year dynasty in 1948 in his Vancouver home with his first business Bearing and Transmission Supply (B&T). In 1973 Harold Eidem set up B&T Holdings Ltd to provide centralized services and act as the parent company to all of their business’ locations. In 1976, Harold Eidem died and the ownership of the company was transferred to his sons Brian and Earl Eidem and daughter Jo-Ann Thompson. In 1981, B&T Holdings changed its name to DynaVest Corp. to better indicate the new direction of the companies. In 2000, the Eidem family sold three major components of their holdings to Applied Industrial Technologies. That same year the company would again change names, DynaVest became DynaVenture and the Eidem family have since increased their holdings in technology and engineering companies.

== History ==
At the end of World War II in February 1948, Harold Eidem left a job at a bearing company to start Bearing and Transmission Supply out of his home in Vancouver British Columbia. One of Harold's first inventory purchases, from the U.S. Navy, was impounded at the Canadian/US border due to an $1800 Canadian customs bill. Having spent all of his savings on the inventory, Harold turned to his long-time friend Norman Hnatuk living in Saskatoon, Saskatchewan to pay the duty. Norman got the inventory out of the bond and became a partner in the Bearing and Transmission enterprise.

In November 1948 Norman Hnatuk officially joined Harold in Vancouver and one year later opened a second location in Saskatoon Saskatchewan. In 1950 the B&T Vancouver location was sold to Norman's brother Bill Hnatuk. Harold then joined Norm in Saskatoon where the two grew the company within Saskatchewan. The company has since expanded to have locations throughout North America.

=== Growth and acquisitions ===
1950s

- B&T created formal distributorships with Hoover Ball and Bearing Co., Orange Roller Bearing Co., Morris Chain, Garlock, and SKF.
- 1956-B&T Ltd was incorporated
- 1957-Sales reached $356,000 doubling from 1956
- 1957-B&T Ltd.Regina was formed

1960s

- 1961-Convey IT a materials handling division is formed
- 1964-B&T was divided into two main divisions: Saskatoon and North Saskatchewan operated under Norm Hnatuk and Regina and South Saskatchewan operated under Harold Eidem
- 1965-B&T Prince Albert and Esterhazy were formed
- 1967-B&T Regina acquired Precision Bearings Company of Yorkton Saskatchewan

1970s

- 1970-B&T opened Estevan location to accommodate SaskPower coal fire electric power generating stations
- 1972-Curtis Hoover, a hydraulic (Vickers) distributor/service business in Saskatchewan was acquired, and consequently the company established a new operating unit with locations in Regina and Saskatoon named B&T Fluid Power Ltd.
- 1972-B&T Fluid Power Ltd. Prince George, British Columbia opened
- 1973-Harold Eidem purchased Norm Hnatuk interests in companies
- 1973-Harold Eidem formed B&T Holdings Ltd as parent company of Bearing & Transmission and B&T Fluid Power
- 1974-B&T Holdings purchased Hard Chrome Services in Regina
- 1976-B&T Holdings purchased Superior Hard Chrome Inc.in Saskatoon
- 1976-Bearing & Transmission Lloydminster Alberta opened
- 1976-Superior Hard Chrome opened a Regina location
- 1976-Harold Eidem died
- 1976-Brian and Earl Eidem and Jo-Ann Thompson the second generation take over reigns of company
- 1977-B&T Fluid Power opens a branch in Prince Albert
- 1979-B&T Fluid Power purchase Progressive Air & Hydraulics in Vancouver
- 1979-B&T Fluid Power open a Winnipeg location
- 1978-B&T opens Prince Albert, Saskatchewan location

1980s

- 1980-B&T Fluid Power form a partnership with H&M Fluid Power and open the first Alberta branch in Edmonton
- 1981-B&T Holdings changes name to DynaVest Corporation
- 1981-Convey IT locations open in Saskatoon and Regina, Saskatchewan
- 1982-B&T Fluid Power and all its past acquisitions changed their name to HyPOWER Systems.
- 1986-B&T Drayton Valley and Fort McMurray Alberta opens
- 1987-B&T Winnipeg Manitoba opens
- 1987-Convey-It WinnipegManitoba opened
- 1988-B&T Calgary, Lethbridge, Medicine Hat, and Peace River Alberta locations open

1990s

- 1990-B&T Rubber is formed in Regina
- 1992-All Agro Winnipeg opens
- 1991-HyPOWER Systems open a second Alberta branch in Calgary
- 1992-The Hydraulic division of Calgary Hose & Hydraulic was purchased and merged into the HyPOWER Calgary branch
- 1992-Fluid Clarification Inc formed with locations in Calgary, Edmonton and Vancouver
- 1994-Brian, Earl and Jo-Ann purchase Adanac Equipment in Delta British Columbia
- 1994-HyPOWER opens a location in Campbell River to supply fluid power products to the forest and marine industry on Vancouver Island
- 1995-B&T Grande Prairie opens
- 1996-All Agro Edmonton opens
- 1997-B&T Prince George and Kelowna, British Columbia open
- 1997-Campbell River, British Columbia opens the first B&T and HyPOWER combination branch
- 1998-B&T purchased the Sproule Bearings company with branches in Calgary, Lethbridge and Medicine Hat
- 1998-B&T branches open in Peace River, Alberta and Kamloops, British Columbia
- 1998-HyPOWER opens a Grande Prairie facility
- 1999-All Agro opens Saskatoon, Saskatchewan branch

2000s

- 2000-DynaVest sells Bearing & Transmission (B&T), All Agro and HyPOWER to Applied Industrial Technologies
- 2000-DynaVest changes name to DynaVenture Corp. to refine its purpose
- 2000-DynaVest purchased Belt Tech in Saskatoon and changed its name to B&T Rubber
- 2002-Superior Hard Chrome changes name to DynaIndustrial Inc.
