= MIQ Logistics =

Former American third party logistics company

- Type: Privately Held Company
- Industry: Logistics
- Predecessor: YRC Logistics
- Defunct: 2019
- Fate: Acquired
- Headquarters: Overland Park, Kansas
- Number of locations: 146 (2018)
- Area served: North America; Asia; Europe; Africa; Australia; New Zealand; Middle East; Latin America
- Key people: John E Carr (President and CEO); Brenda Stasiulis (CFO)
- Services: Global Freight Forwarding; Customs Brokerage; Supply Chain Management; Project Logistics; Origin Consolidation; Global Trade Management; Warehouse Management; Global Business Intelligence
- Parent: Austin Ventures
- Website: www.miq.com

MIQ Logistics was a third party logistics company headquartered in Overland Park, Kansas, United States. MIQ Logistics operated in global freight forwarding, customs brokerage, supply chain management, project logistics, origin consolidation, global trade management, warehouse management, and global business intelligence, with offices in North America, Asia, Europe, Africa, Australia, New Zealand, the Middle East, and Latin America.

== History ==
In 2010, YRC Worldwide sold YRC Logistics to private equity firm Austin Ventures for $38.7 million. Austin Ventures shortly after the purchase rebranded the unit as MIQ Logistics.

In 2011, MIQ Logistics announced their acquisition of The Logistics Corporation Ltd. based out of the United Kingdom.

In 2017, MIQ Logistics sold its North American domestic transportation business to an undisclosed buyer.

In 2009, MIQ Logistics volunteered to deliver a piece of steel from the fallen World Trade Center Towers from Port Authority of New York and New Jersey to Overland Park, Kansas.

== Sustainability ==
MIQ used the United States Environmental Protection Agency's (EPA) Shipper Fleet Performance Model aiding shippers in estimating greenhouse gas emissions by road and rail, and expanding to air carriers and ships. Other environment initiatives included adding reusable totes for use in chemical shipments, eliminating the need manufacture and dispose of steel drums. Hydrogen cell battery forklifts were also evaluated as part of their material handling equipment options.

== Acquisitions ==
In 2011, MIQ acquired UK-based, retail logistics company The Logistics Corporation Ltd., offering services including, but not limited to, retail warehousing and fulfilling services.

In 2016, MIQ Logistics purchased assets in Miami-based Alfa Logistics and Colombian-based Kronos Logistics with the goal to increase their Latin American presence.

In 2017, MIQ Logistics offloaded their North American domestic transportation business to an undisclosed buyer as they shifted their focus entirely to international shipping and logistics services.

In April 2019, Noatum Logistics completed the acquisition of MIQ.

== See also ==
- Link Logistics
