= Roadway Express =

Former American trucking company

Roadway Express, Inc.
- Type: Subsidiary
- Founded: 1930; 96 years ago in Akron, Ohio
- Founders: Carroll Roush; Galen Roush
- Defunct: 2009
- Fate: Merged with YRC subsidiary Yellow
- Successor: YRC, Inc.
- Headquarters: Akron, Ohio, United States
- Parent: Roadway Services (1982–1995); Roadway Corp. (2001–2003); Yellow Roadway (2003–2006); YRC Worldwide (2006–2009)
- Website: roadway.com

Roadway Express, Inc. was an American less than truckload (LTL) trucking company. Roadway Express and its holding company, Roadway Corporation, were acquired by logistics holding company Yellow Corporation in 2003, and the parent companies were merged to form Yellow Roadway Corporation, later renamed YRC Worldwide. In 2009, Roadway Express was merged with YRC's other national LTL carrier, Yellow Freight, to form YRC, Inc.

== History ==
=== Foundation and early history ===
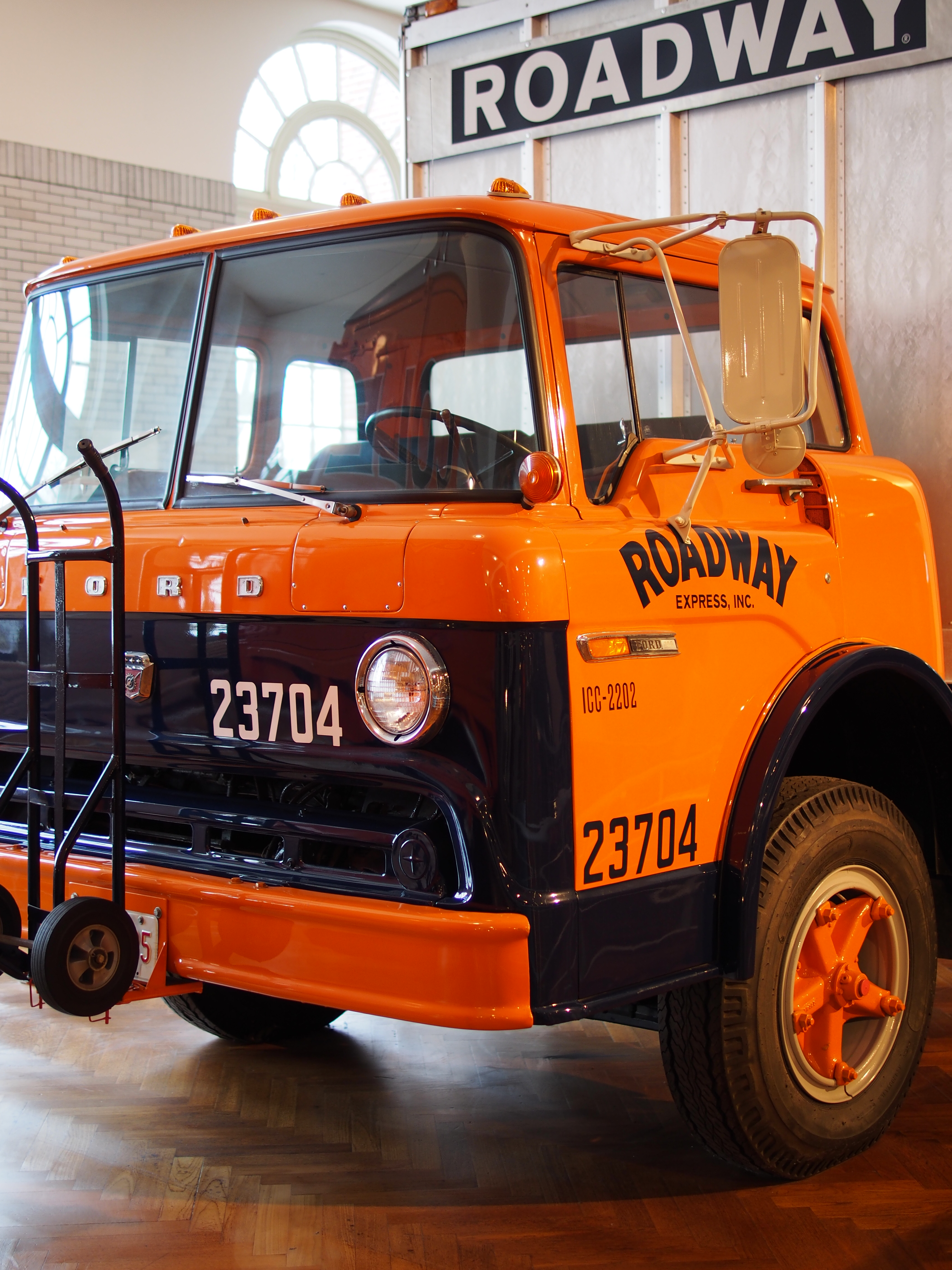
A vintage Roadway Express truck

In 1930 in Akron, Ohio, Carroll Roush and Charles "Chick" Morrison founded R & M Transportation to serve the city's rubber industry by transporting tires from Akron manufacturers to automobile companies. Roush's brother, Galen Roush, joined the company soon after its founding. Then, in December of 1930, the Roush brothers founded another company, Roadway Express, Inc. Roadway quickly outgrew R & M, and the latter was merged into the former in 1932. While Roadway began with an owner-operator model and primarily focused on truckload shipments, by the mid-1940s, it had shifted entirely to company-owned vehicles and mostly to less-than-truckload (LTL) shipping. Roadway became a publicly traded company in 1956 when Carroll Roush sold his shares to the public. In subsequent years, it expanded across the United States and by 1982 was operating over 500 terminals nationwide.

=== Roadway Services Inc. ===
Due to deregulation brought about by the Motor Carrier Act of 1980 and a subsequent fall in profits, Roadway, which had been the largest LTL carrier in the US, fell behind Consolidated Freightways and Yellow Corporation by 1982. Roadway responded by creating a holding company for itself, Roadway Services Inc. (RSI), to support diversification. Roadway was RSI's only subsidiary initially, but in 1984 RSI acquired three carriers to complement Roadway's national LTL services: short-haul Spartan Express, specialized truckload Nationwide Carriers, and same-day critical Roberts Express. The following year, RSI founded package delivery service Roadway Package System (RPS) with the goal of competing with UPS.

Roadway Express began expanding internationally by opening a Mexican subsidiary, Roadway Bodegas y Consolidacion, in 1986 and adding services to Europe in 1991, followed by several Pacific Rim ports. Its parent RSI continued to diversify its holdings through the 1980s and the 1990s, starting with the acquisition of Viking Freight, a large western US regional carrier. In 1990, RSI reorganized some of its regional and specialized carrier operations, closing Viking's subsidiary VFS Transportation and merging Spartan into Viking as a subsidiary.

By 1991, RSI was the third largest freight carrier in the US and joined the Dow Jones Transportation Average, replacing Pan Am. The following year, Roadway began serving Canada. By the mid 1990s, RSI had organized its regional LTL holdings, which now included acquisitions Central Freight Lines and Cole's Express, into the Roadway Regional Group. It had also founded a short-lived air freight service, Roadway Global Air (RGA).

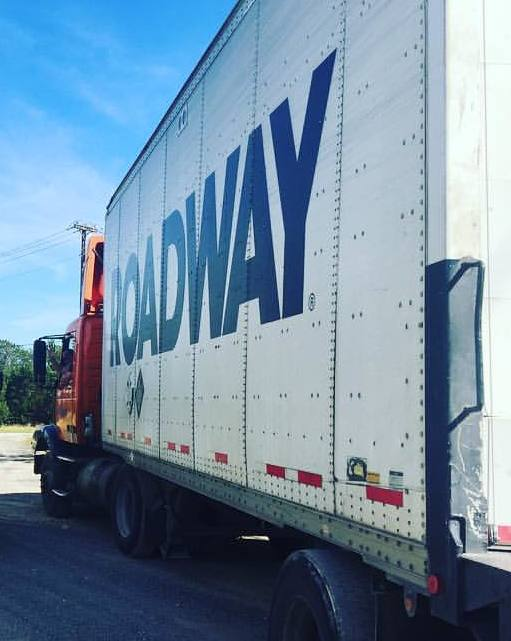

In April 1994, Roadway Express was one of 23 large trucking companies, including behemoths Consolidated Freightways and Yellow Freight, impacted by a nationwide strike of the Teamsters Union. The trucking companies had formed Trucking Management Inc. as a negotiating group to work on their behalf in negotiations with the Teamsters. However, when talks broke down the Teamsters called a strike which ended up lasting 24 days. The strike contributed to Roadway Express losing US$68 million for the quarter.

Following these losses due to the strike, the profitability balance between Roadway Express and RSI's regional carriers (all non-union) tipped heavily in favor of the smaller companies. While Roadway Express revenues represented over 40% of RSI's total US$5 billion annual revenue, it was less profitable than RSI's other lines of business. This led RSI to announce in 1994 that it would spin Roadway Express off as a separate company. After completing the spinoff in August 1995, RSI was unable to sustain its operations and in 1998 was acquired by FedEx with various divisions of RSI becoming key FedEx subsidiaries including RPS becoming FedEx Ground and Viking Freight becoming FedEx Freight.

=== Independence ===
Roadway Express grew quickly after it had been spun off and reported profits of US$21.8 million on US$2.2 billion revenue in its first year of independence. It became a publicly traded company on the NASDAQ in 1996 and acquired Reimer Express, a Canadian LTL carrier, in 1997 for an initial payment of US$15 million. Roadway Canada was shut down at the same time.

In 2001, Roadway Express again established a holding company for itself, this time called Roadway Corporation. The same year, Roadway Corp. acquired Lebanon, Pennsylvania-based Arnold Industries and its subsidiaries regional LTL carrier New Penn Motor Express, truckload carrier Arnold Transportation Services, and logistics services provider Arnold Logistics. New Penn, also headquartered in Lebanon, and Arnold Transportation, based in Jacksonville, Florida, continued operations as independent subsidiaries of Roadway Corp. As part of the acquisition deal, valued at US$475 million, Arnold Logistics was sold back to its management and the chairman of Arnold Industries for US$105 million following the deal's close. In 2003, Roadway sold Arnold Transportation to a management group for about US$55 million.

=== Yellow Roadway ===
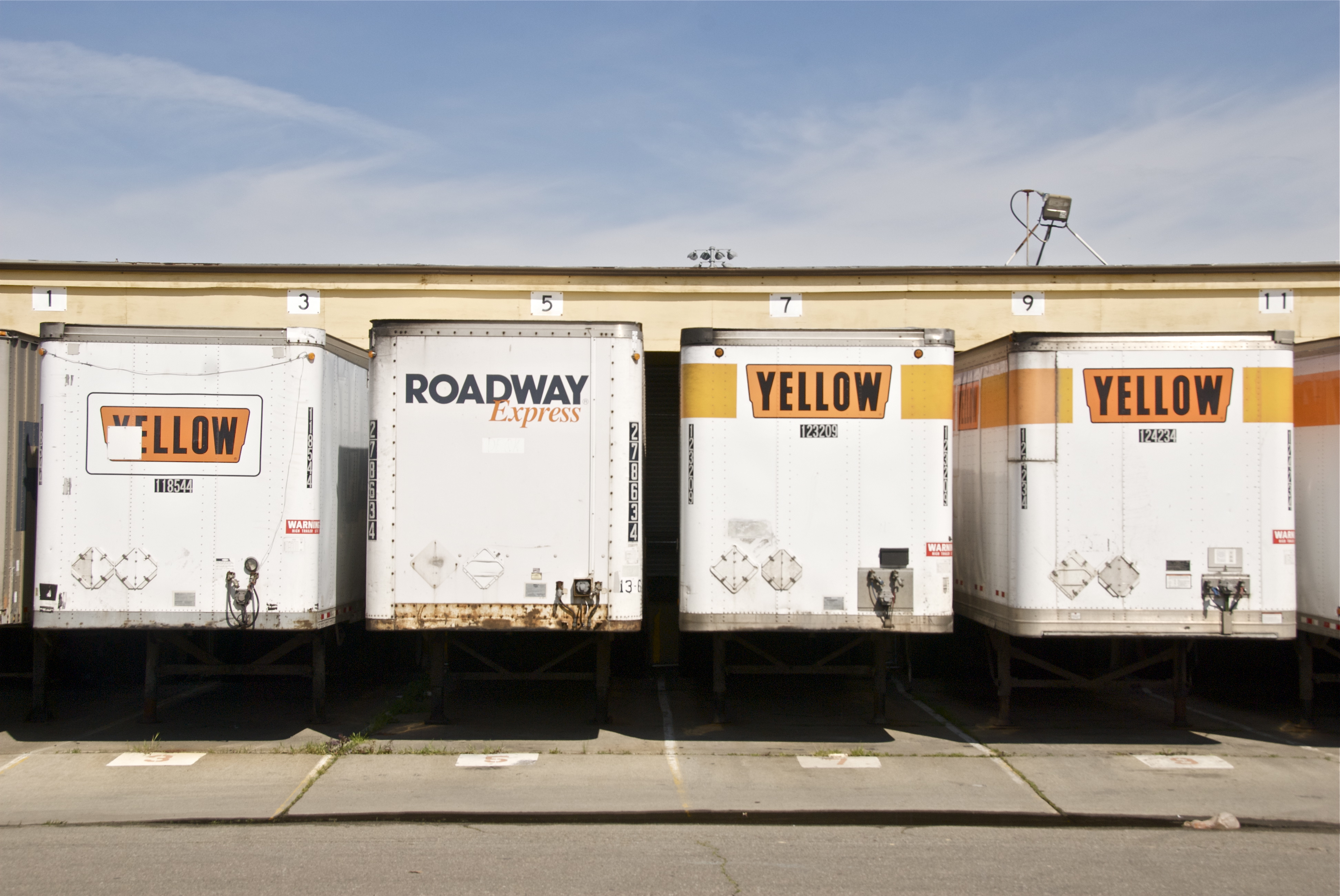
Yellow and Roadway Semi-trailers following the merger

By 2003, Roadway Express was the largest LTL carrier in the US when its and its parent company, Roadway Corp., was acquired by the second largest, Yellow Corp. for US$1.05 billion. A new holding company was formed, Yellow Roadway Corporation, as the parent of Roadway Corp. and its subsidiaries Roadway Express, regional LTL carrier New Penn, and Canadian carrier Reimer as well as Yellow Corp and its national LTL carrier Yellow Freight.

Two years later, Yellow Roadway bought major but financially troubled US freight carrier, USF Corp., and its subsidiaries for US$1.5 billion. Following this acquisition, Yellow Roadway made some changes to its corporate structure by creating a new subsidiary, YRC Regional Transportation, to replace Roadway Group, the successor of Roadway Corp. and parent of Roadway Express and New Penn. With the move, Roadway Express became a direct subsidiary of the parent company. New Penn and the former USF regional subsidiaries became part of the new regional subsidiary. Yellow Roadway renamed itself YRC Worldwide in 2006.

Roadway Express ceased independent operations in March 2009 when it was merged with Yellow Transportation to create YRC Inc., a single national LTL carrier. Former Roadway Corp. Canadian subsidiary Reimer absorbed Yellow Canada's operations and became YRC Reimer. YRC Inc. changed its name to YRC Freight in 2012. In 2023, Yellow filed for Chapter 11 bankruptcy and shut down all operations. Despite Roadway ceasing operations back in 2009, 14 years prior to the bankruptcy filing, Roadway Express was still listed as one of the affiliates in the filing.

== Operations ==
Roadway's SCAC was RDWY.
