= Roy Romanow Provincial Laboratory =

- Established: January 1, 1905
- Research type: Public Health
- Location: Regina, Saskatchewan
- Operating agency: Ministry of Health
- Website: Roy Romanow Provincial Laboratory

The Roy Romanow Provincial Laboratory (formerly the Saskatchewan Disease Control Laboratory) is a laboratory operated by the Ministry of Health in Regina, Saskatchewan, Canada. Prior to October 19, 2006, the laboratory was called the Provincial Laboratory. The laboratory provides a variety of services to the public health institutions in the province; including testing for and monitoring of environmental specimens, food-borne illnesses, communicable diseases, influenza and neonatal screening program. The laboratory also supports the biosafety and biohazard spill response programs for the province.

On May 18, 2010, the laboratory moved into a new purpose built building located on the Innovation Place Research Park – Regina Campus, including a biosafety level 3 laboratory. The new building was constructed at a cost of CAN$55.5 million.

== Location ==
The laboratory has occupied several locations in Regina through its history:

- 1905–1911 – North-West Territory – Saskatchewan Legislative Building, Dewdney Avenue
- 1911–1948 – Saskatchewan Legislative Building (Top Floor), Legislative Drive
- 1948–1958 – Grey Nuns Hospital (Second Floor)
- 1958–2010 – 3211 Albert Street (scheduled to be deconstructed in 2012)
- 2010 – present – New Lab Building, Innovation Place Research Park
