= National Hydrology Research Centre =

Canadian research institute

Coordinates: 52°8′27″N 106°37′28″W

The National Hydrology Research Centre is located in a dedicated building on the Innovation Place Research Park campus in Saskatoon, Saskatchewan, Canada. The centre is operated by Environment Canada. The centre includes staff from the Water Science and Technology Directorate of Environment Canada and the Climate Research Division of the Atmospheric Science and Technology Directorate. The centre works closely with the University of Saskatchewan Centre for Hydrology. The University of Saskatchewan Global Institute for Water Security, is also collocated with the Centre.

The centre, established in 1986 is a subsidiary laboratory to the National Water Research Institute (NWRI) that was established in 1978 in Burlington, Ontario., The Centre provides accredited conventional and nutrients analysis in support of EC research and monitoring studies. Other facilities include Geometrics/Geographic Information Systems laboratory, Computer modelling facilities, and the NHRC Stable Isotope Laboratory for stable isotope research and analyses in support of ECCC programs.
