= Applied Industrial Technologies =

American industrial supply company

Applied Industrial Technologies, Inc.

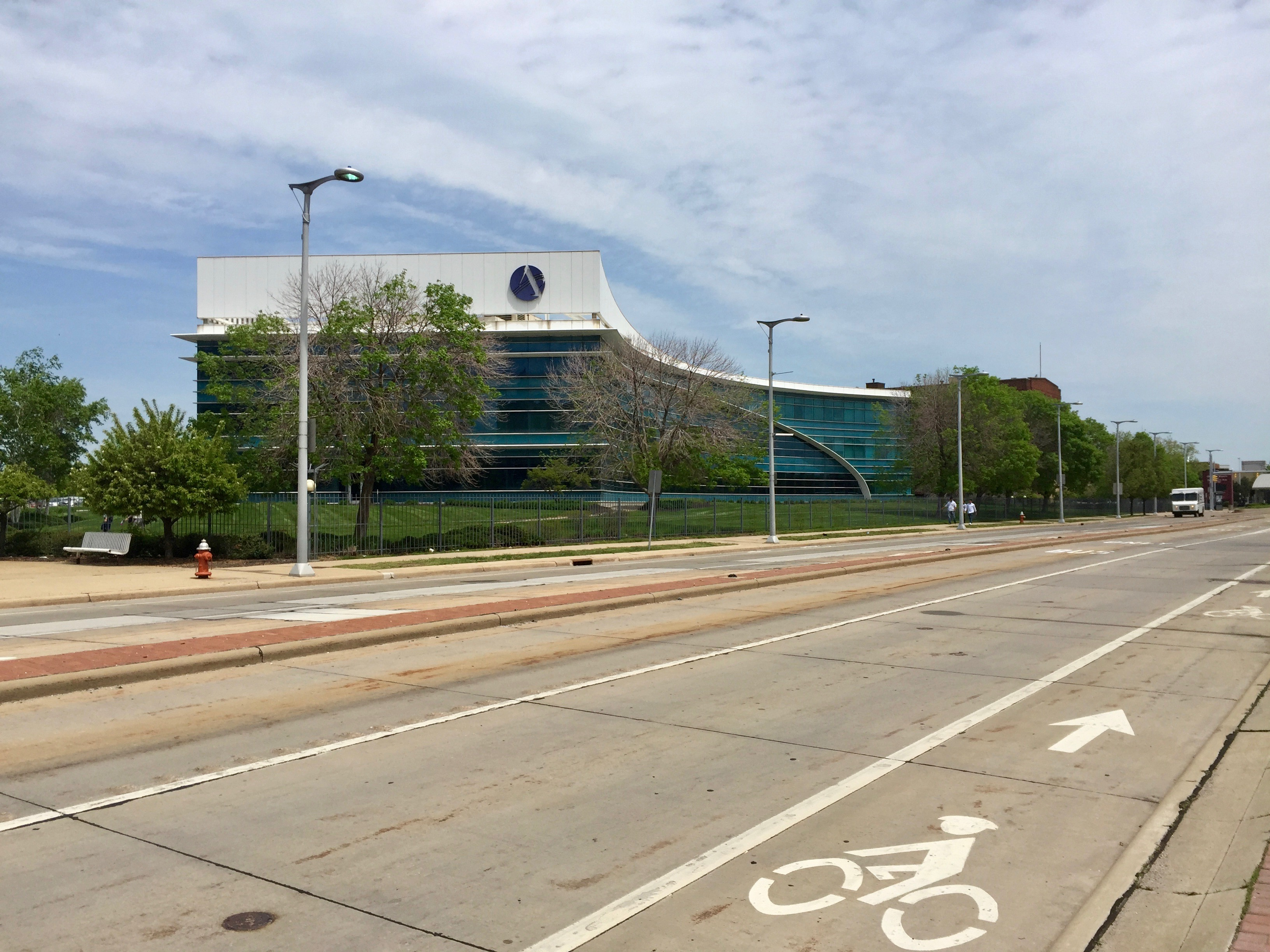
- Headquarters in Cleveland, Ohio
- Type: Public company
- Traded as: NYSE: AIT; S&P 400 component
- Founded: 1923; 103 years ago
- Founder: Joseph M. Bruening
- Headquarters: Cleveland, Ohio, U.S.
- Number of locations: More than 570 facilities
- Area served: United States, Puerto Rico, Canada, Mexico, Australia and New Zealand
- Key people: Neil A. Schrimsher (President & CEO)
- Products: Bearings; Power Transmission; Fluid Power; Flow Control; Industrial Rubber; General Maintenance
- Revenue: ▲US$4.97 billion (2026)
- Net income: ▲US$415 million (2026)
- Number of employees: ≈ 6,200 (June 2023)
- Website: applied.com
- Footnotes: Founded, Number of Locations; Headquarters, Number of Employees

Applied Industrial Technologies, Inc. (AIT) is a public, global company based in the U.S. and focused on the distribution of bearings, power transmission products, engineered fluid power components and systems, specialty flow control products, and other industrial supplies. AIT provides engineering, design and system integration for industrial and fluid power applications, as well as customized mechanical, fabricated rubber, fluid power, and flow control shop services.

== Company history ==
Joseph M. Bruening founded Applied Industrial Technologies, then called The Ohio Ball Bearing Company, in 1923. Over the next few decades, new branches opened and sales rose steadily.

The company's name was changed from The Ohio Ball Bearing Company to Bearings, Inc. in 1953 and was first publicly traded on the American Stock Exchange that same year. In 1997, the Company changed its name to Applied Industrial Technologies to more accurately reflect its diversified product lines, and is currently traded on the New York Stock Exchange with the symbol AIT.

From the 1950s through the early 1990s, the Company targeted U.S. expansion with small and mid-size acquisitions. In the mid-1990s, the Company increased the overall pace of acquisitions, expanding its fluid power operations in particular. Since 2000, Applied has also grown internationally with locations in Canada, Mexico, Australia, New Zealand and Singapore.

== See also ==
- List of S&P 400 companies
