= Siemens Transportation Group =

Canadian transportation company

- Type: Private
- Industry: Trucking
- Founded: 1962
- Headquarters: 2411 Wentz Avenue; Saskatoon, Saskatchewan; S7K 3V6
- Key people: Doug Siemens (CEO); Jovil Paez (CFO, Greatway Financial)
- Number of employees: 1,600

The Siemens Transportation Group is a Canadian transportation company headquartered in Saskatoon, Saskatchewan. In 2011, the group operated a total of 43 trucks and 753 tractor trailer trucks, with 1,893 trailers. The first company in the group was Kindersley Transport Ltd. founded in 1962, by Erwen Siemens, the organization has grown into a group of over 15 companies providing transportation services.

In 2023, Siemens Transportation Group was acquired by TFI International.

== KTL Express ==
KTL Express is part of the Siemens Transportation Group that provides local courier services in Western Canada with terminals in Toronto, Winnipeg, Regina, Saskatoon, Edmonton, Kelowna, Calgary and Vancouver.
