= 7shifts =

Cloud-based restaurant management software company

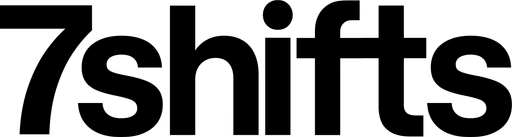
- Type: Private
- Industry: software industry
- Founded: 2014
- Founder: Jordan Boesch (CEO)
- Headquarters: Saskatoon, Saskatchewan, Canada
- Key people: Jordan Boesch (CEO)
- Products: Restaurant management software
- Number of employees: 425
- Website: www.7shifts.com

7shifts is a restaurant team management platform founded in 2014 by Jordan Boesch. The company provides software that helps restaurant managers with scheduling, payroll, communication, and other workforce management tasks. 7shifts is headquartered in Saskatoon, Saskatchewan, Canada, and has an additional office in Toronto.

== History ==
Jordan Boesch created 7shifts in 2014 after witnessing the challenges his father faced while managing schedules at his Quiznos restaurants. The software was designed to simplify the complex process of staff scheduling in the restaurant industry.

Initially, the company operated out of coffee shops and small offices in Regina, Saskatchewan, with just seven employees. 7shifts was privately funded then but was able to close a $3.5 million seed round in 2017, which helped it grow even faster. Its notable partnership with Tandem Capital helped 7shifts establish itself in restaurant team management.

By 2024, 7shifts had grown significantly, with more than 425 employees. To accommodate their expanding team, they moved into a larger office space in the Nutrien Tower in Saskatoon. In the same year, the company celebrated reaching 1 million users, with more than 50,000 restaurants using the platform.

== Funding and growth ==
Since its founding, 7shifts has raised over $150 million CAD through various funding rounds. In its early stages, 7shifts raised $1.2 million in a seed funding round led by Relay Ventures, with participation from Globalive Capital, Boost VC, and Tim Draper. With the funds, the company expanded its sales teams and added new features to its platform.

In January 2019, 7shifts secured US$10 million in a Series A funding round led by Napier Park Financial Partners, with participation from Teamworthy Ventures, Relay Ventures, and former Snagajob CEO Peter Harrison.

In May 2021, 7shifts raised $21.5 million in a Series B funding round led by Danny Meyer's Enlightened Hospitality Investments, further accelerating its growth.

Notably, in February 2022, the company secured US$80 million in a Series C funding round led by SoftBank Vision Fund 2, with participation from Ten Coves Capital and Enlightened Hospitality Investments. This funding was used to double the size of its team and expand its product offerings to cover more aspects of the restaurant employee lifecycle.

7shifts has experienced significant growth, adding over 10,000 restaurant locations and 400,000 workers to its platform in 2021 alone. However, like many tech companies, 7shifts faced challenges due to the changing economic environment. In late 2023 and early 2024, the company underwent two rounds of layoffs as it sought to align its operations with market conditions.

== Reception and impact ==
7shifts is used by over 50,000 restaurants, including well-known brands like Bareburger, Smoke's Poutinerie, and Yogurtland. The platform serves small to medium-sized restaurant businesses and integrates with existing systems.

The company has also been involved in industry partnerships, such as its integration with MarginEdge, which allows restaurants to manage labor costs more effectively by connecting labor data with overall financial management tools.

== Recognition ==
In 2020, 7shifts was named among the "Best Workplaces for Mental Wellness" by Great Place to Work. The recognition was due to the company's efforts in creating a healthy work environment, including offering flexible work-from-home options and organizing annual team-building events to show appreciation for its staff.
