= IL Therapeutics =

Canadian research institute

IL Therapeutics Inc.
- Industry: Biotechnology
- Headquarters: 105E ñ 111 Research Drive, Saskatoon, SK, Canada

IL Therapeutics Inc. was previously owned by Western Life Sciences Venture Fund LP ("Western Life Sciences") and in 2006 its shares were purchased by Pacgen Biopharmaceuticals Corporation ("Pacgen").

== History ==
Saskatchewan Research Council operates a bioprocessing laboratory which facilitated biomedical research. IL Therapeutics was developed from research first begun at the Western College of Veterinary Medicine.

== Pharmaceuticals ==
Currently IL Therapeutics is working on a drug candidate, IL-8(3-73)K11R/G31P ("PAC-G31P") for relief of Acute Respiratory Distress Syndrome (ARDS). The Saskatchewan Research council, SRC also assisted with the funding of this project through the Agriculture Development Fund - SRC Industry Venture Fund. With the successful progression of G31P, the University of Saskatchewan Industry Liaison Office (ILO) decided to commercialize a commercialize this new drug treatment. This research has been sponsored by a $3 million boost from the Western Life Sciences Venture Fund (WLS)

== See also ==
- Biotechnology
- List of biotechnology companies
- Innovation Place Research Park
- University of Saskatchewan
