= Guardian Biotechnologies =

Plant biotechnology company

Guardian Biotechnologies Inc.
- Type: Private
- Industry: Plant biotechnology, Molecular farming (Plant-made pharmaceuticals)
- Founded: August 2002
- Headquarters: Saskatoon, Saskatchewan, Canada
- Key people: Sun Lee (CEO), Jim MacPherson (R&D Director)
- Products: Poultry vaccine for coccidiosis, Phase 2 trails (Canada)
- Website: www.guardianbio.com
- Footnotes; As on 27 October 2006

Guardian Biotechnologies Inc. is a privately owned plant biotechnology company, founded in August 2002, that operates from its corporate headquarters in Saskatoon, Saskatchewan, Canada.
