= Solido Design Automation =

Solido Design Automation Inc. is an electronic design automation (EDA) software company, headquartered in Saskatoon, Saskatchewan. The company develops software for analog/mixed-signal and custom integrated circuits. It was founded in 2005 by Amit Gupta and Trent McConaghy. Other prominent early managers were Jeff Dyck (VP Engineering) and Kris Breen (VP Field Application Engineering). It was funded by BDC Venture Capital, Victoria Park Capital, and Golden Opportunities Fund.

Solido Variation Designer is variation-aware custom integrated circuit design software. It uses foundry models to address variation caused by process and environmental (PVT) corners, global and local random variation, and proximity effects. Solido ML Characterization Suite is software that uses machine learning to generate library timing models.

Solido was acquired by Mentor, a Siemens business on December 1, 2017. Solido had been growing its revenue by 50 and 70 percent each year from 2009 to 2017, and was ranked in the top 500 fastest growing technology companies in North America by Deloitte in 2017.

== See also ==
- Electronic design automation
- Integrated circuit design
