= Great Western Brewing Company =

Independent brewery in Saskatoon, Saskatchewan, Canada

The Great Western Brewing Company
- Industry: Alcoholic beverage
- Founded: 1927 (as Hub City Brewing Company)
- Headquarters: Saskatoon, Saskatchewan; Canada
- Products: Beer
- Website: www.gwbc.ca

The Great Western Brewing Company is an independent brewery in Saskatoon, Saskatchewan, Canada. The company currently produces several varieties of beer and hard seltzer, some of which have received international awards for excellence. With annual production capabilities of >300,000 hectolitres annually, it is one of the larger regional brewers in Western Canada.

== History ==
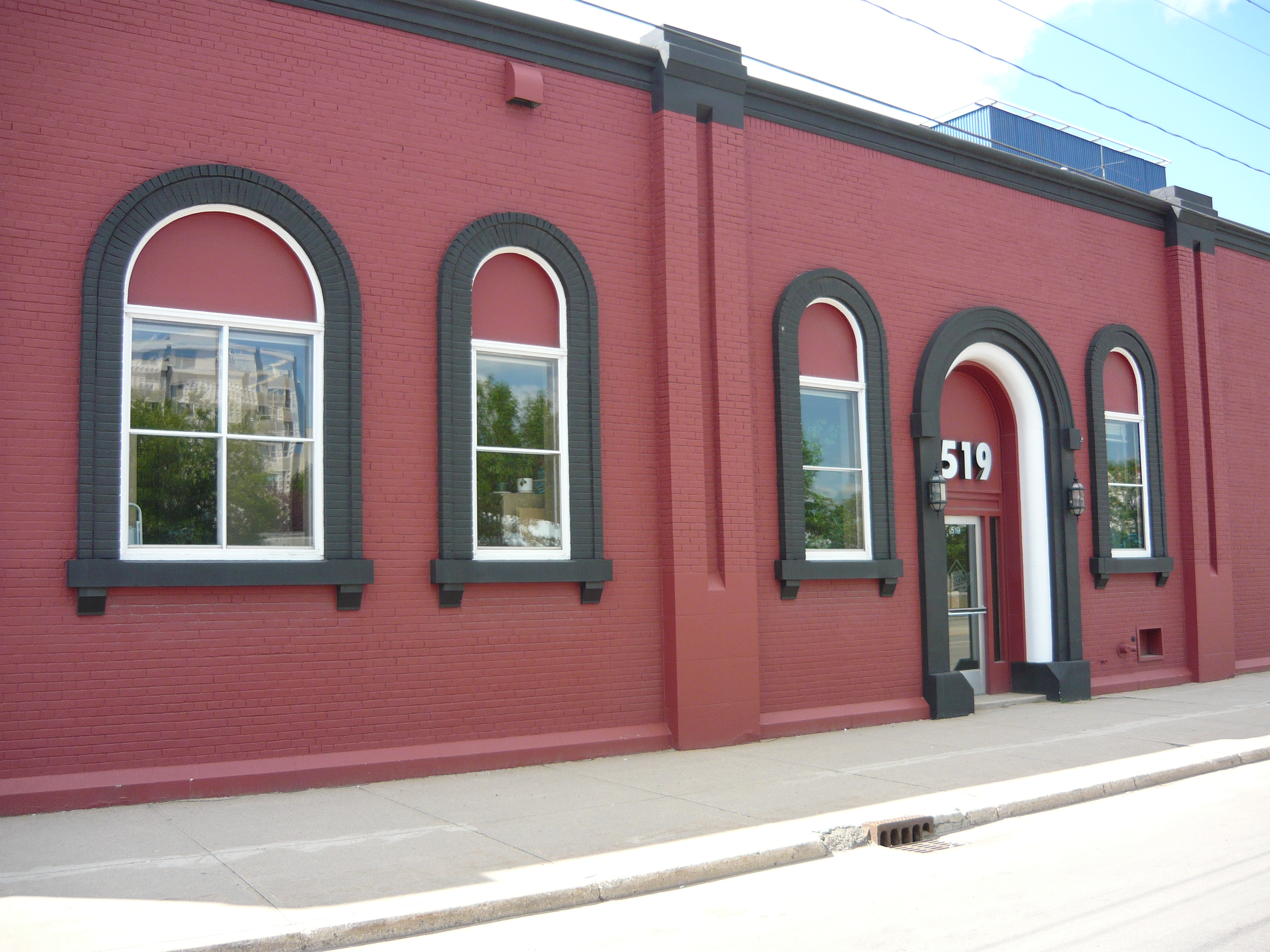
Brewery Building on 2nd Ave. in Saskatoon; designed by David Webster and built in 1927

The brewery's history extends back to 1927, when it was established as the Hub City Brewing Company. In 1930 the plant was renamed the Western Canada Brewing Company, and in 1932 it was changed again to Drewery's Limited. In 1956, the brewery was acquired by O'Keefe Brewing (which would later become Carling O'Keefe) and was operated under that name until 1989, when Carling O'Keefe agreed to a merger with Molson. Plans were initiated by the merged company (which kept the Molson name) to close the brewery and terminate over 40 employees.

However, in 1989, a group of sixteen employees and management succeeded in purchasing the brewery from Molson, at which point The Great Western Brewing Company was formed in 1990. The brewery has operated independently since that time.

== Products ==
The Great Western Brewing Company produces several styles of beer and alcoholic beverages. These include:

- Original 16 - www.original16.com
- Great Western - www.greatwesternbeer.com
- Brewhouse - www.brewhousebeer.com
- Original 16 Canadian Pale Ale (5.0% alc./vol.)
- Original 16 Canadian Copper Ale (5.2% alc./vol.)
- Original 16 Prairie White Belgian-style Wheat (4.8% alc./vol.)
- Original 16 Canadian Ultra Lager (2.5% alc./vol.)
- Original 16 Hard Seltzer - Lemon Saskatoon Berry (4.8% alc./vol.)
- Original 16 Hard Seltzer - Peach (4.8% alc./vol.)
- Original 16 Hard Seltzer - Cranberry (4.8% alc./vol.)
- Original 16 Hard Seltzer - Mixed Berry (4.8% alc./vol.)
- Great Western Pilsner (5.0% alc./vol.)
- Great Western Lager (5.0% alc./vol.)
- Great Western Light (4.0% alc./vol.)
- Great Western Classic 5.0% alc./vol.)
- Great Western Radler (2.8% alc./vol.)
- 'Bertan (5.0% alc./vol.)
- Brewhouse Pilsner (5.0% alc./vol.)
- Brewhouse Light (4.0% alc./vol.)
- Brewhouse Ultra (4.0% alc./vol.)
- Brewhouse Ice (6.0% alc./vol.)
- Brewhouse Radler (2.8% alc./vol.)
- Gold (6.3% alc./vol.)
- Olympia (5.0% alc./vol.)

In addition to its original products, the Great Western Brewing Company is the authorized brewer and distributor of Olympia Beer for the provinces of British Columbia, Alberta, Saskatchewan, and Manitoba.

The Great Western Brewery Company has entered several international beer competitions. Many of the company's products (Original 16 Canadian Pale Ale, Original 16 Canadian Copper Ale, Original 16 Prairie White Belgian-style wheat, Great Western Light, Great Western Pilsner, Brewhouse Pilsner and Brewhouse Light) have been recognized internationally with awards at the World Beer Awards, Canadian Brewing Awards and the Monde Selection’s World Quality Selections.

== See also ==
- Canadian beer
