= First Nations Bank of Canada =

Canadian Indigenous-owned bank

- Type: Private
- Industry: Financial services
- Founded: 1996
- Headquarters: Saskatoon, Saskatchewan, Canada
- Total assets: CAD
- Website: www.firstnationsbank.com

First Nations Bank of Canada (FNBC) (French: La Banque des Premières Nations du Canada) is the first Canadian chartered bank to be independently controlled by Indigenous shareholders. FNBC is a Schedule 1 Federally Regulated Bank in accordance with the Bank Act and received its charter on 19 November 1996. The bank headquarters are located in Saskatoon, Saskatchewan, Canada.

As of 2014, Indigenous Canadian groups own 80 percent of the bank.

== History ==
It began as a venture initiated by First Nations in Saskatchewan and was established in 1996 as a strategic alliance of the Saskatchewan Indian Equity Foundation, the Federation of Saskatchewan Indian Nations, now the Federation of Sovereign Indigenous Nations (a First Nations organisation), and TD Bank. The first branch opened in Saskatoon. A ceremony was held in Toronto in 1996 to celebrate the bank's launch.

The bank focuses on commercial customers in markets dominated by Indigenous peoples, including Indigenous businesses, Indigenous governments and organizations, and non-Indigenous businesses serving Indigenous markets.

The bank also has a growing volume of personal loans and mortgages primarily focused in its growing branch network of nine full service branches and eight community banking centres in markets with significant numbers of Indigenous peoples.

At the end of 2009, the First Nations Bank had lent $160.2 million, with assets totalling $266.5 million. The profit increased from 2008 to 2009 from 8,000 to 157,000 dollars. In 2010, the bank reported an income of $10.2 million.

The bank officially de-coupled from TD Bank in 2012. The two banks had entered into a seven-year partnership starting in 2007.

The bank is majority owned by 78 Indigenous shareholders that hold, in aggregate, over 80% ownership interest in the shares of the bank.

== Services ==
FNBC offers services focused on Indigenous and non-Indigenous customers:

- Deposit accounts
- Investments
- Commercial Loans
- Mortgages
- Micro Loans
- Cash Management
- Credit Products
- ABM access

== Operations ==
Corporate Offices:

- Saskatoon, Saskatchewan - Head Office

FNBC Branches:

- Saskatoon, Saskatchewan (1997)
- Cree Nation of Chisasibi, Quebec (1998)
- Walpole Island First Nation, Ontario (1999)
- Winnipeg, Manitoba (2003)
- Whitehorse, Yukon (2007)
- Meadow Lake, Saskatchewan (2008)
- Iqaluit, Nunavut (2010)
- Yellowknife, Northwest Territories (2014)
- Enoch Cree Nation, Alberta (2019)
- Ermineskin Cree Nation, Alberta (2024)

Community Banking Centres:

- Buffalo River Dene Nation, Saskatchewan (2000)
- Cree Nation of Nemaska, Quebec (2003)
- Baker Lake, Nunavut (2014)
- Pond Inlet, Nunavut (2014)
- Kugluktuk, Nunavut (2015)
- Pangnirtung, Nunavut (2018)
- Arviat, Nunavut (2019)
- Whapmagoostui, Quebec (2019)

== Membership ==
FNBC is a member of the Canadian Bankers Association (CBA) and registered member with the Canada Deposit Insurance Corporation (CDIC), a federal agency insuring deposits at all of Canada's chartered banks. It is also a member of:

- Interac
- VISA International
- Canada Mortgage and Housing Corporation
- Canada Deposit Insurance Corporation
- Payments Canada
- THE EXCHANGE Network
