= SED Systems =

Canadian telecom company

SED Systems, a division of Calian Ltd.
- Company type: Communications satellite Telecommunications network
- Industry: Science and Technology
- Founded: 1965
- Headquarters: 18 Innovation Blvd, Saskatoon, SK, Canada, S7N 3R1
- Key people: Patrick Thera (President)
- Products: Research
- Revenue: 80 millions $ US (2025)
- Number of employees: 380 employees (2025)
- Website: www.sedsystems.ca

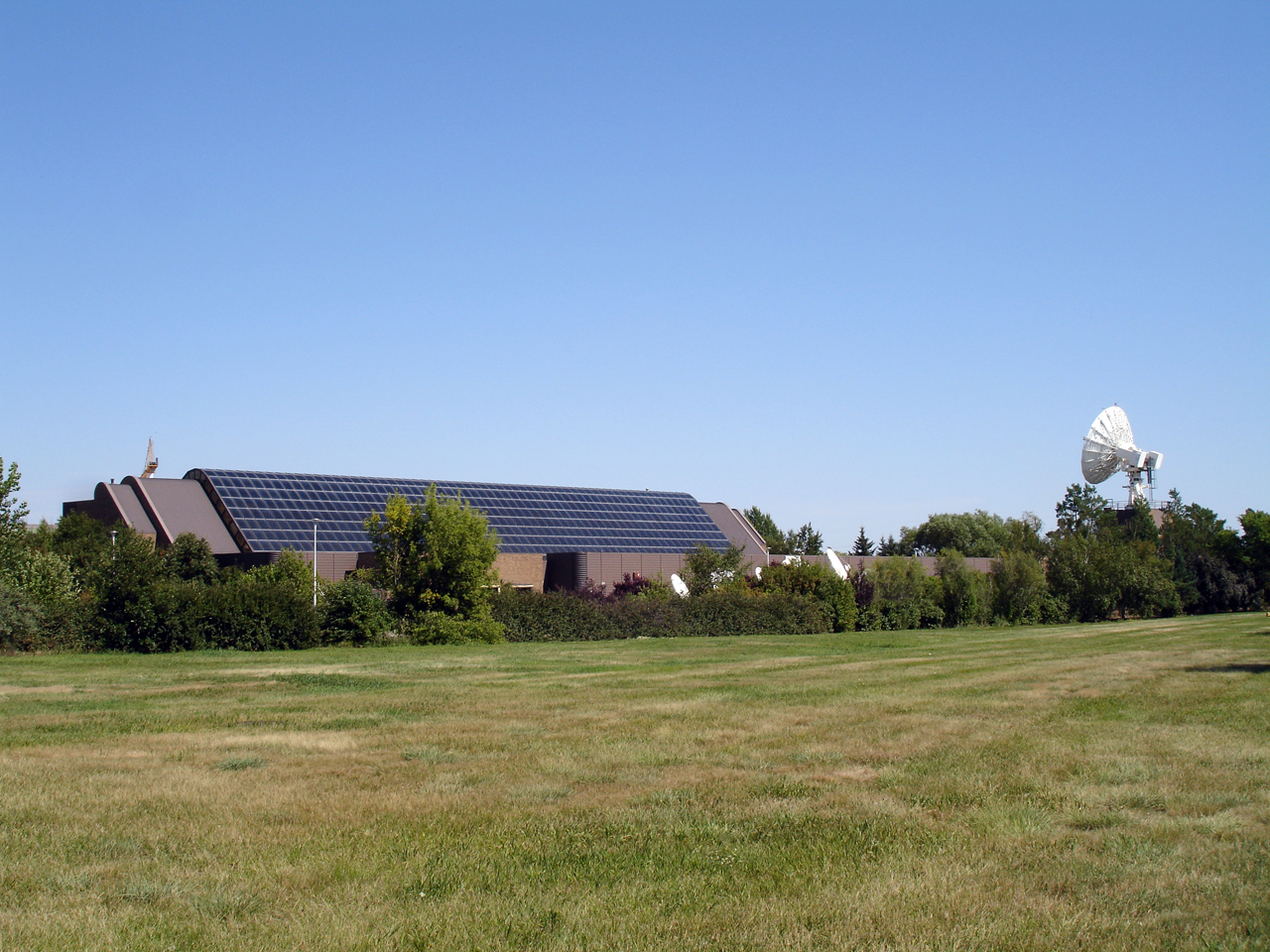
SED Systems building

SED Systems is a communications company supplying both systems and services to the satellite industry. Originating in 1965, SED is located in the Innovation Place Research Park on the University of Saskatchewan campus. As an operating division of the Calian Group Ltd., SED employs approximately 280 employees and annually achieves sales of over 80 million dollars.

SED serves an international market that includes government defense departments, space organizations as well as commercial customers such as Boeing Satellite Systems, Hughes Network Systems, Inmarsat and Sirius XM Satellite Radio.

Between 2001 and 2013, SED Systems provided the European Space Agency (ESA) with 3 deep-space antennas, the New Norcia Station, Australia (DSA 1), the Cebreros Station, Spain (DSA 2), and Malargüe Station, Argentina (DSA 3). These are some of the largest antennas in the world, spanning 35 meters, allowing the ESA to track missions such as Rosetta (spacecraft) and the Philae (spacecraft) landing on comet 67P/Churyumov–Gerasimenko in 2014.

Canada played an active role in the research and development of the International Space Station (ISS) with endeavors such as the Mobile Servicing System (MSS). SED Systems was a part of the Mobile Servicing System program developed the Shuttle Remote Manipulator System (SRMS), or Canadarm 2. The Canadarm 1 was developed by a team led by Spar Aerospace Special Products and Advance Research Division of De Havilland Canada, in which SED Systems also played a key role.

== History ==
The University of Saskatchewan's Institute of Space and Atmospheric Studies came together with university scientists and researchers such as Dr. Alex Kavadas to form the Space Engineering Division or SED Systems. The first project was Black Brant (rocket) instrumentation design and construction for studying the upper atmosphere.
