= Affinity Credit Union =

Canadian credit union

- Type: Credit Union
- Industry: Financial services
- Founded: January 1, 2005; 21 years ago in Saskatoon, Saskatchewan
- Headquarters: 902 7th Avenue North; Saskatoon, Saskatchewan; S7K 3P4
- Key people: Nilesh Kavia, CEO
- Revenue: $128 million CAD (2012)
- Net income: $37.5 million CAD (2023)
- Total assets: $9.6 billion CAD (2023)
- Number of employees: 820 (2023)
- Website: www.affinitycu.ca

Affinity Credit Union is a financial institution headquartered in Saskatoon, Saskatchewan, Canada, with headquarters in the city of Saskatoon. As of August 2023, Affinity operates 50 branches in 41 communities across Saskatchewan. It is the largest credit union in Saskatchewan and the tenth-largest in Canada, with $9.6 billion in managed assets. Affinity Credit Union employs 820 people and serves 144,046 members. Affinity is also a member of the World Council of Credit Unions, and the Global Alliance for Banking on Values.

Affinity Credit Union is also the owner of a number of independently managed Insurance Brokerages throughout Saskatchewan, operating under the name Affinity Insurance Services.
