= Innovation Place Research Park =

Coordinates: 52.1410°N 106.6281°W

Saskatchewan Opportunities Corporation (doing business as Innovation Place)
- Type: Crown corporation
- Industry: Property Management
- Headquarters: Saskatoon, Saskatchewan, Canada
- Number of locations: 3 (2011)
- Number of employees: 142
- Website: www.innovationplace.com

Innovation Place is the registered business name of the Saskatchewan Opportunities Corporation (SOCO), a crown corporation in Saskatchewan. SOCO operates two research parks: one located near the University of Saskatchewan in Saskatoon, Saskatchewan, and the second near the University of Regina in Regina, Saskatchewan. In 2018, approximately 140 companies were based at Innovation Place. Research parks such as Innovation Place are sometimes referred to as science parks or technology parks.

== Saskatoon ==
The Saskatoon park was established in 1980.

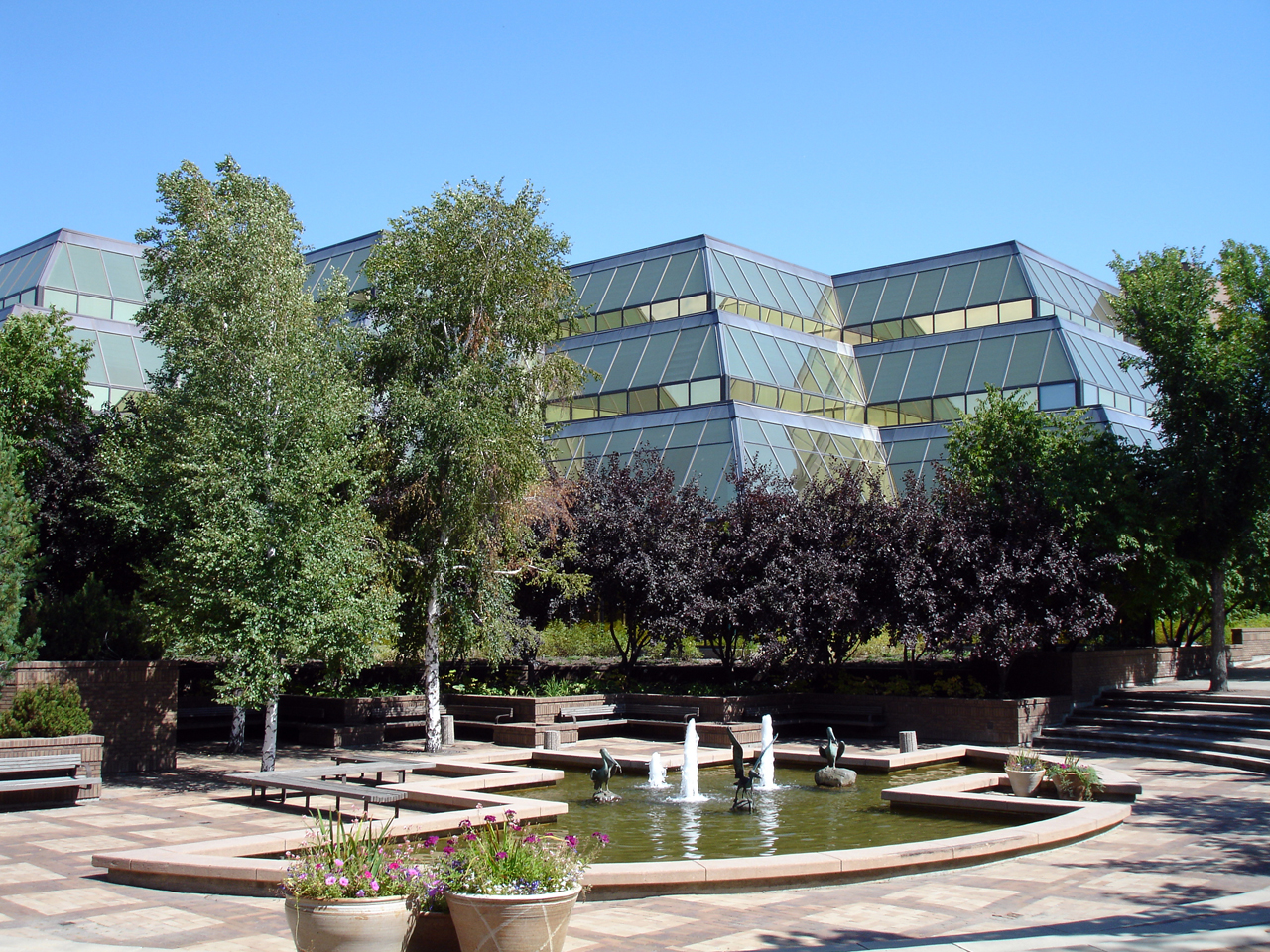
Galleria Building

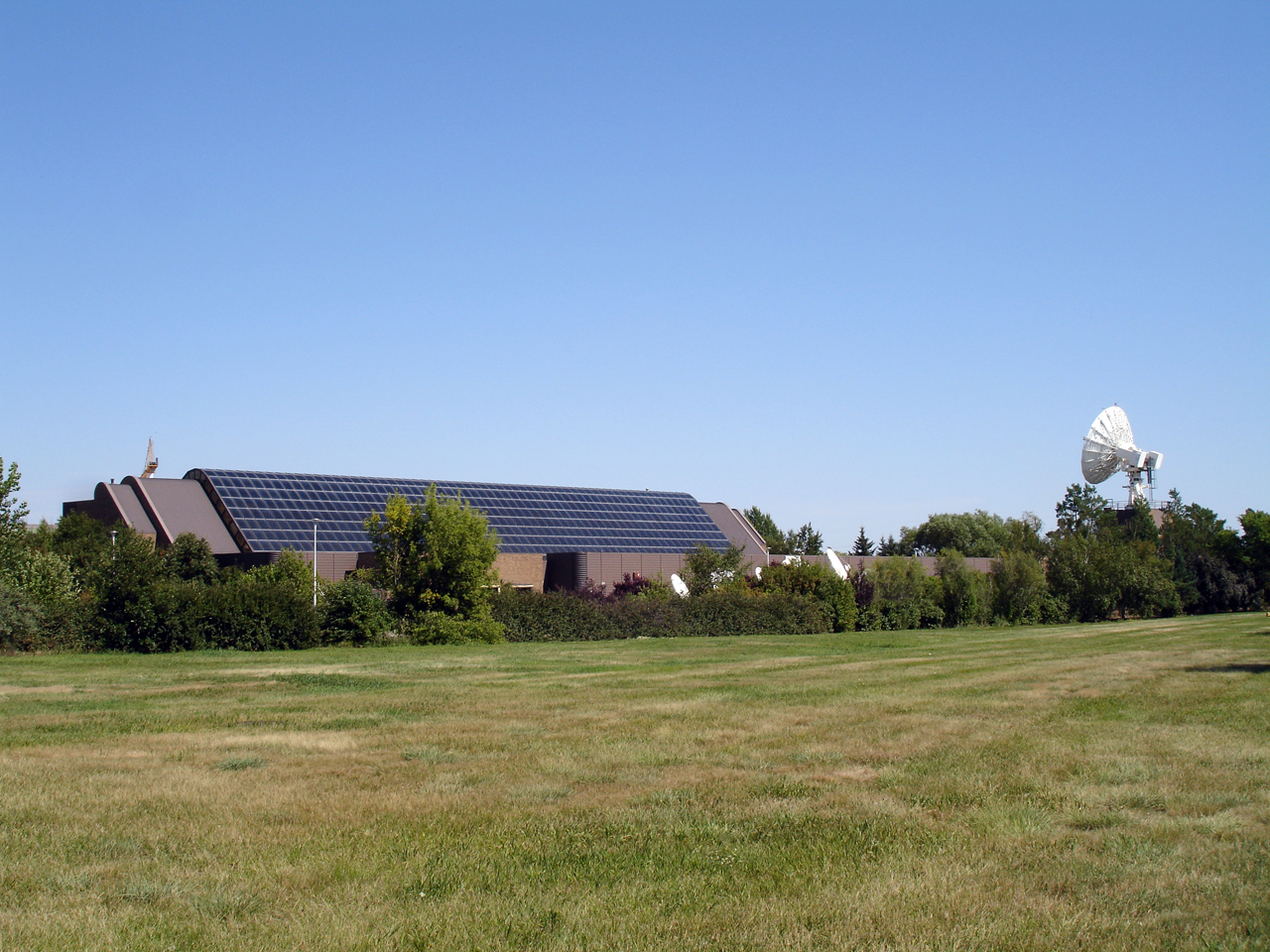
SED Systems building

Innovation Place in Saskatoon consists of the following buildings:

- The Atrium
- Bio Processing Centre
- Canadian Space Agency building's large ground station
- The Concourse
- Dr. Burton Craig Building
- 411 Downey Road
- Galleria Building
- L.F. Kristjanson Biotechnology Complex (410 Downey Road)
- Maintenance/Energy Centre
- National Hydrology Research Centre - Hydrology research and environmental monitoring facility run by Environment Canada
- 108 Research Drive
- 110 Research Drive
- 112 Research Drive
- 121 Research Drive
- SaskTel Remote Switching Station
- SED Systems

== Regina ==
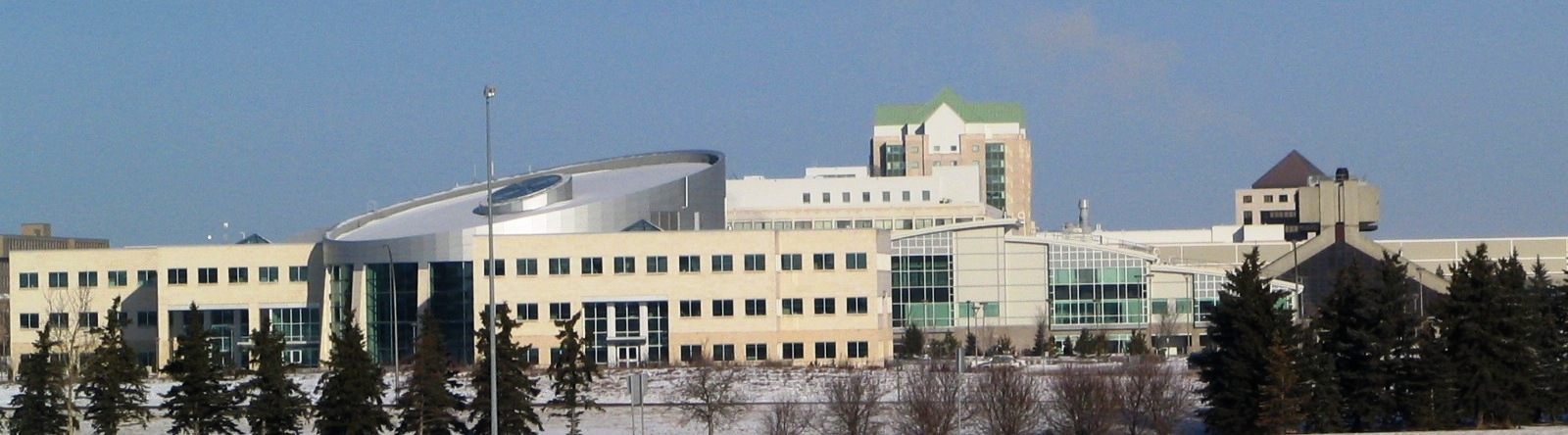
The Terrace building

The 78-acre (320,000 m^{2}) site is located near the University of Regina and was established in 2000. This research park emphasizes collaborative university and industry research in the areas of information technology, petroleum, and environmental science. Currently, over 850 people work for the various tenants of the research park.

- ISM Building (1 Research Drive) is a two-storey building built in 1990 with 80,000 sq ft (7,400 m^{2}). The building houses ISM Information Systems Management Canada Corporation (subsidiary of IBM Canada).
- IT Building (2 Research Drive) was built in 1995 with 11,000 sq ft (1,000 m^{2}). The building houses McNair Business Development Inc, TRLabs, SpringBoard West Innovations Inc., GB Internet Solutions, SRnet and the University of Regina.
- Petroleum Technology Research Centre (PTRC) (6 Research Drive) is a three-storey building built in 2000 with 70,000 sq ft (6,500 m^{2}). This houses the Saskatchewan Research Council, University of Regina. PTRC offices.
- Titanium Pilot Plant houses a pilot plant of Titanium Corporation Inc.
- The Terrace (10 Research Drive) opened in 2001 with 120,000 sq ft (11,000 m^{2}) and houses various tenants.
- Greenhouse Gas Technology Centre is near Innovation Place and operated by the University of Regina. This 25,000 sq ft (2,300 m^{2}) building houses the International Centre for CO_{2} Capture and includes a pilot plant.
- Saskatchewan Disease Control Laboratory (5 Research Drive) opened in 2010.

== Prince Albert ==
The Forest Centre in Prince Albert opened on September 27, 2005 and was originally managed by Innovation Place. On March 15, the University of Saskatchewan purchased the property to bring together the university's educational programming taking place across Prince Albert.
