= Celadon Group =

Former American truckload shipping company

Celadon Group, Inc.
- Type: Public
- Traded as: OTC Pink: CGIP
- Industry: Transport; Logistics
- Founded: May 1985; 41 years ago
- Founders: Stephen Russell; Leonard Bennett
- Defunct: December 8, 2019; 6 years ago
- Fate: Bankruptcy as a result of fraud
- Headquarters: Indianapolis, Indiana, United States
- Area served: North America
- Key people: Paul Svindland (CEO); Jon Russell (COO); Thom Albrecht (CFO)
- Revenue: ▲US$1.065 billion (2016)
- Net income: ▼US$24.844 million (2016)
- Total assets: ▼US$1.103 billion (2016)
- Total equity: ▲US$381.015 million (2016)
- Subsidiaries: Celadon Logistics (until 2019); Celadon Trucking Services (until 2019); Hyndman Transport (until 2019); Jaguar Transportation (until 2019); Taylor Express (2015–2020)
- Website: Archived official website at the Wayback Machine (archived December 8, 2019)

Celadon Group, Inc. was a truckload shipping company located in Indianapolis, Indiana. It was one of the ten largest truckload carriers in North America and at its peak operated 4,000 trucks and owned an additional 11,000 trucks through Quality Equipment, its leasing division.

On December 8, 2019, Celadon Group, Inc. and 25 affiliates filed for bankruptcy protection with the intent to fully dissolve the business. Primary business unit Celadon Trucking as well as two subsidiaries, Jaguar Transportation and Hyndman Transport, were shut down in December 2019 while the final subsidiary, Taylor Express, continued operating and was sold in January 2020 to White Willow Holdings.

== History ==
Celadon was founded in 1985 by Stephen Russell and Leonard Bennet. Initially, the company hauled automotive parts to a Mexican Chrysler plant using leased tractors and trailers. The company's name was chosen by Russell as a reference to the Celadon style of Chinese pottery.

The company went public via an IPO in 1994 and was listed on the New York Stock Exchange (NYSE) in 2009.

In 2013 Celadon acquired Lakeland, Florida-based dry van carrier Land Span which had been founded in 1932. Land Span was operated as a wholly owned subsidiary of Celadon. In 2015, the company acquired Taylor Express, a Hope Mills, North Carolina trucking company founded in 1987 for $43 million.

=== Fraud ===
On May 1, 2017, the company announced that COO Eric Meek had resigned after auditor BKD, LLP had determined that the financial statements for the 2016 fiscal year “should not be relied upon.” On May 8, the New York Stock Exchange informed the company that it had failed to meet the exchange's listing standard and the company's stock could be delisted in six months. The noncompliant financials put Celadon into default with its lenders. The company reached a new credit deal with Bank of America on July 3 after agreeing to a host of operating and reporting restrictions. CEO Paul Will announced his retirement on July 13.

The NYSE suspended trading of Celadon's stock in April, 2018 and moved to remove its listing following an internal investigation which would require Celadon to restate financial results back to 2014. Subsequently, it was found that the errors were the result of a series of trades of aging and unused trucks using invoices with deliberately inflated values to intentionally hide significant losses from its investors.

In April 2019, Celadon sold its logistics division, Celadon Logistics, to TA Services, a Mansfield, Texas-based division of PS Logistics. Celadon Logistics would run independently for the first 6 months then be folded into TA Logistics.

On April 25, 2019, it was announced that Celadon Group Inc. had agreed to pay total restitution of $42.2 million as a part of its deferred prosecution agreement (DPA) for filing materially false and misleading statements to investors and falsifying books, records and accounts.

On May 9, 2019, the Securities and Exchange Commission (SEC) charged Danny Williams, the former President of former Celadon subsidiary Quality Companies, with accounting fraud which had allowed Celadon to hide "substantial losses" and its true financial state.

On December 5, 2019, the SEC charged former Celadon president and COO William Eric Meek and former CFO Bobby Peavler with accounting fraud. In parallel, the U.S. Attorney's Office for the Southern District of Indiana and the U.S. Department of Justice, Fraud Section announced Williams had pled guilty to related criminal charges.

=== Bankruptcy ===
On December 8, 2019, Celadon Group, Inc. and 25 of its affiliated companies filed for bankruptcy in the United States District Court for the District of Delaware. As of October 2019, the Federal Motor Carrier Safety Administration reported that Celadon operated 2,771 trucks and employed 2,553 drivers, ranking it as the 38th largest carrier in North America. The company notified its drivers via ELD messaging that it was ceasing operations, and assured them that those who completed deliveries and followed instructions to return equipment would be compensated. Following public reports of the shutdown, numerous drivers abandoned company-owned tractors and trailers across the United States. Employees and drivers describe chaos after abrupt bankruptcy filing.

The company received $165 million from the sale of 49.9% of the company to Luminus Management four months before filing. The trucking company was delisted from the New York Stock Exchange in 2017, for failure to disclose quarterly and annual reports as required by SEC, and along with a poor trucking market as well as the legal issues, that included a $42.2 million fine by the U.S. Department of Justice, made securing more funding impossible.

The court, in a first stage bankruptcy plan, authorized the use of $5.4 million of an $8.2 million loan to pay employees. The closing also includes Hyndman Transport, that ends 82 years of operation, and Jaguar Transportation, leaving Taylor Express in Hope Mills, North Carolina as the only operating business in the group. Taylor was sold to White Willow Holdings of Newfields, New Hampshire in January 2020 for $14.5 million, a substantial discount off the $43 million Celadon paid for Taylor in 2015.

In March 2020, Celadon auctioned off assets from the company headquarters and driver dorms as part of their bankruptcy agreement.

== Subsidiaries ==
- Celadon Trucking Services
- Hyndman Transport
- Jaguar Transportation
- Taylor Express
- Quality Equipment
