= List of trucking companies in the United States =

This is a list of trucking companies in the United States. It includes active and former companies involved in truckload shipping, less-than-truckload shipping, parcel delivery, household moving, third-party logistics, freight brokerage, intermodal freight transport, and related road freight services.

== Active companies ==
=== Truckload and specialized carriers ===
- Acme Truck Line
- Amazon Freight
- Averitt Express
- C. R. England
- Carlile Transportation
- Contract Freighters, Inc.
- Covenant Logistics
- Crete Carrier Corporation
- CRST
- FFE Transportation
- Groendyke Transport
- Heartland Express
- J. B. Hunt
- Knight-Swift
- Landstar System
- Marten Transport
- Prime Inc.
- Roehl Transport
- Schneider National
- U.S. Xpress
- Werner Enterprises
- Western Express, Inc.

=== Less-than-truckload carriers ===
- AAA Cooper Transportation
- ABF Freight System
- ArcBest
- Averitt Express
- Estes Express Lines
- FedEx Freight
- Old Dominion Freight Line
- Pitt Ohio Express
- R+L Carriers
- Saia
- Southeastern Freight Lines
- TForce Freight
- XPO, Inc.

=== Third-party logistics, freight brokerage, and intermodal companies ===
- C.H. Robinson
- EMP
- FreightCenter
- Freightquote
- Hub Group
- PLS Logistics
- Ryder
- RXO
- Total Quality Logistics
- Uber Freight
- UMAX

=== Parcel and package delivery companies ===
- DHL
- FedEx
- GLS Group
- LSO (company)
- OnTrac
- United Parcel Service
- United States Postal Service

=== Moving and household goods companies ===
- Allied Van Lines
- Atlas Van Lines
- Bekins Van Lines
- Gentle Giant Moving Company
- Mayflower Transit
- National Van Lines
- North American Van Lines
- PODS (company)
- Two Men and a Truck
- United Van Lines
- Wheaton World Wide Moving

== Former, defunct, merged, and absorbed companies ==
=== Former truckload and specialized carriers ===
- Celadon Group
- Daseke
- M.S. Carriers
- Patriot Transportation
- Swift Transportation

=== Former less-than-truckload carriers ===
- A-P-A Transport Corp.
- American Freightways
- Central Freight Lines
- Con-way Freight
- Consolidated Freightways
- G.I. Trucking
- LME, Inc.
- Motor Cargo
- New England Motor Freight
- New Penn
- Reddaway (trucking company)
- Roadway Express
- UPS Freight
- USF Holland
- Viking Freight
- Yellow Corporation

=== Former logistics and freight brokerage companies ===
- Access America Transport
- Boasso Global
- Caliber System
- CaseStack
- Convoy (company)
- Con-way
- Pacer International
- USF Glen Moore

=== Former moving companies ===
- Global Van Lines
- Interstate Van Lines

=== Other former trucking companies ===
- Sinclair Trucking Company

== See also ==
- Freight company
- Freight transport
- Intermodal freight transport
- List of largest container shipping companies
- Logistics
- Owner-operator
- STAA doubles
- Truckload shipping
- Trucking industry in the United States
