= NASDAQ Transportation Index =

The NASDAQ Transportation Index (Symbol: TRAN) is a capitalization-weighted stock market index designed to measure the performance of all NASDAQ stocks in the transportation sector. The index was developed with a base value of 100 as of February 5, 1971. The parent index is NASDAQ Composite Index.

== History ==
The index closed the year 1990 at 417.07. The index closed the year 1999 at 999.11. In October 2007, it hit an all-time closing high of 3,107.87. Then in March 2009, it hit a six-year closing low of 1,242.50. In March 2014 it broke the high from 2007.

== Components ==
This list is current as of February 18, 2011. An up-to-date list is available in the external links section. This is an alphabetical list, and not a ranked list.

Name Symbol

1. Atlas Air Worldwide Holdings AAWW
2. Arkansas Best Corporation ABFS
3. Air T, Inc. AIRT
4. Allegiant Travel Company ALGT
5. Air Transport Services Group, Inc. ATSG
6. C.H. Robinson Worldwide, Inc. CHRW
7. Capital Product Partners L.P. CPLP
8. Covenant Transport CVTI
9. Diana Containerships Inc. DCIX
10. DryShips Inc. DRYS
11. Echo Global Logistics, Inc. ECHO
12. Eagle Bulk Shipping Inc. EGLE
13. Euroseas Ltd. ESEA
14. Expeditors International of Washington EXPD
15. Frozen Food Express FFEX
16. FreeSeas Inc. FREE
17. SMF Energy Corporation FUEL
18. Forward Air Corporation FWRD
19. StealthGas, Inc. GASS
20. Globus Maritime Limited GLBS
21. Hawaiian Holdings, Inc. HA
22. Heartland Express, Inc. HTLD
23. Hub Group, Inc. HUBG
24. J.B. Hunt Transport Services, Inc. JBHT
25. JetBlue Airways Corporation JBLU
26. Landstar System, Inc. LSTR
27. Marten Transport, Ltd. MRTN
28. NewLead Holdings Ltd. NEWL
29. Old Dominion Freight Line, Inc. ODFL
30. Grupo Aeroportuario del Centro OMAB
31. Pacer International, Inc. PACR
32. Patriot Transportation Holding PATR
33. Pinnacle Airlines Corp. PNCL
34. P.A.M. Transportation Services PTSI
35. Providence and Worcester Railroad PWX
36. Quality Distribution, Inc. QLTY
37. Republic Airways Holdings, Inc. RJET
38. Rand Logistics, Inc. RLOG
39. Ryanair Holdings plc RYAAY
40. Saia, Inc. SAIA
41. Spirit Airlines, Inc. SAVE
42. Star Bulk Carriers Corp. SBLK
43. Seanergy Maritime Holdings Corp SHIP
44. Sino-Global Shipping America, L SINO
45. SkyWest, Inc. SKYW
46. TBS International plc TBSI
47. TOP Ships Inc. TOPS
48. TORM A/S TRMD
49. Universal Truckload Services, Inc. UACL
50. Ultrapetrol (Bahamas) Limited ULTR

== See also ==
- Dow Jones Transportation Average
