= Seralago Hotel & Suites Main Gate East =

Family resort in Kissimmee, Florida

- Current logo

- Location within Florida

General information
- Location: 5678 W. Irlo Bronson Memorial Hwy, Kissimmee, Florida
- Coordinates: 28.331015°N 81.511302°W
- Opening: March 1973
- Closed: April 2025
- Owner: Seralago Investments LLC
- Operator: Seralago Investments LLC

Other information
- Number of rooms: 614
- Number of suites: 113
- Number of restaurants: 2

Website
- Seralago Hotel & Suites

The Seralago Hotel & Suites Main Gate East was a 3-star family resort located on Irlo Bronson Highway in Kissimmee, Florida. The property is located 3 miles or 4.8 kilometers east of the Walt Disney World Resort and is near Old Town.

== History ==
The hotel opened in March 1973 with 228 rooms in four detached buildings. In 2005, the property’s then-current owners made the decision to split off from the Holiday Inn chain and operate as an independent hotel.

One of the original owners of the hotel was Henri Landwirth, founder of the Give Kids The World Village, a nonprofit resort where terminally ill children would enjoy a week-long vacation with their families for no charge. Another owner of the hotel was the astronaut John Glenn, later a United States senator. Massive expansions of the resort took place in 1975, 1979, and 1989 with the opening of 445 additional rooms. This hotel pioneered the concept of "kids' suites;" suites with child-friendly themes where children have gaming consoles and their own private area for relaxation. Each kid suite can accommodate up to five people (two parents/adult guardians and three children).

The resort ceased operations in April 2025.

In 2026, the property will turned from the resort hotel to shopping district name MainStreet at Seralago, they going have mixed used buildings with paring garages, restaurants, shops, bars and stages with live music daily with every weekends nightlife dj's
