= UMAX =

Intermodal freight transport partnership in the United States

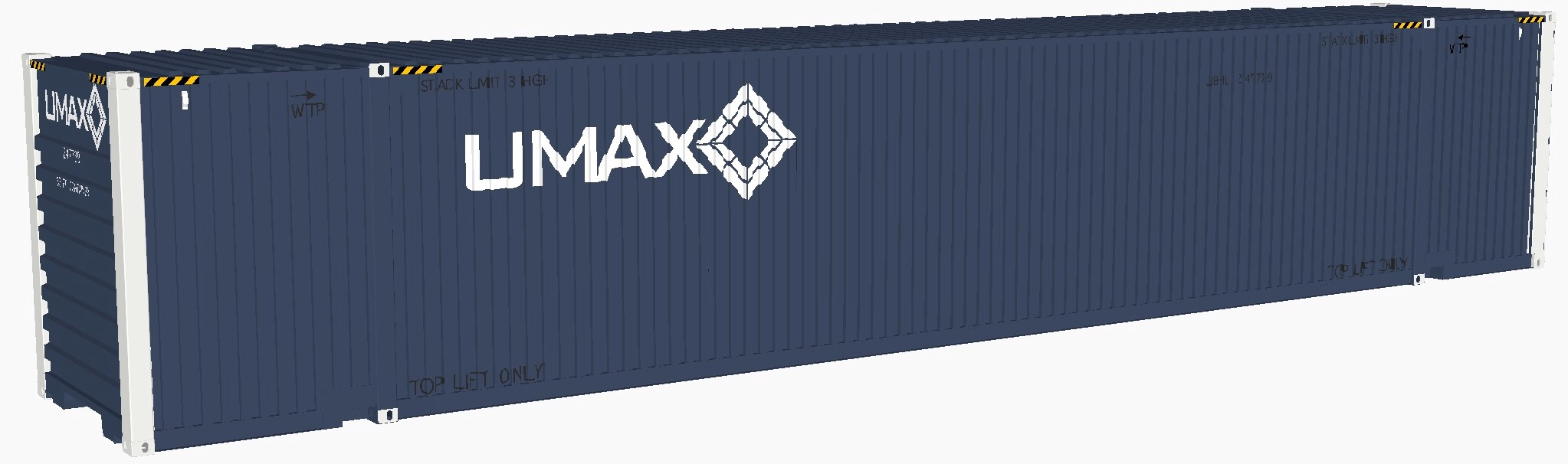
- Type: Freight interline partnership
- Industry: Transportation
- Area served: United States
- Products: 53 foot containers
- Services: Intermodal freight transportation Logistics
- Parent: Union Pacific & CSX
- Website: https://www.up.com/customers/intermodal/umax/index.htm

UMAX is a domestic interline intermodal freight transport program that provides shipping and logistics of containers. The program is a partnership; its parent companies are Union Pacific Railroad and CSX.

Launched March 29, 2010, UMAX has a fleet of over 20,000 domestic 53 ft (16 m) containers. The service traverses major cities throughout the United States.

== See also ==
- J.B. Hunt
- Schneider National
- Hub Group
- Swift
- Pacer International
- Matson Navigation
