= AMSA =

AMSA or Amsa may refer to:

- Amsa-dong, a neighbourhood in Seoul, South Korea
- Amsa station, a subway station in Seoul, South Korea
- aMSa, stage name of Super Smash Bros. player Masaya Chikamoto
- Advanced Manned Strategic Aircraft, project name for the Rockwell B-1 Lancer
- Advanced Math and Science Academy Charter School, a public charter school in Marlboro, Massachusetts
- American Medical Student Association
- American Moving & Storage Association
- Association of Marist Schools of Australia
- Australian Maritime Safety Authority
- Australian Medical Students' Association
- Aerolineas Mundo S.A.-AMSA, a defunct Dominican airline
