= Pitt Ohio =

American transportation company

Pitt Ohio Express, LLC
- Type: Private
- Industry: Transportation
- Founded: 1979; 47 years ago in Pittsburgh, Pennsylvania
- Founders: Charles L. Hammel III (president and CEO); Robert F. Hammel; Kenneth W. Hammel
- Headquarters: Pittsburgh, Pennsylvania, United States
- Area served: 13 Mid-Atlantic US states
- Revenue: US$828 million (2020)
- Owner: Hammel Companies
- Number of employees: 3,100+ (2016)
- Website: pittohio.com

Pitt Ohio Express, LLC, stylized PITT OHIO, is a privately owned transportation and supply chain management company based in Pittsburgh, Pennsylvania that serves the Mid-Atlantic and Midwestern US. Pitt Ohio ranked 48th on Transport Topics Top 100 For-Hire list and 14th on its Top Less-Than-Truckload (LTL) Carriers list of US and Canadian freight carriers by revenue for 2021.

== History ==
=== Foundation and early history ===
Pitt Ohio Express was founded in Pittsburgh in 1979 by brothers Charles L. "Chuck" Hammel III, Robert F. "Bob" Hammel, and Kenneth W. "Ken" Hammel. The brothers came from a family with a history in freight transportation. Their grandfather, Charles Hammel, Sr., had founded Hammel's Express in Pittsburgh in 1919 transporting steel for local producer J&L Steel, his only customer, with a horse and buggy. His son, Charles L. Hammel, Jr., took over leadership of Hammel's Express in 1960, incorporated it, and owned the company until his death in 2001.

When Charles Jr.'s sons founded Pitt Ohio, they had three trucks and operated out of a small Pittsburgh terminal. The new company focused on next-day interstate express LTL freight shipments between Pittsburgh and Ohio. It leased its first warehouse in East Liverpool, Ohio in 1979 and by 1983, had opened terminals in Cleveland, Baltimore, Norristown, Pennsylvania, and Charleston, West Virginia.

By 1994, the company had grown to 525 trailers, 450 tractors, and 1,000 employees in 10 terminals. As it expanded, its revenue grew from $6.9 million in 1984 to $138 million in 1997. This meant it was the 29th largest LTL carrier and 84th largest trucking company nationwide by revenue despite its regional focus. By 1998, Pitt Ohio was handling 6,500 shipments daily from 12 terminals and had 800 drivers operating 928 trailers and 742 power units, 40% straight trucks and the remainder semi tractors, serving 7 mid-Atlantic states. The company had no unionized employees.

=== Diversification and expansion ===
Ken Hammel left the company by 1998 leaving Chuck and Bob as co-owners. The company spun off its third party logistics services as Keystone Dedicated Logistics (KDL) in 1999, retaining 80% ownership of the new company with the remainder held by KDL's president and CEO, Don Varshine. That year, Pitt Ohio reported sales of $163 million and had 1,800 employees with a fleet of 900 trucks. Its purpose-built headquarters and hub terminal were located in Pittsburgh's Strip District neighborhood. That year, the company also launched its first corporate website. By August 2000, it was operating a total of 17 terminals including a second Pittsburgh-area facility and one in New Jersey.

An interline relationship with Averitt Express, a Southeastern US regional freight carrier, allowed Pitt Ohio to start serving a larger area of the US starting in 2001. This was followed within a year by an interline agreement with AAA Cooper, a Southern US regional LTL carrier as well as beginning service to Canada. Pitt Ohio also added service to Detroit, Michigan and Chicago in the early 2000s. The company added truckload brokerage, provided via KDL, and intermodal divisions in 2002. In 2003, Chuck bought out Bob's stake in the company becoming its sole owner. That same year, the company opened a terminal in Chicago.

By 2005, the company was delivering 9,000 shipments daily from 21 terminals with 2,454 employees and 1,500 trailers, 650 tractors, 350 straight trucks, and 53 smaller trucks and vans. Its 2005 purchase of a majority stake in New Kensington, Pennsylvania-based truckload carrier ECM Transport, LLC meant it could begin offering asset-based truckload services instead of only acting as a freight broker for truckload shipments. Following Pitt Ohio's purchase, ECM president Ed Meier retained the remaining 49% of the carrier.

In 2006, Pitt Ohio formed a joint venture with The CEI Group, an accident and risk-management firm called TruckGuardian Group providing risk and safety management and collision and claim management services. That year, the company expanded to North Carolina (Winston-Salem, Greensboro and High Point), Indianapolis, and Battle Creek, Michigan.

In 2007, Pitt Ohio partnered with Sunline Express and expanded its coverage to New York City and Long Island. That year, Pitt Ohio and five other regional freight carriers formed The Reliance Network (TRNET). This was an interline network with Pitt Ohio serving the Mid-Atlantic US, Averitt Express in the Southern and Southeastern US, Lakeville Motor Express in the Midwestern US, TransForce subsidiaries Canadian Freightways and Epic Express in Canada, DATS Trucking in the Western US, and Land Air Express in New England.

While the network faced initial challenges on antitrust grounds, the US Department of Justice ruled in September 2009 that it would be allowed to move forward. The network later expanded to add Kingsway, Mountain Valley Express, and Peninsula Truck Lines by 2016. In parallel with its participation in TRNET, Pitt Ohio established an interline agreement with Sunline Express, a New York City area carrier.

In 2008, the company had 300 employees. In October 2008, Pitt Ohio along with Canadian Freightways/Epic Express, developed Heat Track, a heated trailed service for shipments heading to Canada. The following year, Heat Track was offered to the rest of the company's service area.

The company began offering a ground package delivery service, Pitt Ohio Ground, in 2009 with a 14-state service area including Pitt Ohio's home territory of the Mid-Atlantic and Midwest but extending to New England. It changed its trade name to Pitt Ohio in 2011, dropping "Express" to reflect its diversification outside express LTL freight services.

The company announced in 2012 that it would be moving its trucking operations from the Strip District to a new campus it was building in nearby Harmar Township but would be keeping its headquarters in the Strip District. Its truckload subsidiary, ECM, relocated its headquarters from New Kensington to the new Harmar campus.

In 2015, Pitt Ohio delivered 12,000 shipments daily with 2,199 trailers, 813 tractors, 446 straight trucks, and 34 vans from its 21 terminals with 3,138 employees. ECM operated an additional 1,415 trailers and 309 tractors. That year, the company began servicing Louisville, Kentucky.

In 2016, Pitt Ohio's parent company, Hammel Companies, bought four significant properties in Rock Island, Illinois from Dorhn Transfer Co., including Dorhn's corporate office. Hammel Co. had an ownership stake in Dohrn. Hammel Co. also owned midwestern carrier US Special Delivery (USSD) as well as Palmetto State Transportation by 2017. TRNET was shut down in 2017 but Pitt Ohio maintained interline relationships with several of the network's former members. By 2018, truckload carrier Motor Carrier Services (MCS) and LTL carrier Ross Express were also under the same ownership as Pitt Ohio as well as technology company Logiflow.

In 2021, Pitt Ohio sold its interests in ECM, MCS, and Palmetto State Transportation.

In July 2022, Pitt Ohio acquired all assets from Teal Express.

== Operations ==
=== Service area ===
The company's direct LTL service area is the Mid-Atlantic and Midwest US. The company is under shared ownership with LTL carriers Dorhn Transfer, US Special Delivery, US Cargo, and Ross Express with which it interlines freight. Its interline agreements with other carriers in the US and Canada provide LTL services across both countries.

As of March 2023, the company had 24 terminals located in Pennsylvania, Ohio, Virginia, West Virginia, New Jersey, Maryland, Indiana, Michigan, Illinois, and New York. In January 2024, Pitt Ohio purchased the a 57-acre terminal from Yellow Corporation for $19.3 million.

=== Services ===
Pitt Ohio groups its services into four areas:

- Supply Chain: Supply chain management
- Ground: Package delivery
- LTL: Its original express LTL freight services
- TL: Truckload services sold by Pitt Ohio but provided by third-party carriers

=== Sustainability ===
The company installed a DC microgrid at its Harmar Township terminal combining a 5 kilowatt (kW) vertical-axis wind turbine, a 50 kW solar panel system, and a 70 kW hour (kWh) energy storage system. The system was supplying approximately a third of the facility's power needs by the late 2010s. It's 100-door Parma, Ohio terminal, built in the late 2010s, included eight vertical-axis wind turbines expected to produce up to 48 kW, a 495 kW solar array consisting of 700 photovoltaic panels, and a 730 kWh energy storage system. The company's goal was to generate 100% of the facility's power needs through these means. Pitt Ohio was granted a patent in 2020 for a process it developed that takes wind and solar energy into a battery system and subsequently distributes it. As of 2021, three of the company's facilities were powered by wind and solar energy.

Several of the company's buildings have been certified as meeting Leadership in Energy and Environmental Design (LEED) standards for efficient water, energy, and material usage.

In 2017, Pitt Ohio formed a partnership to deliver SalonCentric's products in reusable totes instead of corrugated boxes.

== Awards ==
The company has received multiple American Trucking Associations President's Trophy awards for safety, and a 2017 EPA SmartWay Award. It has also received a 2025 Sustainable Supply Chain Award and NAFA Green Fleet “Special Project” Award from Inbound Logistics Magazine.

== Controversies ==
=== Gender discrimination allegations ===
Pitt Ohio was sued by the US Equal Employment Opportunity Commission (EEOC) in 2006. The EEOC accused the company of having exhibited a pattern of gender discrimination since 1997 at four terminals in Ohio by refusing to hire women as drivers and dockworkers. According to the EEOC, this constituted a violation of the Civil Rights Act. The commission was representing a group of over 25 women in the suit and was seeking back pay with interest, plus damages, for the women. After the suit was filed, the company denied the accusations and said in a statement that it had been "attempting to bring this matter to a close since 2000," had been "cooperating fully with the EEOC for the past 6 years", and did not "condone or tolerate any unlawful discrimination." An EEOC spokesperson disagreed saying, "The employer was given lots of opportunities to resolve this, and this lawsuit really is a last resort." In 2009, Pitt Ohio agreed to pay $2.43 million to settle the lawsuit and provide other remedial relief including employment to the women previously denied positions, equal employment opportunity training for its supervisors and managers, and enacting reporting and monitoring processes.
