= Interstate Van Lines =

American household goods moving company

- Formerly: Ace Van & Storage (1943-1967)
- Company type: Subsidiary
- Industry: Moving company
- Founded: 1943; 83 years ago in Washington, D.C., United States
- Founder: Arthur E. Morrissette
- Headquarters: Springfield, Virginia, United States
- Parent: Interstate Group Holdings, Inc.
- Website: moveinterstate.com

Interstate Van Lines is an American moving company based in Springfield, Virginia. The company handles storage and shipping for corporate and government clients, including AOL, Hewlett-Packard and the US military. It is a subsidiary of Interstate Group Holdings, Inc. which owns a number domestic and international moving and logistics companies of which Interstate Van Lines is the largest.

== History ==
Arthur E. Morrissette started the business at a cost of US$450 when he left the Navy Department in 1943. The original name was Ace Van & Storage, based in south-east Washington, D.C.; the present name was used from 1967, when the company also introduced its "Top Hat" logo. Morrissette was the spokesperson for the company for its first 29 years in radio and television advertising and held a patent for a household goods protection system he called "UltraPak". He resigned in 1993 and died on April 24, 1996.

Subsequent members of the Morrissette family who have been involved with the company include at least two who have been its president, Arthur E. "Buddy" Morrissette Jr. and John D. "JD" Morrissette.

In the 1950s, the company began offering storage and rug cleaning services but by the 1960s had shut down the rug cleaning business. Interstate moved to its present location of Springfield, Virginia in 1971 and expanded beyond providing services only to the United States East Coast.

In 1998 the company had been awarded a US$40.7 million contract from Military Traffic Management Command for transport services.

In 1998, Interstate acquired Orange, California-based Global Van Lines to become one of the largest moving companies in the US with reported annual revenues of $120 million. Global was an agent-owned co-operative focused on the West Coast while Interstate's business was still primarily in the Eastern US. Global filed for bankruptcy protection in January 2000 and shortly after, Interstate sold Global to Naperville, Illinois-based Allied Worldwide after a bidding war between Allied and Wheaton World Wide Moving.

Between 1999 and 2011, Federal Motor Carrier Safety Administration showed a significant decline in the number of power units (trucks or semi-tractors) operated by the company. In 1999 it had 225, by 2004 the number was 126, and by 2011 it was 74.

In March 2010, a Fairfax, Virginia jury ruled against Interstate Van Lines for wrongful allegations of theft that put a former Interstate driver in jail for 34 days, awarding the ex-employee $50,000 for malicious prosecution, $200,000 for false imprisonment and $340,000 in punitive damages.

By 2015, the company had been reorganized into a holding company, Interstate Group, which contained a number of divisions including the original Interstate Van Lines. At that time, the Group reported it had been profitable for 72 years with a net profit of 5%-10% on gross revenues of $87 million to $100 million annually. According to the company, it had 250 full-time and 140 seasonal employees and 300 trucks and moved 20,000 customers annually.

== Recognition ==
Interstate was accredited by U.S. Immigration and Customs Enforcement on December 22, 2010 in a deal which involved ICE offering free training. The accreditation recognizes that the company maintains systems to deter the employment of illegal workers. As at December 2010 there were already more than 100 companies accredited under this new scheme, known as IMAGE. Interstate had introduced mandatory urine testing for drugs in 1984.

A press release issued by the company in 2009 announced that it was one of the winners of a National Defense Transportation Quality Award and that this was the eighth time it had been so recognised, The award was for implementing systems for dealing with Department of Defense commissions for the relocation of personnel based around Puget Sound, of which around 500 had been dealt with in the year 2008.

The company was also awarded the American Moving & Storage Association's first Independent Mover of the Year Award, for 2007.

Springfield has been a campaign stop for Republican election candidates. Interstate hosted a rally held by John McCain, Republican presidential nominee and his running mate, Sarah Palin in 2008. In 1996 it had hosted a similar event for GOP presidential nominee Bob Dole.
