= Amazon Freight =

Freight transportation service operated by Amazon

- Type: Freight brokerage and logistics service
- Launched: 2018
- Website: freight.amazon.com (US); freight.amazon.co.uk (UK & EU); freight.amazon.de (Germany & EU); freight.amazon.in (India)

Amazon Freight is a road freight service for businesses run by Amazon. Amazon Freight acts as a freight brokerage service, using its online platform to connect shippers with its network of haulage carriers and trailer fleet. Amazon Freight provides full truckload (FTL) and less‑than‑truckload (LTL) logistics services across various markets in the United States and Europe. Amazon Freight ships palletized goods between warehouses, fulfillment centers and other logistics sites, and on some European routes also uses intermodal services that combine road with rail or sea transport. Amazon's freight and logistics operations sit within a wider third‑party logistics offer that includes warehousing, distribution and multi‑channel fulfilment services for external businesses.

== History ==
Amazon expanded its in‑house logistics network in the 2010s to reduce reliance on external parcel carriers, to improve delivery speed, and to increase capacity. As part of this shift, Amazon developed Amazon Freight as a freight brokerage service providing shippers with instant price quotes and matching loads to an approved list of carriers.

Amazon Freight was launched as a pilot service in Connecticut, Maryland, New Jersey, New York, and Pennsylvania through the dedicated website. The pilot handled full‑truckload dry‑van moves between Amazon facilities on those lanes and was limited to carriers that had been vetted and approved to haul for Amazon. Public rate tables from the pilot showed prices on some routes that were modestly below prevailing spot market rates for comparable truckload moves.

In May 2020, the service was expanded from those eastern states to cover the lower 48 United States. The expansion meant that shippers across the contiguous US could obtain instant quotes and book loads through the Amazon Freight portal, and that more carriers could access freight posted on the system. The move was covered as a nationwide launch of Amazon's freight brokerage, placing it in more direct competition with other digital freight platforms and established brokers. Commentators linked the expansion to Amazon's efforts to secure truckload capacity and to manage shipping costs during periods of strong demand, including during the COVID-19 pandemic.

By the early 2020s, Amazon's transport network was moving freight not only for Amazon's own retail business but also for third‑party customers, using a mix of lorries, trailers and aircraft. Amazon's wider supply chain investments over this period included an expanded long‑haul truck fleet, more delivery stations and a growing air cargo fleet used to move parcels and freight between hubs.

== Operations ==
Amazon Freight is a digital freight brokerage focused on road transport. It mainly serves the middle mile, moving palletized goods between factories, ports, fulfillment centers and regional warehouses for businesses, manufacturers, and suppliers. Typical customers include manufacturers, retailers and other firms that ship regular volumes of freight.

Carriers can search for and book loads through an online portal supported by Amazon's internal transportation management systems. The system offers spot prices that vary with route, timing and market conditions, and bookings are confirmed through the same platform. Once a load is booked, shipment details and tracking are managed through Amazon Freight's transportation management tools.

Amazon Freight uses a combination of Amazon‑branded trailers and contract haulage. Over the same period that Amazon Freight has developed, Amazon has expanded its own trucking operations, including long‑haul and last‑mile fleets, and has invested in alternative‑fuel heavy trucks such as compressed natural gas vehicles as part of plans to reduce emissions from road transport. Amazon also operates a dedicated air cargo fleet and uses leased aircraft to move parcels and freight between sorting hubs and regional facilities.

Amazon Freight forms part of Amazon's wider transport and logistics network, which also includes delivery vans, semi‑trailers, cargo aircraft and warehousing and distribution services. That network is used both for Amazon's own orders and for third‑party logistics work for external sellers and brands. In a 2024 ranking of logistics providers by gross revenue, this combined logistics business was placed first among North American third‑party logistics companies.

Reporting on Amazon Freight's intermodal operations in Europe has noted that the service initially relied entirely on external carriers and equipment, but that Amazon has since taken more control over routing and asset use while increasing the share of intermodal traffic. On some lanes, moving from road‑only operations to rail‑based intermodal services has been reported to reduce logistics‑related carbon emissions by around half, while also introducing operational challenges linked to speed and equipment compatibility.

== Services ==
Amazon Freight offers road‑based shipping services for business customers, including full truckload (FTL) and less‑than‑truckload (LTL) services. These services are aimed at palletized freight and are booked and managed through its online portal.

Full truckload services are used for larger shipments that require a full trailer, while less‑than‑truckload services are used for smaller palletized loads that only require a portion of a trailer. In the United States, LTL has been offered in particular for inbound freight into Amazon fulfillment centers, allowing customers to send smaller consignments into the network without booking a full trailer. Within Amazon's wider logistics offer, inbound transport options to Amazon facilities also include parcel, LTL, truckload and intermodal services, as well as ocean freight for some international shipments.

== Market and reception ==
After moving to nationwide coverage in the United States, Amazon Freight drew attention from trade media and analysts. Coverage said the expansion gave Amazon more direct control over its middle‑mile transport network and the truckload capacity it uses. Some brokers and carriers expressed concern that Amazon's scale and pricing could affect dry‑van spot rates in the US freight market and increase competitive pressure on existing freight brokers.

Amazon's growth in freight and parcel transport has also been discussed in the context of competition with established carriers. Analysts have described Amazon as both a major customer and a growing rival for large parcel operators, and have noted that Amazon has taken a rising share of US parcel volumes in‑house using its own hubs, vehicles and aircraft. This shift has been cited as one factor influencing how investors assess the outlook for companies such as UPS and FedEx.

In 2019, reporting on Amazon's early freight brokerage activities highlighted concerns that offering rates close to, or below, spot prices on some lanes could put pressure on traditional brokers and truckload carriers, particularly if those prices were used to gain share in the brokerage market rather than simply to fill spare capacity in Amazon's own network.

Labour and workplace issues associated with Amazon's logistics operations have also attracted attention. In November 2025, a group of tractor‑trailer drivers working at Amazon's SDF9 facility in Shepherdsville, Kentucky, voted to join the International Brotherhood of Teamsters as members of Local 89. A union announcement described them as the first group of Amazon commercial driving license (CDL) drivers in the United States to unionize, and said they haul freight to and from Amazon sortation and fulfillment centers.

== See also ==
- Amazon Logistics
- Freight forwarder
- Freight transport
- Last mile (transportation)
- List of trucking companies in the United States
