= Ultrapetrol (Bahamas) Limited =

Argentinian river barges operator

Ultrapetrol is an Argentinian river barges operator. It has worked with companies such as Petrobras.

In early 2017, Ultrapetrol (Bahamas) Ltd was authored by a New York judge to begin chapter 11 bankruptcy proceedings. At the time, it was "owner of one of the largest shipping businesses in South America."

== See also ==
- NASDAQ Transportation Index
