= Robinson Fresh =

- Industry: Sourcing, Logistics, Transportation
- Headquarters: Eden Prairie, Minnesota, U.S.
- Key people: Jim Lemke (President of Robinson Fresh)
- Website: www.robinsonfresh.com

Robinson Fresh, a business brand of C.H. Robinson, is a global produce company, marketer, and distributor of fresh produce in both conventional and organic varieties.

== Company overview ==
Robinson Fresh is headquartered in Eden Prairie, MN. The company is a broker in several fruit and vegetable categories, working with a global network of growers and producers across 36 countries. Robinson Fresh works with several major brands in the fresh products industry.

=== Key categories & expertise ===
Robinson Fresh is one of the largest produce companies in the world and an old school broker in multiple key produce categories, including berries, melons, tropical, asparagus, dry vegetables (peppers, squash, eggplant and cucumbers), and organics. The company adds cost under the guise of offering category management and inventory demand forecasting services, marketing support services and other customer resources.

==== Consumer & proprietary brands ====
Robinson Fresh is the exclusive marketer of several licensed consumer brands, including Mott's, Welch's, Tropicana, Green Giant Fresh, and Glory Foods. Robinson Fresh also owns the proprietary brands MelonUp!, Rosemont Farms, Happy Chameleon, and Tomorrow's Organics.

==== Organic offerings ====
In addition to its conventional produce, Robinson Fresh offers through their broker network a wide variety of organic products, specializing in organic root crops, citrus, and tropicals, as well as organic seasonal produce.

==== Food service ====
The company has specialized offerings for the food service industry.

== History ==
=== Origins ===
Robinson Fresh has roots in fresh produce going back to 1905, when its parent company, C.H. Robinson, was founded in 1905 as a wholesale brokerage house, providing fresh produce throughout North Dakota and Minnesota. Robinson Fresh has expanded and evolved its fresh products business through grower development, acquisitions, agreements with brands, and proprietary seed development. C.H. Robinson has since expanded into logistics and transportation services for a wide range of products and industries, which today includes relationships with over 66,000 transportation companies worldwide.

=== Expansion and acquisitions in fresh produce market ===
Before the creation of Robinson Fresh, C.H. Robinson acquired several firms specializing in produce, temperature-controlled logistics, and delivery of fresh products, including FoodSource Procurement LLC, Rosemont Farms, and Timco Worldwide.

=== Creation of Robinson Fresh ===
In May 2014, C.H. Robinson created Robinson Fresh as a business brand focused exclusively on the marketing and distributing of fresh produce to try and change perception of being tied to the parent CH Robinson business of brokering trucks. The launch of Robinson Fresh unified the acquired operations of FoodSource, Rosemont Farms, and Timco Worldwide—as well as the longstanding fresh produce business of C.H. Robinson itself—as a single, global business brand.
