= Bekins Storage Co. roof sign =

Sign in Pasadena, California

- Bekins Storage Co. Roof Sign
- U.S. National Register of Historic Places
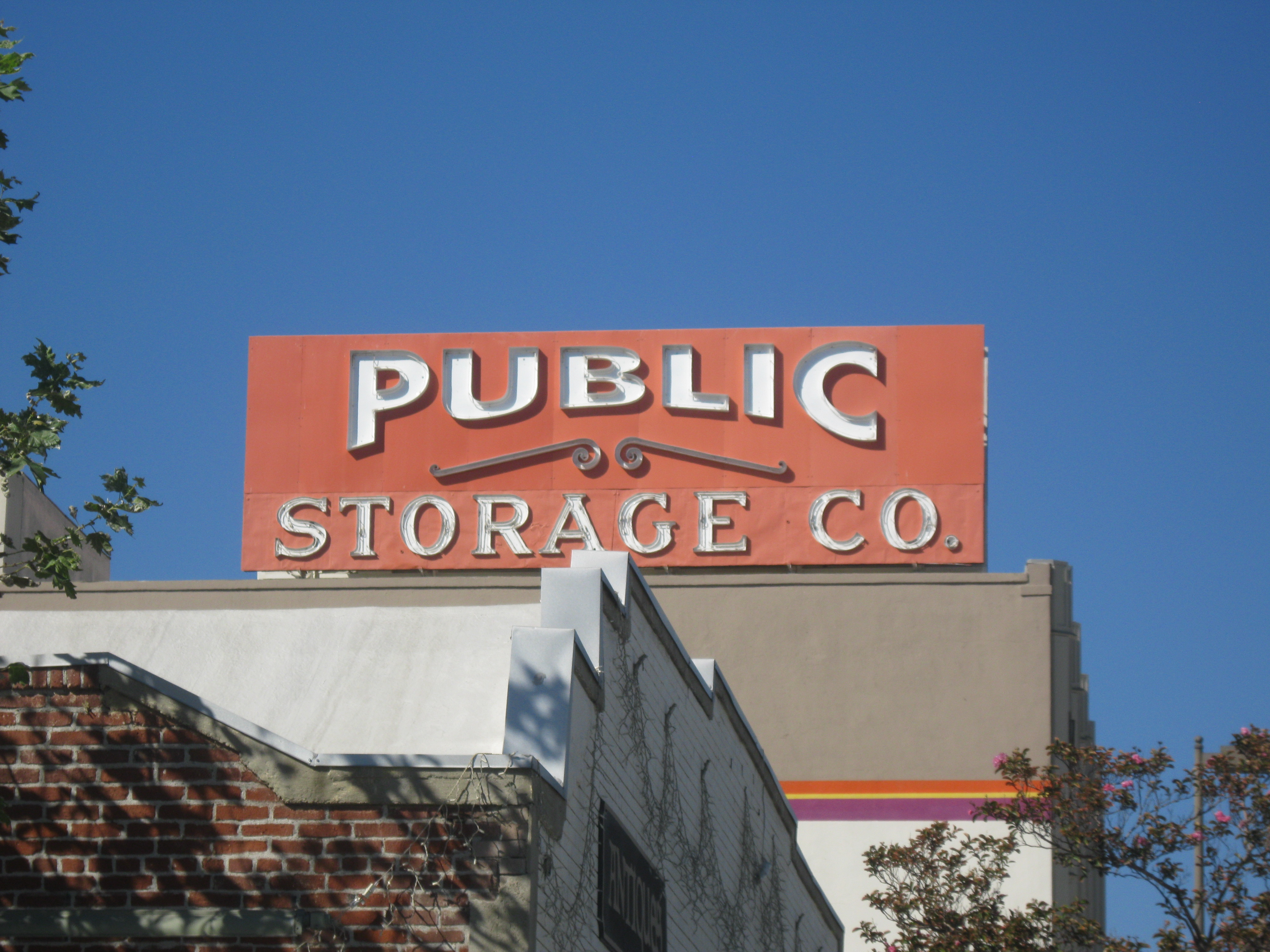
- The sign, now advertising Public Storage, in 2013

- Location within the Los Angeles metropolitan area Location within California Location within the United States
- Location: 511 S. Fair Oaks Ave., Pasadena, California
- Coordinates: 34°8′14″N 118°9′0″W
- Area: less than one acre
- Built: 1926
- Architectural style: Roof Sign
- MPS: Early Automobile-Related Properties in Pasadena MPS
- NRHP reference No.: 97001212
- Added to NRHP: October 15, 1997

The Bekins Storage Co. roof sign is a rooftop sign in Pasadena, California, which originally advertised the Bekins Storage Company. The sign was erected in 1926 and converted to a neon sign in 1929. Located 60 feet (18 m) above the ground at the top of the Bekins Storage Company building, the sign was designed to attract the attention of drivers of Fair Oaks Avenue, which was part of U.S. Route 66 from 1926 until 1940. The sign is now the only surviving large rooftop sign from before World War II in Pasadena, and one of few remaining signs of any type from the period. Similar signs are now banned by Pasadena law, though signs from before 1960 are exempted and listed on a city register. The sign was later renovated to promote the A. American Storage Co. and now advertises Public Storage.

The sign was added to the National Register of Historic Places on October 15, 1997.

== See also ==
- National Register of Historic Places listings in Pasadena, California
