= Henri Landwirth =

Belgian philanthropist (1927–2018)

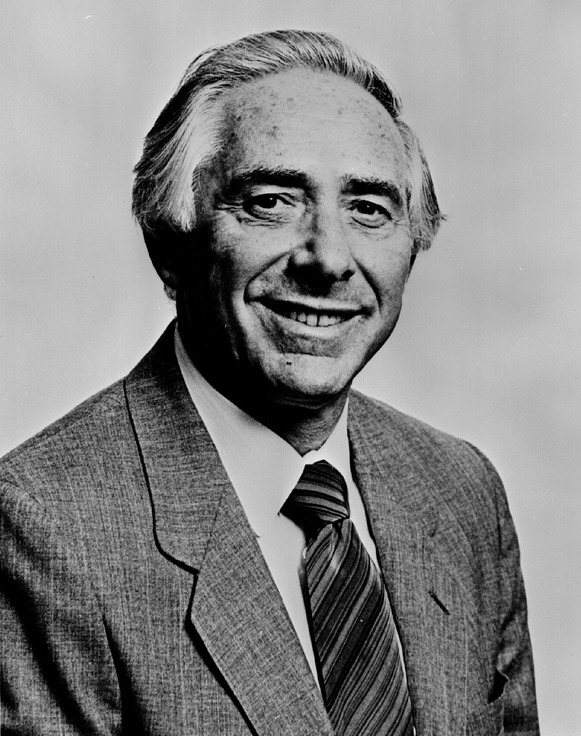
- Landwirth in 1989
- Born: March 7, 1927; Antwerp, Belgium
- Died: April 16, 2018 (aged 91); Jacksonville, Florida, U.S.
- Occupations: Hotelier; philanthropist
- Known for: Founder of Give Kids the World; Holocaust survivor
- Children: 3

Henri Landwirth (March 7, 1927 – April 16, 2018) was a hotelier, philanthropist, and a Holocaust survivor. He was the founder of Give Kids The World and Dignity U Wear.

== Early life ==
Landwirth was born into a Jewish family in Antwerp, in northern Belgium, in 1927. His father was a diamond-cutter. During World War II, Henri and his family were separated and were prisoners in the Nazi labor camps. Henri spent the years between ages 13 and 18 in Nazi camps, including Auschwitz and Mauthausen. Both of his parents, Max and Fanny, were killed in the camps, but Henri and his twin sister, Margot, survived. After the war, Landwirth made his way to the United States.

In 1950, Landwirth was drafted during the Korean War, and used the G.I. Bill to take a course in hotel management while working the night desk at Manhattan's Wellington Hotel.

== Career ==
He first worked in New York City and then in 1954 became manager of the Starlite Motel in Cocoa Beach, Florida. In 1969, he opened a Holiday Inn franchised hotel in Orlando. Subsequently, Landwirth co-owned a number of hotels in the Central Florida area, including the hotel that is now known as the Seralago Hotel & Suites Main Gate East.

In the 1980s Landwirth started offering free hotel rooms to terminally ill children for the Make-A-Wish Foundation. After a child died before travel arrangements could be made, he made a “vow that no child in need would ever be failed again,” and in 1986, Landwirth founded Give Kids The World, a nonprofit resort that provides vacations to children with critical illnesses and their families.

Landwirth wrote a memoir, Gift of Life in 1996. The movie Borrowing Time made in 2006, followed Landwirth as he sought to grapple with his past, and featured some of the people who knew him, including John Glenn.

== Death ==
Landwirth died on April 16, 2018, at the age of 91. He is survived by his three children and four grandchildren.
