= National Van Lines =

American moving company

National Van Lines, Inc.
- Industry: Moving and storage
- Founded: 1929; 97 years ago in Broadview, Illinois, United States
- Founder: F.J. McKee
- Headquarters: Broadview, Illinois
- Key people: F.L. McKee, Founder; Tim Helenthal, Chairman & CEO

National Van Lines, Inc. is a privately held American moving and relocation company based in Broadview, Illinois with agents in 48 states and service partners around the world. The company’s services include residential and commercial moving and storage domestically and internationally. National Van Lines has been designated a Pro Mover company by the American Moving & Storage Association.

== History ==
The company was begun in 1929 by F.J. McKee, who originally used a single wagon to deliver ice and coal to Chicago-area customers. He eventually branched out his business, moving vaudeville sets for acting troupes as well as individual acts, including Charlie Chaplin. McKee had a fleet of moving trucks.

McKee’s son, F.L. McKee, took over the business in 1931, and the company was incorporated in 1934. By 1945, the company was one of only five operators designated to service the entire United States. McKee’s daughter, Maureen Beal, became CEO when he died in 1993 at the age of 91. The company experienced 20% growth every year for five consecutive years when Beal took over.

== Overview ==
National Van Lines employs over 140 people in its Broadview headquarters. The company serves an average of 20,000 customers per year and its trucks log approximately 8.5 million miles a year performing residential and commercial moves.

Under CEO Maureen Beal, National Van Lines grew from $45 million in revenue when she took over in 1993 to $105 million in 2013. A breast cancer survivor, Beal is a strong advocate for women’s health issues as well as women entrepreneurs. She serves on the board of directors of the American Moving & Storage Association, is a Benedictine University trustee and is Chairman of the Board of Directors for Marianjoy Rehabilitation Hospital. Maureen Beal retired as National Van Lines Chairman & CEO December 2019.

== Executives ==
Tim Helenthal assumed the company's Chairman & CEO position January 2020, after serving seven years as the company’s President & COO. Starting with National Van Lines 26 years earlier, he was vice president of agency services for a sister company, and manager of that company’s Total Quality Assurance Program. When Helenthal started as a one-man department at National Van Lines, roughly 20 people worked in his division. During his 18 years in that sector, the division grew to nearly 70 employees.
