= LME, Inc. =

- Type: Private
- Industry: Freight transport
- Predecessor: Lakeville Motor Express
- Founded: Early 2010s in New Brighton, Minnesota, U.S.
- Defunct: July 12, 2019
- Headquarters: New Brighton, Minnesota, U.S.
- Number of locations: 30 (2019)
- Area served: Midwestern US
- Owner: Roger Wilsey
- Number of employees: 95+ (2016)
- Website: lme4me.com

LME, Inc. was a less-than-truckload (LTL) carrier located in Minnesota which served ten states in the Midwestern US. LME, Inc. was founded in the early 2010s as a successor to Lakeville Motor Express to take over Lakeville's non-union regional freight business when its owners split this segment from their unionized business The unionized business remained with Lakeville which became a cartage agent for LME.

Lakeville shut down operations in November 2016 and filed for bankruptcy protection in January 2017. LME shut down in July 2019.

== Predecessor ==
Lakeville Motor Express
- Type: Private
- Industry: Transportation
- Founded: 1921; 105 years ago in Roseville, Minnesota
- Founder: Vincent Wren
- Defunct: July 12, 2019
- Headquarters: Roseville, Minnesota, United States
- Area served: Midwestern US
- Owner: Kevin Deming (president)

=== Foundation ===
Lakeville Motor Express was founded in Roseville, Minnesota in 1921 by Vincent Wren. In 1979, Vincent handed management of the company to his oldest son, John, who later became full owner by buying out his two brothers. John continued to operate the company as a family business until the late 2000s.

=== Strategic networks ===
One key aspect of Lakeville's strategy in the late 1990s and early 2000s was a pair of interline relationships with other regional carriers.

In 1996, it formed "ExpressLink", a partnership with Estes Express Lines and TST Overland Express in which the three cooperated in transferring shipments between each of their areas of focus effectively extending each company's range. This remained in place for 12 years since for most of that time each carrier had a strong focus on specific regions: Lakeville in the Midwest US, Estes in the US South, East, and West, and TST in Canada. During this time, Lakeville's revenue grew from less than US$50 million to $115 million in 2008.

The agreement officially ended March 1, 2008, a move attributed to Estes' encroachment into Lakeville's territory. To replace ExpressLink, Lakeville worked with Averitt Express, a Southern and Southeastern US regional carrier, in 2007 to form an interline relationship which it called the "Reliance Network". When the new network began operations in 2008 it included 4 additional regional carriers, all of them non-union: Pitt Ohio Express in the Mid- and Central-Atlantic US, Canadian Freightways and Epic Express in Canada, DATS Trucking in the Western US, and Land Air Express in New England. By 2016 it included Kingsway, Mountain Valley Express, and Peninsula Truck Lines.

=== Late history ===
John Wren sold the business to Roger and Shari Wilsey in December 2009 with Roger becoming the company's CEO. Roger was a vice president at Lakeville and the Wilsey family had a 65-year history owning and operating Indianhead Truck Lines until its closure in 1997. At the time, Lakeville had approximately 500 employees, 1,000 tractors and trailers, and 34 terminals.

The Wilseys restructured Lakeville, separating the company's unionized and non-union business in the early 2010s. The non-union regional LTL business was moved to a new company, LME, Inc., which also absorbed Lakeville's truckload operations. Lakeville Motor Express continued to be based in Roseville and maintained the unionized business. It acted as a cartage agent for LME for the St. Paul area. From August 2015, Kevin Deming was president and sole owner of Lakeville Motor Express.

Lakeville shut down operations unexpectedly on November 19, 2016, and subsequently filed for bankruptcy protection on January 20, 2017. Lakeville's president, Deming, blamed the closure on "heavy financial losses" citing challenges in "handling business levels as required" and difficulties hiring drivers. In a November 19 letter to a local Teamster's Union leader, Deming said, "Lakeville is out of cash and has no reserves to pay any amounts owed to employees or vendors..."

== LME ==
=== Foundation ===
LME, Inc. was founded in the early 2010s in the Minneapolis–Saint Paul suburb of New Brighton, Minnesota and absorbed the non-union business of its predecessor, Lakeville Motor Express, based in nearby Roseville.

When Lakeville ceased operating in November 2016, LME said that Lakeville's shutdown would not impact LME's operations.

=== Closure ===
On July 12, 2019, LME shut down, closing all of its approximately 30 locations in the Midwest. The shutdown occurred with short notice to employees, though the company said that some employees would remain to help redirect freight for delivery by alternative carriers. A Minnesota Department of Labor and Industry spokesperson said it would "assess the situation" given reports in local news outlets that some employees had not been paid.

== Controversies ==
=== Lakeville Motor Express closure ===
Immediately following Lakeville's November 2016 closure, Union officials, who represented 95 Lakeville drivers and dockworkers, accused the company's ownership of redirecting freight to Finish Line Express, a carrier formed earlier in 2016 by a former Lakeville executive. Union leadership also criticized Lakeville for giving employees little to no notice of a possible shutdown especially in proximity to a holiday.

Following the shutdown, union workers who had been laid off from Lakeville filed complaints, along with the Teamsters, with the state of Minnesota and the National Labor Relations Board (NLRB) alleging unfair labor practices.

On January 26, 2017, the state of Minnesota sued Lakeville, LME, and Finish Line accusing the three companies of fraud, wage theft, and fraudulent transfer of assets from Lakeville to the other two companies. The suit claimed Lakeville's shut down had been a ruse manufactured as an excuse to lock out union workers and withhold back pay.

In March 2018, two additional suits were filed alleging violations of the company's bankruptcy and pension obligations. On March 15, a number of Teamsters pension funds sued Lakeville, LME, Finish Line, as well as Roger and Shari Wilsey. The suit alleged unpaid liabilities, which it claimed to be $90.1 million, toward a number of pension plans related through a collective bargaining agreement. On March 28, LME and Finish Line Express co-owner Roger Wilsey was sued by the trustee responsible for Lakeville's bankruptcy petition. According to the suit, Lakeville was not eligible for bankruptcy protection because of alleged "fraudulent transfer" of Lakeville assets to either LME or Wilsey. According to the trustee, the transfer had been a way to hide assets including $4.3 million in payments to LME. The suit also claimed that LME controlled or shared Lakeville's operations and many other functions through 2016.

The Minnesota Department of Labor and Industry said in April, 2018 they had reached a tentative settlement agreement with LME for the department's case. Further details were withheld for 60 days since Lakeville and LME were still in talks to settle other cases. Also in April, the NLRB informed the Teamsters it had found enough cause for concern to open an investigation into the union's assertion that Lakeville had not actually shut down but had effectively switched to cheaper, non-union labor and continued operations as LME. The NLRB said it would attempt to settle with Lakeville to avoid going to trial.

In 2018, the NLRB found that the workers had been wrongly terminated in favor of cheaper, non-union labor with LME acting as the "alter ego" for Lakeville. The ruling concluded that the workers were entitled to $1.25 million in back pay. LME officials denied the allegations but were forced to began paying back pay in June 2019.
