= Marten Transport =

American trucking company

Marten Transport, Ltd.
- Type: Public
- Traded as: Nasdaq: MRTN; S&P 600 component
- Industry: Freight transport
- Founded: 1946
- Founder: Roger Marten
- Headquarters: Mondovi, Wisconsin, U.S.
- Website: www.marten.com

Marten Transport, Ltd. is an American trucking company headquartered in Mondovi, Wisconsin. The company offers refrigerated and dry van freight transport services across the United States, Canada, and Mexico.

== History ==
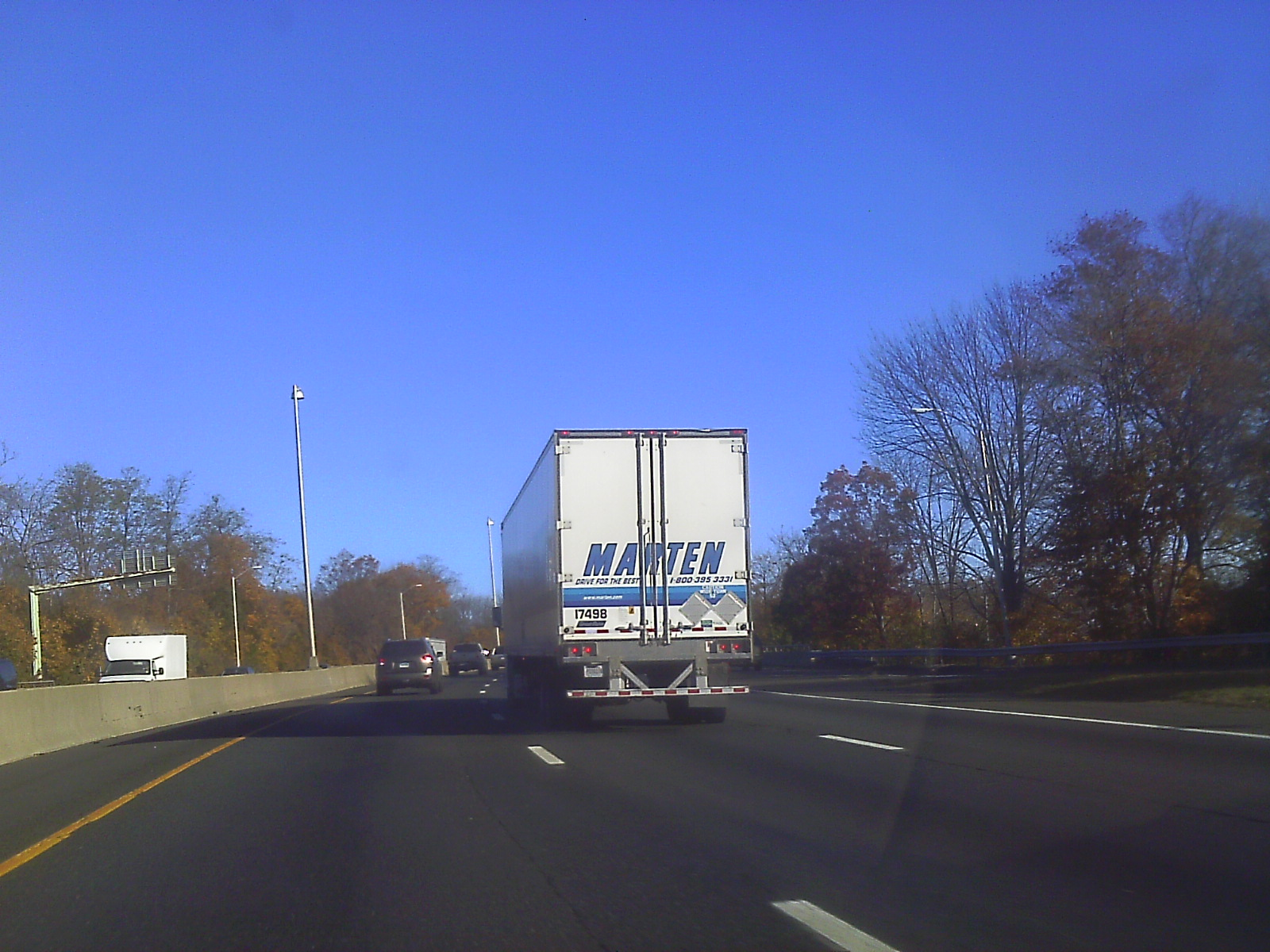
Rear view of a Marten Transport trailer in 2010

Marten Transport was established in 1946 by Roger Marten, who delivered milk and other dairy products in Wisconsin. Marten purchased his first tractor-trailer in 1956 and began hauling petroleum products. The company acquired its first dry van trailers in the 1960s and established its first terminal in 1965 in Mondovi, Wisconsin.

Marten Transport expanded in the 1980s after the deregulation of the trucking industry. The company went public in 1986, with a stock launch on the NASDAQ. In 1989, the company restructured to only focus on refrigerated transport, its most profitable sector.

Company founder Roger Marten died in 1993. His son, Randolph Marten, took over as CEO the same year. Timothy Kohl became CEO in 2021 until 2025, when he retired and Randolph Marten resumed the role.

Marten Transport added an intermodal division in 2005. By 2008, 80% of the company's revenue came from temperature-controlled shipping and 20% of its revenue came from dry goods shipping.

In 2025, Hub Group acquired Marten Transport's intermodal division for $51.8 million.

== Operations ==
Marten Transport operates across the contiguous United States, Canada, and Mexico. The company maintains a fleet of dry van and refrigerated trailers and offers truckload shipping services over dedicated, regional, and long-haul routes.
