= Wheaton World Wide Moving =

US company

- Industry: Moving & storage
- Founded: 1945; 81 years ago
- Headquarters: Indianapolis, Indiana, US
- Website: www.wheatonworldwide.com

Wheaton World Wide Moving is a moving and storage company based in Indianapolis, Indiana, with more than 250 authorized agents. It handles household moving, corporate relocation, international shipping, military and government relocation and special commodity shipments.

== History ==
- 1945: Clipper Van Lines founded by Earnest S. Wheaton
- 1951: Changed name to Wheaton Van Lines, Inc., following lawsuit with Pan Am
- Late 1950s: Expanded domestic and international services
- 1973: First carrier in the nation to hold complete 50-state authority from the Interstate Commerce Commission
- 1986: Named one of the top 101 service companies in America
- 1987: Changed name to Wheaton World Wide Moving
- 1989: Named one of the top 101 service companies in America
- 2000: Became a corporate sponsor of Give Kids the World, a non-profit for children with life-threatening diseases
- 2012: Acquired Bekins Van Lines, Inc.

== Awards and highlights ==
Wheaton Moving supports the Give Kids the World program, which helps children with life-threatening illnesses visit attractions in central Florida by providing transportation, meals and attraction tickets.

Wheaton's chairman, Stephen Burns, was named 2006 Ernst & Young Entrepreneur of the Year for the Lake Michigan Area Program. The current president & CEO of Wheaton is Jim Gaw, since 2024.
