= Bekins Van Lines, Inc. =

American company

- Type: Subsidiary
- Industry: Moving and Storage
- Founded: 1891; 135 years ago
- Headquarters: Indianapolis, Indiana, United States
- Number of locations: Over 300
- Area served: International
- Number of employees: Over 5,300 (over 5,000 drivers and 300 agents) (2009)
- Parent: Wheaton World Wide Moving
- Website: www.bekins.com

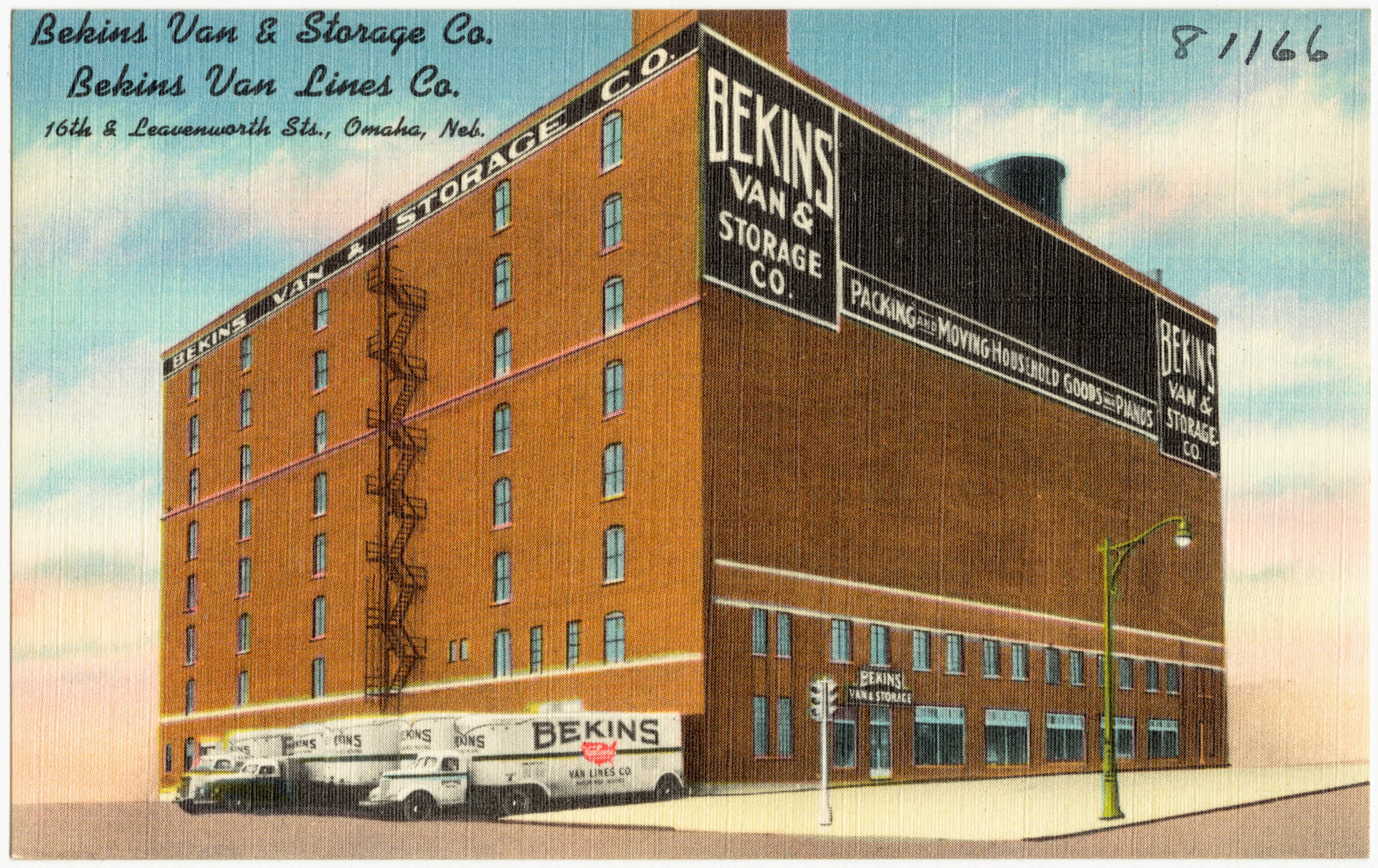
An early-20th-century postcard of a Bekins storage facility in Omaha, Nebraska

Bekins Van Lines, Inc. is an American domestic and international private and corporate household goods relocation service provider. Headquartered in Indianapolis, Indiana, Bekins also offers special commodities and logistic services. The United States Armed Forces is one of Bekins' largest customers.

== History ==
In 1891, in Sioux City, Iowa, John Bekius and Martin (né Bekius) Bekins, brothers, started a furniture moving business.

In 1894, Martin Bekins brought the Bekins business to Los Angeles. In 1927, he built his Eagle Rock, Los Angeles estate.

Bekins was purchased by Minstar Inc., controlled by Irwin L. Jacobs, for $89.2 million in 1983. In 1987, Bekins' management team, led by president Thomas E. Epley, purchased 60% of the company for $66 million. Jacobs re-acquired Bekins through IMR Fund L.P. in January 1993.

== Operation ==
In 2009, the company had over 300 locations and a fleet of over 2,100 vehicles. The company also owns warehouse space that exceeds four million square feet.

Bekins was acquired by Wheaton World Wide Moving in 2012. After the acquisition, the Bekins Van Lines brand name continued to be used as a separate brand.

It is the oldest currently operating household moving company in the United States. It is one of the largest moving companies in North America.

== In popular culture ==
A Los Angeles California Bekins moving and Storage Truck is one of the Landmarks used in the 1936 Columbia pictures Short "False Alarms" starring the Three Stooges.

== See also ==
- Bekins Storage Co. roof sign
