= Knight-Swift =

American truckload transportation company

Knight-Swift Transportation Holdings Inc.

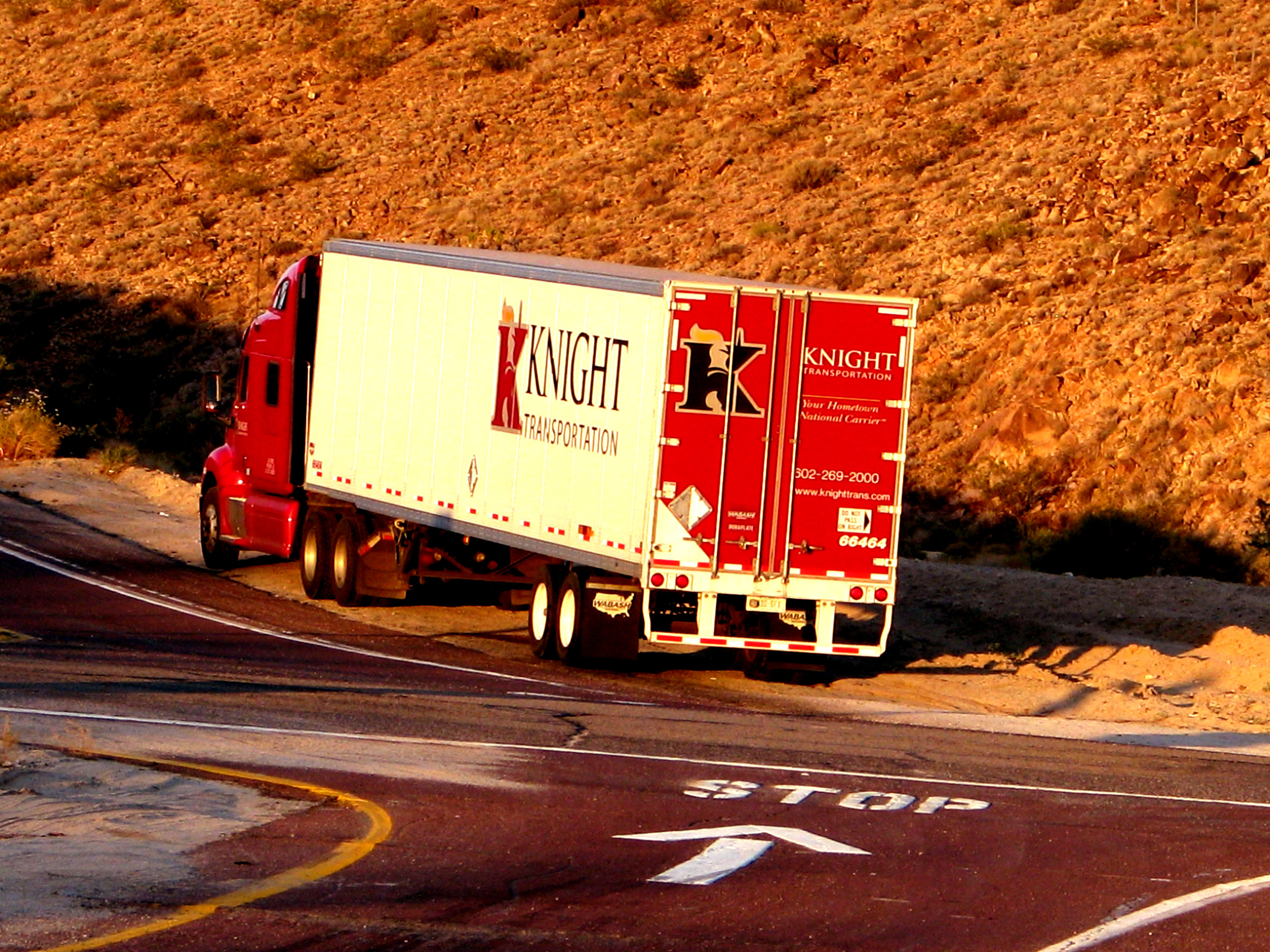
- Knight Transportation truck in 2008.
- Type: Public
- Traded as: NYSE: KNX; S&P 400 component
- Industry: Motor transportation-trucking
- Founded: Knight Transportation: 1990; 36 years ago Swift Transportation: 1966; 60 years ago Knight & Swift Merger: September 8, 2017; 9 years ago
- Headquarters: Phoenix, Arizona, U.S.
- Key people: David Vander Ploeg (executive chairman); Gary J. Knight (executive vice chairman); Adam W. Miller (CEO); Andrew Hess (CFO)
- Products: Truckload shipping
- Revenue: ▲US$5.99 billion (2021)
- Operating income: ▲US$966 million (2021)
- Net income: ▲US$744 million (2021)
- Total assets: ▲US$10.66 billion (2021)
- Total equity: ▲US$6.54 billion (2021)
- Number of employees: c. 28,000 (2023)
- Subsidiaries: Knight Transportation; Swift Transportation; AAA Cooper; Midwest Motor Express; U.S. Xpress; DHE Transportation; UTXL; Barr-Nunn; Abilene
- Website: knighttrans.com

Knight-Swift Transportation Holdings Inc. (referred to as Knight-Swift) is a publicly traded American motor carrier holding company based in Phoenix, Arizona. The company's primary subsidiaries are truckload carriers Knight Transportation, Swift Transportation, Midnite Express and, since July 2021, less than truckload (LTL) carrier AAA Cooper. Knight-Swift has continued to grow through acquisitions including its 2023 purchase of major truckload carrier U.S. Xpress.

== History ==
Knight Transportation was founded in 1990 by four cousins: brothers Randy and Gary Knight, and brothers Kevin and Keith Knight. The four cousins worked for Swift Transportation, also based in Phoenix, and Randy was even a part-owner in Swift when Jerry Moyes bought out his interest. The Moyes family and the Knight family both were raised in Plain City, Utah, before moving to Phoenix in the late 1960s.

Knight began transporting general commodities from Phoenix, Arizona, to Los Angeles, California. Starting with just a handful of trucks and one service center in Phoenix, Arizona, the company now runs a fleet of over 4,000 trucks and more than 8,700 trailers (dry, refrigerated, and brokerage). Revenues have grown from over 13 million in 1991 to over $866 million in 2011, with operating ratios at or near 80% year after year. They have grown from a few associates to more than 4,000, and from a family-owned business to a publicly held company trading on the New York Stock Exchange (KNX) in 1994.

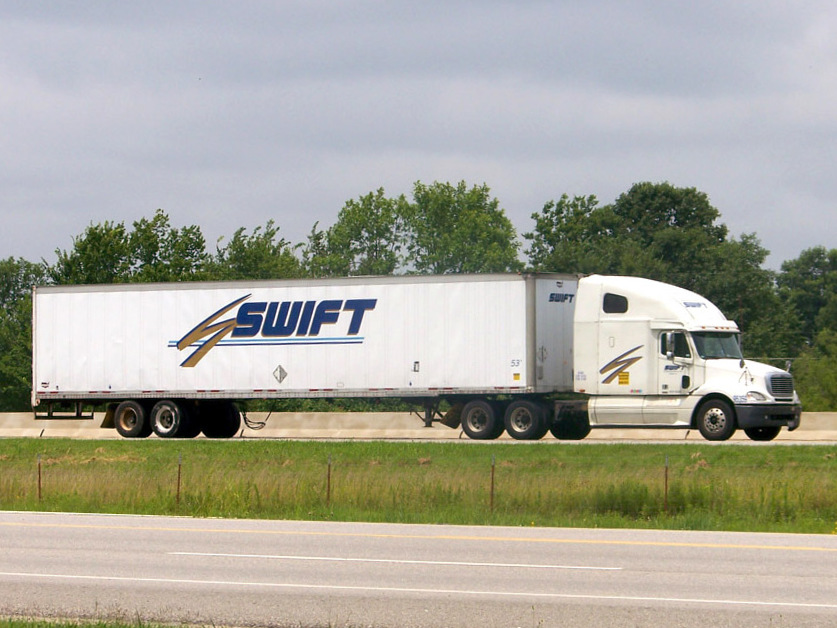
Swift Transportation semi

In 2017, Knight Transportation merged with Swift Transportation and Knight-Swift Transportation Holdings Inc. was formed to serve as the parent company for both carriers.

In 2019, Knight-Swift settled a $100 million class-action lawsuit alleging the company failed to classify 20,000 owner-operator drivers as employees. Drivers were not paid the minimum hourly wage in accordance with the Fair Labor Standards Act and had their rights violated under the forced labor statute. The lawsuit from March 11, 2009 is entitled Van Dusen, et al. v. Swift Transportation Co. of Arizona, LLC, et al.. The deadline for claimants to file was December 14, 2019.

Knight-Swift expanded from its core truckload market into less than truckload (LTL) freight in July 2021 when it acquired southeastern regional LTL firm AAA Cooper Transportation for US$1.35 billion.

Further acquisitions have expanded Knight-Swift's footprint in LTL including its January 2022 acquisition of Midwest Motor Express and July 2024 purchase of Los Angeles-based Dependable Highway Express, Inc. from Dependable Supply Chain Services. In July 2023 Knight-Swift acquired truckload carrier U.S. Xpress.

== Business ==
Knight engages in the transportation of general commodities in the United States. It provides asset-based dry van truckload and temperature controlled truckload carrier services primarily to short to medium lengths of haul. The company also offers non-asset-based brokerage services. As of 2022, the company operates 41 service centers (31 in the USA, 11 in Mexico), 5 secured yards in Canada, and Swift Truckload centers in housing dry vans, flatbed, refrigerated, and cross-border services.

Knight-Swift is ranked 66th in pay for drivers among major trucking companies. In 2022, Knight-Swift announced plans for using autonomous vehicles in its trucking lines, through a partnership with Embark Technology.
