= FreightCenter =

- Company type: Private
- Industry: Logistic Services
- Founded: 1998
- Headquarters: Tampa, Florida, United States
- Area served: North America
- Key people: Matthew Brosious (CEO & President)
- Products: Freight Forwarding Services Third-party Logistics
- Number of employees: 130 (2017)
- Subsidiaries: American Freight Companies
- Website: freightcenter.com

FreightCenter is a privately owned, non-asset based 3rd-party logistics provider (3PL) with headquarters in Palm Harbor, Florida, United States. FreightCenter acts as a conduit between freight carriers and commercial or residential shippers located in the United States and Canada. As a conduit, shippers use the provider's online freight quote calculator to calculate freight costs for less than truckload, truckload, rail, ocean and air freight.

== History ==
James and Matthew J. Brosious founded American Freight Companies, the parent company to FreightCenter, in September 1998. The company operates under MC 444954-B and offers $100,000 surety bond protection under Moving Ahead for Progress in the 21st Century Act legislation.

In 2010, FreightCenter and Go Daddy.com, LLC partnered on an integration of the provider's API Web services and Go Daddy's Quick Shopping Cart application. Users use the API to consume freight rates, quotes and booking data. The FreightCenter API is compatible with any business software, OMS, WMS, CMS, TMS, and eCommerce shopping carts, such as Magento and WooCommerce.

== Services ==
FreightCenter is used to search online for common carrier or trucking company rates, equipment and transit options.

List of services

- Online freight quotes
- EDI/API and manual carrier dispatch
- Provide shipping documents (bill of lading, shipping labels, etc.)
- Shipment tracking
- Route optimization
- Freight Audit & Spend Analysis
- Transportation Management System software
- API Web development
