= Freightquote =

Transportation broker of freight services

- Industry: Logistic Services
- Founded: 1998; 28 years ago
- Number of locations: Kansas City, Missouri, United States
- Key people: Tracy Kenison, Molly Schaar, Douglas Grojean
- Products: Transportation Brokerage Services
- Parent: C.H. Robinson Worldwide, Inc.
- Website: www.freightquote.com

Freightquote, a C.H. Robinson company, is an online transportation broker of freight services throughout North America, based in Kansas City, Missouri, United States. Their business provides comparisons of shipping rates for national and regional freight carriers.

== Services ==
Headquarters building in Kansas City, MO.

Freightquote developed a patented-technology platform to enable shippers to find competitive rates that can be compared for their freight shipments, similar to that which travel websites provide. Performed online, customers input freight shipment information online, review carrier options, choose a carrier, book shipments and pay for services. The company extends this platform through API connections. E-commerce websites integrate the company's technology to provide their customers with freight cost estimating and booking capabilities.

== History ==
Tim Barton founded Freightquote in August 1998.

In December 2006, Great Hill Partners signed a deal to acquire a minority interest in the company.

== C.H. Robinson acquisition ==
In early 2015, Freightquote was acquired by C.H. Robinson, a third-party logistics firm based in Eden Prairie, MN, specializing in logistics and supply chain services, including freight transportation. The acquisition connects C.H. Robinson's global supply chain services with the strong e-commerce presence and customer base of Freightquote.

== Sources ==
- Barry, David (January 20, 2010). "The $100 Million Revenue Club: Freightquote.com". The Wall Street Journal.
- (Associated Press) (January 28, 2014). "Freightquote plans to add 400 jobs in Kansas City". Columbia Daily Tribune.
- "Gov. Nixon joins company officials, Mayor James in opening new Freightquote corporate headquarters in Kansas City". Office of Missouri Governor Jay Nixon. July 16, 2013.
- "Freightquote breaks ground on Mo. offices". MSN News. Archived from the original on 17 March 2014. (video)
- Quinn, Kathy (August 14, 2012). "Freightquote.com Breaks Ground on New $44M Headquarters". Fox News (Kansas City).
- Stewart, Matt (July 16, 2013). "Freightquote leaves Kansas for Missouri". Fox News (Kansas City).
- Trucking in growth: Freightquote carries the revenue load by investing in service and technology - Kansas City Business Journal
- Freightquote.com buys Pennsylvania firm - Kansas City Business Journal
- Rafter, Dan (July 18, 2013). "RED Brokerage, Van Trust Real Estate bring online shipping company to Kansas City". RE Journals. Archived from the original on 17 March 2014.
