= U.S. Xpress =

American trucking company

- Type: Subsidiary
- Industry: Freight transport
- Founded: 1985
- Headquarters: Chattanooga, Tennessee, U.S.
- Parent: Knight-Swift
- Website: www.usxpress.com

U.S. Xpress (USX) is an American trucking company headquartered in Chattanooga, Tennessee, that has operated as a subsidiary of Knight-Swift since 2023. The company offers truckload shipping and other transportation services across the United States.

== History ==
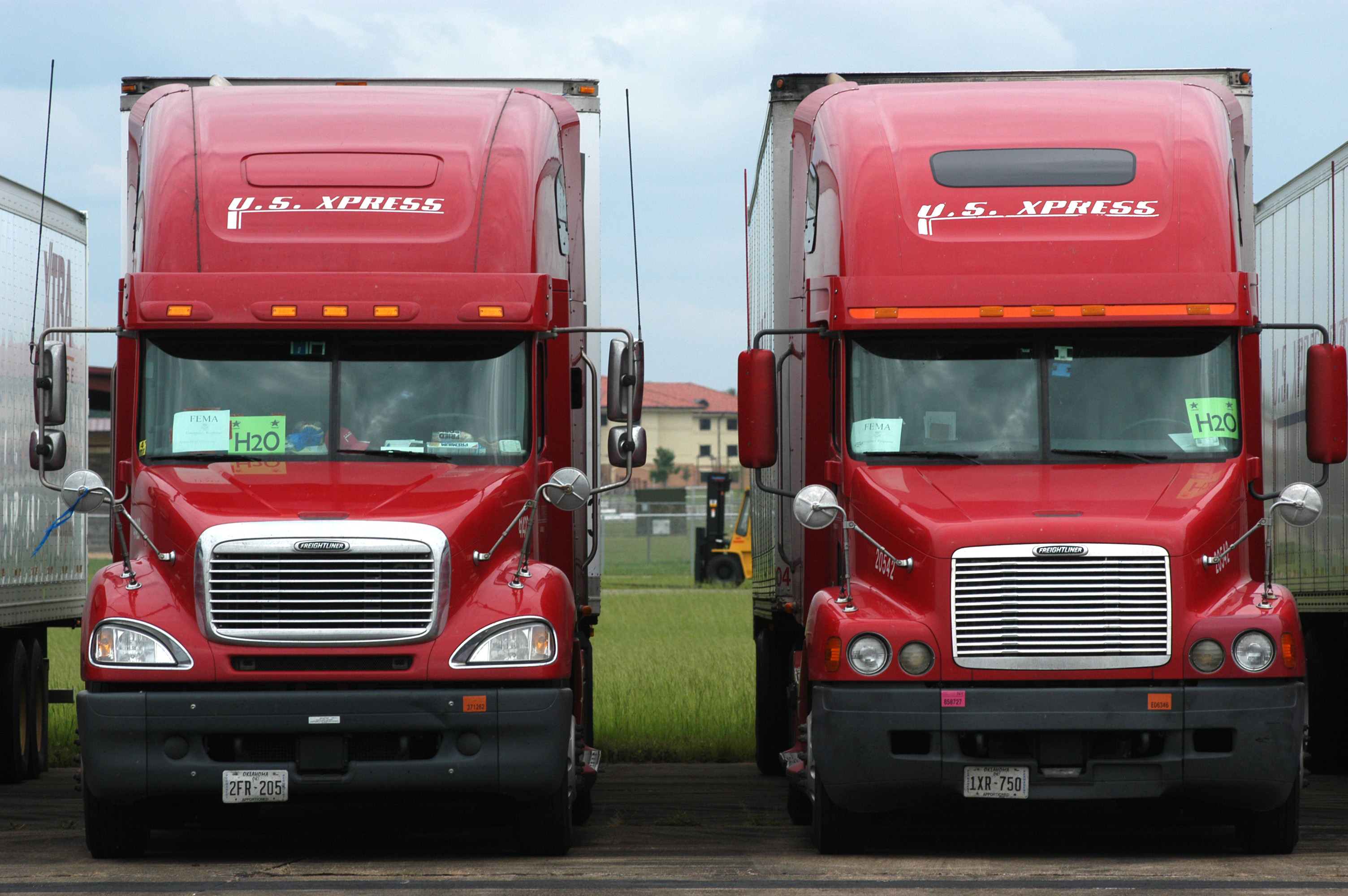
Two U.S. Xpress tractors in 2005

U.S. Xpress was founded in 1985 by Max Fuller and Patrick Quinn.

The company went public in 1994, selling 2.5 million shares of common stock. It entered a period of growth in the following years, acquiring a number of transportation companies throughout the country. By 1998, U.S. Xpress was the fifth-largest publicly traded trucking firm in the United States, with a fleet of more than 4,500 vehicles.

U.S. Xpress returned to private ownership in 2007, with Fuller and Quinn purchasing it from stockholders.

The company went public for a second time in 2018, raising more than $250 million through the stock launch. Investors later filed a lawsuit against the company, alleging that it failed to reveal information before the public offering that it was required to divulge under securities law.

On March 21, 2023, Knight-Swift Transportation Holdings, one of the largest truckload carriers in North America, announced an agreement to acquire U.S. Xpress for approximately $808 million.

== Operations ==
As of 2025, U.S. Xpress has a dedicated fleet of 2,000 trucks with 2,300 drivers. The company operates eleven terminals across the United States.
