= Global Van Lines =

Moving company

Global Van Lines, LLC
- Company type: Private agent-owned
- Industry: Moving and storage
- Founded: 1933
- Headquarters: Fort Wayne, Indiana, U.S.
- Website: www.globalvanlines.com

Global Van Lines, LLC is an international moving company founded in 1933 by George T. Howard as Howard Van Lines in Dallas, Texas. It took its present name in 1957 when it was acquired by Trans-Ocean Van Service of Long Beach, California.

It was acquired in 1981 by WKG Corporation of Houston, Texas, and sold to Contrans Corporation in 1985. In 1990, Global agents acquired the company making it similar in form to a cooperative. It was acquired by Interstate Van Lines in 1998 and sold to Allied Worldwide in 2000, which became SIRVA. Global Van Lines previously held its world headquarters at the northeastern edge of Disneyland in Anaheim, California, where it was also a corporate sponsor. The mid-century modern building was razed in the 1990s and is now home to the Frank Gehry-designed Team Disney Anaheim. In 2000, SIRVA moved Global Van Lines headquarters to Fort Wayne, Indiana.
