= Drayage =

Transport of goods over a short distance

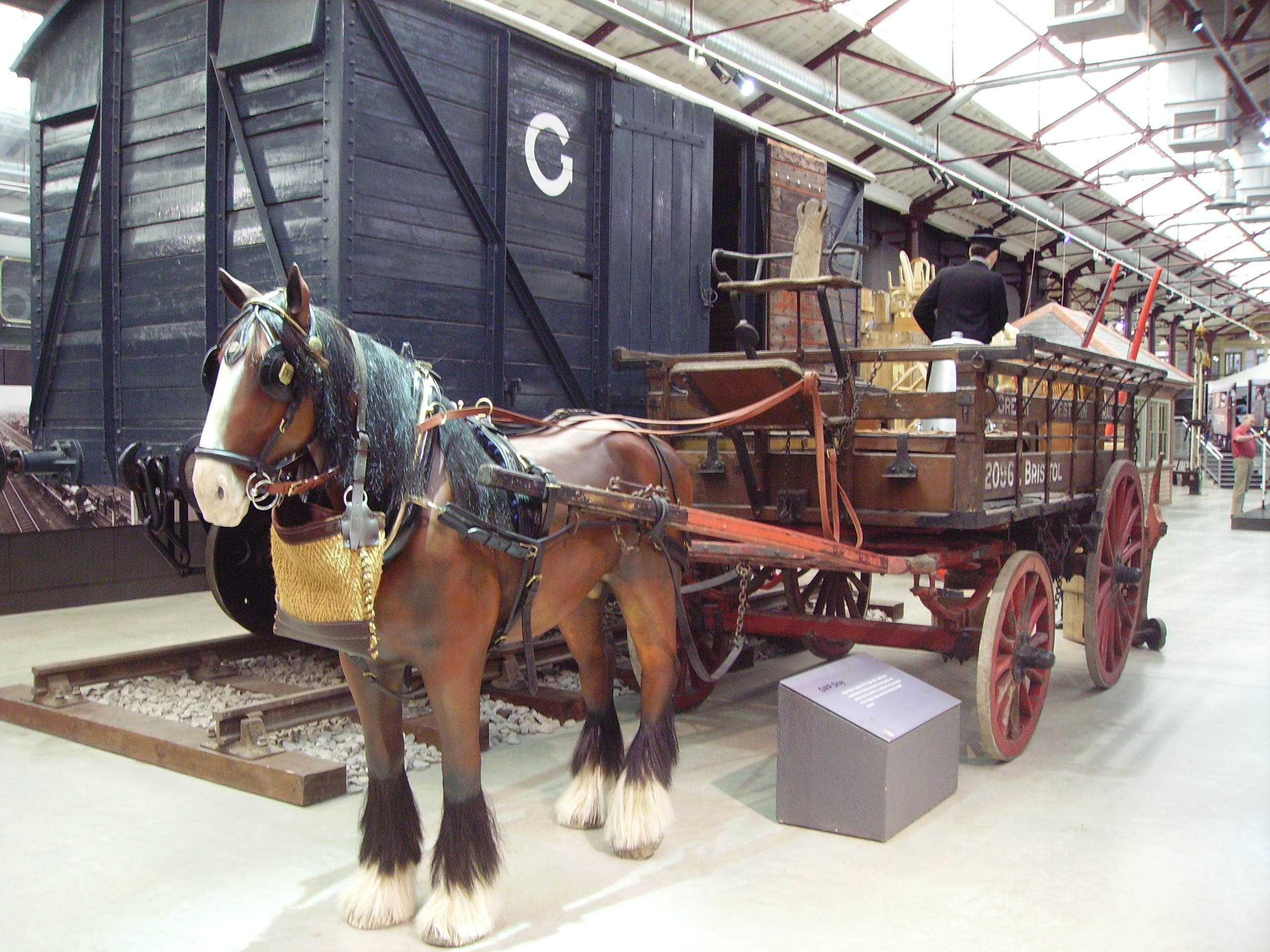
A dray at a railroad car, modeled at the Steam Museum in Swindon, UK

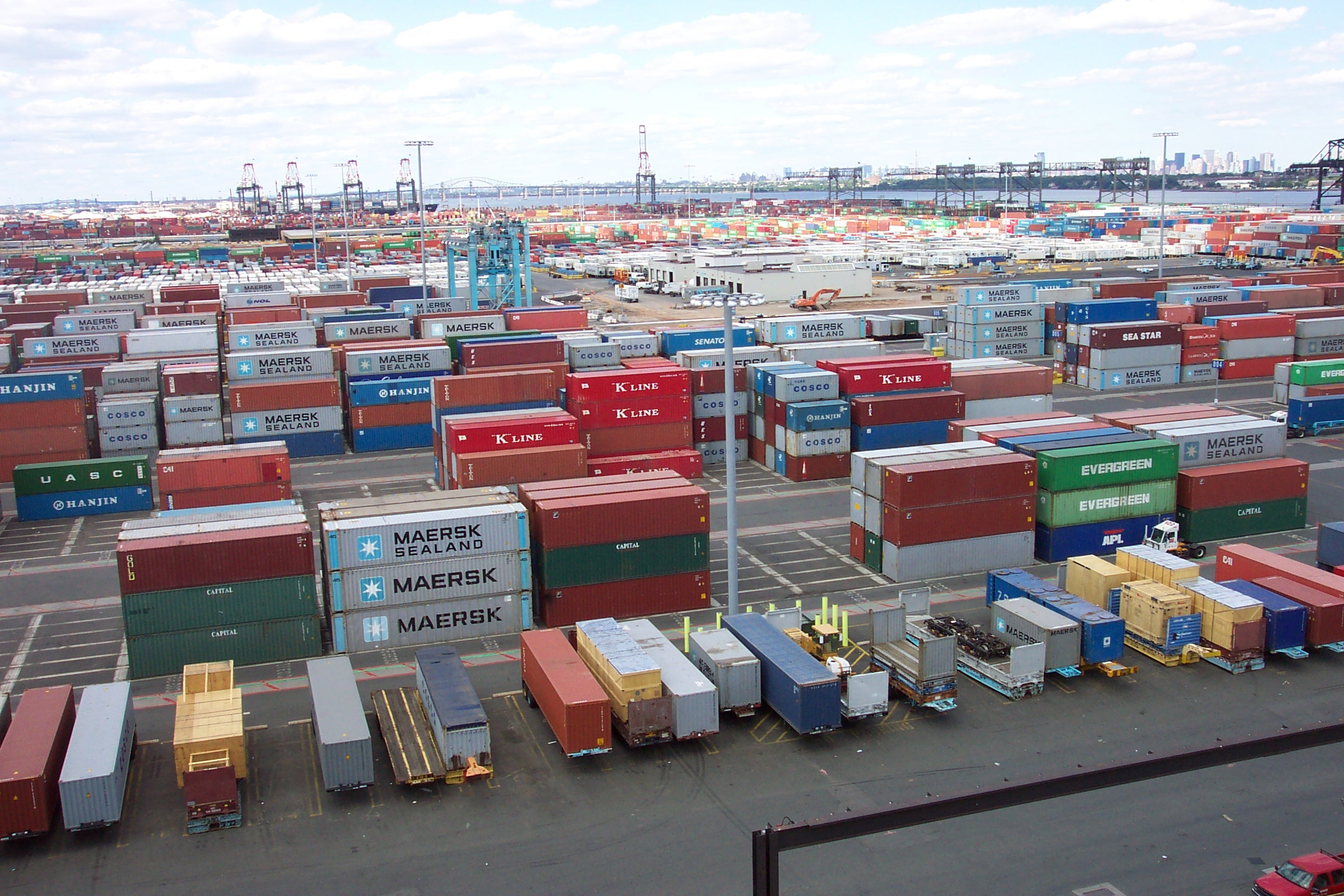
Shipping containers at the terminal at Port Elizabeth, New Jersey. Units in the foreground have been placed on chassis and await drayage to their destination.

Drayage is the transportation of shipping containers by truck to their final destination. Drayage is often part of a longer overall move, such as from a ship to a warehouse. Some research defines it specifically as "a truck pickup from or delivery to a seaport, border point, inland port, or intermodal terminal with both the trip origin and destination in the same urban area". Port drayage is the term used when describing short hauls from ports and other areas to nearby locations. It can also refer to the movement of goods within large buildings such as convention centers. Drayage is a key aspect of the transfer of shipments to and from other means of transportation. The term drayage is also used for the fee paid for such services.

Domestic drayage is when product from a marine container is transloaded into a 53-foot domestic container and then moved inland. Marine drayage is when the product remains in the marine container until it reaches its final destination. Every import or export that arrives or leaves an ocean port must at some point be moved by drayage.

An estimated 30 million marine containers move in and out of the United States on an annual basis. Each one of these containers require at least two drayage moves.

== History ==
The term originally meant "to transport by a sideless cart", or dray. Such carts, pulled by dray horses, were used to move goods short distances, limited by the physical limitations of a dray horse. Dray activities generally occurred at marine ports, spreading to canal and rail terminals. Over time, the dray horse was replaced by the semi-truck tractor.

The study of drayage is a relatively new area, as recent events have elevated the prominence of the dray industry. Economically, NAFTA and the growth of globalized trade have dramatically increased imports and exports that are shipped in marine shipping containers. Furthermore, the rise in fuel costs has limited the options for cost-cutting along the supply chain. Although drayage is a very small component (both in terms of time and distance) of the supply chain, its cost and potential problems can be disproportionately high.

In intermodal freight transport, marine drayage is the transport of containerized cargo by specialized trucking companies between ocean ports or rail ramps and shipping docks. Once the cargo is loaded into a container, it is not touched again until it reaches its destination.

According to logistics industry publication FreightWaves, legacy players in the domestic drayage industry include J. B. Hunt Transport Services, Hub Group, Schneider National, XPO, Inc., and Swift Transportation. The largest marine drayage company in the United States is IMC Companies. There are also a number of drayage tech startups, including Dray Alliance, DrayNow, and Book Your Cargo who create software that brokers to drayage companies.

== Marine versus domestic drayage ==
Domestic drayage: In domestic drayage, product from a marine container is transloaded into a 53-foot domestic container and then moved inland.

Marine drayage: In marine drayage, the product remains in the marine container until it reaches its final destination. Every shipping container that arrives or leaves an ocean port must at some point be moved by marine drayage.
