= Give Kids the World Village =

Nonprofit resort in Florida for critically ill children

Coordinates: 28.290324°N 81.457508°W

Give Kids The World Village
- Formation: 1986; 40 years ago
- Founder: Henri Landwirth
- Purpose: Nonprofit resort for critically ill children and their families
- Headquarters: Kissimmee, Florida
- Location: Kissimmee, Florida
- Region served: Worldwide
- President: Caroline Schumacher
- Main organ: Board of Directors
- Budget: $31.6 million US
- Website: www.gktw.org

Give Kids The World Village is an 89-acre nonprofit resort in Kissimmee, Florida that provides critically ill children and their families with week-long wish vacations at no cost.

Half of all critically ill children eligible for a wish choose to visit Central Florida and its theme parks. Give Kids The World aims to fulfill that wish, providing children and their families with all-inclusive vacations including more than 200,000 families from all 50 U.S. states and 77 countries throughout its history. It has been given a four-star rating from Charity Navigator for 15 years in a row, a rating in the top 1% of U.S. charities.

== History ==
Give Kids The World was founded by Henri Landwirth. Henri was a Holocaust survivor. Born in Antwerp, Belgium, Henri spent five years in the Auschwitz and Matthausen concentration camps during World War II.By the war's end, both of his parents had been killed, but Henri and his twin sister, Margot, survived and were reunited. Henri then immigrated to America on a freight ship. He was soon drafted into the U.S. Army and served during the Korean War. After his service, Henri used the G.I. Bill to study hotel management while working the night desk at Manhattan's Wellington Hotel. After everything that he went through, he promised himself that one day, God willing, he would be able to help other people never suffer as much as he did.He then dedicated his life to a life full of giving.

Landwirth moved to Florida in 1954 and began to manage the 100-room Starlite Motel in Cocoa Beach, near Cape Canaveral.This was followed by him opening a franchised Holiday Inn in Orlando. Following a successful, career in the hotel industry, Henri devoted himself to improving the lives of those in need through numerous foundations and nonprofit organizations that he founded.

In the 1980s, Henri began offering complimentary hotel rooms to children with life-threatening illnesses who wished to visit Walt Disney World. Ultimately, the story of Give Kids The World began with a little girl named Amy. Amy had Leukemia and wished to visit Orlando's theme parks. To facilitate this wish, a respected hotelier was asked to provide a complimentary stay for Amy and her family. Although the hotelier gladly obliged, the remainder of Amy's travel plans took too long to arrange, and Amy passed away without visiting. He created Give Kids The World with the goal of preventing such a wish from ever going unfulfilled again.

In 1986, with the support of multiple partners and individuals, Henri founded Give Kids The World Village. The Village now encompasses 89 acres, 166 private wish family villas, and an array of accessible rides, attractions and venues.

== The Village ==
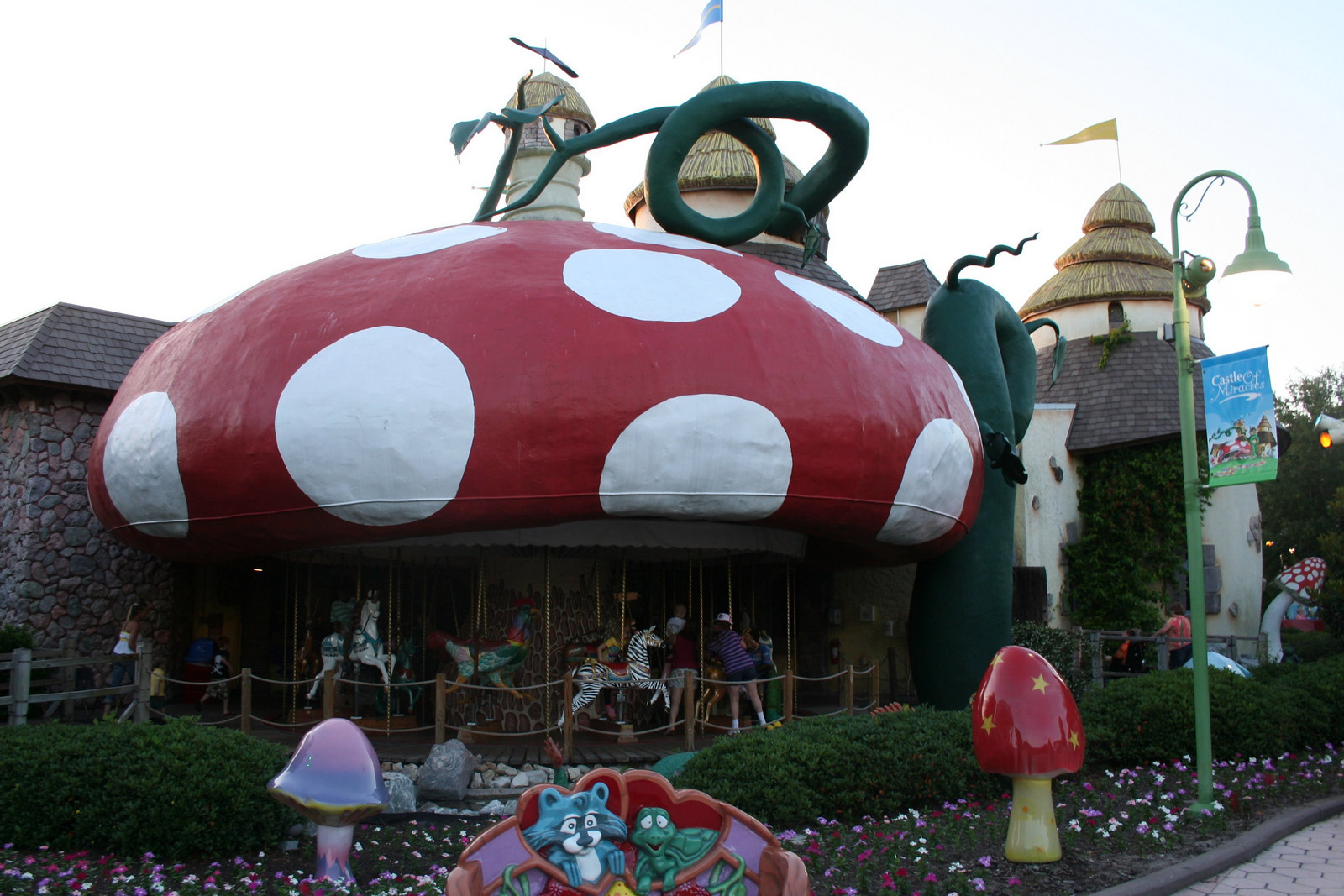
The Enchanted Carousel at Give Kids The World Village

Give Kids The World Village is an 89-acre, nonprofit resort in Kissimmee, Florida. It provides cost-free vacations to critically ill kids and their families from around the world who want to visit Central Florida.

Families enjoy all meals and snacks cost-free. The Village is made possible by the support of donors and community partners.

The Village encompasses 166 private storybook villas, four accessible rides and many family-friendly attractions. Attractions include the Enchanted Carousel, the Jurassic Junction (JJ's) train experience, Kelly's Sunny Swing and Lori's Magical Flight, the Gingerbread House Restaurant, the Serendipity pirate-themed entertainment stage, two wheelchair accessible pools, Jack's Wacky WaterWorks splash pad, horseback riding, a nature trail, gardens and koi pond, Henri's Starlite Scoops, a space-themed accessible ice cream parlor, Jersey Jaxson's Playroom, Julie's Safari Theater, Matthew's Boundless Playground (featuring the world's largest game of Candy Land), Amberville Train Station, Marc’s Dino Putt, the Happy Harbor Fishing Pond, a chapel, and the Castle of Miracles (where the stars of every child who has visited are displayed on the ceiling). During a typical year, volunteers fill approximately 1,800 volunteer shifts each week. With the help of many individuals, Give Kids The World has welcomed more than 200,000 families from all 50 states and 77 countries.

=== Wish program ===
See main article: Make-A-Wish Foundation

Children between the ages of 3 and 18 who have been diagnosed with a critical illness by a licensed doctor are eligible for a Give Kids The World wish. More than 250 wish-granting organizations around the world determine the eligibility of each child and work with Give Kids The World to arrange each wish.
