= AAA Cooper Transportation =

American trucking company

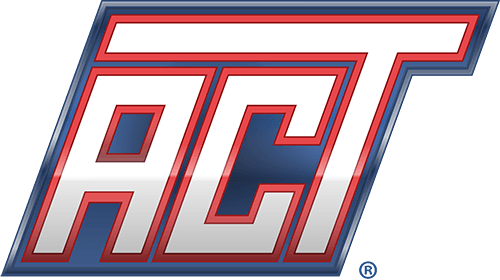
- Formerly: P.C. White Truck Lines (before 1955); AAA Motor Lines (1955–1969)
- Company type: Subsidiary
- Industry: Transportation
- Founded: 1955; 71 years ago
- Founder: John H. "Red" Dove
- Headquarters: Dothan, Alabama, U.S.
- Key people: G. Mack Dove (chairman); Reid Dove (president and CEO); Charlie Prickett (EVP and COO); Steve Roy (CFO)
- Services: Less-than-truckload shipping
- Revenue: US$780 million (2021 est.)
- Net income: US$80 million (2021 est.)
- Number of employees: 4,500
- Parent: Knight-Swift Transportation Holdings (since 2021)
- Website: aaacooper.com

AAA Cooper Transportation (ACT) is an American, non-union less-than-truckload (LTL) freight carrier based in Dothan, Alabama. The company also provides dedicated, port, and international freight transportation. The company was founded in 1955 by John H. Dove after he purchased an interest in P.C. White Truck Lines. It was owned and operated by the Dove family for most of its history.

In July 2021, ACT was acquired by the largest truckload carrier in the US, Knight-Swift, for US$1.35 billion with plans for the company to continue to operate as a wholly owned subsidiary.

== Company history ==
In the 1930s, John H. "Red" Dove began his association with the transportation industry by working with his father hauling logs from the Alabama woods to sawmills. In 1951, Mr. Dove bought an interest in P.C. White Truck Lines. In 1955, he purchased the remaining ownership interest in P.C. White Truck Lines and changed the name to AAA Motor Lines. His sons, Earl and Mack Dove, received their degrees in Transportation from the University of Tennessee and joined the family firm between 1959 and 1962.

The decades of the 1950s, 1960s, and the early 1970s were a time of regulation by the Interstate Commerce Commission (ICC), a former independent agency of the U.S. government. The company growth potential would be limited to purchasing other operating routes, or companies who possessed routes that were not being operated to their greatest potential. Thus, in 1969, AAA Motor Lines Inc., bought Cooper Transfer Company Inc. The resulting company was renamed AAA Cooper Transportation in 1973.

In 1973 Mack and Earl Dove recognized the beginning industry deregulation and began to position the company for that occurrence through improved cost measurement systems and management training. In 1976, the company obtained approval from the (ICC) to serve all of Florida. Deregulation of the industry began in July 1980 with the passage of Motor Carrier Act of 1980. Meanwhile, ACT completed its opening of Florida and in 1978 bought expansive authority to operate in Georgia, North and South Carolina. As a result, the company entered the decade of the 70's with $3 million in annual sales and ended the decade with $43 million in sales.

ACT continued its expansion during the 1980s by purchasing Haynes Motor Lines in 1986 which added nine new terminals In January 1989, Earl sold his 50% ownership in the company to Mack. In early 1990, ACT purchased nine terminals from the former Bowman Transportation Company. These facilities were used for new terminal openings and relocating certain existing terminals for expanded and improved service. By 1989, annual sales had increased to $136 million.

In 1994, ACT opened its first terminal outside of the Southeast in Chicago. Later that year, ACT opened a terminal in Minneapolis. Reid Dove, Mack Dove's son, became president of the company in 2001.

On July 5, 2021, the largest truckload carrier in the US, Phoenix, Arizona-based Knight-Swift Transportation Holdings, acquired AAA Cooper for US$1.35 billion. ACT CEO Reid Dove was appointed to the Knight-Swift board with ACT continuing under its own brand from its existing headquarters as a subsidiary of Knight-Swift.

Knight-Swift is the parent of truckload carriers Knight Transportation and Swift Transportation as well as several other subsidiaries in the truckload and intermodal markets. Before acquiring ACT, Knight-Swift as a whole operated 18,500 tractors and 54,600 trailers, the largest tractor fleet in the US. Following its acquisition of ACT, Knight-Swift indicated it intended to look for other acquisitions in the LTL market.

In June 2024, Charlie Prickett was announced as CEO, replacing Reid Dove who became board chairman.

== Operations ==
In 1997, "Truck-to-Ship-to-Truck" service was added for the island of Puerto Rico. ACT's international service also extends to Canada, Mexico, the Caribbean, Latin America, Europe, Asia, Africa and Australia.

A Dedicated Contract Carriage offering was formally established in 2002 and as a result, it expanded the LTL service to all of Texas and Cincinnati in 2005. In 2006 annual revenue of the company surpassed $500 million for the first time.

As of 6 July 2021, ACT operated 70 terminals (90% owned, the rest leased) with a total door count over 3,400, 3,000 tractors, and 7,000 trailers in the southeast and midwest US and projected 2021 profits would be US$80 million on revenues of US$780 million. The company offers service outside its home area through affiliate agreements with other regional and national LTL carriers.
