= Covenant Logistics =

American shipping company

Covenant Logistics Group, Inc.
- Formerly: Covenant Transport, Inc.
- Type: Public
- Traded as: NYSE: CVLG; Russell 2000 Component
- Industry: Transportation
- Founded: 1986; 40 years ago in Chattanooga, Tennessee
- Founder: David Parker
- Headquarters: Chattanooga, Tennessee
- Area served: United States and Canada
- Website: www.covenantlogistics.com

Covenant Logistics Group, Inc. (formerly Covenant Transport, Inc.) is an American company focused on truckload shipping. The company is headquartered in Chattanooga, Tennessee, and is publicly traded on the New York Stock Exchange. The company provides temperature controlled trucking, regional delivery, and longhaul team driver delivery.

== History ==
Covenant was founded in 1986 by David and Jacqueline Parker, with 25 trucks and 50 trailers.

In July 2018, Covenant Transport acquired Landair Holdings Inc., the parent of Landair Transport and Landair Logistics.

Covenant Transport rebranded as Covenant Logistics in 2021 following its acquisition of Landair Holdings.

In April of 2023, Covenant Logistics acquired Lew Thompson & Son Trucking, a company based out of Northern Arkansas that specialized in live haul transportation.

== Operations ==
The company now jointly operates over 3,000 trucks and 7,000 trailers with sister companies Southern Refrigerated Transport, Inc. (Texarkana, Arkansas), Star Transportation Inc. (La Vergne, Tennessee) and Landair Transportation, Inc. (Greeneville, Tennessee). The four companies have shared terminals in Chattanooga, Hutchins, Texas, Pomona, California, Texarkana, Arkansas, La Vergne, Allentown, Pennsylvania, Orlando, Florida, and Greenville.

In addition to the four asset-based companies, CTG owns a freight brokerage company, Covenant Transport Solutions, and an accounts receivable factoring company for smaller trucking companies, Transport Financial Solutions, both based in Chattanooga. CTG has a 49% stake in Transport Enterprise Leasing, a tractor and trailer leasing company that caters to smaller fleets and captive owner-operator programs, in addition to used tractor and trailer sales.

== See also ==
- Ozburn-Hessey Logistics
