= Pacer International =

American intermodal transportation company

Pacer
- Industry: Intermodal (53’ containers)
- Founded: 1997
- Headquarters: Divisional headquarters: Dublin, Ohio, United States
- Key people: Paul V. Smith, President–Intermodal Services
- Services: Domestic Intermodal, Cross-border Mexico Intermodal, Drayage
- Parent: STG Logistics; 2022–present XPO, Inc. 2014–2022
- Website: www.pacer.com

The "Pacer Stacktrain" logo used on containers and trailers owned by Pacer International

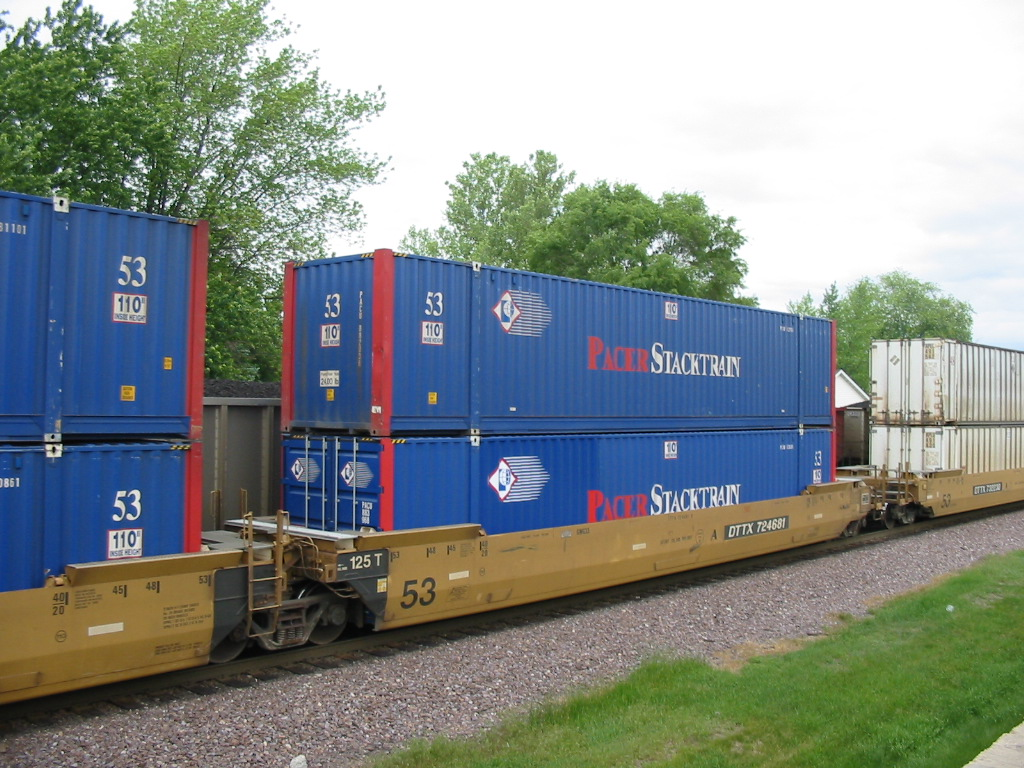
A portion of a "double stack" container train operated by Union Pacific Railroad, the containers owned by Pacer Stacktrain, the well cars by DTTX

Pacer International, also known as Pacer Stacktrain, is a former major North American provider of intermodal services that was owned by XPO, Inc. (NYSE: XPO), which in 2022 sold it to STG Logistics. In January 2026, STG Logistics filed for Chapter 11 bankruptcy protection following a debt deal that sparked litigation by creditors.

With the acquisition of Pacer International on March 31, 2014, XPO, Inc. became the third largest provider of intermodal services in North America and the largest provider of cross-border Mexico intermodal. The business facilitates one of the most comprehensive double-stack intermodal networks in North America, with access to more than 60,000 miles (97,000 km) of rail routes and a nationwide relationships with independent truck drayage carriers.

The former Pacer operations have been integrated into the XPO, Inc. service offering, which includes truck brokerage, intermodal, ground and air expedition, last mile logistics, contract logistics, freight forwarding, less-than-truckload brokerage and managed transportation.

== Company history ==
- 1984: Don Orris leads the development of the first cost-effective double-stack rail network service, an innovation that led to a major change in the movement of domestic goods within the United States, Mexico, and Canada. Orris would go on to found Pacer International.
- 1997: Don Orris, chairman and CEO, founds Pacer International when he begins acquiring the 14 small-to-medium-sized companies in transportation, third party logistics, intermodal marketing, drayage, and ocean transportation.
- 1999: Pacer acquires APL Stacktrain and operates the new business unit as Pacer Stacktrain.
- 2001: Pacer consolidates its transportation and logistics brokerage services in its subsidiary Pacer Global Logistics. This unit was renamed Pacer Transportation Solutions in 2008.
- 2002: Ajay Amlani is hired to lead strategic initiatives at the company and lead its IPO process.
- 2002: Pacer becomes a public company (NASDAQ: PACR).
- 2006: Michael E. Uremovich is appointed Chairman and CEO.
- 2008:
  - Pacer's intermodal network doubles in size with the addition of BNSF service routes.
  - Pacer begins expansion of its truck brokerage and highway services units.
- 2009: Daniel W. Avramovich is appointed Chairman and CEO.
- 2014: On March 31, XPO, Inc. completed the acquisition of Pacer International. Paul Smith was subsequently appointed as President–Intermodal Operations.

== Operating structure ==
The former Pacer intermodal operations are part of the XPO, Inc. freight brokerage business segment.
