= American Moving & Storage Association =

Defunct organization

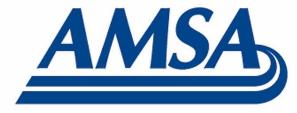
- Merged into: American Trucking Associations
- Successor: Moving and Storage Conference
- Formation: 1920 (precursor)
- Defunct: 2020
- Type: trade association
- Headquarters: Alexandria, Virginia
- Location: United States
- Members: 4,000

The American Moving & Storage Association (AMSA) was the non-profit trade association representing members of the professional moving industry based primarily in the United States. Its approximately 4,000 members consisted of van lines, their agents, independent movers, forwarders, industry suppliers, and certain individuals and organizations (AMSA did not represent the self-storage industry).

AMSA administered the industry’s ProMover quality certification program, aimed at consumers. It offered its members professional training and certification and provided them with federal government representation, statistical industry reporting, arbitration services for loss or damage claims, safety and compliance guidance, federal government rate filing, professional conferences, public relations, publications, and annual safety and quality awards. It published a bimonthly magazine, Direction, and a quarterly data summary, Industry Trends. Based in Alexandria, Virginia, AMSA was affiliated with 27 state moving associations and several international moving associations. Its Moving & Storage Institute, founded in 2001, sponsored industry research and scholarships.

In 2020, AMSA was absorbed by the American Trucking Associations.

== History ==
AMSA was the result of three predecessors merging over time: the National Moving & Storage Association (NMSA), the American Movers Conference (AMC), and the Household Goods Carriers’ Bureau (HGCB).

The NMSA, the first national U.S. trade association for movers, was founded on Mackinac Island, Michigan in 1920 as the National Furniture Warehousemen’s Association and later became headquartered in Chicago, Illinois. In 1935, the Household Goods Movers’ Group of the American Trucking Association was formed as a separate trade organization, changing its name in 1962 to the American Movers Conference. The HGCB was established in 1936 to help carriers comply with the Motor Carrier Act of 1935. In 1994, the AMC and the HGCB merged; and in 1998, the AMC and the NMSA merged to form American Moving & Storage Association.

In December 2020, AMSA was absorbed by the American Trucking Associations and became known as the Moving and Storage Conference.

== Membership ==
Member companies included local, national and international firms and their suppliers offering moving and associated storage services for households and businesses; crating and transportation for sensitive freight including trade show displays, electronics, scientific and medical equipment, privately owned automobiles, fine art, and equipment for college and professional sports teams; and increasingly, portable on-demand storage and records storage and management. Specialized services may have included climate-controlled storage for items such as furs, wine, film, rugs, art, magnetic tape, and documents. Many AMSA members engaged in supply chain warehousing.

Members also handled national and international employee relocation and personal property moves for the private sector and U.S. government agencies such as the State Department (through the General Services Administration) as well as for active duty U.S. military personnel (Department of Defense business represented the industry's largest single customer). AMSA hosted GSA's Household Goods and Freight Forum at its annual conference from 2008 to 2012.

Members engaged in moving must have abided by an ethical code of conduct and comply with state, or for interstate moves, federal transportation safety and consumer protection regulations.

Membership was also open to industry affiliates (companies which provided specialized services or products, work collaboratively with industry businesses, used industry services, or whose own clientele was involved in or impacted by the move process); individuals (industry employees, van operators, and others whose work was impacted by the moving and storage sector); and professional and trade associations, including state, regional, national and international moving associations and related industry professional organizations.

== ProMover program ==
=== Interstate moves ===
In January 2008, to help consumers avoid unscrupulous or illegitimate movers (many proliferating on the Internet), AMSA created the ProMover certification program for its members that have federal interstate operating authority. Such members must have passed an annual criminal background check, have been licensed by the Federal Motor Carrier Safety Administration (FMCSA), and had to agree to abide by ethical standards such as honesty in advertising and in business transactions with customers. Each ProMover also signed a contract to commit to adhere to applicable Surface Transportation Board and FMSCA regulations. AMSA also examined company ownership and registration with state corporation commissions, and the mover must maintain at least a satisfactory rating with the Better Business Bureau. Those that passed were authorized to display the ProMover logo on their websites and in marketing materials; those that fail were expelled from the program (and from AMSA) if they could not correct discrepancies during a probationary period.

=== Intrastate moves ===
In October 2010, AMSA began a two-year pilot program with the California Moving & Storage Association, the first time ProMover certification was made available to qualified movers operating only within a state. The program later became permanent. In April 2012, intrastate movers in Michigan became eligible; and the Florida ProMover program began in February 2013.
