= Averitt Express =

American supply chain management company

- Type: Privately held company
- Industry: Transportation and supply chain management
- Founder: Thurman Averitt
- Headquarters: Cookeville, Tennessee, U.S.
- Owner: Gary Sasser
- Number of employees: 9,000

Averitt Express is an American transportation and supply chain management company based in Cookeville, Tennessee.

== History ==
The company was founded as Livingston Merchant's Co-op in 1958 and incorporated as Averitt Express in 1969. Averitt is owned by Gary Sasser, who purchased the company from its original owner, Thurman Averitt, in October 1971 at the age of 20. At the time of Sasser's purchase, Averitt operated 3 trucks and 5 trailers.

In 2021, Averitt purchased a 25,000 square-feet distribution center in Amarillo and opened new locations in Grand Prairie, Houston, and Laredo, TX.

In 2022, Averitt Express opened a new distribution and fulfillment facility in the Memphis area. The new center is a 260,000 square-feet, adding to their 2.4 million square-feet of space over their 40+ locations.

Averitt opened another distribution and fulfillment center in Louisville, Kentucky, that spans over 340,000 square-feet.

In May 2026, Averitt announced an investment that could exceed $113 million in a new regional distribution and logistics transportation campus in Bullitt County, Kentucky.

== Service area ==
Averitt Express runs primarily in 18 states in the Southeast United States, including Florida, Georgia, South Carolina, North Carolina, Alabama, Mississippi, Virginia, Kentucky, Texas, Oklahoma, Arkansas, Tennessee, and Louisiana. They also have single terminals in California, Ohio, Wisconsin, Missouri, and Illinois.

== Transportation services ==
Averitt Express provides the following services:

- Climate controlled
- Cross-border (Canada, Mexico, Puerto Rico/Virgin Islands)
- Dedicated
- Expedited/time critical
- Intermodal
- International (ocean/air, Asia-Memphis Express)
- Less than truckload shipping (LTL) (regional, nationwide, distribution/consolidation)
- Portside
- Retail services (general retail, retail distribution)
- Transportation management
- Truckload (dry van, flatbed, truckload brokerage)
- Air charter
- Value-added services (national call center)
- Warehousing
- Supply chain
- Integrated services

== Charity work ==
Averitt Cares for Kids is a non-profit organization that is funded by associates of Averitt Express and is managed by the company associated with St. Jude's Children's Hospital.

In 2023, Averitt Express donated $1,200,001 to St. Jude Children's Hospital. Most of the funds were donated through an employee program in which about 94% of Averitt employees donated minimum of $1 per week to the Averitt Cares for Kids fund.

== Awards ==
Averitt Express has won many quality awards for environmental responsibility, publication service, and safety, as well as many customer service awards from companies including Walmart, Dollar General, General Motors, Jack Daniels, etc.

In March 2024, Averitt Express won Extensiv's Powerhouse Award for the company's analytics implementation.
