= Hub Group =

American transportation and logistics company

Hub Group, Inc.
- Type: Public
- Traded as: Nasdaq: HUBG (Class A); S&P 600 component
- Industry: Freight transport; Logistics
- Founded: 1971; 55 years ago in Hinsdale, Illinois, U.S.
- Founder: Phillip Yeager
- Headquarters: Oak Brook, Illinois
- Number of locations: 33
- Area served: North America
- Key people: Phillip D. Yeager (CEO)
- Services: Supply chain solutions; Logistics; Transportation
- Revenue: ▼US$3.7 billion (2019)
- Operating income: ▲US$152 million (2019)
- Net income: ▲US$107 million (2019)
- Total assets: ▲US$1.9 billion (2019)
- Total equity: ▲US$1.07 billion (2019)
- Number of employees: 2,000+ (2019)
- Website: hubgroup.com

Hub Group, Inc. is a transportation and logistics management company in North America. A publicly traded company with over $5 billion in revenue, Hub Group was founded in 1971 by Phillip Yeager, and is currently run by his grandson, Phillip D. Yeager. The company went public in 1996, and is headquartered in Oak Brook, Illinois.

== History ==
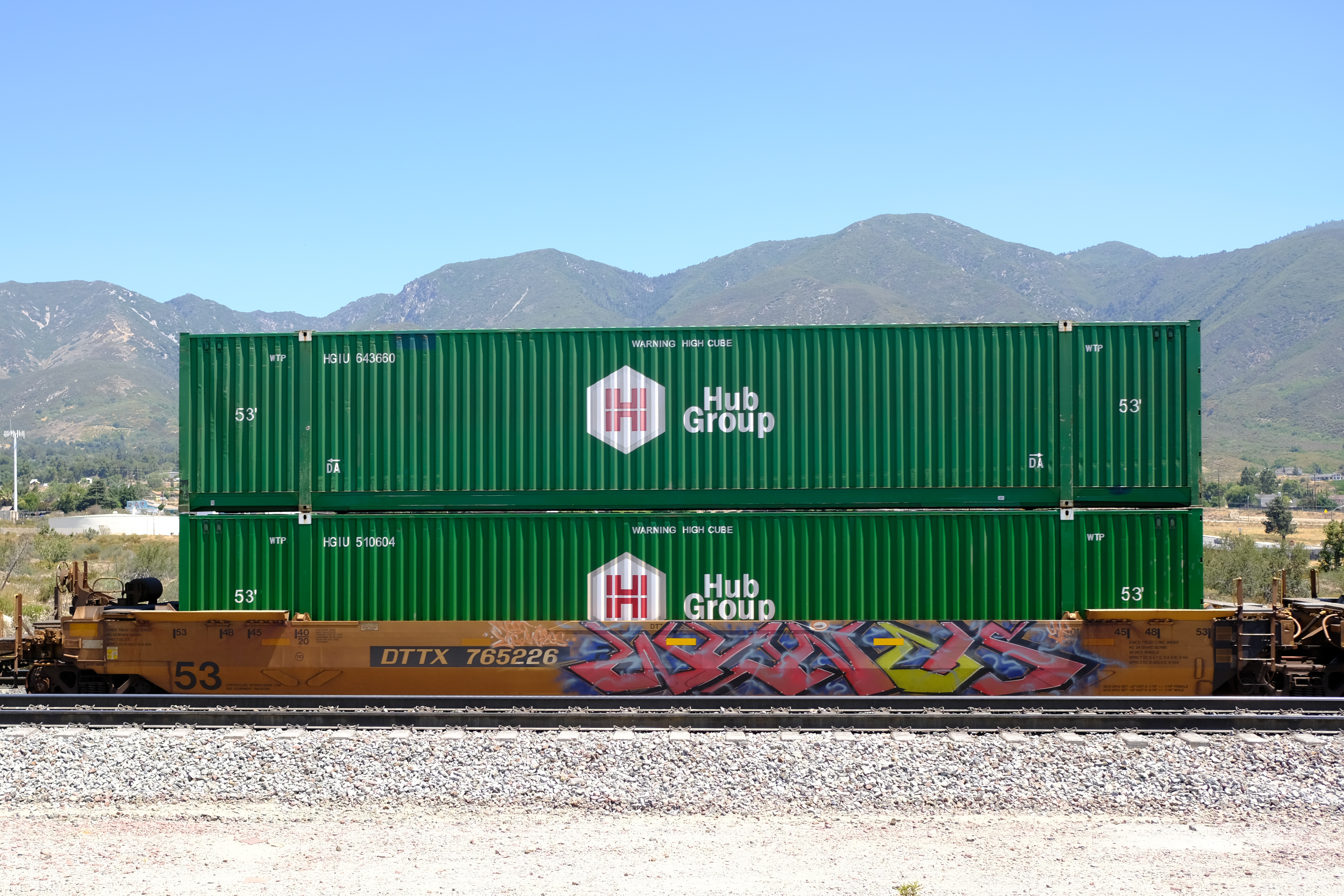
Hub Group intermodal containers being transported by rail in 2020

In 1971, Phillip and Joyce Yeager founded Hub Group (then known as Hub City Terminals) in Hinsdale, Illinois. The company was started with $10,000 and was located in a windowless, one-room office above a flower shop. The 43-year-old Phillip Yeager quit his job at the Pennsylvania Railroad, where he had worked for 19 years, to create Hub Group. At the time of its formation, Hub City Terminals worked as a shipper's agent, which was an intermediary that booked intermodal transportation with railroads.

In 1975, Yeager and his wife set up a series of S corporations to expand their business. Each office operated separately and had its own profit-and-loss center. Hub City Terminals was renamed Hub Group in 1985.

In 1995, Phillip Yeager’s son, David Yeager, became chief executive officer of Hub Group. He had been with the company since 1975, when he opened the company's Pittsburgh, Pennsylvania regional office. David Yeager became Vice-Chairman of the company in 1992.

In 1996, Hub Group held an initial public offering. A year later, the company became the first intermodal marketing company to top $1 billion in yearly revenue. Hub Group had 34 regional offices by 1998, when the company borrowed $100 million to begin purchasing all outstanding minority interests in the company's regional offices.

The company moved from a geography-based operation with multiple regional offices to a centralized operation with a single profit-and-loss center headquartered in Lombard, Illinois in 2004. The reorganization effort allowed Hub Group to compete as a single network.

Hub Group acquired Memphis, Tennessee-based drayage company Comtrak Logistics for $48 million in 2006. The two companies had worked together for over 20 years by the time of the acquisition. The deal included Comtrak's client lists and proprietary transportation tracking software.

Hub Group founder and chairman Phillip Yeager died in October 2008 from complications following a heart attack. Yeager was 80 years old. Company CEO David Yeager became chairman of Hub Group in November 2008.

In 2017, Hub Group acquired Estenson Logistics, a national provider of dedicated trucking with nearly 100 operating sites for around $306 million. As a part of the acquisition, the name was retired and now operates under the Hub Group brand.

In 2018, Hub Group sold its Mode Transportation subsidiary and acquired CaseStack Logistics, a consolidation and warehousing provider that predominantly operates in the consumer packaged goods and retail space, for $225 million. CaseStack now operates under a product of Hub Group called CaseStack Retail Supplier Solutions.

In 2020, Hub Group acquired NonstopDelivery, LLC (NSD) for $94.5 million. Founded in 2000, NSD’s delivery network includes over 170 agent locations, which enables service to all U.S. zip codes.

In 2021, Hub Group acquired Preston, MD-based Choptank Transport for $130 million cash-on-hand. Founded in 2003, Choptank has a carrier network of over 200,000 carriers who specialize in refrigerated and frozen transportation.

In 2022, Hub Group acquired TAGG Logistics for $103 million cash on hand. Founded in 2006, TAGG provides ECommerce and Omnichannel fulfillment with over 23 fulfillment locations.

In November 2022, David Yeager announced his retirement and his son, Phillip Yeager was announced as the new CEO beginning January 1, 2023.
