= United States Department of Transportation =

Federal executive department

- Seal of the USDOT

- Flag of the USDOT

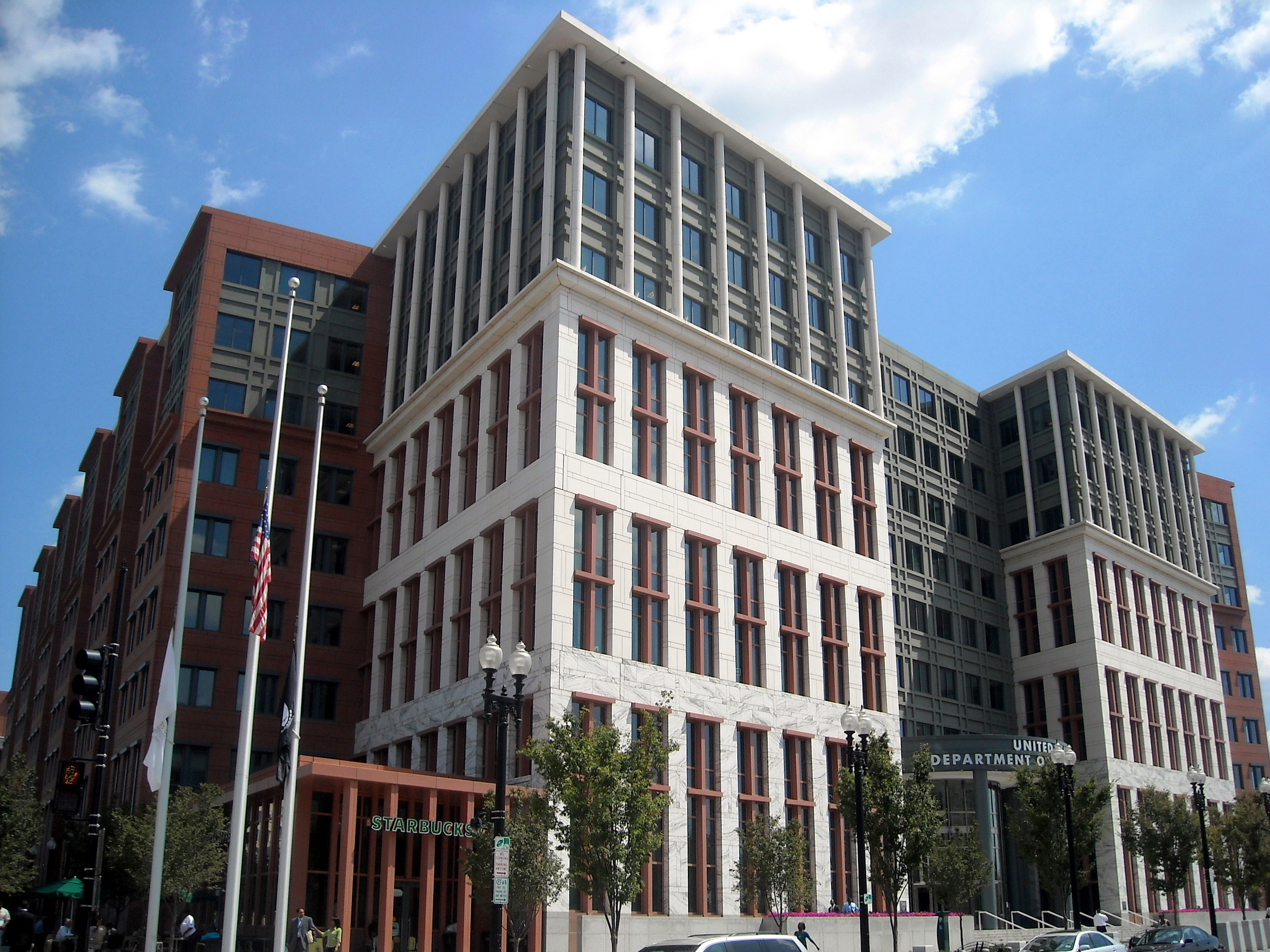
- Headquarters of the U.S. Department of Transportation

Department overview
- Formed: April 1, 1967; 59 years ago
- Jurisdiction: U.S. federal government
- Headquarters: 1200 New Jersey Avenue SE, Washington, D.C.; 38°52′32.92″N 77°0′10.26″W
- Employees: 58,622
- Annual budget: US$87.6 billion (FY2021, enacted)
- Secretary responsible: Sean Duffy
- Deputy Secretary responsible: Steven G. Bradbury
- Child agencies: Federal Aviation Administration; Federal Highway Administration; Federal Railroad Administration; Federal Transit Administration; Maritime Administration; Additional agencies
- Key document: Department of Transportation Act
- Website: transportation.gov

The seal of the U.S. Department of Transportation before 1980

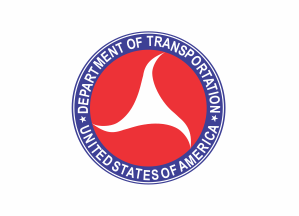
The flag of the U.S. Department of Transportation before 1980

The United States Department of Transportation (USDOT or DOT) is one of the executive departments of the U.S. federal government. It is headed by the secretary of transportation, who reports directly to the president of the United States and is a member of the president's Cabinet.

The department's fiscal year 2022–2026 strategic plan states that its mission is "to deliver the world's leading transportation system, serving the American people and economy through the safe, efficient, sustainable, and equitable movement of people and goods."

== History ==
In 1965, Najeeb Halaby, the chief of the independent Federal Aviation Agency strongly urged President Lyndon Johnson to set up a cabinet-level Department of Transportation. Halaby proposed merging the responsibilities of the undersecretary of commerce for transportation and the Federal Aviation Agency to achieve this goal. While the federal government was granted authority over aviation and railroads through the commerce clause of the Constitution, the Federal Highway Administration and Federal Transit Administration primarily provided funding for state and local projects, without significant influence over road construction and operation. Halaby emphasized the need for improved coordination and expressed frustration at the lack of an overall plan. "One looks in vain", he told Johnson, "for a point of responsibility below the President capable of taking an evenhanded, comprehensive, authoritarian approach to the development of transportation policies or even able to assure reasonable coordination and balance among the various transportation programs of the government." Johnson convinced Congress to act and The Department of Transportation was authorized in October 1966 and launched on 1 April 1967, with a mission to ensure that federal funds were effectively used to support the national transportation program. Johnson proclaimed upon signing the act: "Transportation has truly emerged as a significant part of our national life. As a basic force in our society, its progress must be accelerated so that the quality of our life can be improved."

== Agencies ==
- Advanced Research Projects Agency–Infrastructure (ARPA-I)
- Federal Aviation Administration (FAA)
- Federal Highway Administration (FHWA)
- Federal Motor Carrier Safety Administration (FMCSA)
- Federal Railroad Administration (FRA)
- Federal Transit Administration (FTA)
- Great Lakes St. Lawrence Seaway Development Corporation (GLS)
- Maritime Administration (MARAD)
- National Highway Traffic Safety Administration (NHTSA)
- Office of Inspector General (OIG)
- Office of the Secretary of Transportation (OST)，which includes the agencies below, among others：
  - John A. Volpe National Transportation Systems Center
  - Bureau of Transportation Statistics (BTS)
- Pipeline and Hazardous Materials Safety Administration (PHMSA)

== Former agencies ==
- Transportation Security Administration – transferred to Department of Homeland Security in 2003
- United States Coast Guard – transferred to Department of Homeland Security in 2003
- Surface Transportation Board (STB) – spun off as an independent federal agency in 2015
- Research and Innovative Technology Administration (RITA) - dissolved on December 4, 2015, via the Fixing America's Surface Transportation (FAST) Act on December 4, 2015

== Budget ==
In 2012, the DOT awarded $742.5 million in funds from the American Recovery and Reinvestment Act to 11 transit projects. The awardees include light rail projects. Other projects include both a commuter rail extension and a subway project in New York City, and a bus rapid transit system in Springfield, Oregon. The funds subsidize a heavy rail project in northern Virginia, completing the Washington Metropolitan Area Transit Authority's Metro Silver Line to connect Washington, D.C., and the Washington Dulles International Airport (DOT had previously agreed to subsidize the Silver Line construction to Reston, Virginia).

President Barack Obama's budget request for 2010 also included $1.83 billion in funding for major transit projects. More than $600 million went towards ten new or expanding transit projects. The budget provided additional funding for all of the projects currently receiving Recovery Act funding, except for the bus rapid transit project. It also continued funding for another 18 transit projects that are either currently under construction or soon will be. Following the same, the Consolidated Appropriations Act of 2014 delegated $600 million for Infrastructure Investments, referred to as Discretionary Grants.

The Department of Transportation was authorized a budget for Fiscal Year 2016 of $75.1 billion. The budget authorization is broken down as follows:

Agency / Office	Funding (in millions)	Employees (FTE)
Federal Aviation Administration	$16,280.7	45,988
Federal Highway Administration	$43,049.7	2,782
Federal Motor Carrier Safety Administration	$580.4	1,175
National Highway Traffic Safety Administration	$869.0	639
Federal Transit Administration	$11,782.6	585
Federal Railroad Administration	$1,699.2	934
Pipelines and Hazardous Materials Safety Administration	$249.6	575
Maritime Administration	$399.3	835
Saint Lawrence Seaway Development Corporation	$28.4	144
Office of the Secretary	$935.4	1,284
Office of the Inspector General	$87.5	413
TOTAL	$75,536.1	55,739

In 2021, President Joe Biden signed the Infrastructure Investment and Jobs Act. The $1.2 trillion act included over $660 billion in funding for transportation-related infrastructure projects over the five-year period of fiscal years 2022–2026.

== Related legislation ==
- 1806 – Cumberland Road
- 1862 – Pacific Railway Act
- 1887 – Interstate Commerce Act
- 1916 – Adamson Railway Labor Act
- 1935 – Motor Carrier Act
- 1946 – Federal Airport Act, Pub. L. 79–377, 60 Stat. 170
- 1950 – Federal Aid to Highway, Pub. L. 81–769, 64 Stat. 785
- 1954 – Saint Lawrence Seaway Act
- 1956 – Federal-Aid to Highway/Interstate Highway Act, Pub. L. 84–627, 70 Stat. 374
- 1957 – Airways Modernization Act, Pub. L. 85–133, 71 Stat. 349
- 1958 – Transportation Act of 1958, Pub. L. 85–625, 72 Stat. 568
- 1958 – Federal Aviation Act, Pub. L. 85–726, 72 Stat. 731
- 1959 – Airport Construction Act, Pub. L. 86–72, 73 Stat. 155
- 1964 – Urban Mass Transportation Act, Pub. L. 88–365
- 1965 – Highway Beautification Act, Pub. L. 89–285, 79 Stat. 1028
- 1966 – Department of Transportation established, Pub. L. 89–670, 80 Stat. 931
- 1970 – Urban Mass Transportation Act, Pub. L. 91–453, 84 Stat. 962
- 1970 – Rail Passenger Service Act PL 91–518
- 1970 – Airport and Airway Development Act PL 91–258
- 1973 – Federal Aid Highway Act PL 93–87
- 1973 – Amtrak Improvement Act PL 93–146
- 1974 – National Mass Transportation Assistance Act PL 93–503
- 1976 – Railroad Revitalization and Regulatory Reform Act PL 94–210
- 1976 – Hart-Scott-Rodino Antitrust Improvements Act PL 94–435
- 1978 – Airline Deregulation Act PL 95–504
- 1980 – Motor Carrier Act PL 96–296
- 1980 – Staggers Rail Act PL 96–448
- 1982 – Surface Transportation Assistance Act of 1982 PL 97–424
- 1982 – Bus Regulatory Reform Act PL 97–261
- 1984 – Commercial Space Launch Act PL 98–575
- 1987 – Surface Transportation Act PL 100–17
- 1991 – Intermodal Surface Transportation Efficiency Act PL 102–240
- 1998 – Transportation Equity Act for the 21st Century PL 105–178
- 2000 – Wendell H. Ford Aviation Investment and Reform Act for the 21st Century PL 106–181
- 2001 – Aviation and Transportation Security Act (PL 107-71)
- 2002 – Homeland Security Act (PL 107-296)
- 2005 – Safe, Accountable, Flexible, Efficient Transportation Equity Act: A Legacy for Users (PL 109-59)
- 2012 – Moving Ahead for Progress in the 21st Century Act (MAP-21) PL 112–141
- 2015 – Fixing America's Surface Transportation Act (FAST Act) PL 114–94
- 2021 - Infrastructure Investment and Jobs Act PL 117-58

== Freedom of Information Act processing performance ==
In the latest Center for Effective Government analysis of 15 federal agencies which receive the most Freedom of Information Act (FOIA) requests, published in 2015 (using 2012 and 2013 data, the most recent years available), the Department of Transportation earned a D by scoring 65 out of a possible 100 points.

== See also ==
- American Highway Users Alliance
- National Highway System (United States)
- National Transportation Safety Board
- Passenger vehicles in the United States
- Port Authority – Type of organization responsible for ports
- Title 23 of the Code of Federal Regulations
- Transportation in the United States
- Transportation policy of the United States
- Turner-Fairbank Highway Research Center
- United States Federal Maritime Commission
- United States Secretary of Transportation
