= Transportation bill =

In the United States, the federal transportation bill refers to any of a number of multi-year funding bills for surface transportation programs. These have included:

- Surface Transportation and Uniform Relocation Assistance Act, 1987
- Intermodal Surface Transportation Efficiency Act (ISTEA), 1991
- The National Highway System Designation Act (NHS), 1995
- Transportation Equity Act for the 21st Century (TEA-21), 1998
- Safe, Accountable, Flexible, Efficient Transportation Equity Act: A Legacy for Users (SAFETEA-LU), 2005
- Moving Ahead for Progress in the 21st Century Act (MAP-21), 2012
- Fixing America’s Surface Transportation Act (FAST), 2015
- Infrastructure Investment and Jobs Act, 2021

Previous multi-year highway spending bills were known as Federal-Aid Highway Acts.
