= Federal Bridge Gross Weight Formula =

Formula for estimating bridge weight limits

This diagram illustrates the difference in weight concentration between a short and long wheelbase truck. The shorter truck causes more wear and tear because all of its weight is concentrated in a smaller area.

The Federal Bridge Gross Weight Formula, also known as Bridge Formula B or the Federal Bridge Formula, is a mathematical formula in use in the United States by truck drivers and Department of Transportation (DOT) officials to determine the appropriate maximum gross weight for a commercial motor vehicle (CMV) based on axle number and spacing. The formula is part of federal weight and size regulations regarding interstate commercial traffic (intrastate traffic is subject to state limits). The formula is necessary to prevent heavy vehicles from damaging roads and bridges. CMVs are most often tractor-trailers or buses, but the formula is of most interest to truck drivers due to the heavy loads their vehicles often carry.

Early 20th-century weight limits were enacted to protect dirt and gravel roads from damage caused by the solid wheels of heavy trucks. As time passed, truck weight limits focused primarily on gross weight limits (which had no prescribed limits on length). By 1974, bridges received special protection from increasing truck weight limits. The bridge formula law was enacted by the U.S. Congress to limit the weight-to-length ratio of heavy trucks, and to protect roads and bridges from the damage caused by the concentrated weight of shorter trucks. The formula effectively lowers the legal weight limit for shorter trucks, preventing them from causing premature deterioration of bridges and highway infrastructure.

Compliance with the law is checked when vehicles pass through a weigh station, often located at the borders between states or on the outskirts of major cities, where the vehicle may be weighed and measured. The one exception to the formula allows a standard five-axle semi-truck configuration to weigh the maximum legal gross weight. This exception was specifically requested by the American Trucking Associations to allow tank trucks to reach the maximum legal gross weight without violating the bridge formula law.

== History ==
The first truck weight limits were enacted by four states in 1913, ranging from 18,000 pounds (8,200 kg) in Maine to 28,000 pounds (13,000 kg) in Massachusetts. These laws were passed to protect earth and gravel-surfaced roads from damage caused by the steel and solid rubber wheels of early heavy trucks. By 1933, all states had some form of truck weight regulation. The Federal-Aid Highway Act of 1956 instituted the first federal truck weight regulation (set at 73,280 pounds or 33,240 kilograms) and authorized the construction of the Interstate Highway System.

In the late 1950s, the American Association of State Highway and Transportation Officials (AASHTO) conducted a series of extensive field tests of roads and bridges to determine how traffic contributed to the deterioration of pavement materials. In 1964, the AASHTO recommended to Congress that a bridge formula table be used instead of a single gross weight limit for trucks. The Federal-Aid Highway Act Amendments of 1974 established the bridge formula as law, along with the gross weight limit of 80,000 pounds (36,000 kg). Current applications of the formula allow for up to 7 axles and 86 feet or more length between axle sets, and a maximum load of 105,500 lbs.

== Usage ==
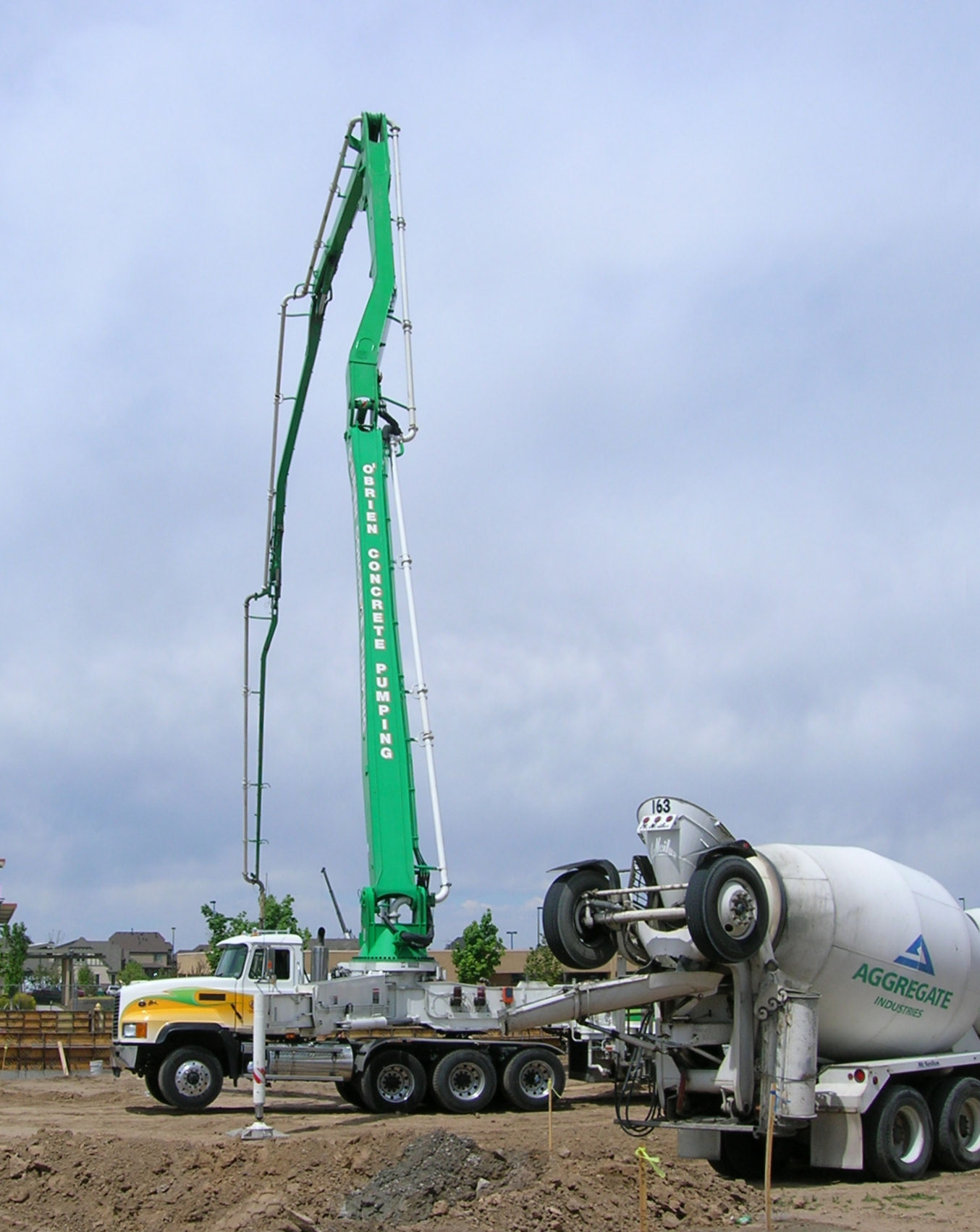
The back of the concrete mixer truck carries a 'booster axle', which can be lowered to extend the wheelbase of a fully loaded truck to comply with regulations.

The formula was enacted as law to limit the weight-to-length ratio of a commercial motor vehicle (CMV). The formula is necessary to prevent the concentrated truck's axles from overstressing pavements and bridge members (possibly causing a bridge collapse). In simplified form, this is analogous to a person walking on thin ice. When standing upright, a person's weight is concentrated at the bottom of their feet, funneling all of their weight into a small area. When lying down, a person's weight is distributed over a much larger area. This difference in weight distribution would allow a person to cross an area of ice while crawling that might otherwise collapse under their body weight while standing up. For an overweight truck to comply with the formula, more axles must be added, the distance between axles must be increased, or weight must be removed.

While the Federal Motor Carrier Safety Administration (FMCSA), regulates safety for the U.S. trucking industry., the Federal Highway Administration (FHWA) oversees the State enforcement of truck the size and weight Federal limits set by Congress for the Federal Aid System as described in 23 CFR 658. The Federal size limits apply in all States to the National Network (NN) which is a network of Interstate Highways, U.S. Highways, and state highways. Provided the truck remains on the NN, in all States and a truck is not subject to State size limits. In a similar fashion, the Federal weight limits and the Federal Bridge Formula apply to the Interstate System in all States. The State truck size and weight regulations apply to the Federal Aid System routes that do not have Federal limits.

The weight and size of CMVs are restricted for practical and safety reasons. CMVs are restricted by gross weight (total weight of vehicle and cargo), and by axle weight (i.e., the weight carried by each tire). The federal weight limits for CMVs are 80,000 pounds (36,000 kg) for gross weight (unless the bridge formula dictates a lower limit), 34,000 pounds (15,000 kg) for a tandem axle, and 20,000 pounds (9,100 kg) for a single axle. A tandem axle is defined as two or more consecutive axles whose centers are spaced more than 40 inches (102 cm) but not more than 96 inches (244 cm) apart. Axles spaced less than 40 inches (102 cm) apart are considered a single axle.

In effect, the formula reduces the legal weight limit for shorter trucks with fewer axles (see table below). For example, a 25-foot (7.6 m) three-axle dump truck would have a gross weight limit of 54,500 pounds (24,700 kg), instead of 80,000 pounds (36,000 kg), which is the standard weight limit for 63-foot (19.2 m) five-axle tractor-trailer. FHWA regulation §658.17 states: "The maximum gross vehicle weight shall be 80,000 pounds (36,000 kg) except where lower gross vehicle weight is dictated by the bridge formula."

== Bridge collapse ==
A bridge weight limit sign that drivers must heed before crossing a bridge in Ohio. The weight limit increases with the number of axles for single-unit trucks. The weights are in short tons.

The August 2007 collapse of the Interstate 35W Mississippi River bridge in Minneapolis brought renewed attention to the issue of truck weights and their relation to bridge stress. In November 2008, the National Transportation Safety Board determined there had been several reasons for the bridge's collapse, including (but not limited to): faulty gusset plates, inadequate inspections, and the extra weight of heavy construction equipment combined with the weight of rush hour traffic. The I-35 Trade Corridor Study reported that the Federal Highway Administration (FHWA) expressed concern over bridges on the I-35 corridor due to an expected increase of international truck traffic from Canada and Mexico, with the FHWA listing it as "high-priority" in 2005.

As of 2007, federal estimates suggest truck traffic increased 216% since 1970, shortly before the federal gross weight limit for trucks was increased by 30,000 pounds (14,000 kg). This is also the period during which many of the existing interstate bridges were built. Research shows that increased truck traffic (and therefore, increased stress) shortens the life of bridges. National Pavement Cost Model (NAPCOM) estimates indicate that one 80,000-pound (36,000 kg) truck does as much damage to roads as 750 3,800-pound (1,700 kg) cars.

Some smaller bridges have a weight limit (or gross weight load rating) indicated by a posted sign (hence the reference to a "posted bridge"). These are necessary when the weight limit of the bridge is lower than the federal or state gross weight limit for trucks. Driving a truck over a bridge that is too weak to support it usually does not result in an immediate collapse. The bridge may develop cracks, which over time can weaken the bridge and cause it to collapse. Most of these cracks are discovered during mandated inspections of bridges. Most bridge collapses occur in rural areas, result in few injuries or deaths, and receive relatively little media attention. While the number varies from year to year, as many as 150 bridges can collapse in a year. About 1,500 bridges collapsed between 1966 and 2007, and most of those were the result of soil erosion around bridge supports. In 1987, the Schoharie Creek Bridge collapsed in upstate New York, due to erosion of soil around the foundation, which sparked renewed interest in bridge design in inspection procedures.

In special cases involving unusually overweight trucks (which require special permits), not observing a bridge weight limit can lead to disastrous consequences. Fifteen days after the collapse of the Minneapolis bridge, a heavy truck collapsed a small bridge in Oakville, Washington.

== Formula law ==
CMVs are required to pass through weigh stations at the borders of most states and some large cities. These weigh stations are run by state DOTs, and CMV weight and size enforcement is overseen by the FHWA. Weigh stations check each vehicle's gross weight and axle weight using a set of in-ground truck scales, and are usually where a truck's compliance with the formula is checked.

Truck axle groups are used to calculate compliance with the formula. Any two axles must comply with the results of the formula, but axle groups 1–5, 1–3, and 2–5 are most critical. This truck is not in violation of the formula.

FMCSA regulation §658.17 states:

- No vehicle or combination of vehicles shall be moved or operated on any interstate highway when the gross weight on two or more consecutive axles exceeds the limitations prescribed by the following formula:

$$W = 500 \left ( \frac{LN}{N-1} + 12N + 36 \right )$$

- W = the maximum weight in pounds that can be carried on a group of two or more axles to the nearest 500 pounds (230 kg).
- L = spacing in feet between the center of the outer axles of any two or more consecutive axles.
- N = number of axles being considered.

Two or more consecutive axles may not exceed the weight computed by the bridge formula, even the gross weight of the truck. This means that the "outer group" or axles 1-5 which comprises the entire Gross Vehicle Weight (GVW) of truck and all interior combination of axles must also comply with the bridge formula. State may not issue less than four citations when a truck violate each of the Federal weight limits on the Interstate System which are: 1) Single axle 2) Tandem axle, 3) Gross Vehicle Weight (GVW), 4) Inner Group.

Penalties for violating weight limits vary between states (bridge formula weight violations are treated as gross weight violations), as the states are responsible for enforcement and collection of fines. Some states, such as Connecticut, issue fines on a percentage basis (e.g. 20% overweight at $10 per 100 pounds or 45 kilograms), which means larger trucks pay higher fines. For example, a truck with a legal gross limit of 20,000 pounds (9,100 kg) that violates the limit by 5,000 pounds (2,300 kg) would pay a fine of $500, while a truck with a legal gross limit of 60,000 pounds (27,000 kg) that violates the limit by 5,000 pounds would pay a fine of $250. Other states, such as New York, issue fines on a per-pound basis (e.g., 5,000 pounds overweight equals a $300 fine). Others, such as Massachusetts, impose a less complicated fine schedule whereby a vehicle that violates the limits by less than 10,000 pounds (4,500 kg) is fined $40 per 1,000 pounds (450 kg), while a violation over 10,000 pounds (4,500 kg) pays $80 per 1,000 pounds (450 kg) (e.g. 5,000 pounds or 2,300 kilograms overweight equals a $200 fine).

Some states require overweight trucks to offload enough cargo to comply with the limits. In Florida, any vehicle that exceeds the limits by more than 6,000 pounds (2,700 kg) is required to be unloaded until the vehicle is in compliance. Florida also includes a scale tolerance, which allows for violations of less than 10% to be forgiven, and no fine issued. Florida also allows for a load to be shifted (e.g., moved from the front towards the rear of the vehicle) for the vehicle to comply with axle weight limits, without penalty.

== Exception ==
There is one exception to the formula: two consecutive sets of tandem axles may carry 34,000 pounds (15,000 kg) each if the overall distance between the first and last axles of these tandems is 36 feet (11 m) or more. For example, a five-axle truck may carry 34,000 pounds both on the tractor tandem axles (2 and 3) and the trailer tandem axles (4 and 5), provided axles 2 and 5 are spaced at least 36 feet (11 m) apart.

This exception allows for the standard 5-axle semi-truck configuration to gross up to 80,000 pounds (36,000 kg) (the legal limit) without being in violation of the bridge formula law. Without it, the bridge formula would allow an actual weight of only 66,000 pounds (30,000 kg) to 67,500 pounds (30,600 kg) on tandems spaced 36 feet (11 m) to 38 feet (11.6 m) apart; compared to 68,000 pounds (31,000 kg) with the exception. This exception was sought by the American Trucking Associations so trucking companies could use 40-foot (12.2 m) trailers and weigh 80,000 pounds (36,000 kg). It was the only way tank truck operators could reach 80,000 pounds without adding axles to their fleets of trailers already in operation.

A CMV may exceed the bridge formula limits (or gross weight and its axle weight limits) by up to 550 pounds (249 kg) if the vehicle is equipped with an auxiliary power unit (APU) or idle reduction technology. This is permitted "in order to promote reduction of fuel use and emissions because of engine idling". To be eligible, the vehicle's operator must prove the weight of the APU with written certification, or—by demonstration or certification—that the idle reduction technology is fully functional at all times. Certification of the APU's weight must be available to law enforcement officers if the vehicle is found in violation of applicable weight laws. The additional weight allowed cannot exceed 550 pounds or the weight certified, whichever is less.

== Issues ==
The bridge formula (also referred to as Formula B) is based on research into single-span bridges, and fails to consider multiple-span bridges. Two-span bridges may not be fully protected by Formula B, depending on the truck length, span length, and other factors. Shorter wheelbase vehicles (usually specialized trucks such as garbage trucks and water trucks) have trouble complying with Formula B.

In 1987, the U.S. Congress passed the Surface Transportation and Uniform Relocation Assistance Act, requesting the Transportation Research Board (TRB) to conduct a study to develop alternatives to Formula B. The study recommended several that were never implemented. It suggested that Formula B was too strict for trucks with shorter axle lengths. One of the alternative formulas (later known as the TTI HS-20 Bridge Formula) was developed in conjunction with the Texas Transportation Institute. TTI HS-20 allowed shorter trucks to have higher weight limits than Formula B. For a 3-axle truck with an axle length of 14 feet (4.3 m), the weight limit increased from 46,500 pounds (21,100 kg) to 54,000 pounds (24,000 kg). TTI HS-20 also failed to address the problem of multiple-span bridges.

Distance in feet between any group of two or more axles ^{1}	Gross weight in pounds (kilograms) ^{2}
Distance in feet between any group of two or more axles ^{1}	2 axles	3 axles	4 axles	5 axles	6 axles	7 axles
Less than 8 ^{3}	34,000 lb (15,422 kg)	34,000 lb (15,422 kg)
More than 8 ^{4}	38,000 lb (17,237 kg)	42,000 lb (19,051 kg)
9	39,000 lb (17,690 kg)	42,500 lb (19,278 kg)
10	40,000 lb (18,144 kg)^{5}	43,500 lb (19,731 kg)
11	40,000 lb (18,144 kg)	44,000 lb (19,958 kg)
12	40,000 lb (18,144 kg)	45,000 lb (20,412 kg)	50,000 lb (22,680 kg)
13	40,000 lb (18,144 kg)	45,000 lb (20,412 kg)	50,500 lb (22,906 kg)
14	40,000 lb (18,144 kg)	46,500 lb (21,092 kg)	51,500 lb (23,360 kg)
15	40,000 lb (18,144 kg)	47,000 lb (21,319 kg)	52,000 lb (23,587 kg)
16	40,000 lb (18,144 kg)	48,000 lb (21,772 kg)	52,500 lb (23,814 kg)	58,000 lb (26,308 kg)
17	40,000 lb (18,144 kg)	48,500 lb (21,999 kg)	53,500 lb (24,267 kg)	58,500 lb (26,535 kg)
18	40,000 lb (18,144 kg)	49,500 lb (22,453 kg)	54,000 lb (24,494 kg)	59,000 lb (26,762 kg)
19	40,000 lb (18,144 kg)	50,500 lb (22,906 kg)	54,500 lb (24,721 kg)	60,000 lb (27,216 kg)
20	40,000 lb (18,144 kg)	51,000 lb (23,133 kg)	55,500 lb (25,174 kg)	60,500 lb (27,442 kg)	66,000 lb (29,937 kg)
21	40,000 lb (18,144 kg)	51,500 lb (23,360 kg)	56,000 lb (25,401 kg)	61,000 lb (27,669 kg)	66,500 lb (30,164 kg)
22	40,000 lb (18,144 kg)	52,500 lb (23,814 kg)	56,500 lb (25,628 kg)	61,500 lb (27,896 kg)	67,000 lb (30,391 kg)
23	40,000 lb (18,144 kg)	53,000 lb (24,040 kg)	57,500 lb (26,082 kg)	62,500 lb (28,350 kg)	68,000 lb (30,844 kg)
24	40,000 lb (18,144 kg)	54,000 lb (24,494 kg)	58,000 lb (26,308 kg)	63,000 lb (28,576 kg)	68,500 lb (31,071 kg)	74,000 lb (33,566 kg)
25	40,000 lb (18,144 kg)	54,500 lb (24,721 kg)	58,500 lb (26,535 kg)	63,500 lb (28,803 kg)	69,000 lb (31,298 kg)	74,500 lb (33,793 kg)
26	40,000 lb (18,144 kg)	55,500 lb (25,174 kg)	59,500 lb (26,989 kg)	64,000 lb (29,030 kg)	69,500 lb (31,525 kg)	75,000 lb (34,019 kg)
27	40,000 lb (18,144 kg)	56,000 lb (25,401 kg)	60,000 lb (27,216 kg)	65,000 lb (29,484 kg)	70,000 lb (31,751 kg)	75,500 lb (34,246 kg)
28	40,000 lb (18,144 kg)	57,000 lb (25,855 kg)	60,500 lb (27,442 kg)	65,500 lb (29,710 kg)	71,000 lb (32,205 kg)	76,500 lb (34,700 kg)
29	40,000 lb (18,144 kg)	57,500 lb (26,082 kg)	61,500 lb (27,896 kg)	66,000 lb (29,937 kg)	71,500 lb (32,432 kg)	77,000 lb (34,927 kg)
30	40,000 lb (18,144 kg)	58,500 lb (26,535 kg)	62,000 lb (28,123 kg)	66,500 lb (30,164 kg)	72,000 lb (32,659 kg)	77,500 lb (35,153 kg)
31	40,000 lb (18,144 kg)	59,000 lb (26,762 kg)	62,500 lb (28,350 kg)	67,500 lb (30,617 kg)	72,500 lb (32,885 kg)	78,000 lb (35,380 kg)
32	40,000 lb (18,144 kg)	60,000 lb (27,216 kg)^{5}	63,500 lb (28,803 kg)	68,000 lb (30,844 kg)	73,000 lb (33,112 kg)	78,500 lb (35,607 kg)
33	40,000 lb (18,144 kg)	60,000 lb (27,216 kg)	64,000 lb (29,030 kg)	68,500 lb (31,071 kg)	74,000 lb (33,566 kg)	79,000 lb (35,834 kg)
34	40,000 lb (18,144 kg)	60,000 lb (27,216 kg)	64,500 lb (29,257 kg)	69,000 lb (31,298 kg)	74,500 lb (33,793 kg)	80,000 lb (36,287 kg)^{5}
35	40,000 lb (18,144 kg)	60,000 lb (27,216 kg)	65,500 lb (29,710 kg)	70,000 lb (31,751 kg)	75,000 lb (34,019 kg)	80,000 lb (36,287 kg)
36	40,000 lb (18,144 kg)	60,000 lb (27,216 kg)	66,000 lb (29,937 kg)^{6}	70,500 lb (31,978 kg)	75,500 lb (34,246 kg)	80,000 lb (36,287 kg)
37	40,000 lb (18,144 kg)	60,000 lb (27,216 kg)	66,500 lb (30,164 kg)^{6}	71,000 lb (32,205 kg)	76,000 lb (34,473 kg)	80,000 lb (36,287 kg)
38	40,000 lb (18,144 kg)	60,000 lb (27,216 kg)	67,500 lb (30,617 kg)^{6}	71,500 lb (32,432 kg)	77,000 lb (34,927 kg)	80,000 lb (36,287 kg)
39	40,000 lb (18,144 kg)	60,000 lb (27,216 kg)	68,000 lb (30,844 kg)	72,500 lb (32,885 kg)	77,500 lb (35,153 kg)	80,000 lb (36,287 kg)
40	40,000 lb (18,144 kg)	60,000 lb (27,216 kg)	68,500 lb (31,071 kg)	73,000 lb (33,112 kg)	78,000 lb (35,380 kg)	80,000 lb (36,287 kg)
41	40,000 lb (18,144 kg)	60,000 lb (27,216 kg)	69,500 lb (31,525 kg)	73,500 lb (33,339 kg)	78,500 lb (35,607 kg)	80,000 lb (36,287 kg)
42	40,000 lb (18,144 kg)	60,000 lb (27,216 kg)	70,000 lb (31,751 kg)	74,000 lb (33,566 kg)	79,000 lb (35,834 kg)	80,000 lb (36,287 kg)
43	40,000 lb (18,144 kg)	60,000 lb (27,216 kg)	70,500 lb (31,978 kg)	75,000 lb (34,019 kg)	80,000 lb (36,287 kg)^{5}	80,000 lb (36,287 kg)
44	40,000 lb (18,144 kg)	60,000 lb (27,216 kg)	71,500 lb (32,432 kg)	75,500 lb (34,246 kg)	80,000 lb (36,287 kg)	80,000 lb (36,287 kg)
45	40,000 lb (18,144 kg)	60,000 lb (27,216 kg)	72,000 lb (32,659 kg)	76,000 lb (34,473 kg)	80,000 lb (36,287 kg)	80,000 lb (36,287 kg)
46	40,000 lb (18,144 kg)	60,000 lb (27,216 kg)	72,500 lb (32,885 kg)	76,500 lb (34,700 kg)	80,000 lb (36,287 kg)	80,000 lb (36,287 kg)
47	40,000 lb (18,144 kg)	60,000 lb (27,216 kg)	73,500 lb (33,339 kg)	77,500 lb (35,153 kg)	80,000 lb (36,287 kg)	80,000 lb (36,287 kg)
48	40,000 lb (18,144 kg)	60,000 lb (27,216 kg)	74,000 lb (33,566 kg)	78,000 lb (35,380 kg)	80,000 lb (36,287 kg)	80,000 lb (36,287 kg)
49	40,000 lb (18,144 kg)	60,000 lb (27,216 kg)	74,500 lb (33,793 kg)	78,500 lb (35,607 kg)	80,000 lb (36,287 kg)	80,000 lb (36,287 kg)
50	40,000 lb (18,144 kg)	60,000 lb (27,216 kg)	75,500 lb (34,246 kg)	79,000 lb (35,834 kg)	80,000 lb (36,287 kg)	80,000 lb (36,287 kg)
51	40,000 lb (18,144 kg)	60,000 lb (27,216 kg)	76,000 lb (34,473 kg)	80,000 lb (36,287 kg)^{5}	80,000 lb (36,287 kg)	80,000 lb (36,287 kg)
52	40,000 lb (18,144 kg)	60,000 lb (27,216 kg)	76,500 lb (34,700 kg)	80,000 lb (36,287 kg)	80,000 lb (36,287 kg)	80,000 lb (36,287 kg)
53	40,000 lb (18,144 kg)	60,000 lb (27,216 kg)	77,500 lb (35,153 kg)	80,000 lb (36,287 kg)	80,000 lb (36,287 kg)	80,000 lb (36,287 kg)
54	40,000 lb (18,144 kg)	60,000 lb (27,216 kg)	78,000 lb (35,380 kg)	80,000 lb (36,287 kg)	80,000 lb (36,287 kg)	80,000 lb (36,287 kg)
55	40,000 lb (18,144 kg)	60,000 lb (27,216 kg)	78,500 lb (35,607 kg)	80,000 lb (36,287 kg)	80,000 lb (36,287 kg)	80,000 lb (36,287 kg)
56	40,000 lb (18,144 kg)	60,000 lb (27,216 kg)	79,500 lb (36,061 kg)	80,000 lb (36,287 kg)	80,000 lb (36,287 kg)	80,000 lb (36,287 kg)
57	40,000 lb (18,144 kg)	60,000 lb (27,216 kg)	80,000 lb (36,287 kg)^{5}	80,000 lb (36,287 kg)	80,000 lb (36,287 kg)	80,000 lb (36,287 kg)

- ^{1} Calculated values reflect FHWA policy of rounding down when distances fall exactly between 6-inch (15.24 cm) increments.
- ^{2} Calculated values reflect FHWA policy of rounding down when weights fall exactly between 500-pound (227 kg) increments.
- ^{3} Tandem axle by definition.
- ^{4} Distances between 8 feet (2.44 m) to 8 feet 11 inches (2.72 m) may not be rounded down.
- ^{5} __ Maximum legal weight limit based on number of axles. Increased axle lengths beyond these do not increase maximum legal weight.
- ^{6} __ Exception to the formula: when the four axles under consideration are two tandem axles spaced at least 36 feet (10.97 m) apart, a gross weight of 68,000 pounds (30,844 kg) is allowed.
- __ Upper blank areas represent unrealistic configurations.

== See also ==
- Long combination vehicle
- Dolly (trailer)
