= Federal-Aid Highway Act =

The following bills in the United States have been known as the Federal-Aid Highway Act or similar names since their initial adoption in 1916. The initial adoption established Congress to authorize and provide federal funding for constructing roads. There have been various amendments to the Federal-Aid Highway Act.

Since 1978, Congress has passed highway authorization legislation as part of larger, more comprehensive, multi-year surface transportation acts, which include federal-aid transit funding and federal-aid highway programs.

== List of Federal-Aid Highway Acts ==
Name of act and/or amendment	Date adopted	Statutes at Large citation	Public Law citation
Federal Aid Road Act of 1916	July 11, 1916	39 Stat. 355	Pub. L. 64–156
Federal Aid Highway Act of 1921 (Phipps Act)	November 9, 1921	42 Stat. 212	Pub. L. 67–87
Amendment and Authorization of 1925	February 12, 1925	43 Stat. 889	Pub. L. 68–407
Amendment and Authorization of 1926	June 22, 1926	44 Stat. 760	Pub. L. 69–411
Federal Aid for Toll Bridges	March 3, 1927	44 Stat. 1398	Pub. L. 69–774
Amendment of 1928	May 21, 1928	45 Stat. 683	Pub. L. 70–458
Authorization for Forest Roads and Amendment of 1930	May 5, 1930	46 Stat. 261	Pub. L. 71–180
Provision for National-Park Approaches	January 31, 1931	46 Stat. 1053	Pub. L. 71–592
Hayden-Cartwright Act of 1934	June 18, 1934	48 Stat. 993	Pub. L. 73–393
Authorization and Amendment of 1936	June 16, 1936	49 Stat. 1519	Pub. L. 74–686
Federal Aid Highway Act of 1938	June 16, 1936	49 Stat. 1519	Pub. L. 74–686
Federal-Aid Highway Act of 1944	December 20, 1944	58 Stat. 838	Pub. L. 78–521
Federal-Aid Highway Act of 1948	June 29, 1948	62 Stat. 1105	Pub. L. 80–834
Federal-Aid Highway Act of 1950	September 7, 1950	64 Stat. 785	Pub. L. 81–769
Federal-Aid Highway Act of 1952	June 25, 1952	66 Stat. 158	Pub. L. 82–413
Federal-Aid Highway Act of 1954	May 6, 1954	68 Stat. 70	Pub. L. 83–350
Federal-Aid Highway Act of 1956 (National Interstate and Defense Highways Act)	June 29, 1956	70 Stat. 374	Pub. L. 84–627
Federal-Aid Highway Act of 1958	August 7, 1958	72 Stat. 89	Pub. L. 85–381
Federal-Aid Highway Act of 1959	September 21, 1959	73 Stat. 611	Pub. L. 86–342
Federal Highway Act of 1960	July 14, 1960	74 Stat. 522	Pub. L. 86–657
Federal-Aid Highway Act of 1961	June 29, 1961	75 Stat. 122	Pub. L. 87–61
Federal-Aid Highway Act of 1962	October 23, 1962	76 Stat. 1145	Pub. L. 87–866
Federal-Aid Highway Amendments Act of 1963	October 24, 1963	77 Stat. 276	Pub. L. 88–157
Federal-Aid Highway Act of 1964	August 13, 1964	78 Stat. 397	Pub. L. 88–423
Joint Resolution of 1965	August 28, 1965	79 Stat. 578	Pub. L. 89–139
Federal-Aid Highway Act of 1966	September 13, 1966	80 Stat. 766	Pub. L. 89–574
Federal-Aid Highway Act of 1968	August 23, 1968	82 Stat. 815	Pub. L. 90–495
Federal-Aid Highway Act of 1970	December 31, 1970	84 Stat. 1713	Pub. L. 91–605
Federal-Aid Highway Act of 1973	August 13, 1973	87 Stat. 250	Pub. L. 93–87
Federal-Aid Highway Amendments of 1974	January 4, 1975	88 Stat. 2281	Pub. L. 93–643
Federal-Aid Highway Act of 1976	May 5, 1976	90 Stat. 425	Pub. L. 94–280
Federal-Aid Highway Act of 1978 (Title I of the Surface Transportation Assistance Act of 1978)	November 6, 1978	92 Stat. 2689	Pub. L. 95–599
Federal-Aid Highway Act of 1981	December 29, 1981	95 Stat. 1699	Pub. L. 97–134
Federal-Aid Highway Act of 1982	January 6, 1983	96 Stat. 1611	Pub. L. 97–424
Federal-Aid Highway Act of 1987 (Title I of the Surface Transportation and Uniform Relocation Assistance Act)	April 2, 1987	101 Stat. 132	Pub. L. 100–17

== See also ==
- Title 23 of the United States Code
- Transportation policy of the United States
