= Urban Mass Transportation Act =

Urban Mass Transportation Act may refer to:

- Urban Mass Transportation Act of 1964
- Urban Mass Transportation Act of 1970

Now it is called Federal Transit Act
