= Surface Transportation Assistance Act =

Surface Transportation Assistance Act may refer to:

- Surface Transportation Assistance Act of 1978, 92 Stat. 2689, the first federal act to combine authorizations for highways, highway safety, and public transportation in a single piece of legislation
- Surface Transportation Assistance Act of 1982, 96 Stat. 2097, which raised the federal gas tax, established national truck size and weight standards, and included whistleblower protections for commercial motor vehicle drivers

== See also ==
- Surface Transportation and Uniform Relocation Assistance Act of 1987
