= Interstate 66 (Kansas–Kentucky) =

Canceled highway in the United States

Future Interstate 66
- Proposed I-66 corridor highlighted in red

Route information
- Existed: 1991–2015
- History: Never built

Location
- Country: United States

Highway system
- Interstate Highway System; Main; Auxiliary; Suffixed; Business; Future

Interstate 66 (I-66) is a canceled Interstate Highway designated in the Intermodal Surface Transportation Efficiency Act (ISTEA) of 1991 as the East–West TransAmerica Corridor and High Priority Corridor 3.

== History and background ==
The proposal for the westward extension of I-66 was started by business interest in Wichita, Kansas. The choice for the number I-66 was a hope to capitalize on the name association with the decommissioned U.S. Route 66 (US 66). The Federal Highway Administration (FHWA) originally studied the extension of the existing I-66 in the original Trans America Transportation Corridor Feasibility Study published by Wilber Smith Associates on September 8, 1994. The first version of the Future I-66 Trans America Corridor started from its existing western terminus at I-81 near Middletown, Virginia, across the nation to California. One concept was to terminate near Fresno. Either way required expensive excavation and tunneling through the Rockies and the Sierra Nevadas to reach Fresno or through Death Valley National Park to reach Los Angeles. The route west of Kansas was not favored by any of the related state highway departments, and, as a result, I-66 west of Wichita, through New Mexico, Arizona, and California was canceled because of lack of interest from any of the state highway departments. Other considerations in the cancellation were the insufficient projected traffic versus the extreme expense of building through the widest and highest mountains in the nation did not justify an Interstate, especially since many segments had no preexisting highway to reduce environmental damage, and the possibility the route would traverse Death Valley National Park which the National Park Service immediately rejected.

Congress decided to create the East-West Trans America High Priority Corridor 3 in the Intermodal Surface Transportation Efficiency Act of 1991, shifting the route south from Washington, DC, to the Norfolk–Chesapeake area, continuing through West Virginia, Kentucky, Illinois, Missouri and terminating at I-35 in Wichita. The Virginia Department of Transportation (VDOT) studied the conversion of US 460 to an Interstate-standard freeway as part of the Trans America Corridor. As proponents wanted all of the Trans America Corridor designated as Future I-66, this required VDOT petition the American Association of State Highway and Transportation Officials (AASHTO) or Congress to decommission the existing I-66 in North Virginia, changing its designation to an unspecified Interstate number, and designating the conversion of US 460 to Future I-66. The Virginia state legislature was prepared to proceed with the Interstate-standard freeway conversion of US 460. VDOT rejected the conversion once the Trans America feasibility study concluded the nationwide highway was not economical, with little traffic benefit, and I-66 remained as it does today.

Congress limited the I-66 designation only to the section of the Trans America Corridor from the then planned I-73/I-74 conversion of the US 52 (King Coal Highway) in West Virginia, through Kentucky, Illinois, terminating at I-57 in Missouri. Future I-66 in West Virginia, Kentucky, Illinois, and Missouri would have remained disconnected from the existing I-66. The I-66 concept was supported in Kentucky mainly because of the efforts of Representative Hal Rogers; however, the Kentucky Transportation Cabinet (KYTC) completed its feasibility study in 2005 and concluded in 2005 that building I-66 was too costly, had little traffic benefit, had no eastern terminus because I-73/I-74 had little chance of completion in West Virginia, and high potential environmental impact in the Daniel Boone National Forest. KYTC made it a low priority wishlist project in the state transportation planning documents and state budget, effectively canceling the project in Kentucky. The only remaining study of I-66 was conducted by the FHWA, the Illinois Department of Transportation (IDOT) and KYTC under the name "66 Corridor", a Tier 1 environmental impact statement (EIS). This study was canceled on August 6, 2015, by IDOT, and subsequently, the FHWA announced the cancellation of the EIS in the Federal Register, ending the last I-66 project and therefore officially canceling the I-66 Trans America Highway.

Designating the Trans America Corridor as Future I-66 was more nostalgia than logical, a legal requirement for a highway to be included in the Interstate Highway System. Had the proposed Interstate designation been Future I-50 or Future I-60, VDOT would not have needed to change every highway sign on the existing I-66. Although current Federal law does not allow that the same number be used for an Interstate Route and a U.S. Route in the same state, in this case I-50 and US 50 or I-60 and US 60, Congress is free to designate the Interstate Highway with whatever number it wants by law, like it did with I-69 and US 69 in Texas. Business and local political interests in Cape Girardeau, Missouri, is the only public group still advocating the "I-66 Trans America Corridor", but there are no plans in the FHWA to fund their concept after the FHWA cancelled any further studies of I-66 in 2015. Congress has the option to revive the Trans America Corridor, following a less environmentally damaging route like US 50 through Kansas to I-70 in Grand Junction, Colorado, to provide an alternate freight corridor to I-70 connecting to the Chesapeake Bay ports in Virginia with higher traffic benefits, designated as Future I-50 or Future I-60 by law. In addition, AASHTO has the authority to decommission the same number from the U.S. Route, allowing an Interstate Highway to use the same number, as they did by decommissioning US 40 in Northern California to allow I-40 in Southern California.

== Route description ==
=== Kansas ===
I-66 was proposed to extend west from I-44 near Joplin, Missouri, to Wichita, Kansas.

=== Missouri ===
Missouri had several proposals to bring I-66 through the state:

1. Bringing I-66 from Kentucky through Illinois to Cape Girardeau, which required going through the Shawnee National Forest
2. Crossing the Mississippi River with a new bridge, then follow I-57 to Sikeston, where it would have followed US 60 westward to Springfield.

Sikeston would have been the convergence point of three Interstates, I-55 to St. Louis and Memphis, I-57 to Chicago, and I-66 to Kentucky, in addition to the considerable pieces of the US Numbered Highway System already present there, such as US 60, US 61, and US 62. The Missouri Department of Transportation did not plan to proceed with any part of I-66 when Illinois and Kentucky dropped their commitment to the project.

=== Illinois ===
On August 17, 2011, IDOT received $3.7 million (equivalent to $5.22 million in 2025) to conduct the 66 Corridor Study, a feasibility study that would investigate a route between Cape Girardeau on the Mississippi River and Paducah, Kentucky, on the Ohio River. The route would have utilized the existing I-24 bridge at Paducah and new four-lane bridge at Cape Girardeau. The 66 Corridor concept was heavily opposed in Illinois from farmers to environmentalists because the plan required that I-66 cross the Shawnee National Forest. The FHWA and IDOT canceled the 66 Corridor Study on July 9, 2015.

=== Kentucky ===
I-66 was planned to cross the Mississippi River east of Cape Girardeau, then continue east on a new alignment to I-24 north of Paducah. It would have followed I-24 east to Eddyville where it would have turned northeast following I-69 (Western Kentucky Parkway) to the William H. Natcher Parkway, then turn southeast following the Natcher Parkway to I-65 near Bowling Green. Former Governor Paul Patton had I-66 written into law in Kentucky, with the routing being confirmed along the Cumberland Parkway. That state-supported designation had been echoed at the federal level; the 2002 federal highway authorization act authorized a future Interstate between I-57 in southeast Missouri and the I-73/I-74 proposed corridor in West Virginia, a few miles east of the Kentucky state line. This route was controversial, however; opponents worried that the segment between London and Somerset, currently served by the two- to four-lane Kentucky Route 80 (KY 80) would risk damaging delicate karst formations and environmentally sensitive areas of the Daniel Boone National Forest. Between London and Hazard, I-66 would have paralleled or replaced the super-two Hal Rogers Parkway. The Interstate would have then turned northeast toward Pikeville and east to West Virginia. The KYTC finished its final I-66 feasibility study in 2005 and concluded that I-66 was not cost beneficial for the foreseeable future to justify its construction or any further study, thereby canceling Kentucky's participation in the I-66 project. Construction was completed in 2011, however, on a less controversial segment in western Pulaski County, relocating the eastern terminus of the Cumberland Parkway to US 27, making it the only part ever constructed for the Southern Kentucky Corridor as it had officially named by then.

The Audubon and Natcher parkways did remain as High Priority Interstate Corridors, referred to as the "Future Interstate Route 69 Spur" (presumptively I-369 for the Audubon Parkway; as I-169 has since been assigned to the Pennyrile Parkway between the I-69/WK Parkway interchange and I-24 near Hopkinsville) and the "Future Interstate Route 66 Spur" in the SAFETEA-LU Technical Corrections Act of 2008 which was signed into law on June 6, 2008. After I-66 was officially canceled in 2015, the designation of the Natcher Parkway was changed from an "I-66 spur" to an "I-65 spur" in the Fixing America's Surface Transportation Act (FAST Act) of 2015. Kentucky Governor Matt Bevin submitted his 2016 Recommended Highway Plan in January 2016 to the state legislature to have the I-65 spur designated as I-565 (although the number eventually approved by American Association of State Highway and Transportation Officials [AASHTO] in 2017 is I-165). A total of $66 million in construction funds are planned to convert the Natcher Parkway to Interstate standards between Bowling Green and Owensboro.

=== West Virginia ===
The western segment of I-66 was proposed to end at the I-73/I-74/US 52 (King Coal Highway) in West Virginia, a few miles east of the Kentucky state line. West Virginia never planned any direct connection between this termination of I-66 and I-73/I-74 to the existing I-66 in Virginia and the District of Columbia, which would have made I-66 a non-contiguous Interstate. Travel between the two segments of freeway would have been possible by following the Future I-73/I-74/US 52 southeast, then northeast along the Future US 121 (Coalfields Expressway) to Beckley, north along I-79, and east on the Future US 48 (Corridor H) of the Appalachian Development Highway System (ADHS).

=== Virginia ===
The final segment of the Trans America Corridor (not I-66 though) in Virginia followed US 460 from the West Virginia border to Norfolk. US 460 was widened in Virginia before the Trans America Corridor concept existed as a four-lane divided highway with some interchanges and freeway bypasses around many of the towns and cities along the route. The Virginia Department of Transportation never committed to any Interstate freeway through the Trans America Highway, especially with the I-66 designation that would have duplicated the existing I-66 in Northern Virginia, and probably would have required changing the northern I-66 to some other new Interstate number since I-66 was the designation established by Congress for the Trans America Corridor. Building a third east–west freeway in Virginia was also not a high priority given the existence of I-64 to the Norfolk–Chesapeake area. Ambitious plans to build a public–private partnership toll-road parallel to US 460 from Norfolk to Petersburg have met with resistance and the toll-road project has been canceled, with the new project now scaled back to converting the existing US 460 to a limited-access expressway or to a fully controlled access freeway with bypasses around some towns.
