= Transportation Equity Act for the 21st Century =

Federal highway legislation

- Long title: An Act to authorize funds for Federal-aid highways, highway safety programs, and transit programs, and for other purposes.
- Acronyms (colloquial): TEA-21
- Nicknames: BESTEA bill, TEA 21 bill, Transportation Reauthorization bill
- Enacted by: the 105th United States Congress

Citations
- Public law: Pub. L. 105–178 (text) (PDF)
- Statutes at Large: 112 Stat. 107

Legislative history
- Introduced in the House as H.R. 2400 by Bud Shuster (R–PA) on September 4, 1997; Passed the House on April 1, 1998 (337-80); Passed the Senate on April 2, 1998 (unanimous consent, in lieu of S. 1173); Reported by the joint conference committee on May 22, 1998; agreed to by the House on May 22, 1998 (297-86) and by the Senate on May 22, 1998 (88-5); Signed into law by President Bill Clinton on June 9, 1998

The United States federal Transportation Equity Act for the 21st Century (TEA-21) is a federal transportation bill enacted June 9, 1998, as Pub. L. 105–178 (text) (PDF) and 112 Stat. 107. TEA-21 authorized federal surface transportation programs for highways, highway safety, and transit for a 6-year period from 1998 to 2003. Because Congress could not agree on funding levels, the Act, which had continued past 2003 by means of temporary extensions, was allowed to lapse.

== History ==
The bill was introduced in the House by Bud Shuster (R–PA) on September 4, 1997. The transportation equity act requires that seven planning factors be included in regional transportation plans. The plans must:

1. support the economic vitality of the metropolitan planning area, especially by enabling global competitiveness, productivity and efficiency;
2. increase the safety and security of the transportation system for motorized and non-motorized users;
3. increase the accessibility and mobility options available to people and for freight;
4. protect and enhance the environment, especially by promoting energy conservation and improving quality of life;
5. enhance the integration and connectivity of the transportation system across and between modes, for people and freight;
6. promote efficient system management and operation; and
7. emphasize the efficient preservation of existing transportation systems.

Factor 4 was amended by the Safe, Accountable, Flexible, Efficient Transportation Equity Act (SAFETEA-LU) in 2005 and reads: "protect and enhance the environment, promote energy conservation, improve the quality of life, and promote consistency between transportation improvements and State and local planned growth and economic development patterns".

Section 1211(d) prevents the United States Department of Transportation (USDOT) from requiring state departments of transportation to use the metric system. This has delayed metrication in the United States with respect to road construction, though some states had already completely converted.

== Funding programs ==
- JARC (Job Access Reverse Commute)

== See also ==
- Surface Transportation and Uniform Relocation Assistance Act
- Intermodal Surface Transportation Efficiency Act (ISTEA, 1991)
- Moving Ahead for Progress in the 21st Century Act (MAP-21, 2012)
