= National Maximum Speed Law =

Defunct U.S. federal highway legislation

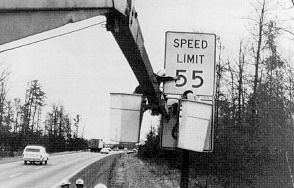
55 miles per hour (89 km/h) speed limit sign erected

As an emergency response to the 1973 oil crisis, on November 26, 1973, President Richard Nixon proposed a national 50 mph (80 km/h) speed limit for passenger vehicles and a 55 mph (89 km/h) speed limit for trucks and buses. In response to Nixon's proposal, the National Maximum Speed Limit (NMSL) was enacted in the 1974 Emergency Highway Energy Conservation Act that withheld Federal Highway funds from states that refused to comply with provisions of the law, including a maximum speed limit of 55 miles per hour (89 km/h) for passenger vehicles, an increase Nixon approved in signing the final legislation.

By 1987, fuel price increases had slowed after the OPEC Oil Embargo ended, and the limit was increased to 65 miles per hour (105 km/h), but the law would remain in place until 1995 as proponents cited reduced traffic fatalities and pollution.

While some Americans recognized a patriotic duty to reduce petroleum-based energy consumption during the embargo, the speed limit was disregarded by most motorists, and at least four states opposed the law. Actions ranged from proposing deals for an exemption to de-emphasizing speed limit enforcement. The NMSL was modified in 1987 and 1988 to allow up to 65 mph (105 km/h) limits on certain limited-access rural roads. Congress introduced legislation to repeal the NMSL which was signed into law by President Bill Clinton on December 8, 1995.

The power to set speed limits historically belonged to the states. Before the NMSL, the sole exception to this occurred during World War II, when the U.S. Office of Defense Transportation established a national maximum "Victory Speed Limit" of 35 miles per hour (56 km/h), in addition to gasoline and tire rationing, to help conserve fuel and rubber for the American war effort. Although it was disregarded by some motorists, the Victory Speed Limit lasted from May 1942, to August 14, 1945, when the war ended. Immediately before the NMSL became effective, speed limits were as high as 75 mph (121 km/h). (Kansas had lowered its turnpike speed limit from 80 mph (130 km/h) before 1974.) Montana and Nevada generally posted no speed limits on highways, limiting drivers to only whatever was safe for conditions.

== 1973—55 mph National Speed Limit ==
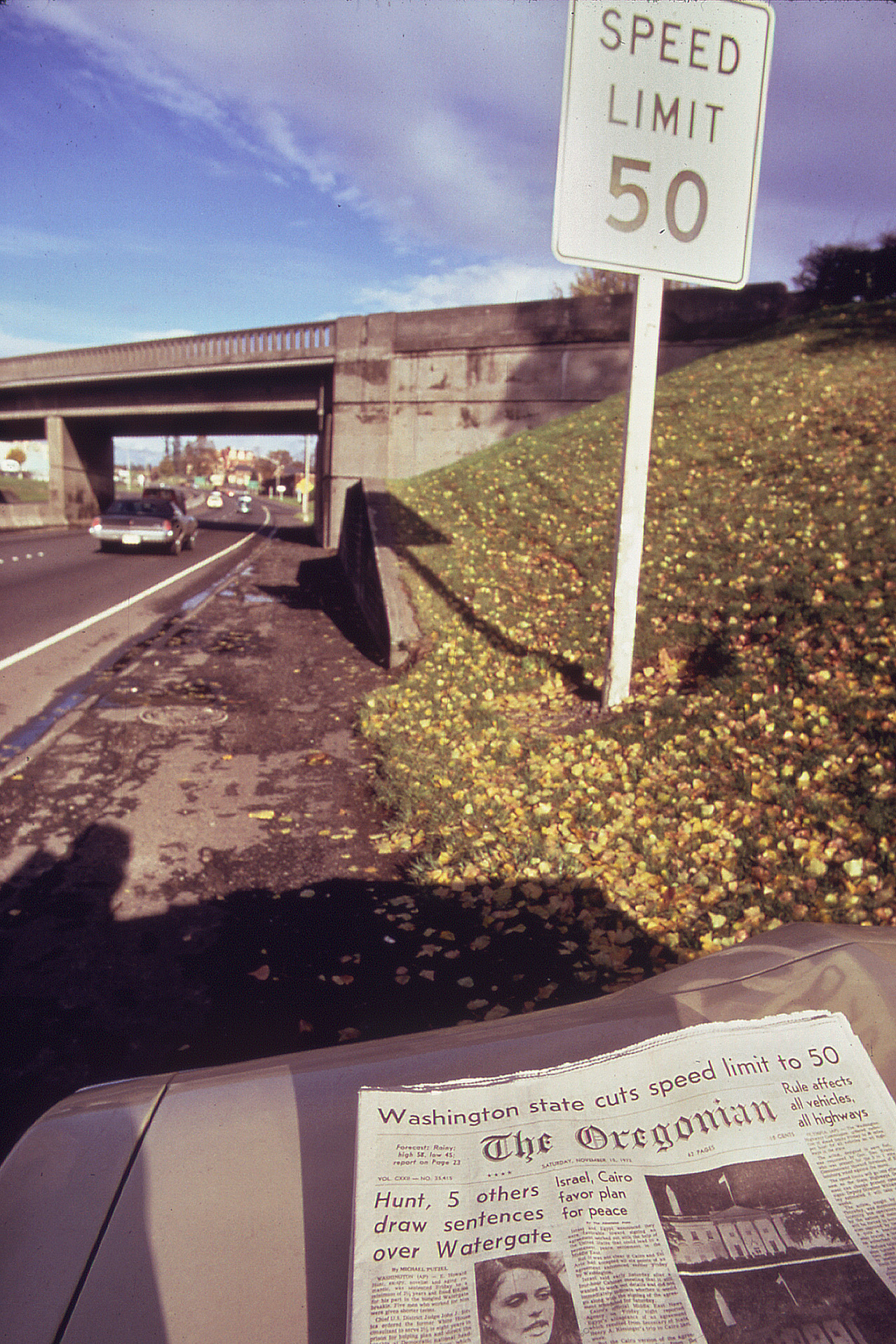
In 1973, Congress enacted a national speed limit of 55 mph (89 km/h). Some states, such as Washington, enacted lower speed limits.

As of November 20, 1973, several states had modified speed limits:

- 50 mph (80 km/h): Rhode Island, Maryland, Massachusetts, New Jersey, New York, Vermont, and Washington
- 55 mph (89 km/h): North Carolina and Oregon
- California lowered some 70 mph (110 km/h) limits to 65 mph (105 km/h).
- In late November 1973, Texas Governor Dolph Briscoe recommended adoption of a 55 mph (89 km/h) statewide limit. On December 4, the Texas Highway Commission, with a 3–0 vote, adopted this 55 mph (89 km/h) speed limit, citing unsafe speed differentials between the flow of traffic and people driving too slowly to comply with Nixon's and Briscoe's requests for voluntary slowdowns. The legality of the measure was questioned, and two Texas legislators threatened to sue to block the limit. By December 6, Texas Attorney General John Hill ruled that the speed reduction "'was in excess' of the commissioners' legal power," citing that a 1943 Texas Attorney General's opinion held that the legislature holds the power to set the statewide speed limit and the commission's authority was limited to changing it in specific locales where safety factors required lower limits.

On November 26, 1973, President Richard Nixon proposed a national 50 mph (80 km/h) speed limit for passenger vehicles and a 55 mph (89 km/h) speed limit for trucks and buses. Also proposed were a ban on ornamental lighting, no gasoline sales on Sunday, and a 15% cut in gasoline production to reduce total gas consumption by 200,000 barrels a day, representing a 2.2% drop from annualized 1973 gasoline consumption levels. (Note: The 2.2% drop figure was calculated by finding daily consumption to be 9,299,684 barrels of petroleum. Obtain 1973's petroleum consumption from transportation sector at 2.1e from the Energy Consumption by Sector section, then convert to barrels using A1 in the Thermal Conversion Factors section (assume "conventional motor gasoline" since ethanol-based or purportedly smog-reducing gas was not common in 1973).) Nixon cited scientific data showing that cars achieve maximum efficiency between 40 and 50 mph (64 and 80 km/h) and that trucks and buses were most efficient at 55 mph (89 km/h).

The California Trucking Association, the largest trucking association in the United States, opposed differential speed limits on grounds that they are "not wise from a safety standpoint."

== Enactment ==
Emergency Highway Energy Conservation Act
- Long title: An Act to conserve energy on the Nation's highways
- Enacted by: the 93rd United States Congress
- Effective: March 3, 1974

Citations
- Public law: Pub. L. 93–239
- Statutes at Large: 87 Stat. 1046

Legislative history
- Introduced in the House by James J. Howard (D‑NJ 3rd) on November 8, 1973; Committee consideration by House Transportation and Infrastructure; Passed the House on December 3, 1973; Passed the Senate on December 14, 1973; Signed into law by President Richard Nixon on January 2, 1974

Major amendments
- Federal-Aid Highway Amendments of 1974; Surface Transportation and Uniform Relocation Assistance Act; National Highway System Designation Act of 1995

The Emergency Highway Energy Conservation Act was a bill in the U.S. Congress that included the National Maximum Speed Limit. States had to agree to the limit to continue receiving highway trust funds. The uniform speed limit was signed into law by Nixon on January 2, 1974, and became effective 60 days later, by requiring the limit as a condition of each state receiving highway funds, a use of the Commerce Clause of the United States Constitution.

The legislation required 55 mph (89 km/h) speed limits on all four-lane divided highways unless the road had a lower limit before November 1, 1973. In some cases, like the New York State Thruway, the 50 mph (80 km/h) speed limit had to be raised to comply with the law. The law capped speed limits at 55 mph (89 km/h) on all other roads.

A survey by the Associated Press found that, as of Wednesday, January 2, 1974:

- 12 states already had maximum speed limits of 55 mph (89 km/h).
- 9 states had maximum speed limits of 50 mph (80 km/h).
- 29 states had to lower limits.

That includes some states that voluntarily lowered their limits in advance of the federal requirement.

On May 12, 1974, the United States Senate defeated a proposal by Senator Bob Dole to raise the speed limit to 60 mph (97 km/h). The 55 mph (89 km/h) was established as a uniform national speed limit when President Gerald Ford signed into law the Federal-Aid Highway Amendments of 1974 on January 4, 1975.

== Safety impact ==
The limit's effect on highway safety is unclear. Both during the time the law was enacted and after it was repealed, automobile fatalities decreased, which was widely attributed mainly to automobile safety improvements, owing to an increase in the safety of cars themselves, and the passage of mandatory seat belt legislation by all states except New Hampshire from the mid-1980s to the early 1990s. This decrease in fatalities from automobile accidents makes figuring out the actual impact of the law difficult. Although the vast majority of states reported fewer traffic deaths in 1974 compared with 1973, there were in fact three states where traffic deaths actually increased in 1974, 1975 and 1976, compared to 1973, notwithstanding the 55 mph (90 km/h) speed limit: Alaska, New Hampshire and Wyoming.

According to the National Research Council, there was a decrease in fatalities of about 3,000 to 5,000 lives in 1974, and about 2,000 to 4,000 lives saved annually thereafter through 1983 because of slower and more uniform traffic speeds since the law took effect. Later, the National Academies wrote that there is "a strong link between vehicle speed and crash severity [which] supports the need for setting maximum limits on high-speed roads" but that "the available data do not provide an adequate basis for precisely quantifying the effects that changes in speed limits have on driving speeds, safety, and travel time on different kinds of roads." The Academies report also observed that on rural interstates, the free-flowing traffic speed should be the major determinant of the speed limit: "Drivers typically can anticipate appropriate driving speeds." This is due, in part, to the strong access control in these areas but also is an acknowledgement of the difficulty of enforcing the 55 mph (90 km/h) speed limit in these areas.

A Cato Institute report showed that the safety record worsened in the first few months of the new speed limits, suggesting that the fatality drop found by the NRC was a statistical anomaly that regressed to the mean by 1978. After the oil crisis abated, the NMSL was retained mainly due to the possible safety aspect.

Insurance Institute for Highway Safety analysts wrote three papers that argue that increase from 55 to 65 mph (89 to 105 km/h) on rural roads led to a 25% to 30% increase in deaths (1/3 from increased travel, 2/3 from increased speed) while the full repeal in 1995 led to a further 15% increase in fatalities. In contrast, researchers at University of California Transportation Science Center argue that the interstates in question are only part of the equation, one also must account for traffic moving off the relatively more dangerous country roads and onto the relatively safer interstates. Accounting for this they find that raising rural speed limits to 65 mph (105 km/h) caused a 3.4% to 5.1% decrease in fatalities.

== Fuel savings ==
In 1998, the Transportation Research Board footnoted an estimate that the NMSL reduced fuel consumption by 0.2 to 1.0 percent. Rural interstates, the roads most visibly affected by the NMSL, accounted for 10% of the U.S.'s vehicle-miles-traveled in 1973, and although dropping speeds from 75 to 55 mph (120 to 90 km/h) reduces air resistance by nearly half, such free-flowing roads typically provide more fuel-efficient travel than conventional roads.

== Opposition and noncompliance ==
Despite federal compliance standards mandated by Congress that no more than 50 percent of free-flowing traffic on 55 mph-posted highways exceed 55 mph from 1981 onwards, which required up to a 10 percent reduction in federal highway funding for states in noncompliance, by the 1980s traffic surveys showed the NMSL was widely violated:

- The speed limit had very low compliance, contrary to the commonly accepted engineering practice that says that the speed limit should criminalize only the fastest 15% of drivers:
  - From April to June 1982, speed was monitored on New York's Interstate highways, and an 83% noncompliance rate was found despite extreme penalties ranging from $100 (1982 dollars, equal to $334 today) or 30 days jail on a first offense to $500 (1982 dollars, equal to $1,668 today), up to 180 days in jail, and a six-month driver's license revocation upon third conviction in 18 months.
  - In the fourth quarter of 1988, 85% of drivers violated the 55 mph (89 km/h) speed limits on Connecticut rural interstates.
  - In 1985, Texas's State Department of Highways and Public Transportation surveyed motorist speeds at 101 locations on six types of urban and rural roads. It found that 82.2% of motorists violated the speed limit on rural interstates, 67.2% violated speed limits on urban interstates, and 61.6% violated speed limits on all roads.
- Western states began to reduce fines in the 1980s, effectively minimizing the impact of the 55 mph (90 km/h) limit:
  - Arizona, Idaho, Montana, and Nevada replaced traditional speeding fines with $5–$15 energy wasting fines as long as drivers did not exceed the speed limit in effect before the 55 mph (90 km/h) federal requirement.
    - Nevada's energy wasting fine was enacted on April 15, 1981, when signed by Governor Robert List. Motorists not exceeding 70 mph (110 km/h) in 55 mph (89 km/h) zones could be issued $5 "energy wasting" fines. However, standard speeding tickets were still allowed and "troopers were directed not to take the new law as a signal to stop writing tickets."
  - In 1986, North Dakota's fine for speeding up to 15 mph (24 km/h) over the limit was only $15 and had no license points.
  - South Dakota cut speeding fines in 1985 and stopped assessing points for being 10 mph (16 km/h) or less above the speed limit in 1986.
  - On August 1, 1986, Minnesota, which normally suspended licenses after three tickets, stopped counting speeding tickets for no more than 65 mph (105 km/h).
- The 1980 Republican Party platform called for the repeal of the 55 mph National Maximum Speed Limit. In its section on Rural Transportation, it stated: "We believe the federal 55 miles per hour speed limit is counterproductive, and contributes to the high costs of goods and services to all communities, particularly in rural America. The most effective, no-cost federal assistance program available would be for each state to set its own speed limit."
- In 1981, 33 state legislatures debated measures to oppose the NMSL.
- In 1985, the U.S. Department of Transportation found the states of Arizona, Maryland (designated a "Strict Enforcement Area" by the American Automobile Association), and Vermont were out of compliance with the 55 mph (90 km/h) national speed limit, according to speed monitoring data collected and submitted by these states, showing that over 50 percent of their highway traffic exceeded 55 mph (90 km/h) in Fiscal Year 1984; the House Public Works and Transportation Subcommittee on Surface Transportation held hearings on July 23, 1985, to discuss proposals to revise the federal compliance requirements for 55 mph (90 km/h) on the basis of recommendations made by the National Research Council, to help these and other states come into compliance and avoid sanctions.
- Some law enforcement officials openly questioned the speed limit. In 1986, Jerry Baum, director of the South Dakota Highway Patrol, said "Why must I have a trooper stationed on an interstate, at 10 in the morning, worried about a guy driving 60 mph (100 km/h) on a system designed to be traveled at 70? He could be out on a Friday night watching for drunken drivers."
- Even organizations supporting the NMSL, such as the American Automobile Association (AAA) provided lists of locations where the limit was strictly enforced.
- On June 1, 1986, Nevada challenged the NMSL by posting a 70 mph (110 km/h) limit on 3 miles (5 km) of Interstate 80. The Nevada statute authorizing that speed limit included language that invalidated itself if the federal government suspended transportation funding. As it happened, the Federal Highway Administration immediately withheld highway funding, which automatically invalidated the statute by its own terms.
- Finally, on September 24, 1986, the U.S. Senate voted in favor of an amendment to pending federal highway legislation, introduced by Senator Steve Symms (R-ID) and supported by President Ronald Reagan, to allow states to increase speed limits on rural Interstate highways to 65 mph. Both the amendment and the highway bill died in a House-Senate conference committee before Congress adjourned for that year.

== 1987 to 1995 — rural 65 mph to total repeal ==
In the April 2, 1987, Surface Transportation and Uniform Relocation Assistance Act, Congress permitted states to raise speed limits to 65 mph (105 km/h) on rural Interstate highways. In a bill that passed in mid-December 1987, Congress allowed certain non-Interstate rural roads built to Interstate standards to have the higher speed limits. As of December 29, 1987, the states of California, Florida, Illinois, Iowa, Kansas, Kentucky, and Oklahoma had applied for and been accepted into this program. The program was originally slated to last four years. A total of 40 states raised their speed limits to 65 mph on rural Interstate highway and non-Interstate rural roads built to Interstate standards by 1988, joined by Massachusetts (Turnpike only) in 1992, and by Maryland, New York and Pennsylvania in the summer of 1995.

The higher speed limit on most rural Interstates and similar non-Interstate roads was vehemently opposed by highway safety advocates, including the National Safety Council, Public Citizen, Mothers Against Drunk Driving, American Trucking Associations, and the Insurance Institute for Highway Safety, all ardent, long-time supporters of 55 mph (90 km/h). On the other hand, the new 65 mph speed limit for rural Interstates was welcomed by the California Highway Patrol, National Motorists Association (née Citizens' Coalition for Rational Traffic Laws, a motorists' advocacy group), American Motorcyclist Association, Owner-Operator Independent Drivers Association (OOIDA), the automotive enthusiast magazines Motor Trend, Road & Track, Car and Driver, and the automotive journalist Brock Yates (1934–2016)--perhaps the most outspoken published opponent of the 55 mph National Maximum Speed Limit.

Under the Intermodal Surface Transportation Efficiency Act of 1991 (ISTEA), passed by Congress and signed by President George H. W. Bush on December 18, 1991, the 65 mph speed limit was made permanent for rural non-Interstate highways built to Interstate standards. It also declared a moratorium on Federal sanctions against states in noncompliance with the 55 mph (90 km/h) national speed limit for fiscal years 1990 and 1991, and directed the U.S. Department of Transportation to promulgate new compliance standards for the 65 mph rural freeways, as well as for all 55 mph (90 km/h) highways. As required by ISTEA, they were published in the Code of Federal Regulations 23 CFR Part 1260, but no further action was taken by USDOT against the states for speed limit noncompliance for the last few years the NMSL was still in effect until it was repealed in 1995.

=== Reclassified roads ===
A few roads that were not Interstate Highways but had been built to Interstate standards were redesignated as Interstate Highways to qualify for the increased speed limit:

- Kansas petitioned the Federal Highway Administration on May 14, 1987, to "designate the turnpike as an Interstate Highway between Topeka and Emporia." This Kansas Turnpike segment had existed since 1956 without a numerical designation. Interstate status was granted, Interstate 335 was designated, and the 65 mph speed limit signs went up.
- Interstate 88 in Illinois had previously been designated as Illinois Route 5.
- 50 miles (80 km) of the Maine Turnpike between Portland and West Gardiner were designated as Interstate 495 in 1988. The designation for this segment was changed in 2004 to Interstate 95 to simplify the Interstate numbering scheme in Maine.

=== 1995 repeal ===
Congress lifted all federal speed limit controls in the National Highway System Designation Act of 1995, returning all speed limit determination authority to the states effective December 8, 1995. Several states immediately reverted to already existing laws. For example, most Texas rural limits that were above 55 mph (89 km/h) in 1974 immediately reverted to 70 mph (112 km/h), causing some legal confusion before the new signs were posted. Montana reverted to non-numerical speed limits on most rural highways, but its legislature adopted 75 mph (121 km/h) as a limit in 1999; as a result, according to Insurance Institute for Highway Safety researcher Anne McCartt, "What's impressive is the huge drop in the percent of vehicles going very fast.... The proportion of vehicles exceeding 75 mph (120 km/h), the limit set [by Montana] in 1999, tumbled 45 percent. The proportion surpassing 80 mph plummeted 85 percent. Large trucks slowed, too." (She did not mention that the IIHS survey of traffic speeds on Interstate highways in 2006 she referred to, found Montana, as compared with New Mexico and Nevada, had the highest compliance with the 75 mph (120 km/h) speed limit on rural interstates: 76 percent.) Hawaii was the last state to raise its speed limit when, in response to public outcry after an experiment with traffic enforcement cameras in 2002, it raised the maximum speed limit on parts of Interstates H-1 and H-3 to 60 mph (97 km/h).

Despite the repeal of federal speed limit controls, the 2011 maximum speed limits were on average lower than those of 1974:

- States with same speed limit as pre-1974: 25 (Note: Includes Texas where the same pre-1974 speed limits are applicable on the vast majority of rural roads despite some 75 and 80 mph limits.)
- States with higher speed limit than pre-1974: 8
- States with lower speed limits than pre-1974: 17 (Note: Includes Virginia where the vast majority of rural freeways have a 65 mph (105 km/h) limit.) The introduction to 70 or 75 mph (112 or 120 km/h) speed limits was in effect that year. The introduction to 80 mph (almost 130 km/h) limits was in about 2005, and Texas introduced 85 mph (136 km/h) in 2011.

Although traffic deaths and death rates generally declined in the United States between 1989 and 2009, highway safety advocates have long continued to assert that increases in state speed limits after the repeal of the National Maximum Speed Law have had a detrimental effect on highway safety, and they have conducted many studies including statistical analyses that claim to support this argument. For example, the Insurance Institute for Highway Safety declared that "each 5 mph increase in the maximum speed limit resulted in a 4 percent increase in fatalities. The increase on Interstates and freeways... was 8 percent. Comparing the annual number of fatalities in the 41 states [studied] with the number that would have been expected if each state's maximum speed limit had remained unchanged since 1993, [we] arrived at the estimate of 33,000 additional fatalities over the 20-year period [from 1993 to 2013]."

== Speedometers ==
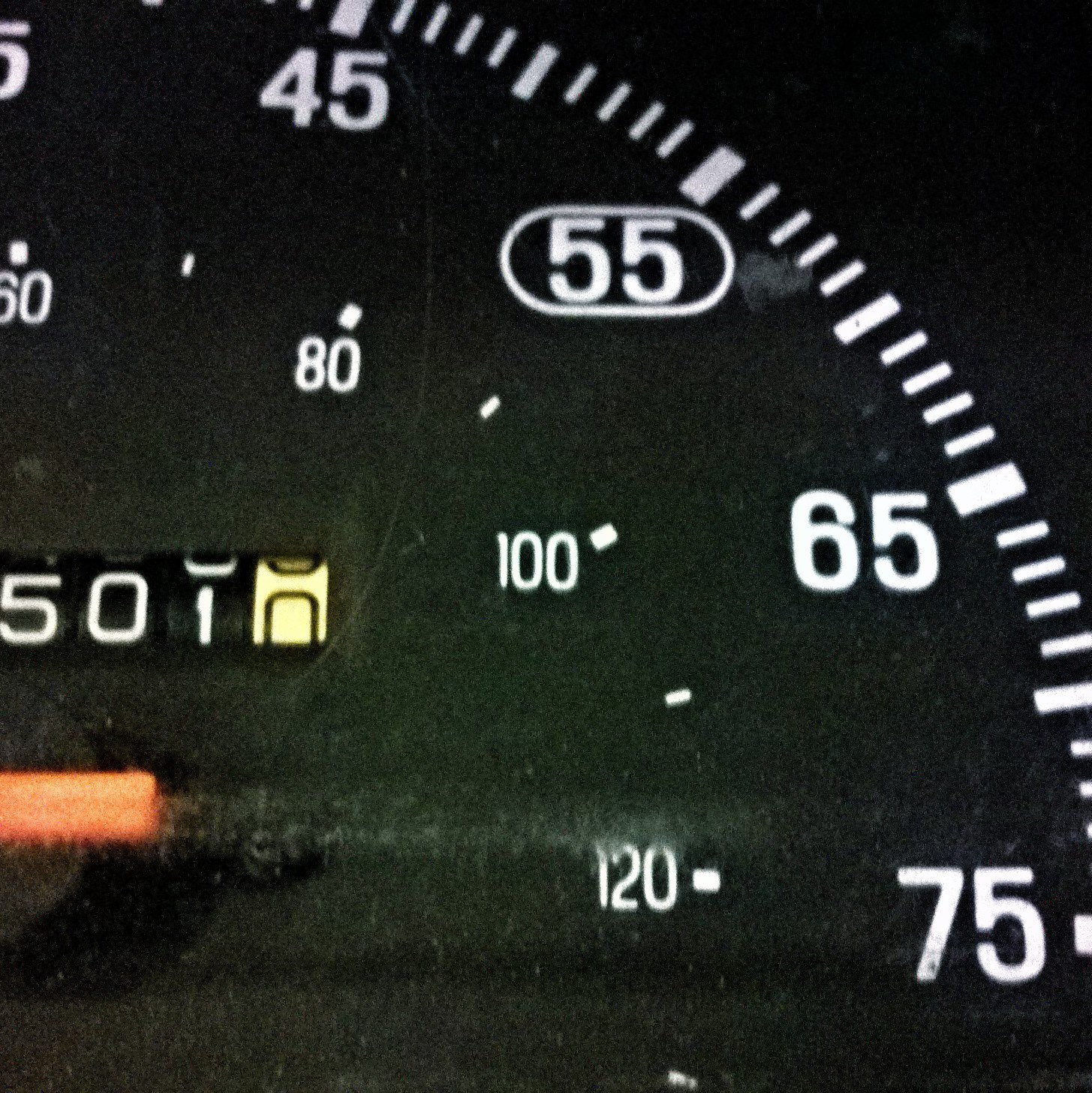
55 mph is emphasized on this dashboard

On September 1, 1979, the National Highway Traffic Safety Administration (NHTSA) required speedometers to have special emphasis on the number 55 and a maximum speed of 85 miles per hour (137 km/h). This was enforced under the Federal Motor Vehicle Safety Standards (FMVSS), which regulated speedometer and odometer accuracy. Some manufacturers circumvented the rule by including extra lines beyond 85 to show higher speeds. NHTSA revoked the standard (FMVSS 127) entirely on March 25, 1982, eliminating speedometer and odometer rules because they were "unlikely to yield significant safety benefits" and "adds little to the information provided to the driver by a roadside speed limit sign."

== In popular culture ==
The number 55 became a popular shorthand for the 55 mph speed limit. For example, a hand with a pair of fives in Texas hold'em poker is referred to as a "speed limit". Rock musician Sammy Hagar released "I Can't Drive 55", a hit single protesting the rule. The title of Minutemen's critically acclaimed double album Double Nickels on the Dime refers to the NMSL, and in jest, to the Sammy Hagar single. The bill limiting speed limits was used as a debate topic in Season 2 Episode 12 of The Simpsons.

One of a series of advertising campaigns for the 55 mph speed limit offered, "Speed limit 55. It's not just a good idea. It's the law.". This was parodied with a more absolute statement based on the speed of light: "186,000 miles per second. It's not just a good idea, it's the law."
