= Strategic material =

Important raw materials

Strategic material is any sort of raw material that is important to an individual's or organization's strategic plan and supply chain management. Lack of supply of strategic materials may leave an organization or government vulnerable to disruption of the manufacturing of products which require those materials. It can also refer to a group or department that manages these materials. The term "critical material" is increasingly used rather than "strategic material".

In government terms, they are materials, usually raw materials that have a particular strategic significance to a government or nation, often in time of war. Their strategic need is because of their crucial importance for either economic or military purposes. Some materials are relatively simple to procure or produce, but are required in great quantities during wartime. Others are obscure and technically complex to obtain or create. Although not required in large quantities, their irreplaceability and critical need makes them especially valuable. Foodstuffs are not generally classed as strategic materials: although vital, they are treated separately.

Techniques for replacing strategic materials with ersatz substitutes have become highly important. These also include the minimisation of or the recovery and recycling of such materials.

As well as depending upon strategic materials, warfare may be carried out with their specific goal in sight. Japanese expansion in World War II targeted rubber crops and their plantation areas in particular. Conflict between Germany and France has repeatedly focussed upon the iron and steel bulk resources of their border region.

== Government approaches ==
=== United States ===
The US Defense Logistic Agency manages strategic materials for the US military.

The United States critical materials list is a designation of materials or minerals considered essential for the economic or national security of the United States, where there is a high risk of supply chain disruption.

=== European Union ===
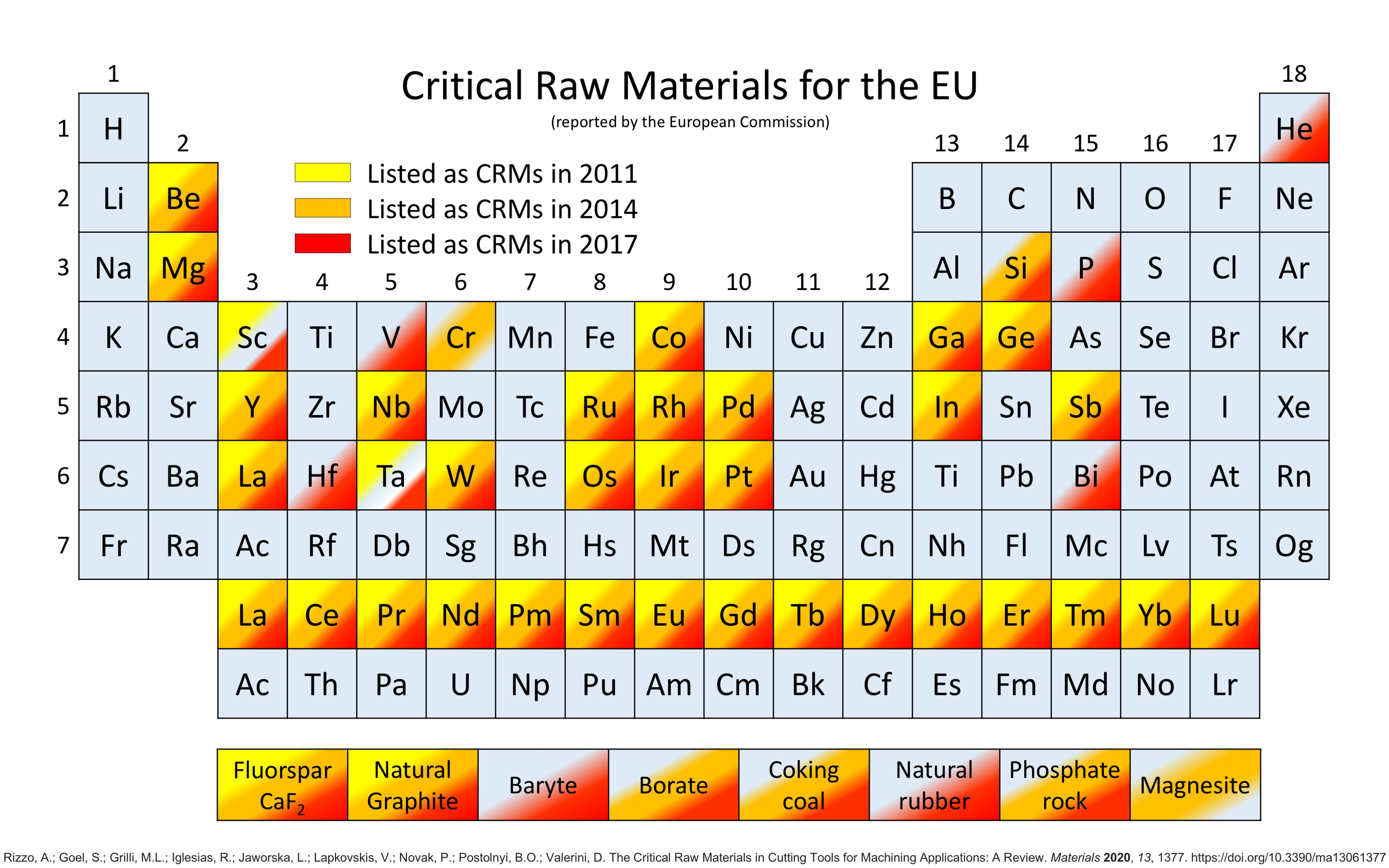
Summary of the critical raw materials lists reported by the European Commission in 2011, 2014 and 2017

Since 2011, the European Commission has triennially assessed a list of Critical Raw Materials (CRMs), with 14 CRMs identified in 2011, 20 in 2014, 27 in 2017, 30 in 2020 and 34 in 2023. These materials are mainly used in energy transition and digital technologies. These are primarily materials used in energy transition and digital technologies. Then, in March 2023, Commission President Ursula von der Leyen proposed the Critical Raw Materials Act, "for a regulation of the European Parliament and of the European Council establishing a framework for ensuring a secure and sustainable supply of critical raw materials".

=== Australia ===
In 2024 the Australian government announced a "Future Made in Australia" initiative as a new industrial policy for Australia, supporting manufacturing and exploitation of critical mineral resources as part of Australia's renewable energy transition.

The Australian government maintains a Critical Minerals List of 32 minerals 'essential to our modern technologies, economies and national security' and a Strategic Materials List of five minerals 'important for the global transition to net zero and broader strategic applications'.

== In business ==
Strategic materials encompass a subset of raw materials required to make a product. The strategic materials may be limited in number or subject to shortages. In this case, the strategic plan would call for an alternative supply chain or alternative materials in the event of a breakdown in the current supply chain.
