= National Highway System (United States) =

Highway network in the United States

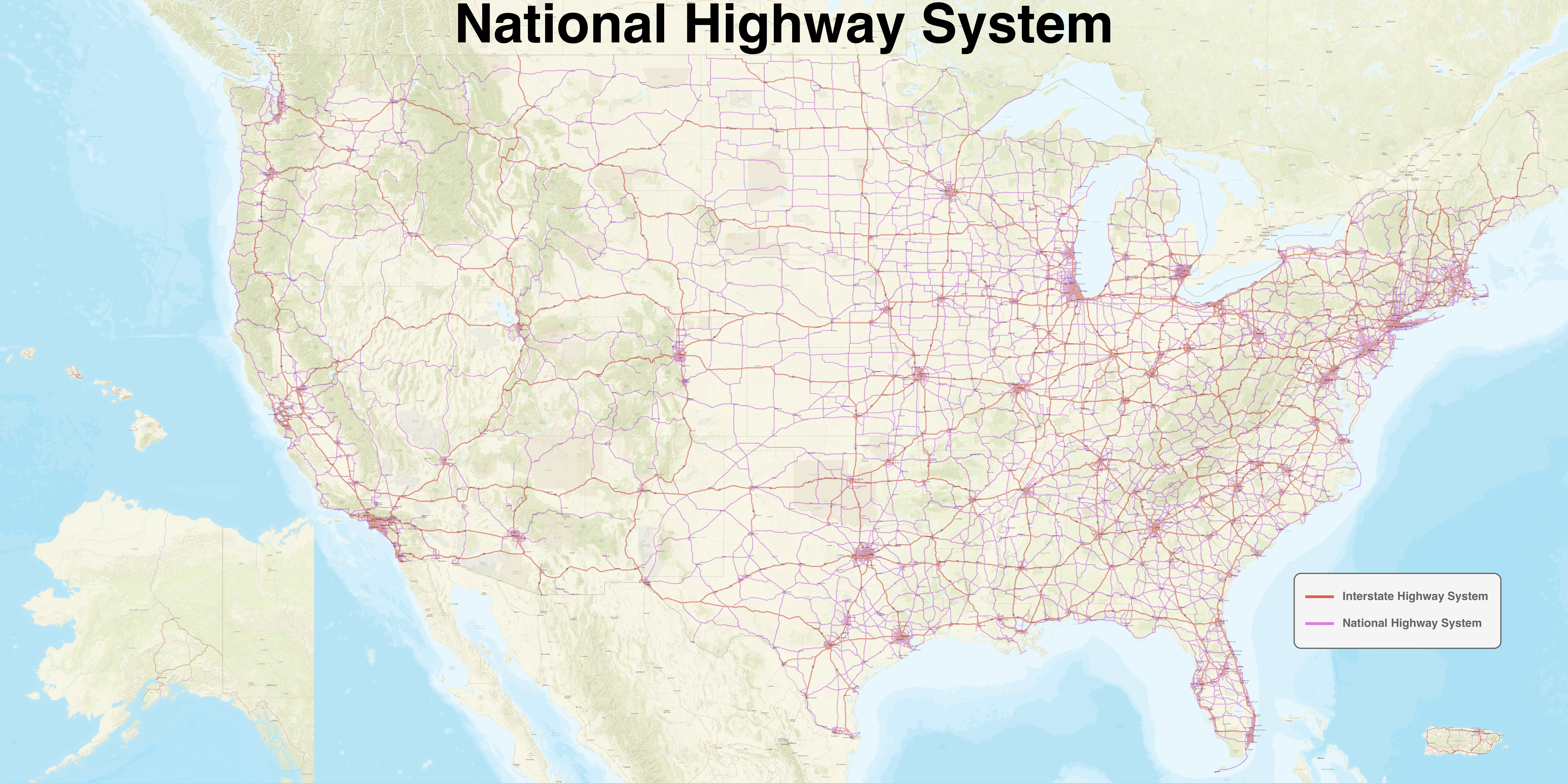
- Interstate Highway System National Highway System

System information
- Length: 160,955 mi (259,032 km)
- Formed: November 28, 1995

Highway names
- Interstates: Interstate nn (I-nn)
- US Highways: U.S. Highway nn, U.S. Route nn (US nn, US-nn)
- State: Varies by state
- County roads: County Road nn, County Route nn (CR nn, Co. Rd. nn)
- Other local roads: Varies by locality

System links
- National Highway System; Interstate; STRAHNET

The National Highway System (NHS) is a network of strategic highways within the United States, including the Interstate Highway System and other roads serving major airports, ports, military bases, rail or truck terminals, railway stations, pipeline terminals and other strategic transport facilities. Altogether, it constitutes the largest highway system in the world.

Individual states are encouraged to focus federal funds on improving the efficiency and safety of this network. The roads within the system were identified by the United States Department of Transportation (USDOT) in cooperation with the states, local officials, and metropolitan planning organizations (MPOs) and approved by the United States Congress in 1995.

== Legislation ==
National Highway System Designation Act of 1995
- Long title: An Act to amend title 23, United States Code, to designate the National Highway System, and for other purposes.
- Enacted by: the 104th United States Congress

Citations
- Public law: Pub. L. 104-59
- Statutes at Large: 109 Stat. 568

Legislative history
- Introduced in the Senate as S. 440 by John Warner on February 16, 1995; Signed into law by President Bill Clinton on November 28, 1995

The Intermodal Surface Transportation Efficiency Act (ISTEA) in 1991 established certain key routes such as the Interstate Highway System, be included. The act provided a framework to develop a National Intermodal Transportation System which "consists of all forms of transportation in a unified, interconnected manner, including the transportation systems of the future, to reduce energy consumption and air pollution while promoting economic development and supporting the Nation's preeminent position in international commerce".

The National Highway System Designation Act of 1995 (Pub. L. 104–59 (text) (PDF), 109 Stat. 568, COMPS-1425) is a United States act of Congress that was signed into law by President Bill Clinton on November 28, 1995. The legislation designated about 160,955 miles (259,032 km) of roads, including the Interstate Highway System, as the NHS.

The act served several other purposes, including restoring $5.4 billion in funding to state highway departments, giving Congress the power to prioritize highway system projects, repealing all federal speed limit controls, and prohibits the federal government from requiring states to use federal-aid highway funds to convert existing signs or purchase new signs with metric units.

The act also created a State Infrastructure Bank pilot program. Ten states were chosen in 1996 for this new method of road financing. These banks would lend money like regular banks, with funding coming from the federal government or the private sector, and they would be repaid through highway tolls or taxes. In 1997, 28 more states asked to be part of the program. Ohio was the first state to use a state infrastructure bank to start building a road. An advantage of this method was completing projects faster; state laws and the lack of appropriate projects were potential problems.

== Overview ==
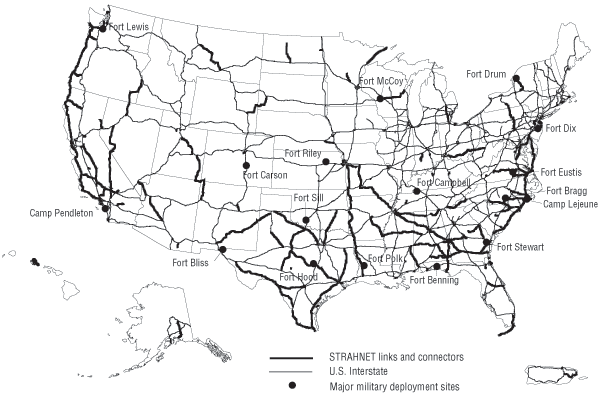
A map of the Strategic Highway Network, one component of the NHS

A map of average freight truck traffic on the NHS in 2015

According to the Federal Highway Administration, the 160,000-mile (260,000 km) National Highway System includes roads important to the United States' economy, defense, and mobility, from one or more of the following road networks. Specific routes may be part of more than one sub-system:

- Interstate Highway System: The entire Interstate Highway System, which is also known as the Dwight D. Eisenhower National System of Interstate and Defense Highways, is included in the NHS, but retains its separate identity within the NHS.
- Other Principal Arterials: Highways in rural and urban areas which provide access between an arterial and a major port, airport, public transportation facility, or other intermodal transportation facility. Facilities accessed include 207 airports, 198 ports, 190 rail or truck terminals, 67 Amtrak railway stations, 58 pipeline terminals and 82 intercity bus terminals, 307 public transit stations, 37 ferry terminals, and 20 multi-purpose passenger terminals.
- Strategic Highway Network (STRAHNET): The entire network of highways which are important to the United States' strategic defense policy and which provide defense access, continuity, and emergency capabilities for defense purposes.
- Major Strategic Highway Network Connectors: Highways which provide access between major military installations and routes which are part of STRAHNET.
- Intermodal Connectors: Routes which provide access between major intermodal facilities and the other four subsystems making up the NHS.

The system includes 4% of the nation's roads, but carries more than 40% of all highway traffic, 75% of heavy truck traffic, and 90% of tourist traffic. All urban areas with a population of over 50,000 and about 90% of America's population live within 5 miles (8.0 km) of the network, which is the longest in the world.

== See also ==
- National Highway System (Canada)
