= Title 23 of the Code of Federal Regulations =

US national highway rules

CFR Title 23 - Highways is one of fifty titles comprising the United States Code of Federal Regulations (CFR), containing the principal set of rules and regulations issued by federal agencies regarding highways. It is available in digital and printed form, and can be referenced online using the Electronic Code of Federal Regulations (e-CFR).

== Structure ==
The table of contents, as reflected in the e-CFR is as follows:

Volume	Chapter	Parts	Regulatory Entity
1	I	1-999	Federal Highway Administration, Department of Transportation
	II	1200-1299	National Highway Traffic Safety Administration and Federal Highway Administration, Department of Transportation
	III	1300-1399	National Highway Traffic Safety Administration, Department of Transportation

== See also ==
- Title 23 of the United States Code
