= Federal-Aid Highway Amendments of 1974 =

Federal highway legislation

- Long title: An Act to authorize appropriations for the construction of certain highways in accordance with title 23 of the United States Code, and for other purposes.
- Enacted by: the 93rd United States Congress

Citations
- Public law: Pub. L. 93–643
- Statutes at Large: 88 Stat. 2281

Codification
- Acts amended: Emergency Highway Energy Conservation Act

Legislative history
- Introduced in the Senate by Lloyd M. Bentsen (D‑TX) on August 20, 1974; Committee consideration by Senate Public Works; Passed the Senate on September 11, 1974 (85-0); Passed the House on December 16, 1974; Signed into law by President Gerald Ford on January 4, 1975

The Federal-Aid Highway Amendments of 1974 was signed into law by President Gerald Ford on January 4, 1975. Among other changes, the law permanently implemented a national 55-mph speed limit (which had already been a temporary limit) for the Interstate Highway System. It also established the Federal Bridge Gross Weight Formula as law, which governed the weight-to-length ratio of trucks in order to protect highway bridges and infrastructure.

== See also ==
- Federal-Aid Highway Act
- Speed limits in the United States
