= Jeff Morales =

American public servant

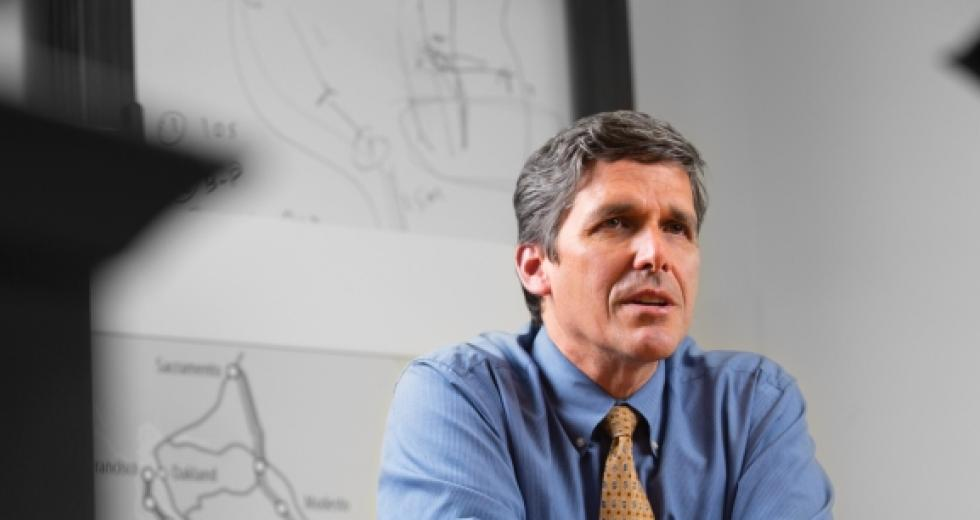
- Education: George Washington University (BS)
- Political party: Democratic

Jeffrey Morales is an American public servant who was the CEO of the California High Speed Rail Authority from May 29, 2012 to June 2, 2017.

== Early life ==
Morales grew up in the Washington, D.C. area. His father George, a Mexican immigrant, was an anesthesiologist at the George Washington University Hospital and was part of the trauma team that treated and saved President Ronald Reagan after a 1981 assassination attempt.

After attending Churchill High School in Potomac, Morales enrolled at George Washington University as a biology major. He planned on becoming a marine biologist.

== Career ==
=== Capitol Hill ===
Morales' first job out of college was as an aide to U.S. Senator Frank Lautenberg. He initially focused on environmental issues before becoming a transportation specialist when Lautenberg was named chairman of the Senate transit appropriations subcommittee.

Morales was a key drafter of the Intermodal Surface Transportation Efficiency Act, a bill which first proposed a California high-speed rail corridor connecting San Diego and Los Angeles to the San Francisco Bay Area and Sacramento through the San Joaquin Valley.

In 1993, Morales was appointed as special assistant to Secretary of Transportation Federico Pena. In 1995, Morales began work with Vice President Al Gore's National Performance Task Review. Gore would praise Morales' work two years later when the latter left Washington: "[Jeff] has been an important part of our work to reinvent the federal government". He also served as issues director for the White House Commission on Aviation Safety and Security. He was part of a team that wrote the bill outlawing smoking on planes.

=== Chicago ===
In 1998, Morales moved to Chicago, serving as the executive vice president of management and performance for the Chicago Transit Authority. Shortly after arriving, Morales mandated that CTA employees turn in their company cars and ride public transit to work. During Morales' time with the CTA, the agency experienced its first increase in ridership in 15 years.

=== Caltrans ===
After two years in Chicago, Morales accepted an offer for the position of Director of Caltrans from California Governor Gray Davis. He has been praised for helping turn around the struggling agency, overseeing $10 billion in projects during his time with the department.

It was during this time that FasTrak was installed on the Bay Bridge. Morales resigned upon the election of Arnold Schwarzenegger in 2003.

=== Parsons Brinckerhoff ===
Morales moved to the private sphere after Caltrans, serving as senior vice president for Parsons Brinckerhoff (PB), an international consulting, engineering, and program management company. Some of his key responsibilities included heading PB's Americas projects and managing government relations. Morales was also a key figure in PB's projects with Transport for London. In 2009, Morales was appointed to the Transition Team for then President-Elect Barack Obama.

=== California High Speed Rail Authority ===
On May 29, 2012, Morales was appointed CEO of the California High Speed Rail Authority. Though the Authority had only about a dozen employees in 2012 and many thought the high speed rail project was doomed to failure, the project has made significant advancements under Morales. The Authority started construction on the nation's first high speed rail line in 2014, breaking ground in Fresno.

Morales attended the 2014 United Nations Climate Summit in New York City, participating in a policy room discussion about transportation.

In June 2017, amid cost overruns and scheduling problems, Morales left California High Speed Rail Authority.

=== Honors and awards ===
Morales received the 2015 American Public Transportation Association Award for State Distinguished Service.
