= Intermodal Surface Transportation Efficiency Act =

US federal highway legislation

Intermodal Surface Transportation Efficiency Act of 1991
- Long title: An act to develop a national intermodal surface transportation system, to authorize funds for construction of highways, for highway safety programs, and for mass transit programs, and for other purposes
- Acronyms (colloquial): ISTEA
- Nicknames: Ice Tea
- Enacted by: the 102nd United States Congress

Citations
- Public law: Pub. L. 102–240
- Statutes at Large: 105 Stat. 1914

Codification
- Titles amended: 15 U.S.C.: Commerce and Trade; 23 U.S.C.: Highways; 26 U.S.C.: Internal Revenue Code; 33 U.S.C.: Navigation and Navigable Waters; 49 U.S.C.: Transportation

Legislative history
- Introduced in the House as H.R. 2950 by Norman Mineta (D-CA) on July 18, 1991; Passed the House on October 23, 1991 (343-83); Passed the Senate on October 31, 1991 (unanimous consent, in lieu of S. 1204 passed June 19, 1991 91-7); Reported by the joint conference committee on November 27, 1991; agreed to by the House on November 27, 1991 (372-47) and by the Senate on November 27, 1991 (79-8); Signed into law by President George H. W. Bush on December 18, 1991

Major amendments
- I-27 Numbering Act of 2023

The Intermodal Surface Transportation Efficiency Act of 1991 (ISTEA, /aɪsˈti/) is a United States federal law that posed a major change to transportation planning and policy, as the first U.S. federal legislation on the subject in the post-Interstate Highway System era.

The act was signed into law on December 18, 1991, by President George H. W. Bush and codified as Pub. L. 102–240 and 105 Stat. 1914.

== Objective ==
The act presented an overall intermodal approach to highway and transit funding with collaborative planning requirements, giving significant additional powers to metropolitan planning organizations (MPOs).

ISTEA also provided funds for the conversion of dormant railroad corridors into rail trails; the first rail trail to be funded was the Cedar Lake Regional Rail Trail, in Minneapolis, Minnesota.

The bill was preceded by the Surface Transportation and Uniform Relocation Assistance Act in 1987 and followed by the Transportation Equity Act for the 21st Century (TEA-21) in 1998, the Safe, Accountable, Flexible, Efficient Transportation Equity Act: A Legacy for Users (SAFETEA-LU) in 2005, the Moving Ahead for Progress in the 21st Century Act (MAP-21) in 2012, the Fixing America's Surface Transportation Act (FAST) in 2015, and the Infrastructure Investment and Jobs Act in 2021.

== High priority corridors ==
Section 1105 of the act also defines a number of High Priority Corridors, to be part of the National Highway System. (Note: Section 1105 did not amend the U.S. Code, nor is it editorially classified as part of the U.S. Code, or set out as a statutory note to a section of the U.S. Code. However, an up-to-date version of ISTEA as amended can be found at govinfo.gov) After various amendments in subsequent transportation bills and other legislation, this is a list of the corridors:

List of High Priority Corridors
Corridor #	Name	Location	Notes
1	North-South Corridor	Kansas City, Missouri to Shreveport, Louisiana	Interstate 49
2	Avenue of the Saints Corridor	St. Louis, Missouri to St. Paul, Minnesota	
3	East-West Transamerica Corridor	Hampton Roads, Virginia to southern Kansas	Interstate 66 (Kansas–Kentucky); Project officially cancelled on August 6, 2015
4	Hoosier Heartland Industrial Corridor	Lafayette, Indiana to Toledo, Ohio	
5	I-73/74 North-South Corridor	Myrtle Beach, South Carolina to Cincinnati, Ohio, Detroit, Michigan and Sault Ste. Marie, Michigan	
6	United States Route 80 Corridor	Meridian, Mississippi to Savannah, Georgia	
7	East-West Corridor	Memphis, Tennessee to Atlanta, Georgia and Chattanooga, Tennessee	Partially complete. Interstate 565 from Decatur, Alabama to Huntsville, Alabama.
8	Highway 412 East-West Corridor	Tulsa, Oklahoma to Nashville, Tennessee	
9	United States Route 220 and the Appalachian Thruway Corridor	Bedford, Pennsylvania to Corning, New York	Interstate 99
10	Appalachian Regional Corridor X	Fulton, Mississippi to Birmingham, Alabama	See corridor 45
11	Appalachian Regional Corridor V	From Interstate 55 in northern Mississippi in the west to Interstate 24 in East Tennessee	Route is from Batesville, Mississippi, and via Tupelo, Mississippi, Russellville, Alabama, and Huntsville, Alabama, ending just west of Chattanooga, Tennessee See also corridor 42.
12	United States Route 25E Corridor	Corbin, Kentucky to Morristown, Tennessee	
13	Raleigh-Norfolk Corridor	Raleigh, North Carolina to Norfolk, Virginia	Interstate 87 (North Carolina–Virginia)
14	Heartland Expressway	Denver, Colorado to Rapid City, South Dakota	
15	Urban Highway Corridor	M-59 in Michigan	
16	Economic Lifeline Corridor	I-15 and I-40 in California, Arizona, and Nevada	
17	Route 29 Corridor	Greensboro, North Carolina to Washington, D.C.	
18		Port Huron, Michigan to Chicago, Illinois, Corpus Christi, Texas and Victoria, Texas	Interstate 69 (see Corridor 20)
19	United States Route 395 Corridor	Canada–US border to Reno, Nevada	
20	United States Route 59 Corridor	Laredo, Texas to Texarkana, Texas	Interstate 69 (see Corridor 18)
21	United States Route 219 Corridor	Buffalo, New York to Interstate 80	
22	Alameda Transportation Corridor	Ports of Los Angeles and Long Beach to Interstate 10	(See Corridor 34)
23	Interstate Route 35 Corridor	Laredo, Texas to Duluth, Minnesota and the Canada–US border (via Interstate 29)	
24	Dalton Highway	Deadhorse, Alaska to Fairbanks, Alaska	
25	State Route 168 (South Battlefield Boulevard)	Great Bridge, Virginia Bypass to the North Carolina state line	
26	CANAMEX Corridor	Nogales, Arizona to the Canada–US border	Interstate 11 and Interstate 15
27	Camino Real Corridor	El Paso, Texas to the Canada–US border	
28	Birmingham Northern Beltline	Birmingham, Alabama	Appalachian Highway Development System Corridor X-1
29	Coalfields Expressway	Beckley, West Virginia to Pound, Virginia	
30	Interstate Route 5	California, Oregon and Washington	
31	Mon–Fayette Expressway and Southern Beltway	Pennsylvania and West Virginia	
32	Wisconsin Development Corridor	Dubuque, Iowa to Eau Claire, Wisconsin	Consists of three different corridors in the state of Wisconsin
33	Capital Gateway Corridor	Washington, D.C. to the Baltimore-Washington Parkway in Maryland	U.S. Route 50
34	Alameda Corridor-East and Southwest Passage	East Los Angeles, California to Barstow, California and Coachella, California, and San Bernardino, California to Arizona	(See Corridor 22)
35	Everett-Tacoma FAST Corridor	Everett, Washington to Tacoma, Washington	
36	NY-17	Harriman, New York to I-90 in Pennsylvania	ISTEA mandates that route be Interstate 86
37	United States Route 90	Lafayette, Louisiana to New Orleans, Louisiana	Interstate 49
38	Ports-to-Plains Corridor	Laredo, Texas to Denver, Colorado	Interstate 27 (Lubbock, Texas to Amarillo, Texas)
39	United States Route 63	Marked Tree, Arkansas to Interstate 55	Interstate 555
40	Greensboro Corridor	Danville, Virginia to Greensboro, North Carolina	Interstate 785
41	Falls-to-Falls Corridor	International Falls, Minnesota to Chippewa Falls, Wisconsin	
42		Batesville to Fulton, Mississippi	formed from portions of ADHS corridors V and X; law designates highway as a future Interstate highway (route number not specified in law)
43	United States Route 95 Corridor	Eastport, Idaho to Oregon	
44	Louisiana Highway 1 Corridor	Grand Isle, Louisiana to U.S. Route 90	
45	United States Route 78 Corridor	Memphis, Tennessee to Birmingham, Alabama	Interstate 22
46	Interstate Route 710	Long Beach, California to California State Route 60	
47	Interstate Route 87	Quebec to New York City	
48	Route 50 High Plains Corridor	Newton, Kansas to Pueblo, Colorado	
49	Atlantic Commerce Corridor	Jacksonville, Florida to Miami, Florida	
50	East-West Corridor	Watertown, New York to Calais, Maine	
51	SPIRIT Corridor	El Paso, Texas to Wichita, Kansas	
52		Swifton, Arkansas to Jonesboro, Arkansas	
53	United States Highway Route 6	Interstate 70 to Interstate 15	
54	California Farm-to-Market Corridor	south of Bakersfield, California to Sacramento, California	California State Route 99
55		Dallas, Texas to Memphis, Tennessee	
56	La Entrada al Pacifico Corridor	Lamesa, Texas to Presidio, Texas	
57	United States Route 41 corridor	Milwaukee, Wisconsin to Green Bay, Wisconsin	Interstate 41
58	Theodore Roosevelt Expressway	Rapid City, South Dakota to Raymond, Montana	
59	Central North American Trade Corridor	border between North Dakota and South Dakota to the Canada–US border	
60	Providence Beltline Corridor	Hope Valley, Rhode Island to Massachusetts	
61		various corridors in Missouri	
62	Georgia Developmental Highway System Corridors	various corridors in Georgia	
63	Liberty Corridor	various corridors in northern New Jersey	
64		various corridors in southern New Jersey	
65	Interstate Route 95 Corridor	Connecticut	
66	Interstate Route 91 Corridor	Connecticut	
67	Fairbanks-Yukon International Corridor	Canada–US border to Fairbanks, Alaska	
68	Intermountain West Corridor and Washoe County Corridor	Las Vegas, Nevada to Reno, Nevada	Interstate 11 and Interstate 80
69	Cross Valley Connector	Interstate 5 to State Route 14, Santa Clarita Valley, California	
70	Economic Lifeline corridor	I-15, I-40 and other roads in California, Arizona and Nevada	
71	High Desert Corridor	Los Angeles, California to Las Vegas, Nevada	Brightline West via Interstate 15
72	North-South corridor	Kansas City, Missouri to Shreveport, Louisiana	Interstate 49
73	Louisiana Highway corridor	Grand Isle, Louisiana to U.S. Route 90	
74		Lafayette, Louisiana to New Orleans, Louisiana	Interstate 49
75	Louisiana 28 corridor	Fort Polk, Louisiana to Alexandria, Louisiana	
76		Toledo, Ohio to Cincinnati, Ohio	
77		Indiana to Toledo, Ohio	
78		Cincinnati, Ohio to Cleveland, Ohio	
79	Interstate Route 376	Monroeville, Pennsylvania to Sharon, Pennsylvania	
80	Intercounty Connector	Interstate 270 to Interstate 95/U.S. Route 1 in Maryland	
81	Interstate 795	Goldsboro, North Carolina to Interstate 40 west of Faison, North Carolina	
82	U.S. Route 70	U.S. 70 from Interstate 40 at Garner, North Carolina to the port of Morehead City, North Carolina	law designates highway as a future Interstate highway (route number not specified in law). Assigned Interstate 42 by AASHTO
83	Sonoran Corridor (State Rte. 410)	A new highway from Interstate 19 to Interstate 10 south of Tucson International Airport, Arizona	law designates highway as a future Interstate highway (route number not specified in law)
84	Central Texas Corridor	Two routes from Interstate 10 (Pecos County) and Interstate 20 (Midland–Odessa), joining in Brady and continuing east to the Sabine River, passing in or near Fort Hood; College Station; Huntsville; and Livingston; all in Texas (paragraphs A–C) Also designates spurs from I-14 North in Eden to I-10 near Junction following U.S. 83 (paragraph D), from I-14 in Woodville to I-10 in Beaumont via U.S. 69 (paragraph E), from I-14 in Jasper to I-10 in Beaumont via U.S. 96 (paragraph F), and from I-20 in Odessa to I-10 in Pecos County via U.S. 385, RM 305, and U.S. 190 (paragraph G).	FAST mandates that route be Interstate 14; IIJA designates Bryan–College Station loop as Interstate 214, the spur from Brady to I-10 as Interstate 14 South, and the spur from Brady to I-20 as Interstate 14 North. Routes in paragraphs D–G are designated as future Interstate highways (route number not specified in law) See also corridors 93 and 99–102
85	Interstate 81	From Interstate 86 to the Canada–United States border	
86	Interstate 70 from Salt Lake City, Utah to Denver, Colorado (Note: I-70 does not come near Salt Lake City; instead terminating 173 miles (278 km) south of such city at I-15. Regardless, the law states "Interstate Route 70 from Denver, Colorado, to Salt Lake City, Utah")	Utah and Colorado	
87	Newberg-Dundee Bypass route	From Newberg, Oregon to Dayton, Oregon (Note: The law's text states, "The Oregon 99W Newberg-Dundee Bypass Route between Newberg, Oregon and Dayton, Oregon;". The actual route is Oregon Route 18, which acts as an eastern bypass of Oregon Rte. 99W. The southern portion, Phase 1, between Rte. 99W at Dundee and Rte. 219 is finished. Improvements to the intersection of Rte. 219 and 18 are currently under construction as Phase 2A. Sufficient funding for the northern portion, Phase 2B, which is from Rte. 219 to Rte. 99W, has not yet been identified.)	
88	Interstate 205	Interstate 205 in Oregon	
89	I-57 Corridor Extension	Extending Interstate 57 from its southern terminus at I-55 in southeastern Missouri to I-40 in North Little Rock, Arkansas	ISTEA mandates that route be Interstate 57
90	Pennyrile Parkway	From Interstate 69 near Nortonville, Kentucky in the north, to Interstate 24 south of Hopkinsville, Kentucky	ISTEA mandates that route be Interstate 169
91	Western Kentucky Parkway	The portion of the Western Kentucky Parkway between Interstate 69 in the west (near Nortonville, Kentucky) to Interstate 165 (formerly the William H. Natcher Parkway) in the east	ISTEA mandates that route be Interstate 569
92		U.S. 421 from I-85 in Greensboro to I-95 in Dunn, North Carolina	IIJA designates as future Interstate highway (route number not specified in law)
93	South Mississippi Corridor	U.S. 84 from Natchez to Laurel, Mississippi, I-59 from Laurel to Hattiesburg, Mississippi, and U.S. 49 and MS 601 from Hattiesburg to Gulfport, Mississippi	Largely identical to Central Mississippi Corridor (Corridor 100). IIJA designates the U.S. 84 and I-59 portions as a future Interstate highway (indirectly mandating it to be I-14); see also Corridor 94
94	Kosciusko to Gulf Coast Corridor	Starting at I-55 near Vaiden, Mississippi, running south and passing east of the vicinity of the Jackson Urbanized Area, connecting to U.S. 49 north of Hattiesburg, Mississippi, and generally following U.S. 49 to I-10 near Gulfport, Mississippi.	Overlaps with corridors 93 and 100 south of Hattiesburg; IIJA designates as future Interstate highway (route number not specified in law)
95	Interstate 22 Spur	U.S. 45 from I-22 in Tupelo south to near Shannon, Mississippi.	IIJA designates as future Interstate highway (route number not specified in law)
96		U.S. 412 from I-35 in Noble County, Oklahoma via Tulsa, to its intersection with I-49 in Springdale, Arkansas	IIJA designates as future Interstate highway (route number not specified in law; subsequently designated as Interstate 42)
97	Louie B. Nunn Cumberland Expressway (sic)	Cumberland Parkway from I-65 in Barren County to U.S. 27 in Somerset, Kentucky	Part of the cancelled East-West Transamerica Corridor route (Corridor 3); IIJA mandates this route be Interstate 365
98		MS 7 from I-55 in Grenada via Oxford to I-22 in Holly Springs, Mississippi	
99	Central Louisiana Corridor	From the Sabine River, follows LA 8 and LA 28 to Alexandria, continuing east to join U.S. 84 and cross the Mississippi River near Natchez, Mississippi	IIJA mandates this route be Interstate 14 See corridors 84, 93, and 100–102
100	Central Mississippi Corridor	U.S. 84 east from Natchez to Laurel, Mississippi, then follows I-59 northeast through Meridian to the Mississippi–Alabama state line near Cuba, Alabama; also includes a spur following I-59 south to Hattiesburg, then U.S. 49 and proposed MS 601 to Gulfport	IIJA mandates the route from Natchez to the Alabama state line be Interstate 14 See corridors 84, 93, 99, and 101–102
101	Middle Alabama Corridor	U.S. 80 east from I-20/59 near Cuba to Montgomery, then follows the partially-completed Montgomery Outer Loop (AL 108) to I-85, continuing east from Tuskegee via either U.S. 80 or I-85 and U.S. 280 to the Alabama–Georgia border in Phenix City	IIJA mandates this route be Interstate 14 See corridors 84, 93, 99–100, and 102
102	Middle Georgia Corridor	Fall Line Freeway (GA 540) from Columbus via Warner Robins and Macon to Augusta, Georgia	IIJA mandates this route be Interstate 14 See corridors 84, 93, and 99–101

== High-speed rail corridors ==
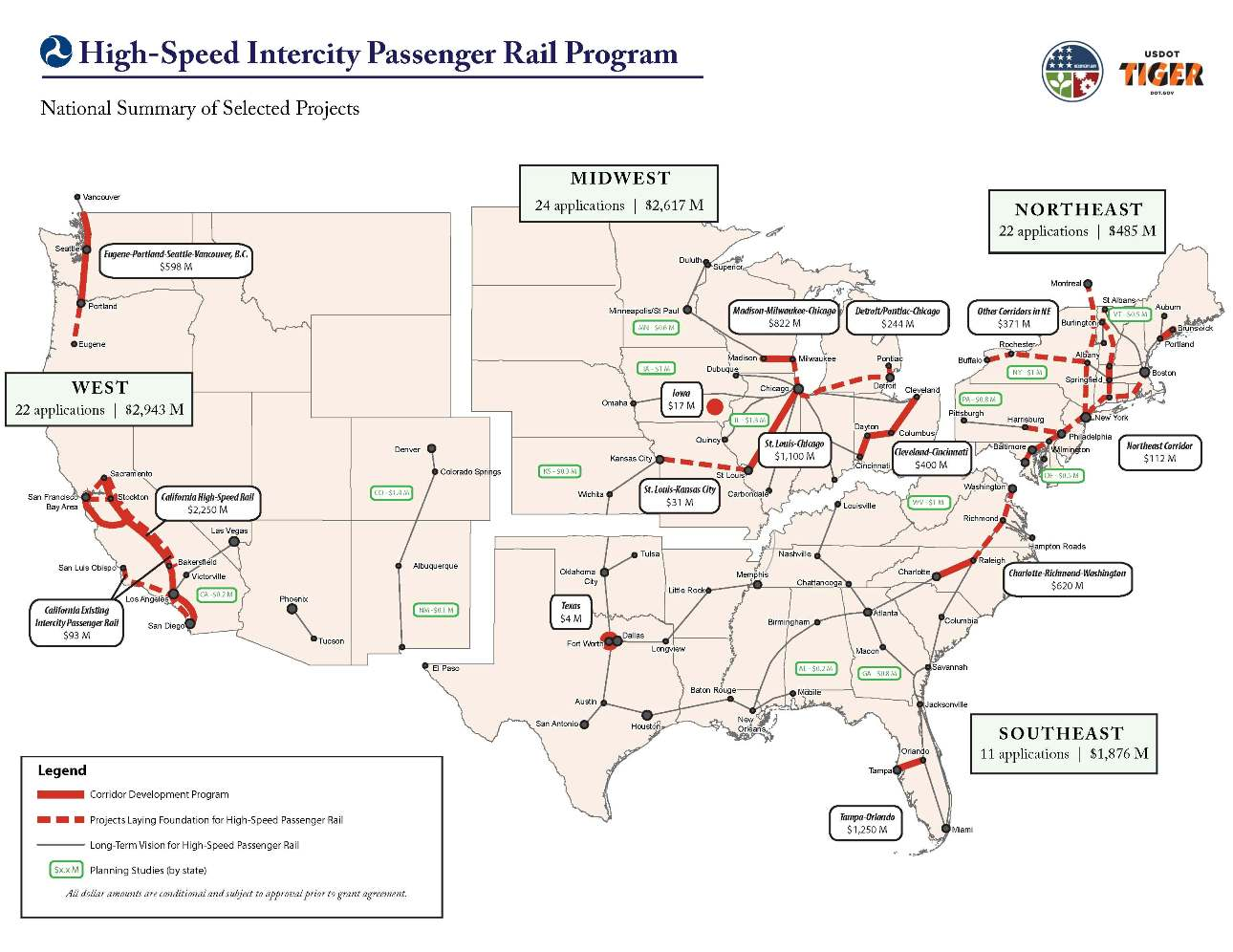
The high-speed corridors designated under ISTEA closely correspond with grants given under the American Recovery and Reinvestment Act—seventeen years later.

The legislation also called for the designation of up to five high-speed rail corridors. The options were studied for several months, and announced in October 1992. The first four were announced by United States Secretary of Transportation Andrew Card, while the last was announced by Federal Railroad Administration head Gil Carmichael.

- October 15, 1992: The Midwest high-speed rail corridor with three links from Chicago, Illinois to Detroit, Michigan, St. Louis, Missouri, and Milwaukee, Wisconsin.
- October 16, 1992: The Florida high-speed rail corridor linking Miami with Orlando and Tampa.
- October 19, 1992: The California high-speed rail corridor linking San Diego and Los Angeles with the San Francisco Bay Area and Sacramento via the San Joaquin Valley.
- October 20, 1992: The Southeast high-speed rail corridor connecting Charlotte, North Carolina, Richmond, Virginia, and Washington, D.C.
- October 20, 1992: The Pacific Northwest high-speed rail corridor linking Eugene and Portland, Oregon with Seattle, Washington and Vancouver, British Columbia, Canada.

There was not significant funding attached to these announcements: $30 million had been allocated to several states by 1997 to improve grade crossings, but that was a very tiny amount in comparison to the billions required for a true high-speed network. Aside from a few places in California and the Chicago–Detroit Line, most areas outside the Northeast Corridor continued to be limited to 79 mph (127 km/h) until $8 billion from the American Recovery and Reinvestment Act of 2009 was distributed in January 2010.

Jeff Morales one of the principal drafters of this bill, served as CEO of the California High-Speed Rail Authority, which is currently constructing a high-speed rail line along the route originally proposed in this bill, from 2012 to 2017.

== Airbags ==
The Intermodal Surface Transportation Efficiency Act of 1991 also mandated that passenger automobiles and light trucks built after September 1, 1998, to have airbags installed as standard equipment for the driver and the right front passenger.
