= National Mass Transportation Assistance Act =

National Mass Transportation Assistance Act of 1974
- Long title: An Act to amend the Urban Mass Transportation Act of 1964 to provide increased assistance for mass transportation systems.
- Enacted by: the 93rd United States Congress

Citations
- Public law: Pub. L. 93-503
- Statutes at Large: 88 Stat. 1565

Legislative history
- Introduced in the Senate as S. 386 by Harrison A. Williams on January 16, 1973; Signed into law by President Gerald Ford on November 26, 1974

The National Mass Transportation Assistance Act of 1974 is a United States federal law signed into law by President Gerald Ford on November 26, 1974 that extended the Urban Mass Transportation Act to cover operating costs as well as construction costs. This act was the culmination of a major lobbying effort by the transit industry and urban interests to secure federal operating assistance for transit.

== See also ==
- Urban Mass Transportation Act of 1964
- Urban Mass Transportation Act of 1970
