= Surface Transportation Assistance Act (1978) =

Surface Transportation Assistance Act of 1978
- Long title: A bill to authorize appropriations for the construction of certain highways in accordance with title 23 of the United States Code, for highway safety, for mass transportation in urban and in rural areas, and for other purposes.
- Acronyms (colloquial): STAA
- Enacted by: the 95th United States Congress

Citations
- Public law: Pub. L. 95–599
- Statutes at Large: 92 Stat. 2689

Codification
- Titles amended: 23 U.S.C.: Highways

Legislative history
- Introduced in the House as H.R. 11733 by James J. Howard (D-NJ) on March 22, 1978; Passed the House on September 28, 1978 (367–28); Passed the Senate on October 3, 1978 (unanimous consent); Reported by the joint conference committee on October 14, 1978; agreed to by the House on October 14, 1978 and by the Senate on October 14, 1978; Signed into law by President Jimmy Carter on November 6, 1978

The Surface Transportation Assistance Act of 1978 (Pub. L. 95–599, Pub. L. 92–2689) is a transportation funding and policy Act of the United States Congress. The act was the first federal act to combine funding for highways and public transportation in the same bill. This set the precedent for every surface transportation reauthorization bill that has followed (as of 2026).
