= Federal-Aid Highway Act of 1956 =

1956 U.S. legislation creating the Interstate Highway System

- Other short titles: Highway Construction Act; National Interstate and Defense Highways Act
- Long title: An act to amend and supplement the Federal Aid Road Act approved July 11, 1916, to authorize appropriations for continuing the construction of highways; to amend the Internal Revenue Code of 1954 to provide additional revenue from taxes on motor fuel, tires, and trucks and buses; and for other purposes.
- Acronyms (colloquial): FAHA
- Nicknames: Highway Revenue Act of 1956
- Enacted by: the 84th United States Congress
- Effective: June 29, 1956

Citations
- Public law: 84-627
- Statutes at Large: 70 Stat. 374

Codification
- Titles amended: 16 U.S.C.: Conservation; 23 U.S.C.: Highways
- U.S.C. sections created: 16 U.S.C. ch. 2, subch. I § 503; 23 U.S.C. ch. 1

Legislative history
- Introduced in the House as H.R. 10660 by George Fallon (D–MD) on April 19, 1956; Passed the House on April 27, 1956 (388–19); Passed the Senate on May 29, 1956 (41–39); Reported by the joint conference committee on June 22, 1956; agreed to by the House on June 22, 1956 (adopted) and by the Senate on June 22, 1956 (89–1); Signed into law by President Dwight D. Eisenhower on June 29, 1956

The Federal-Aid Highway Act of 1956, also known as the National Interstate and Defense Highways Act, Pub. L. 84–627 was enacted on June 29, 1956, when President Dwight D. Eisenhower signed the bill into law. With an original authorization of $25 billion (equivalent to $226 billion in 2025) for the construction of 41,000 miles (66,000 km) of the Interstate Highway System over a 10-year period, it was the largest public works project in American history through that time.

The addition of the term defense in the act's title was because some of the original cost was diverted from defense funds and "because of [the Interstate Highway System']s primary importance to the national defense".

The money for the Interstate Highway and Defense Highways was handled in a Highway Trust Fund that paid for 90 percent of highway construction costs with the states required to pay the remaining 10 percent. It was expected that the money would be generated through new taxes on fuel, automobiles, trucks, and tires. As a matter of practice, the federal portion of the cost of the Interstate Highway System has been paid for by taxes on gasoline and diesel fuel.

== History ==
Some biographers have claimed that Eisenhower's support of the Federal-Aid Highway Act of 1956 can be attributed to his experiences in 1919 as a participant in the U.S. Army's first Transcontinental Motor Convoy across the United States on the historic Lincoln Highway, which was the first road across America. However, there is little evidence in either his private or public utterances from the time (1952–1956) to support this claim. The highly publicized 1919 convoy was intended, in part, to dramatize the need for better main highways and continued federal aid. The convoy left the Ellipse south of the White House in Washington, D.C., on July 7, 1919, and headed for Gettysburg, Pennsylvania. From there, it followed the Lincoln Highway to San Francisco. Bridges cracked and were rebuilt, vehicles became stuck in mud and equipment broke, but the convoy was greeted warmly by communities across the country. The convoy reached San Francisco on September 6, 1919.

The convoy was memorable enough for a young Army officer, 28-year-old Lieutenant Colonel Dwight David Eisenhower, to include a chapter about the trip, titled "Through Darkest America With Truck and Tank", in his book At Ease: Stories I Tell to Friends (Doubleday and Company, Inc., 1967). "The trip had been difficult, tiring and fun", he said. That experience on the Lincoln Highway, plus his observations of the German Autobahn network during World War II, may have convinced him to support construction of the Interstate System when he became president. "The old convoy had started me thinking about good, two-lane highways, but Germany had made me see the wisdom of broader ribbons across the land." His "Grand Plan" for highways, announced in 1954, led to the 1956 legislative breakthrough that created the Highway Trust Fund to accelerate construction of the Interstate System.

Though Eisenhower is sometimes described as having advocated for the highways for the purpose of national defense, scholarship has shown that he said relatively little about national defense when actually advocating for the plan, instead emphasizing highway fatalities and the importance of transportation for the national economy. In the event of a ground invasion by a foreign power, the U.S. Army would need good highways to be able to transport troops and material across the country efficiently. Following the completion of the highways, the cross-country journey that took the convoy two months in 1919 was cut down to five days.

Eisenhower's role in the passage of the 1956 Federal-Aid Act has been exaggerated. Eisenhower's preferred bill, authored by a group of non-governmental officials led by Gen. Lucius Clay, was voted down overwhelmingly by Congress in 1955. The bill Eisenhower actually signed in 1956 was the brainchild of Congressional Democrats, in particular Albert Gore Sr., George Fallon, Dennis Chavez, and Hale Boggs. That bill authorized paying for highway expansion by establishing the Highway Trust Fund, which in turn would be funded by increases in highway user taxes on gasoline, diesel, tires, and other materials. For his part, during 1954–1955, Eisenhower had adamantly refused to support a highway bill that either raised user taxes or increased deficit spending, instead favoring a plan that would create a government corporation that would issue highway bonds. However, Congressional Democrats and members of his own administration, including his Comptroller General Joseph Campbell, publicly criticized Eisenhower's proposed government corporation because its bonds would, in fact, count towards the national debt.

== Tollways ==
Many limited-access toll highways that had been built before the Interstate Highway Act were incorporated into the Interstate system (for example, the Ohio Turnpike carries portions of Interstate 76 (I-76), I-80, and I-90). For major turnpikes in New York, New Jersey, Pennsylvania, Ohio, Indiana, Illinois, Kansas, Oklahoma, Massachusetts, New Hampshire, Maine, and West Virginia, tolls continue to be collected, even though the turnpikes have long since been paid for. The money collected is used for highway maintenance, turnpike improvement projects, and states' general funds. (That is not the case in Massachusetts, where the state constitution requires the money be used for transportation.) In addition, there are several major toll bridges and toll tunnels included in the Interstate system, including four bridges in the San Francisco Bay Area, ones linking Delaware with New Jersey, New Jersey with New York, New Jersey with Pennsylvania, the Upper and Lower peninsulas of Michigan, and Indiana and Kentucky in the Louisville area. Tolls collected on Interstate Highways remain on segments of I-95, I-94, I-90, I-88, I-87, I-80, I-77, I-76, I-70, I-64, I-44, I-35, I-294, I-355, and several others.

In addition, some states have built tolled express lanes within existing freeways.

Toll turnpikes in the following states have been declared paid off, and those highways have become standard freeways with the removal of tolls: Connecticut (I-95), Kentucky (part of I-65), Maryland (part of I-95), Texas (part of I-30), Virginia (the part of I-95 between Richmond and Petersburg). Additionally, Kentucky has several former toll roads that, in full or part, became part of the Interstate Highway system after the removal of tolls (parts of I-69, I-165, and I-169, with I-69 Spur and I-369 following in the near future).
