= Fixing America's Surface Transportation Act =

2015 U.S. federal funding and authorization act

- Long title: An act to authorize funds for Federal-aid highways, highway safety programs, and transit programs, and for other purposes
- Acronyms (colloquial): FAST Act
- Enacted by: the 114th United States Congress
- Effective: December 4, 2015

Citations
- Public law: Pub. L. 114–94 (text) (PDF)
- Statutes at Large: 129 Stat. 1312

Codification
- Acts amended: Securities Act of 1933
- Titles amended: 23 U.S.C.: Highways

Legislative history
- Introduced in the House as "Hire More Heroes Act of 2015" (22) by Rodney Davis (R–IL) on January 6, 2015; Passed the House on January 6, 2015 (unanimous consent, 412-0); Passed the Senate on July 30, 2015 (65-34); Reported by the joint conference committee on December 3, 2015; agreed to by the House on December 3, 2015 (359-65) and by the Senate on December 3, 2015 (83-16); Signed into law by President Barack Obama on December 4, 2015

The Fixing America's Surface Transportation Act, or the FAST Act, is a funding and authorization bill to govern United States federal surface transportation spending. It was passed by Congress on December 3, 2015, and President Barack Obama signed it on the following day. The vote was 359–65 in the House and 83–16 in the Senate.

== History ==
The bill was introduced to the House by Rodney Davis (R‑IL) as the "Hire More Heroes Act of 2015" on January 6, 2015. The $305 billion, five-year bill is funded without increasing transportation user fees. (The federal gas tax was last raised in 1993.) Instead, funds were generated through changes to passport rules, Federal Reserve Bank dividends, and privatized tax collection.

In Section 6021, Congress asked the Transportation Research Board (TRB) to conduct a study of the actions needed to upgrade and restore the Interstate Highway System to fulfill its role as a crucial national asset, serving the needs of people, cities and towns, businesses, and the military while remaining the safest highway network in the country. The subsequent 2019 report, "Renewing the National Commitment to the Interstate Highway System: A Foundation for the Future," recommended actions Congress could take.

== Transportation provisions ==
The Act requires a reanalysis of the costs and benefits of electronically controlled pneumatic brakes.

The Act creates the Federal Permitting Improvement Steering Council to speed up permitting of key infrastructure projects, particularly in transportation.

== Unrelated provisions ==
- This law authorizes the Export–Import Bank of the United States through 2019.
- New crop insurance funding is approved.
- Emigrant Savings Bank would have been exempted from certain provisions of the Dodd–Frank Wall Street Reform and Consumer Protection Act. This was not included in the final bill that was passed into law.
- The Act also includes several revisions to federal securities law, including Section 76001 of the Act. This provision creates a new Section 4(a)(7) of the Securities Act of 1933, a new exemption from registration under that act intended to facilitate secondary trading of private company securities among accredited investors. By doing so, Congress and the President hoped to support smaller, nonpublic companies with their capital raising efforts by providing more liquidity for their securities, with reduced regulatory burdens.

== FAST-41 ==
Title 41 of the FAST Act (FAST-41) created the Federal Permitting Improvement Steering Council (FPISC) to streamline the federal review and approval process for federal infrastructure projects.

In April 2025, the Second Trump administration granted the FAST-41 Transparency Project status to ten mineral projects, allowing for expedited permitting to support U.S. critical minerals production. The progress of these projects is publicly available.

The Biden administration had previously fast-tracked the first mineral project under FAST-41, a zinc-manganese underground mine being developed by South32.
