= United States critical materials list =

The United States critical materials list is a designation of materials or minerals considered essential for the economic or national security of the United States, where there is a high risk of supply chain disruption. This list is established under the authority of the Energy Act of 2020, specifically Section 7002(a), which empowers the Secretary of Energy, in collaboration with the Secretary of the Interior, to identify critical materials.

In the U.S., critical minerals that are at risk of shortage or supply chain disruption are assessed by the United States Geological Survey under the Secretary of the Interior and by the National Science and Technology Council.

The Defense Logistics Agency (DLA), part of the U.S. Department of Defense, is the primary agency responsible for analyzing, planning, procuring, and managing materials that are critical to national security.

== 2023 Final Critical Materials List ==
The "Final 2023 Critical Materials List" was determined by the United States Department of Energy (DOE), with the Undersecretary for Science and Innovation involvement. This list incorporates materials deemed critical for energy applications and minerals from the 2022 final list designated by the Department of the Interior through the United States Geological Survey (USGS).

=== Critical Materials for Energy ("The Electric Eighteen") ===
The following materials were identified as critical for energy technology:

- Aluminum
- Cobalt
- Copper
- Dysprosium
- Electrical steel
- Fluorine
- Gallium
- Iridium
- Lithium
- Magnesium
- Natural graphite
- Neodymium
- Nickel
- Platinum
- Praseodymium
- Silicon
- Silicon carbide
- Terbium

=== Critical Minerals ===
The 2022 list from the Department of the Interior includes the following minerals:

- Aluminum
- Antimony
- Arsenic
- Barite
- Beryllium
- Bismuth
- Cerium
- Cesium
- Chromium
- Cobalt
- Dysprosium
- Erbium
- Europium
- Fluorspar
- Gadolinium
- Gallium
- Germanium
- Graphite
- Hafnium
- Holmium
- Indium
- Iridium
- Lanthanum
- Lithium
- Lutetium
- Magnesium
- Manganese
- Neodymium
- Nickel
- Niobium
- Palladium
- Platinum
- Praseodymium
- Rhodium
- Rubidium
- Ruthenium
- Samarium
- Scandium
- Tantalum
- Tellurium
- Terbium
- Thulium
- Tin
- Titanium
- Tungsten
- Vanadium
- Ytterbium
- Yttrium
- Zinc
- Zirconium

=== Basis for listing ===
This designation is based on the DOE's 2023 Critical Materials Assessment, which evaluates materials for their criticality to global clean energy technology supply chains. Materials are considered "critical" or "near critical" based on their importance in energy technologies and potential supply risks. Notably, uranium is excluded from this list as per Section 7002(a) of the Energy Act of 2020, which restricts the list to non-fuel materials, as uranium is classified as a fuel material when used in commercial nuclear reactors.

== 2025 Designation of critical minerals ==
In April 2025, the Federal government declared domestic mineral production a national-security/economic-security priority and designated a number of projects as "Priority Critical Mineral Projects", including the South West Arkansas Project for lithium mineral extraction.

In November 2025, the Department of the Interior released the final 2025 List of Critical Minerals assessed by the U.S. Geological Survey. It included ten new minerals—boron, copper, lead, metallurgical coal, phosphate, potash, rhenium, silicon, silver, and uranium. The update of the list also reflects the broader minerals strategy to reduce reliance on imports from countries such as China.

By May 2026, 17 critical mineral projects had completed Federal permitting during the Trump administration since the 2025 accelerated process began.

== See also ==
- Critical raw materials
- Energy policy of the United States
- US critical minerals deal with Australia
- U.S. Department of Energy
- U.S. Geological Survey
