= Urban Mass Transportation Act of 1964 =

- Long title: An Act to authorize the Housing and Home Finance Administrator to provide additional assistance for the development of comprehensive and coordinated mass transportation systems, both public and private, in metropolitan and other urban areas, and for other purposes
- Enacted by: the 88th United States Congress
- Effective: July 9, 1964

Citations
- Public law: 88-365
- Statutes at Large: 78 Stat. 302 through 78 Stat. 308

Legislative history
- Introduced in the Senate as S. 6 on January 14, 1963; Passed the Senate on April 4, 1963 (52–41); Passed the House as the 212-189 on June 25, 1964; Signed into law by President Lyndon B. Johnson on July 9, 1964

The Urban Mass Transportation Act of 1964 provided $375 million for large-scale urban public or private rail projects in the form of matching funds to cities and states. The Urban Mass Transportation Administration (now the Federal Transit Administration) was created. It provided capital grants for up to 50% of the cost of transit improvements. It was the first major federal involvement in public transportation.

Like the earlier Buy American Act of 1933, and the later "Buy America" section of the Surface Transportation Assistance Act of 1982, the act contained a provision to encourage U.S. government funds to be spent on U.S.-made products.

== See also ==
- Urban Mass Transportation Act of 1970
- National Mass Transportation Assistance Act of 1974
