= Urban Mass Transportation Act of 1970 =

The Urban Mass Transportation Act of 1970 (Pub. L. 91–453) added to the Urban Mass Transportation Act of 1964 by authorizing an additional $12 billion of the same type of matching funds.

Earlier legislative attempts at establishing a federal transit funding program were opposed by labor unions because they did not protect unionized workers, and thus failed to gain sufficient support in Congress. The unions feared that public entities would take over failing privately held transportation companies and cease to recognize the union (the National Labor Relations Act does not apply to public employers).

The version that finally did pass included provisions that require public entities receiving federal transit money to enter into protective agreements (often referred to as "Section 13(c) agreements") that would be approved by the Department of Labor. The Secretary of Labor must certify that the transit authority has made a "fair and equitable" labor protective arrangement before the authority can receive assistance.

Although the Federal Government is prohibited from dictating labor standards of public employees directly (see, e.g., National League of Cities v. Usery), it can use the power of the purse and refuse to grant funds to states who don't enter into these protective arrangements.

Appropriations were originally for $3.1 billion (a huge sum for the time), over a 5-year period. With matching funds and loans, it added up to $12 billion.

== See also ==
- National Mass Transportation Assistance Act of 1974
