= Title 23 of the United States Code =

U.S. federal statutes on highways

Title 23 of the United States Code is a positive law title of the United States Code with the heading "Highways."

- 23 U.S.C. ch. 1—Federal-Aid Highways
- 23 U.S.C. ch. 2—Other Highways
- 23 U.S.C. ch. 3—General Provisions
- 23 U.S.C. ch. 4—Highway Safety
- 23 U.S.C. ch. 5—Research And Technology

== See also ==
- Title 23 of the Code of Federal Regulations
