= Surface Transportation and Uniform Relocation Assistance Act =

Federal highway legislation

Surface Transportation and Uniform Relocation Assistance Act of 1987
- Long title: An act to authorize funds for construction of highways, for highway safety programs, and for mass transportation programs, to expand and improve the relocation assistance program, and for other purposes
- Acronyms (colloquial): STURAA
- Enacted by: the 100th United States Congress

Citations
- Public law: Pub. L. 100–17
- Statutes at Large: 100 Stat. 132

Codification
- Titles amended: 23, 26, 42, 49
- U.S.C. sections amended: 23 U.S.C. § 154

Legislative history
- Introduced in the House as H.R. 2 by Glenn Anderson (D-CA) on January 6, 1987; Passed the House on January 21, 1987 (401-20); Passed the Senate on February 4, 1987 (96-2, in lieu of S. 387); Reported by the joint conference committee on March 17, 1987; agreed to by the House on March 18, 1987 (407-17) and by the Senate on March 19, 1987 (79-17); Vetoed by President Ronald Reagan on March 27, 1987; Overridden by the House on March 31, 1987 (350-73); Overridden by the Senate and became law on April 2, 1987 (67-33)

The Surface Transportation and Uniform Relocation Assistance Act of 1987 (Pub. L. 100–17, 101 Stat. 132) is a United States Act of Congress, containing in Title I, the Federal-Aid Highway Act of 1987.

== History ==
The bill was introduced in House by Glenn Anderson (D-CA) on January 6, 1987. The bill nominally gave power to apportion money to the Secretary of Transportation. It also allowed states to raise the speed limit to 65 miles per hour (105 km/h) on rural Interstate highways (101 Stat. 218 of the act, amending 23 U.S.C. § 154).

It was followed by the Intermodal Surface Transportation Efficiency Act (ISTEA). The local agencies (counties and cities) in California were assured that an equal or not less amount of monies will still be annually apportioned to the counties and cities as they received in 1990–91 under the Federal Highway Act of 1987 under the old Federal Aid Urban (FAU) and Federal Aid Secondary Program.

== Veto and Override ==
Ronald Reagan notably vetoed this bill, shortly after the Tower commission report on the Iran-Contra incident came out, and he attempted to use the veto override vote as a show of his continued strength and influence over the senate. His stated reason for the override was an excess of funds devoted to mass transit projects and funds for over 100 local transportation infrastructure projects included in the bill. His veto was overriden by a vote of 67-33, the smallest possible margin of victory for a veto override, which requires a 2/3rds vote.
