= Transportation in the United States =

The vast majority of passenger travel in the United States occurs by automobile for shorter distances and airplane or railroad for longer distances. Most cargo in the U.S. is transported by, in descending order, railroad, truck, pipeline, or boat; air shipping is typically used only for perishables and premium express shipments. Transportation is the largest source of greenhouse gas emissions in the United States.

== Ownership and jurisdiction ==
The overwhelming majority of roads in the United States are owned and maintained by state and local governments. Federally maintained roads are generally found only on federal lands (such as national parks) and at federal facilities (like military bases). The Interstate Highway System is partly funded by the federal government but owned and maintained by individual state governments. There are a few private highways in the United States, which use tolls to pay for construction and maintenance. There are many local private roads, generally serving remote or insular residences.

Passenger and freight rail systems, bus systems, water ferries, and dams may be under either public or private ownership and operation. Civilian airlines are all privately owned. Most airports are owned and operated by local government authorities, but there are also some private airports. The Transportation Security Administration has provided security at most major airports since 2001.

The U.S. Department of Transportation and its divisions provide regulation, supervision, and the federal funding portion for all aspects of transportation, except for customs, immigration, and security, which are the responsibility of the U.S. Department of Homeland Security. Federal funding is typically allocated by a five-year transportation bill. Each state has its own Department of Transportation, which builds and maintains state highways, and depending upon the state, may either directly operate or supervise other modes of transportation.

Aviation law is almost entirely the jurisdiction of the U.S. federal government; the Federal Aviation Administration regulates all aspects of civil aviation, air traffic management, certification and compliance, and aviation safety.

Motor vehicle traffic laws are enacted and enforced by state and local authorities, with the exception of roads located on federal property (such as national parks and military bases) or in the unorganized U.S. territories.

The United States Coast Guard is the primary enforcer of law and security on U.S. waterways, inland as well as coastal, but economic jurisdiction over coastal tidelands is shared between state and federal governments.

== Mode share ==
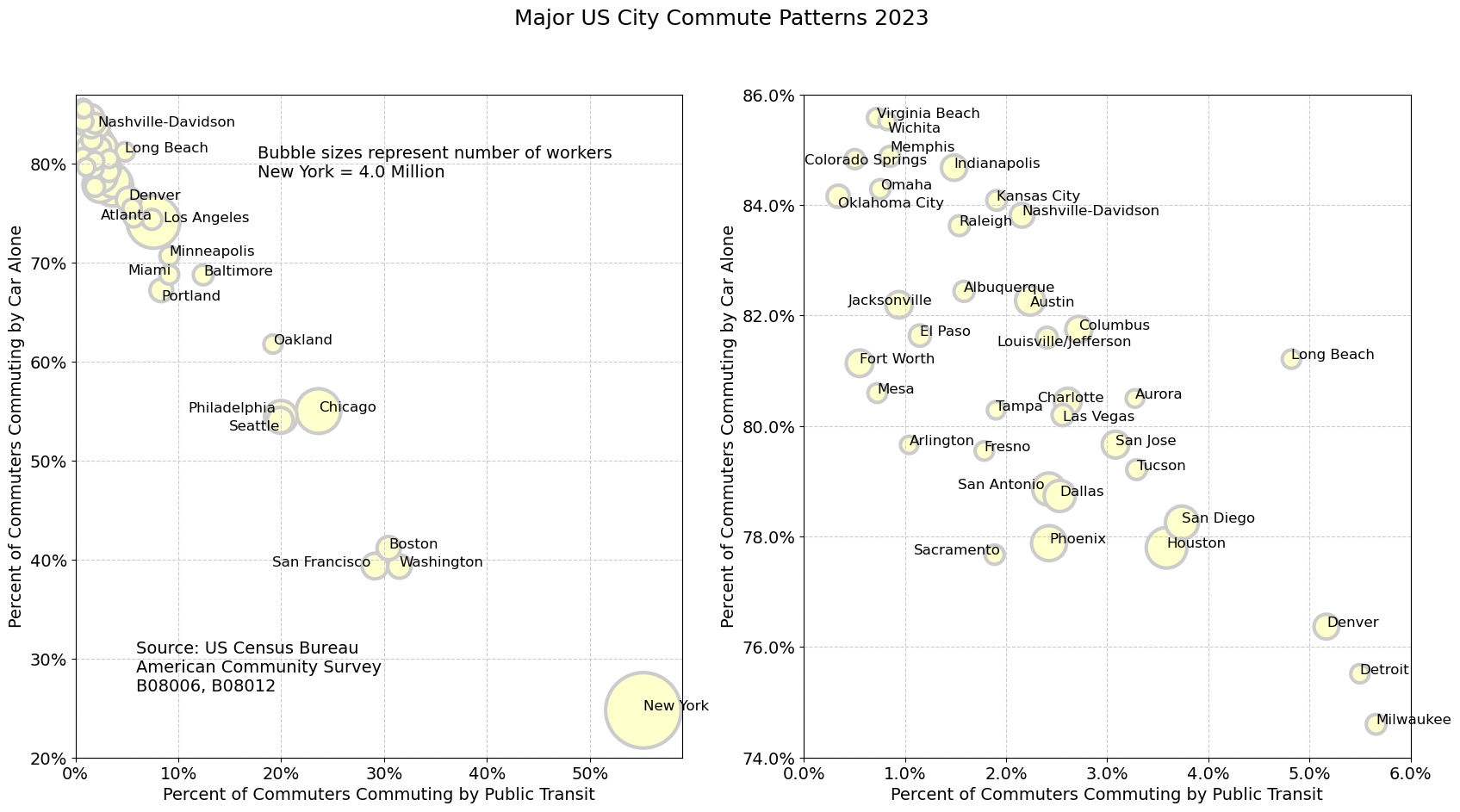
In most but not all American cities, the majority of work commutes are made by singly occupied automobiles.

=== Passenger ===
Mode of passenger transport	Passenger-miles (millions)	Percent
Highway — total	4,273,876	86.93%
Passenger vehicles, motorcycles	3,692,760	75.11%
Trucks	268,318	5.46%
Buses	312,797	6.36%
Air Carriers	580,501	11.81%
Rail — total	37,757	0.77%
Transit	19,832	0.40%
Commuter	11,121	0.23%
Intercity/Amtrak	6,804	0.14%
All other modes (e.g., ferryboats)	4,156	0.08%
Source: 2012 estimates by the Bureau of Transportation Statistics

Passenger transportation is dominated by a network of over 3.9 million miles of highways which is pervasive and highly developed by global standards. Passenger transportation is dominated by passenger vehicles (including cars, trucks, vans, and motorcycles), which account for 86% of passenger-miles traveled. The remaining 14% was handled by planes, trains, and buses. Public transit use is highly concentrated in large older cities, with only six above 25% and only New York City above 50% of trips on transit. Airlines carry almost all non-commuter intercity traffic, except the Northeast Corridor where Amtrak carries more than all airlines combined.

The world's second largest automobile market, the United States has the highest rate of per-capita vehicle ownership in the world, with 865 vehicles per 1,000 Americans.

Bicycle usage is minimal with the American Community Survey reporting that bicycle commuting had a 0.61% mode share in 2012 (representing 856,000 American workers nationwide).

=== Cargo ===
Mode of Freight Shipments	2011 Ton miles (billions)	Percent of Total
Truck	2,337	40.24%
Rail	1,518	26.13%
Water	434	7.47%
Air & Air/Truck	11	0.19%
Pipeline	1,018	17.53%
Multiple modes	489	8.43%
Other & Unknown	93	1.60%
Total	5,807	100%
Source: 2011 estimates by the Bureau of Transportation Statistics

Freight transportation is carried by a variety of networks. The largest percentage of US freight is carried by trucks (60%), followed by pipelines (18%), rail (10%), ship (8%), and air (0.01%). Other modes of transportation, such as parcels and intermodal freight accounted for about 3% of the remainder. Air freight is commonly used only for perishables and premium express shipments. The difference in percentage of rail's share by ton-miles and by weight (10% vs 38%) is accounted for by the extreme efficiency of trains. A single railroad locomotive may pull fifty boxcars full of freight while a truck only pulls one. Trucks surpass trains in the weight category due their greater numbers, while trains surpass trucks in the ton-miles category due to the vast distances they travel carrying large amounts of freight.

Usually cargo, apart from petroleum and other bulk commodities, is imported in containers through seaports, then distributed by road and rail. The quasi-governmental United States Postal Service has a monopoly on letter delivery (except for express services) but several large private companies such as FedEx and UPS compete in the package and cargo delivery market.

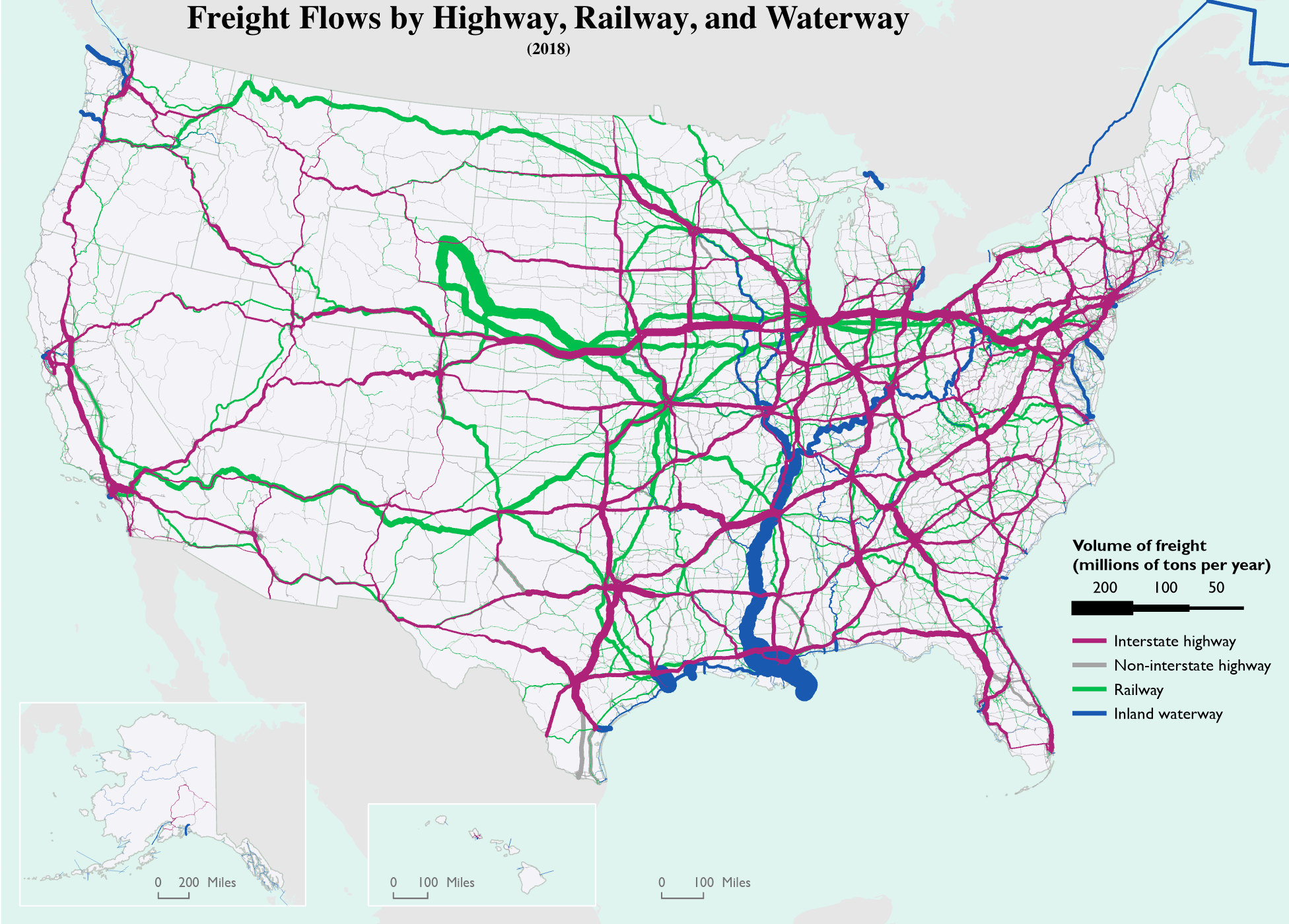
Freight flows by:
Interstate-Highways
Highways
Railways
Inland waterways

Freight Transport volumes (Tonne-Kilometers)

== Safety ==
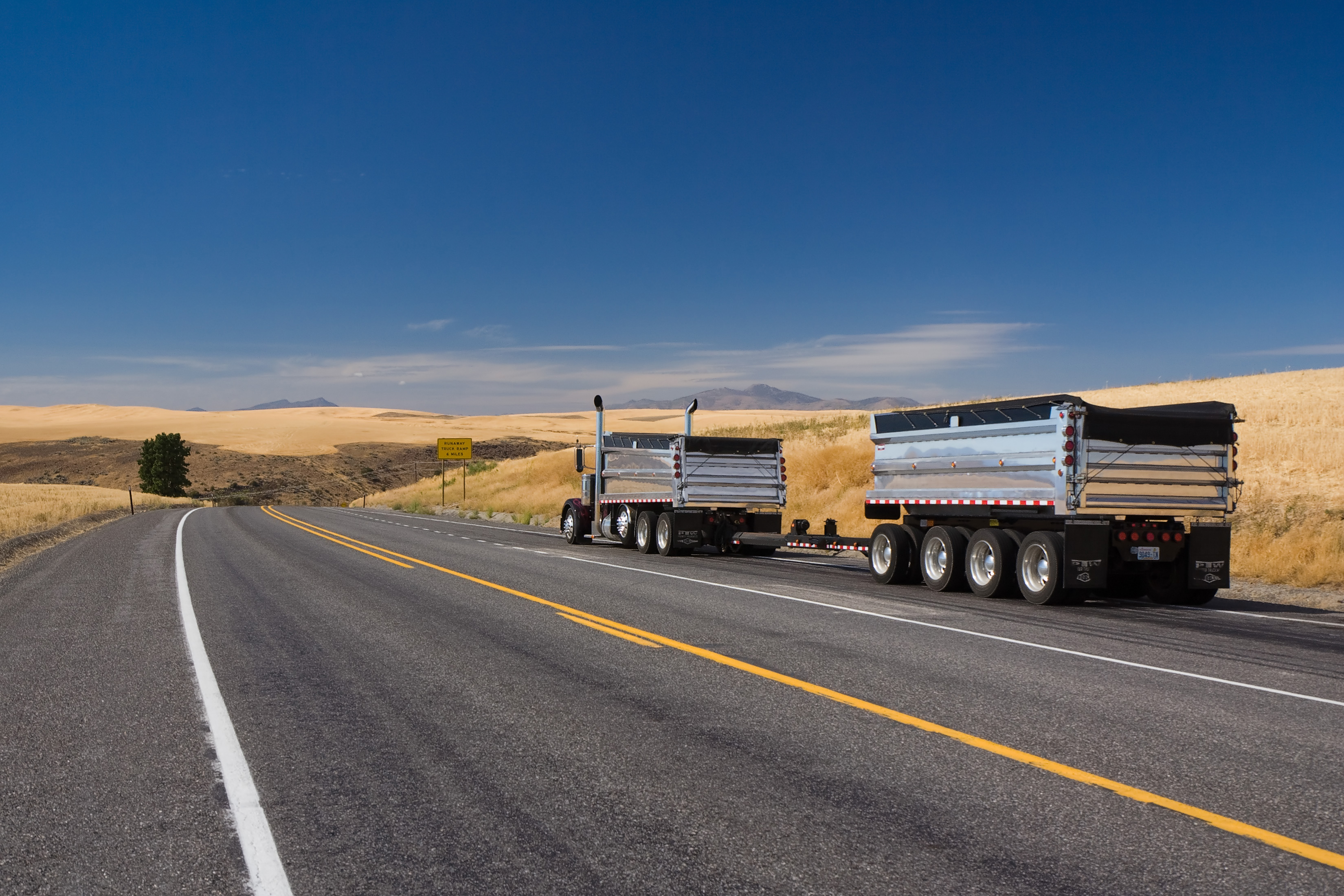
A transport truck in Eastern Washington

Data source: Motor vehicle traffic deaths in road accidents, by country

The U.S. government's National Center for Health Statistics reported 33,736 motor vehicle traffic deaths in 2014. This exceeded the number of firearm deaths, which was 33,599 in 2014.

In 2020 there was 115% more road fatalities in the US than in the European Union, or 53% less in the EU than in the US, with nearly 38,680 in the US, and nearly 18,800 in the EU.

U.S. passenger fatalities per billion passenger-miles 2002-2007
Mode	Passenger fatalities	Passenger-miles (millions)	Fatalities per billion miles
Passenger car	127,124	15,958,620 M	7.97
Light rail	79	9,980 M	7.92
Motor bus	399	117,982 M	3.38
Commuter rail	105	59,736 M	1.76
Heavy rail (subway)	106	86,900 M	1.22
Railroad (intercity)	36	33,234 M	1.08
Airline	113	3,326,286 M	0.03

== History ==
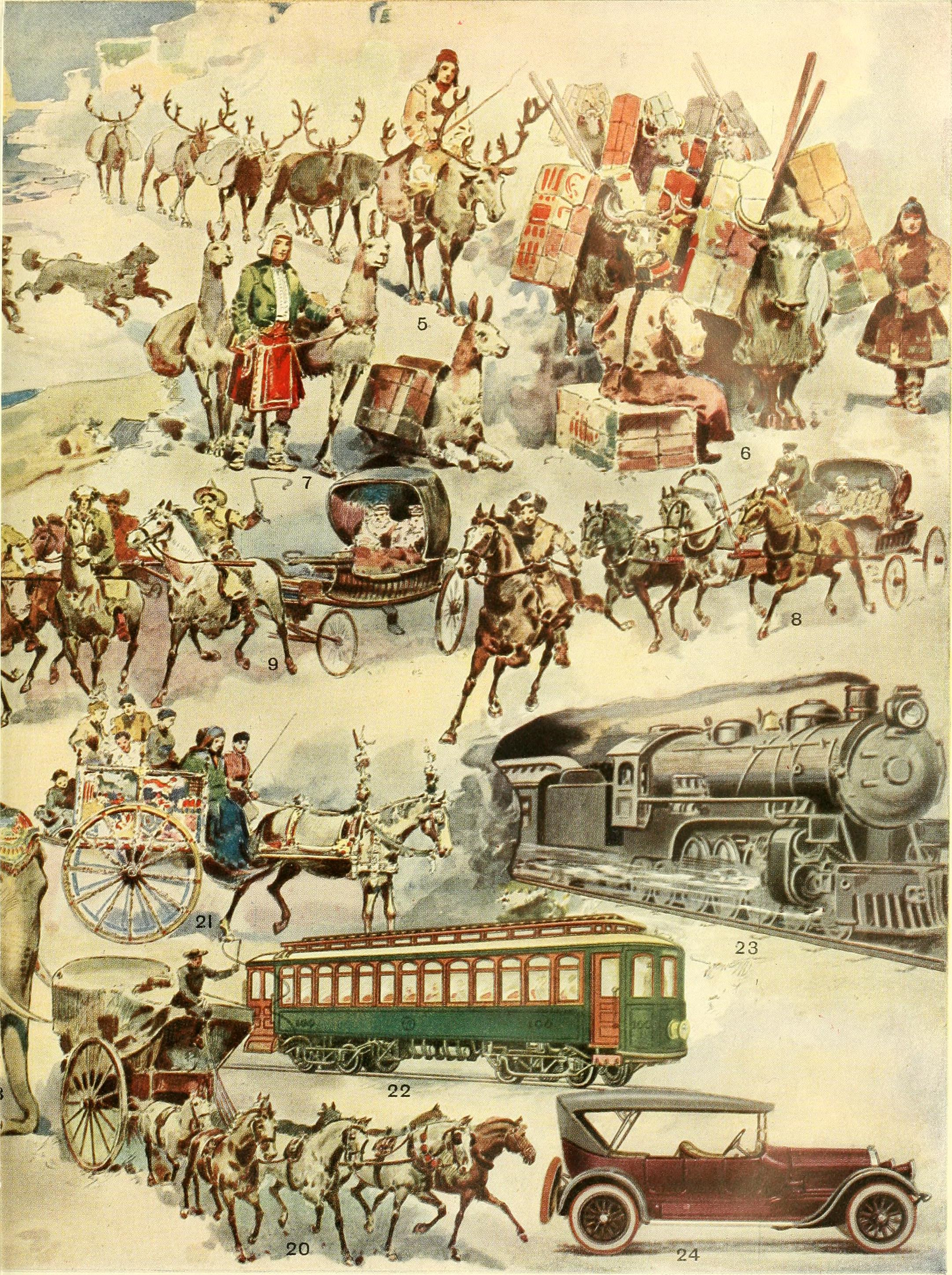
A 1921 illustration of deer, oxen, dog, alpaca, horse, railroad, and automobile transport

=== 18th century ===
In the late 18th century, overland transportation was by horse, while water and river transportation was primarily by sailing vessel. The United States population was centered on its Atlantic coast, with all major population centers located on a natural harbor or navigable waterway. Low population density between these centers resulted in a heavy reliance on coastwise and riverboat shipping.

The first government expenditures on highway transportation were funded to speed the delivery of overland mail, such as the Boston Post Road between New York City and Boston. Due to the distances between these population centers and the cost to maintain the roads, many highways in the late 18th century and early 19th century were private turnpikes.

Other highways were mainly unimproved and impassable by wagon at least some of the year. Economic expansion in the late 18th century to early 19th century spurred the building of canals to speed goods to market. One such prominent example was the Erie Canal.

=== 19th century ===
Numerous modes of transportation fought for supremacy throughout the Industrial revolution of the 19th century. Canals swiftly took the role of turnpikes, stagecoaches, and wagon routes, which in turn were shortly replaced by steam-powered riverboats. During this period, the advancement in transportation inspired many artists to display the grand contrast from the past to the new. Taking a look at Samuel Colman's work, one piece in particular, Storm King on the Hudson (1866) displayed both the older sailboats and the grand steamboats that were overtaking the Hudson River.

Access to water transportation shaped the geography of early settlements and boundaries. For example, the Erie Canal escalated the boundary dispute called the Toledo War between Ohio and Michigan in the 1830s. The disputed Erie Triangle was awarded to Pennsylvania, giving that state access to Lake Erie. Most of West Florida was given to Mississippi and Alabama to guarantee their access to the Gulf of Mexico.

Development of the mid-western and southern states drained by the Mississippi River system (Mississippi, Ohio and Missouri Rivers) was accelerated by the introduction of steamboats on these rivers in the early 19th Century. These three rivers (among others) also form the borders of several states. Prior to the introduction of steamboats, transit upstream was impractical because of strong currents on parts of these waterways. Steamboats provided both passenger and freight transportation until the development of railroads later in the 19th Century gradually reduced their presence.

The rapid expansion of railroads brought the canal boom to a sudden end, providing a quick, scheduled and year-round mode of transportation that quickly spread to interconnect the states by the mid-19th century. During the industrialization of the United States after the Civil War, railroads, led by the transcontinental rail system in the 1860s, expanded quickly across the United States to serve industries and the growing cities. During the late 19th century, railroads often had built redundant routes to a competitor's road or built through sparsely populated regions that generated little traffic. These marginal rail routes survived the pricing pressures of competition, or the lack of revenue generated by low traffic, as long as railroads provided the only efficient economical way to move goods and people across the United States. In addition to the intercity passenger network running on Class I and II railroads, a large network of interurban (trolley or "street running") rail lines extended out from the cities and interchanged passenger and freight traffic with the railroads and also provided competition.

=== 20th century ===
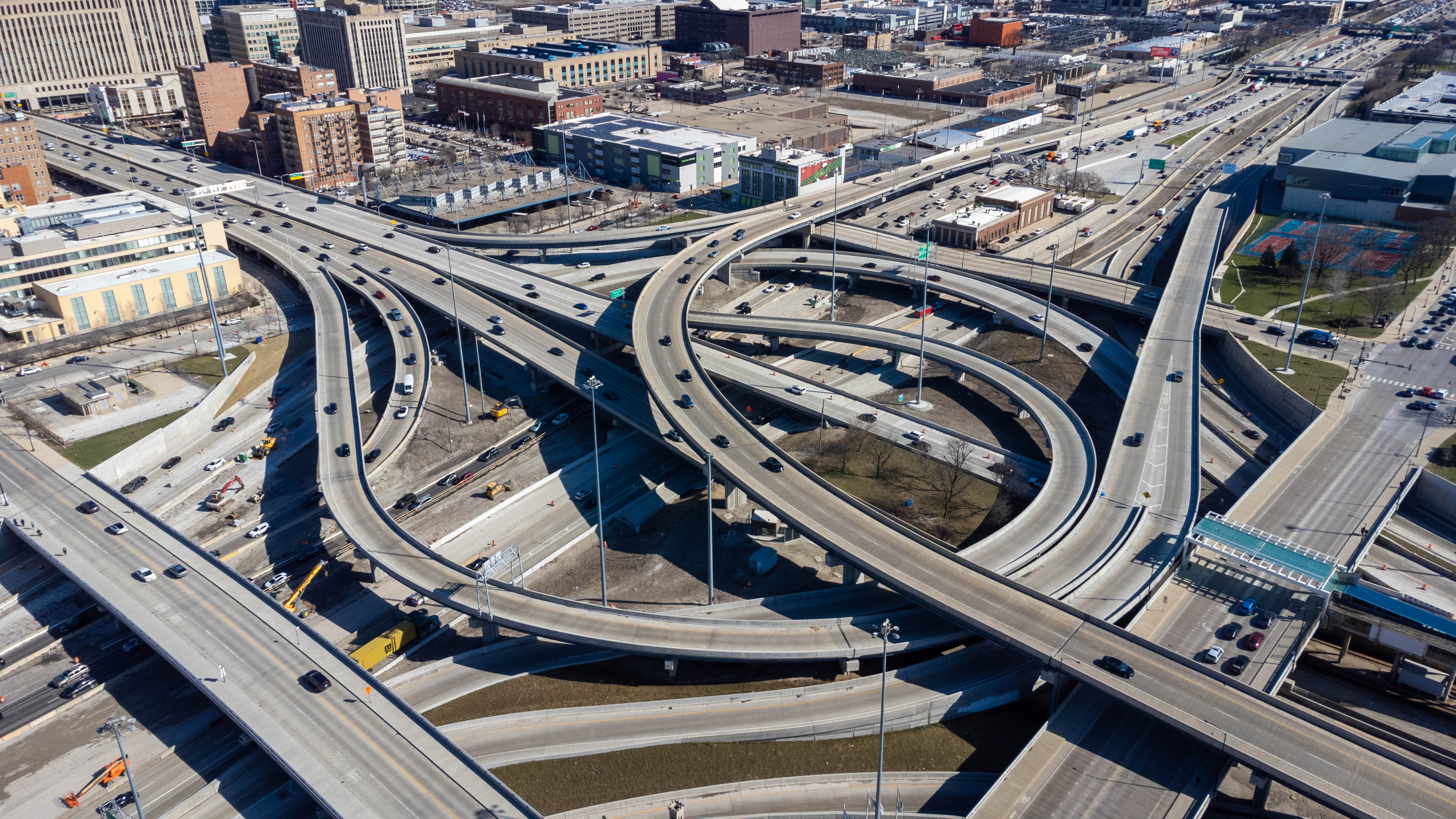
The Jane Byrne Interchange in downtown Chicago

The advent of the automobile signaled the end of railroads as the predominant transportation for people and began a new era of mobility in the United States. The early 20th century Lincoln Highway and other auto trails gave way in the 1920s to an early national highway system making the automobile the primary mode of travel for most Americans. Interurban rail service declined, followed by trolley cars due in part to the advent of motorized buses and the lack of dedicated rights-of-way but also by deliberate efforts to dismantle urban rail infrastructure.

The scarcity of industrial materials during World War II slowed the growth of automobile manufacturing briefly and contributed to the nation's declining rail network. In the 1950s, however, the United States renewed building a network of high-capacity, high-speed highways to link its vast territory. The most important element is the Interstate Highway system, first commissioned in the 1950s by President Dwight D. Eisenhower and modeled partly after the Italian autostrada and the German Autobahn system.

By 1945, after the end of World War II, nearly every city in America had at least one electric tram company providing intra-city transportation. There were an estimated 36,377 light rail vehicles in operation. Increased automobile ownership cut this number by 1/3 by 1965.

The airline industry began to successfully compete with intercity rail as a result of government investment, which suffered a loss of ridership. As the civil air transportation network of airports and other infrastructure expanded, air travel became more accessible to the general population. Technological advances ushered in the jet age, which increased airline capacity, while decreasing travel times and the cost of flights. The costs of flying rapidly decreased intercity rail ridership by the late 1960s to a point where railroads could no longer profitably operate networks of passenger trains. By the early 1970s almost all passenger rail operation and ownership had been transferred to various federal, municipal and state agencies.

Freight railroads continued to decline as motor freight captured a significant portion of the less-than-carload business. This loss of business, when combined with the highly regulated operating environment and constrained pricing power, forced many railroads into receivership and the nationalization of several critical eastern carriers into the Consolidated Rail Corporation (Conrail). Deregulation of the railroads by the Staggers Act in 1980 created a regulatory environment more favorable to the economics of the railroad industry.

In the 1990s, the increase in foreign trade and intermodal container shipping led to a revival of the freight railroads, which have effectively consolidated into two eastern and two western private transportation networks: Union Pacific and BNSF in the west, and CSX and Norfolk Southern in the east. Canadian National Railway took over the Illinois Central route down the Mississippi River valley.

=== 21st century ===
In 2014, freight transportation establishments serving for-hire transportation and warehousing operations employed nearly 4.6 million workers and comprised 9.5 percent of the Nation's economic activity as measured by GDP. Truck driving is by far the largest freight transportation occupation, with approximately 2.83 million truck drivers. About 57.5 percent of these professional truck drivers operate heavy or tractor-trailer trucks and 28.2 percent drive light or delivery service trucks.

According to Freight Facts and Figures 2015, U.S. freight transportation system handled a record amount of freight in 2014. A daily average of approximately 55 million tons of freight valued at $49.3 billion moved across the transportation system in 2014 to meet the needs of the nation's 122.5 million households, 7.5 million business establishments, and 90,056 Government units.

Wartime expediency encouraged long distance pipeline transport of petroleum and natural gas, which was greatly expanded in the middle 20th century to take over most of the domestic long-haul market.

== Road transportation ==
=== Infrastructure and private automobile use ===
The Interstate highway system in the United States is the largest national controlled-access highway network in the world.

Maximum speed limits in the U.S. states vary by state from 60 to 85 mph.

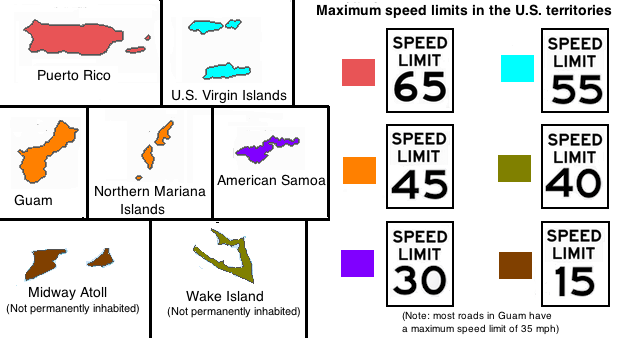
Maximum speed limits in the U.S. territories vary by territory from 15 to 65 mph.

In comparison to some parts of the Western world, both the United States and Canada rely more heavily on motorized transit over walking and bicycling with 86% of American workers commuting to work via private vehicle, costing an estimated additional $1500 per year commuting compared to Western European counterparts. Car ownership is on the decline but still 91% nationally. Car ownership is universal, except in the largest cities where extensive mass transit and railroad systems have been built, with lowest car ownership rates in New York City (44%), Washington, D.C. (62%), Boston (63%), Philadelphia (67%), San Francisco (69%), and Baltimore (69%).

With the development of the extensive Eisenhower Interstate Highway System in the 1950s, both long distance trips and daily commutes were mostly by private automobile. This network was designed to exacting federal standards in order to receive federal funding. The system, as of 2010, has a total length of 47,182 miles (75,932 km), making it the world's second longest after China's, and the largest public works project in US history.

The Interstate system joined an existing National Highway System, a designation created for the legacy highway network in 1995, comprising 160,000 miles (256,000 kilometers) of roadway, a fraction of the total mileage of roads. The Interstate system serves nearly all major U.S. cities, often through the downtown areas, which triggered freeway and expressway revolts in the 1960s and 1970s. The distribution of many goods and services involves Interstate highways at some point. Residents of American cities commonly use urban Interstates to travel to their places of work. The vast majority of long-distance travel, whether for vacation or business, is by the national road network; of these trips, about one-third (by the total number of miles driven in the country in 2003) utilize the Interstate system.

In addition to the routes of the Interstate system, there are those of the U.S. highway system. These routes, which are unrelated to those of the National Highway System, are supplemented by State Highways, and the local roads of counties, municipal streets, and federal agencies, such as the Bureau of Indian Affairs. The five inhabited U.S. territories also have their own road networks. There are approximately 4,161,000 miles (6,696,000 km) of roads in the United States, 2,844,000 miles (4,577,000 km) paved and 1,317,000 miles (2,120,000 km) unpaved. State highways are constructed by each state, but frequently maintained by county governments aided by funding from the state, where such counties exist as governing entities in mostly every state outside of the northeast. Counties construct and maintain all remaining roads outside cities, except in private communities. Local, unnumbered roads are often constructed by private contractors to local standards, then maintenance is assumed by the local government.

All federal highways are maintained by state governments, although they receive federal aid to build and maintain freeways signed as part of the 46,000 mile (75,000 km) nationwide Interstate highway network. Changes by state initiative may be made with federal approval. A large number of expressways are actually government or privately operated toll roads in many East Coast and Midwestern states. West Coast freeways are generally free to users, which is the basis of their name, since freeways have no toll charged per use, although since the 1990s there have been some small experiments with toll roads operated by private companies.

After the collapse of the I-35W Mississippi River bridge in Minnesota in August 2007, the backlog of road and bridge maintenance across the country became an issue in transportation funding. The collapse prompted a tax increase in Minnesota to speed up bridge repairs, and action in other states, such as the Accelerated Bridge Program in Massachusetts, but after some debate no increase in federal funding.

The I-5 Skagit River bridge collapse in 2013, caused by a collision with an over-height truck, highlighted fracture critical bridges in which the failure of only one structural member will lead to complete collapse. According to the National Bridge Inventory, there are at least 600,000 bridges of 20 feet or more in length in the United States, all subject to deterioration in the absence of preventative maintenance. In December 2008, 72,868 bridges in the United States (12.1%) were categorized as "structurally deficient", representing an estimated $48 billion in repairs. President Barack Obama proposed $50 billion of spending on road and bridge repair, plus a national infrastructure bank, but Congress did not act on these proposals. President Donald Trump also failed to get infrastructure funding approved. In 2021, President Joe Biden signed a bipartisan infrastructure bill with about $110 billion for roads and bridges.

As of 2010, seat belt use is mandatory in all states except New Hampshire. Seat belt use is also mandatory in Washington, D.C., the national capital, and the five inhabited U.S. territories.

=== Intercity bus ===
Greyhound Lines is the largest intercity bus company in the United States, with routes in all parts of the contiguous U.S. There are also many smaller regional bus companies, many of which use the terminal and booking facilities provided by Greyhound. Intercity bus is, in most cases, the least expensive way to travel long distances in the United States.

=== Congestion ===
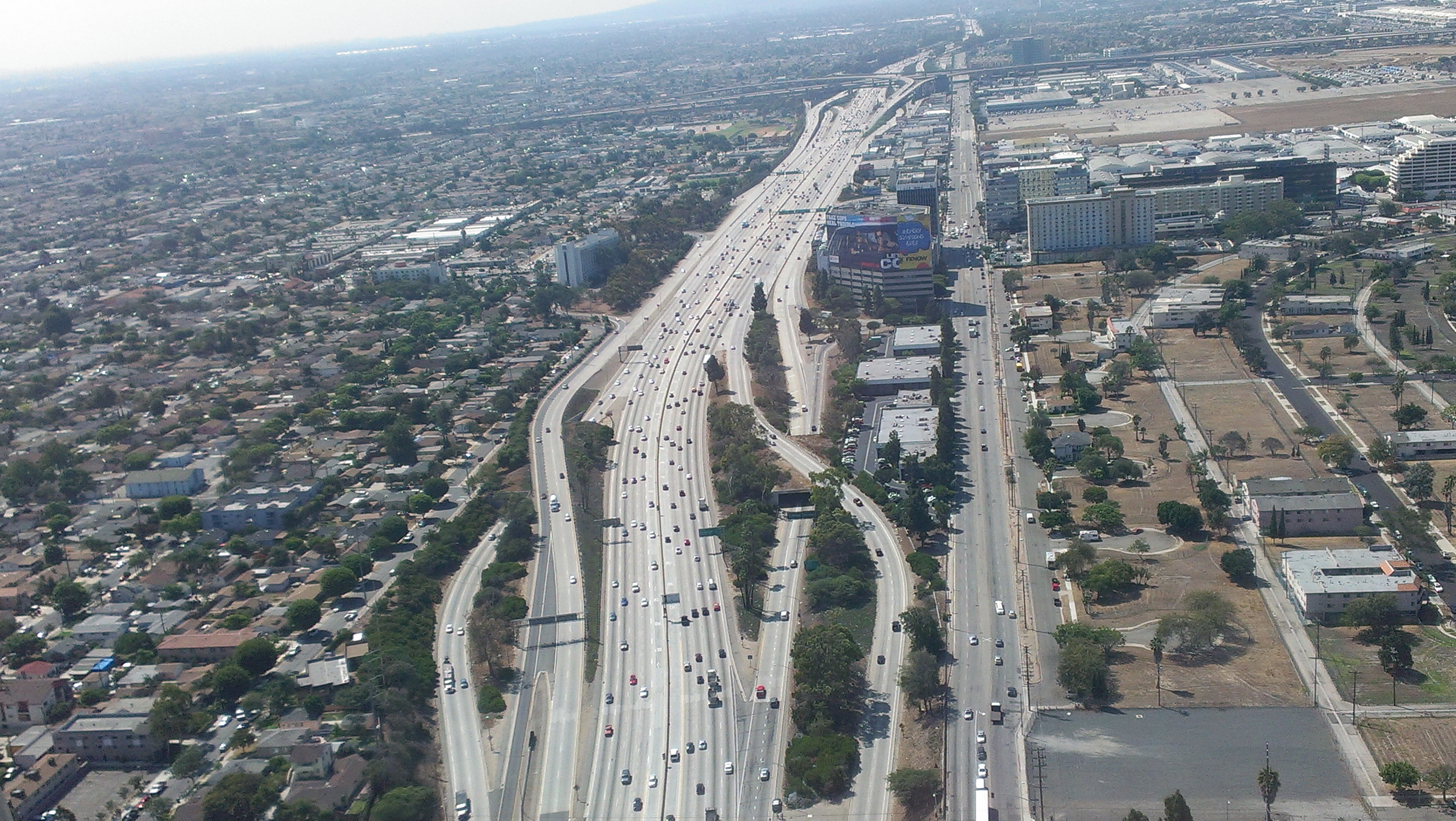
Traffic on a typical American freeway in Los Angeles

Traffic congestion, especially at rush hour, is often considered a problem in many of the country's larger cities. A 2009 study claimed that traffic congestion costs the United States almost $87.2 billion. The economic costs of traffic congestion have increased 63% over the past decade, and despite the declining traffic volumes caused by the economic downturn, Americans still waste more than 2.8 billion US gallons (11 million cubic metres) of fuel each year as a result of traffic congestion. Motorists also waste 4.2 billion hours annually, or one full workweek per traveler. Moreover, it is estimated that drivers are wasting 6.9 billion hours per year or about 42 hours per driver in traffic congestion as a result of aging infrastructure and poor road conditions.

The United States continues to follow a method of attempting to resolve congestion by widening roadways. From 1993 to 2017, the nation's largest 100 urbanized areas added 42% more freeway lane milage, despite population growing by only 32%. However, this policy of widening roadways resulted in a 144% increase in congestion, due to the concept of induced demand.

=== Cargo ===
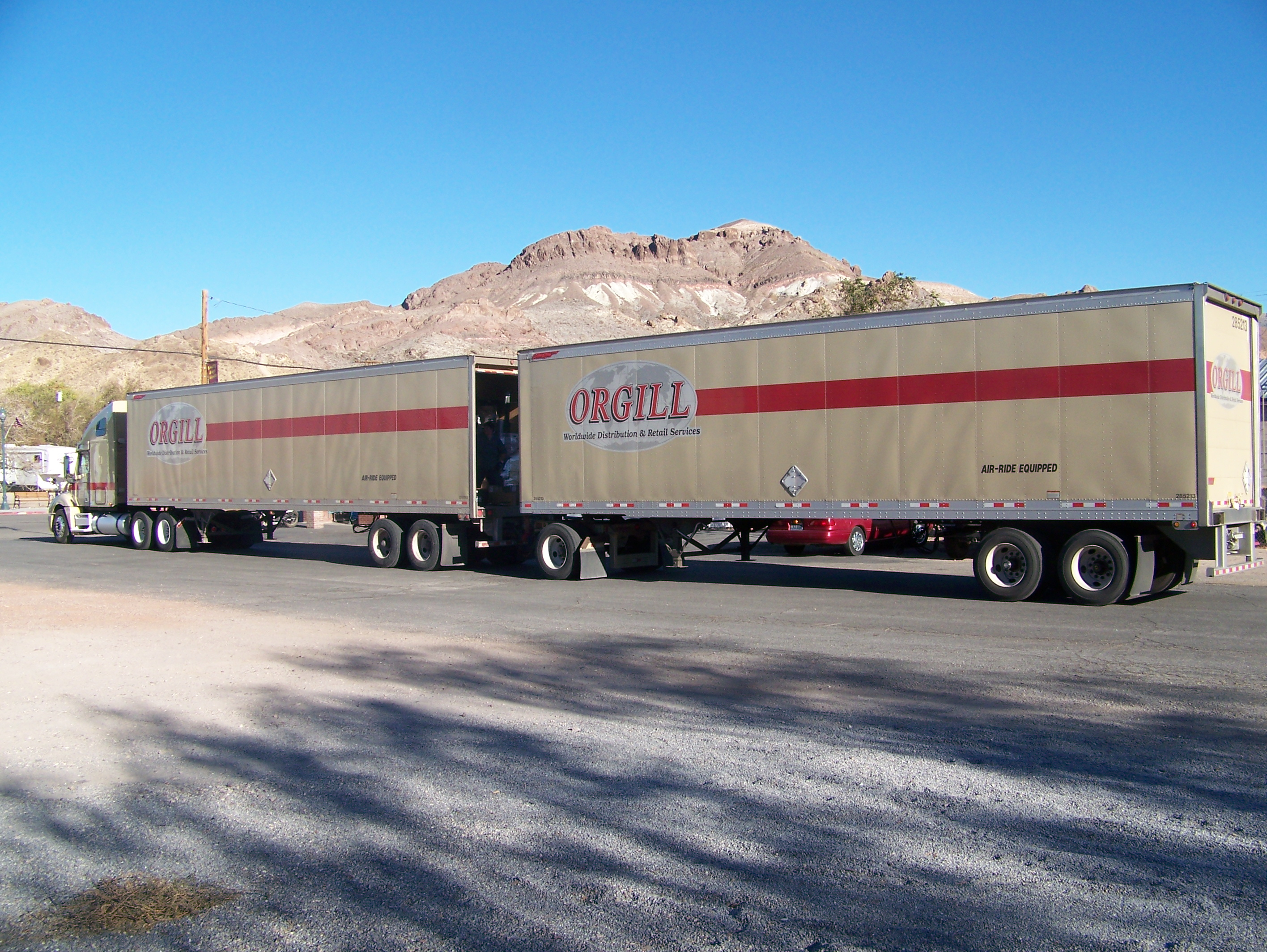
Orgill distribution truck and trailer in Nevada

The trucking industry (also referred to as the transportation or logistics industry) involves the transport and distribution of commercial and industrial goods using commercial motor vehicles (CMV). In this case, CMVs are most often trucks; usually semi trucks, box trucks, or dump trucks. A truck driver (commonly referred to as a "trucker") is a person who earns a living as the driver of a CMV.

The trucking industry provides an essential service to the American economy by transporting large quantities of raw materials, works in process, and finished goods over land—typically from manufacturing plants to retail distribution centers. Trucks are also important to the construction industry, as dump trucks and portable concrete mixers are necessary to move the large amounts of rocks, dirt, concrete, and other construction material. Trucks in America are responsible for the majority of freight movement over land, and are vital tools in the manufacturing, transportation, and warehousing industries.

Large trucks and buses require a commercial driver's license (CDL) to operate. Obtaining a CDL requires extra education and training dealing with the special knowledge requirements and handling characteristics of such a large vehicle. Drivers of CMVs must adhere to the hours of service, which are regulations governing the driving hours of commercial drivers. These, and all other rules regarding the safety of interstate commercial driving, are issued by the Federal Motor Carrier Safety Administration (FMCSA). The FMCSA is also a division of the United States Department of Transportation (USDOT), which governs all transportation-related industries such as trucking, shipping, railroads, and airlines. Some other issues are handled by another branch of the USDOT, the Federal Highway Administration (FHWA).

Developments in technology, such as computers, satellite communication, and the internet, have contributed to many improvements within the industry. These developments have increased the productivity of company operations, saved the time and effort of drivers, and provided new, more accessible forms of entertainment to men and women who often spend long periods of time away from home. In 2006, the U.S. Environmental Protection Agency implemented revised emission standards for diesel trucks (reducing airborne pollutants emitted by diesel engines) which promises to improve air quality and public health.

=== Roadway links with adjacent countries and non-contiguous parts of the United States ===
Within the United States:

- Alaska – Yes, via Canada and the Alaska Marine Highway in Washington
- Hawaii – No.
- American Samoa – No.
- Guam – No.
- Northern Mariana Islands – No.
- Puerto Rico – No.
- U.S. Virgin Islands – No.

With adjacent countries:

- Canada – Yes.
- Mexico – Yes.
- Russia – No, but proposed via Bering Strait crossing
- Cuba – No. Since the American embargo against Cuba, car ferry service from Florida and New Orleans to Havana ceased in 1962.
- Bahamas – No, but ferries travel to the Bahamas

=== Traffic codes ===
Each state has its own traffic code, although most of the rules of the road are similar for the purpose of uniformity, given that all states grant reciprocal driving privileges (and penalties) to each other's licensed drivers.

== Air transportation ==
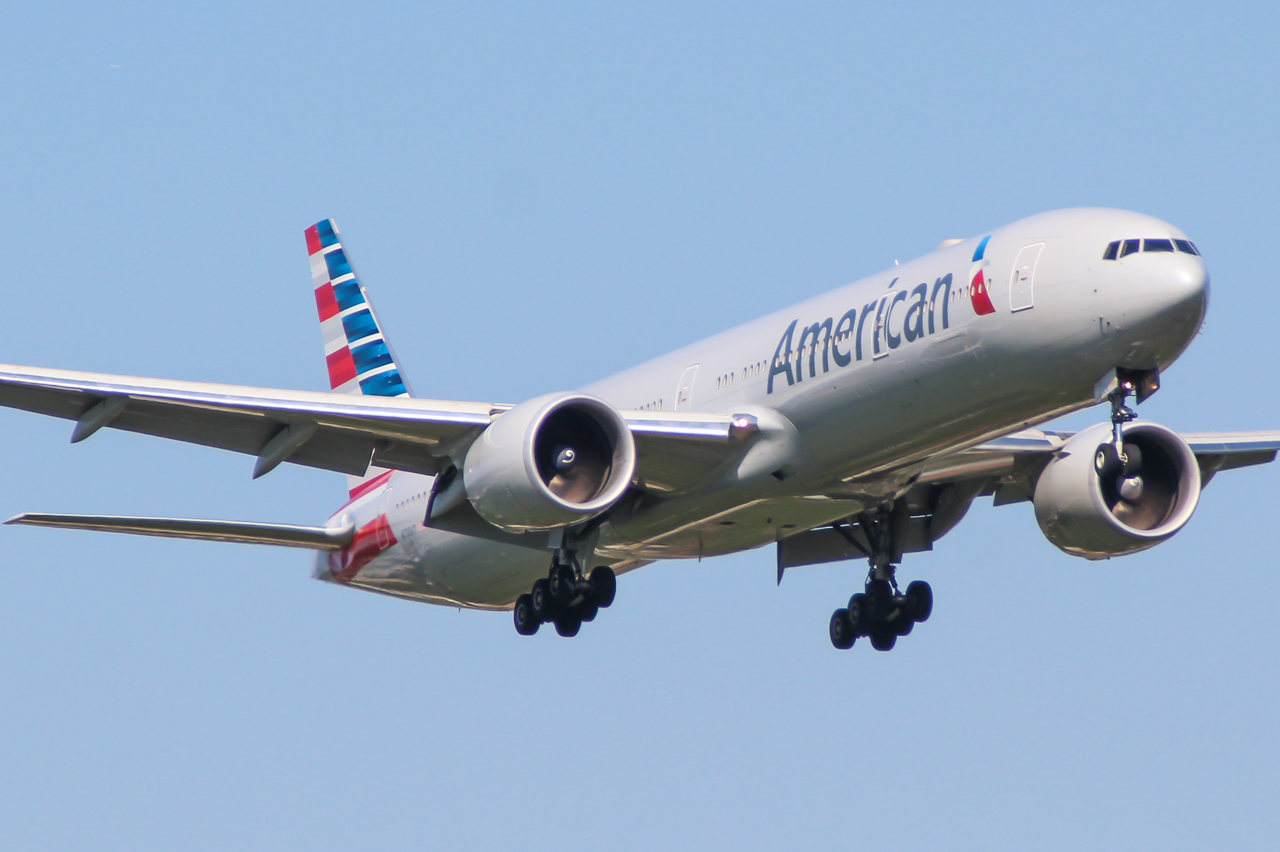
A Boeing 777 from the United States landing at London Heathrow Airport. Air travel is the most popular means of long-distance passenger travel in the United States.

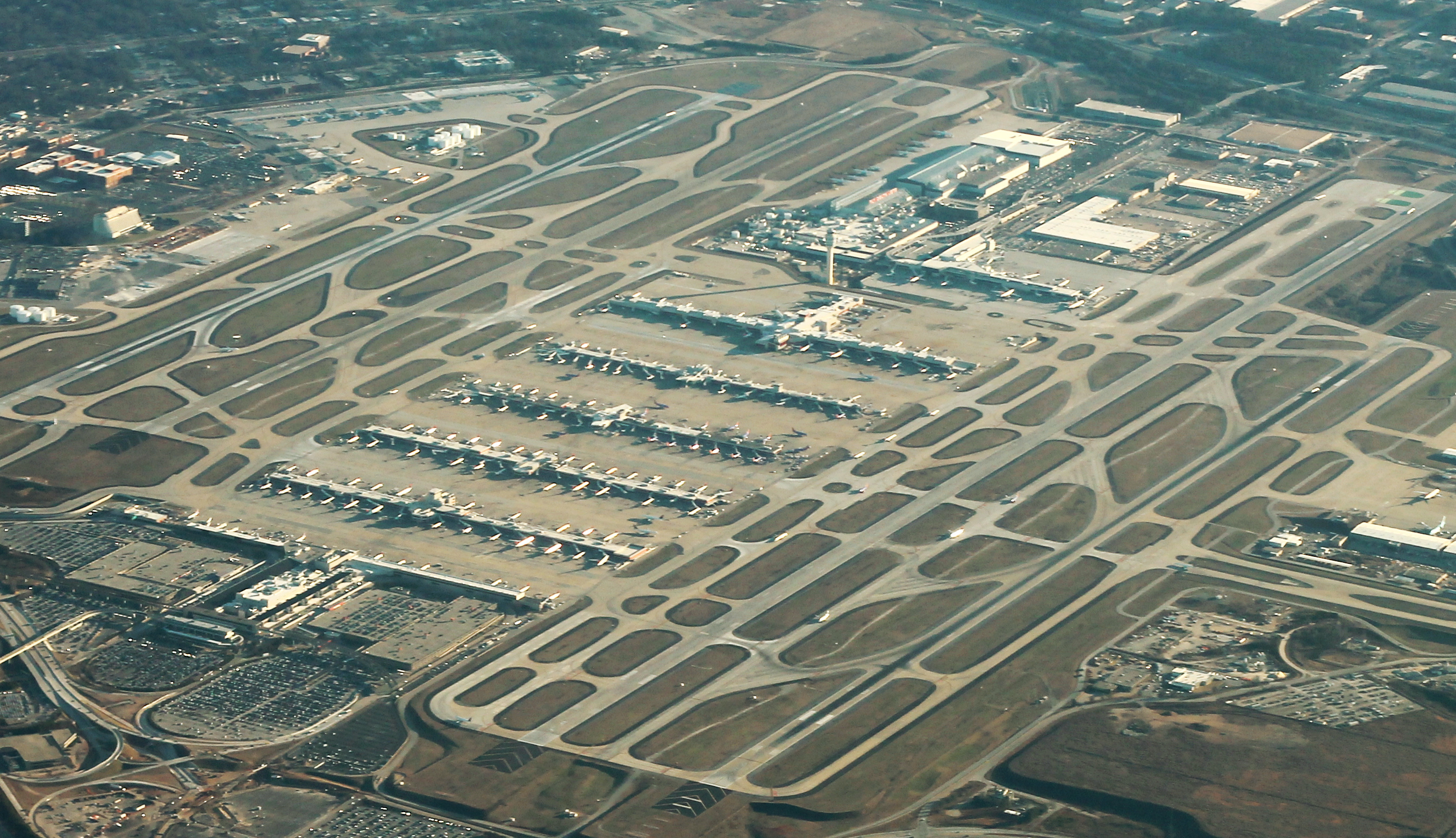
Hartsfield–Jackson Atlanta International Airport in the Atlanta metropolitan area, the world's busiest airport by passenger traffic with 108.1 million passengers annually in 2024

The United States has advanced air transportation infrastructure which utilizes approximately 5,000 paved runways. In terms of passenger traffic, 17 of the world's 30 busiest airports in 2004 were in the United States, including the world's busiest, Hartsfield-Jackson Atlanta International Airport. In terms of cargo, in the same year, 12 of the world's 30 busiest airports were in the United States, including the world's busiest, Memphis International Airport. Private aircraft are also used for medical emergencies, government agencies, large businesses, and individuals, see general aviation.

There is no single national flag airline; passenger airlines in the United States have always been privately owned. There are over 200 domestic passenger and cargo airlines and a number of international carriers. The major international carriers of the United States are Delta Air Lines, American Airlines, and United Airlines. Low-cost carrier Southwest Airlines operates few international routes, but has grown its domestic operations to a size comparable to the major international carriers. There is currently no government regulation of ticket pricing, although the federal government retains jurisdiction over aircraft safety, pilot training, and accident investigations (through the Federal Aviation Administration and the National Transportation Safety Board). The Transportation Security Administration provides security at airports.

== Rail ==
=== Passenger ===
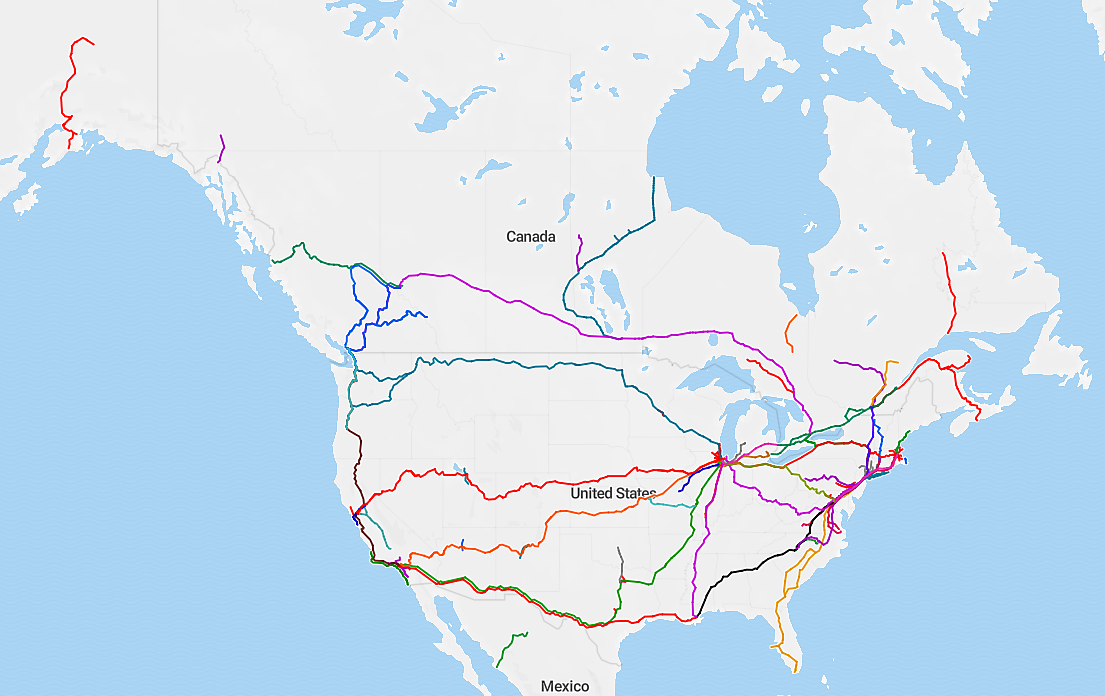
Passenger trains in North America

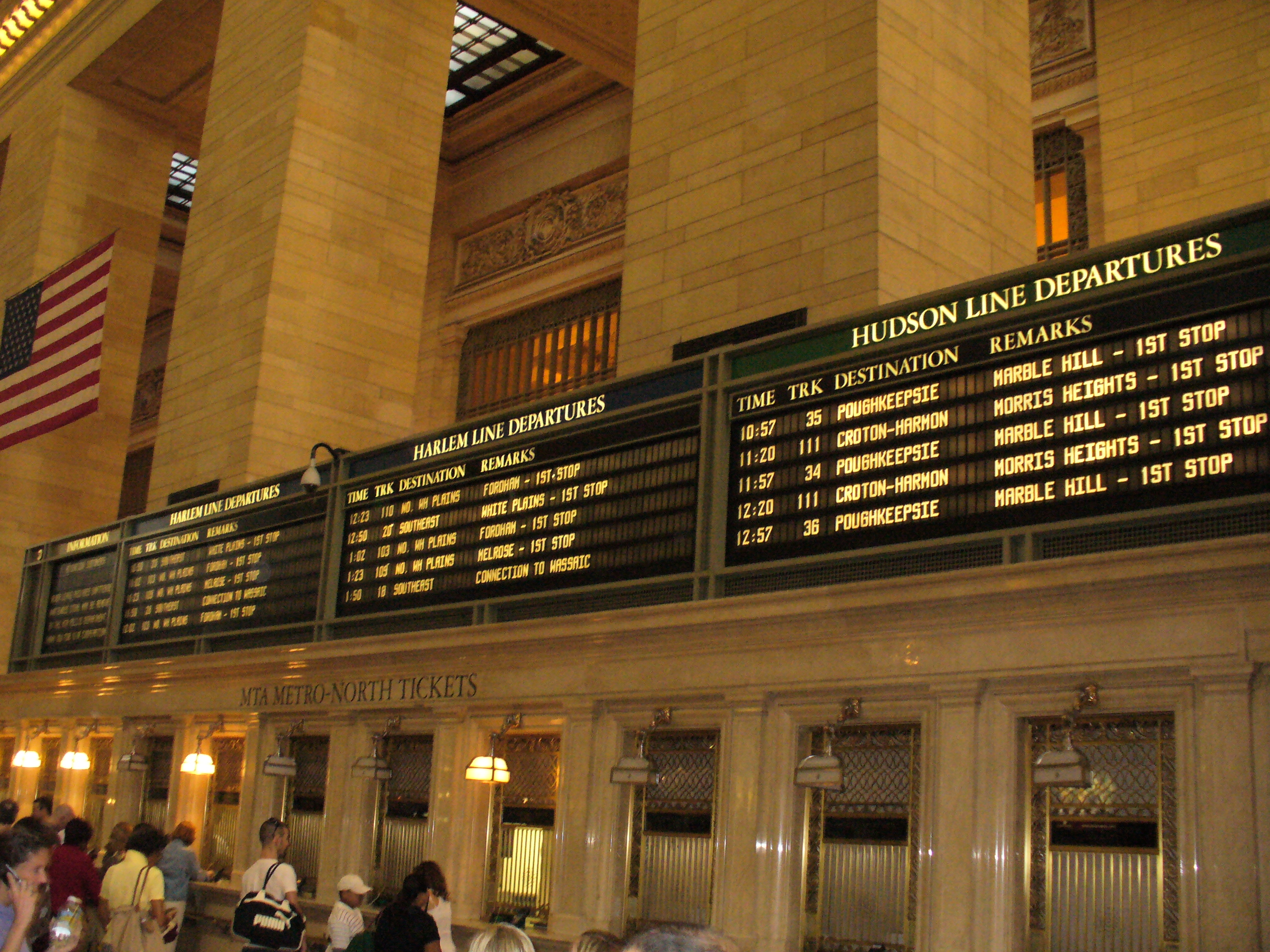
Grand Central Terminal in New York City, the second-busiest train station by passenger traffic in North America after New York Penn Station, also in New York City

Passenger trains were the dominant mode of transportation until the mid-twentieth century. The introduction of jet airplanes on major U.S. routes and the completion of the Interstate Highway System accelerated a decline in intercity rail passenger demand during the 1960s, resulting in the sharp curtailment of passenger service by private railroads. This led to the creation of National Railroad Passenger Corporation, now called Amtrak, by the U.S. federal government in 1971 to maintain limited intercity rail passenger service in most parts of the country. Amtrak serves most major cities but, outside of the Northeast, California, and Illinois, often by only a few trains per day. Amtrak does not serve several major destinations, including Las Vegas, and Phoenix, Arizona. Frequent service is available in regional corridors between certain major cities, particularly the Northeast Corridor between Washington, D.C., Philadelphia, New York City and Boston, between New York City and Albany, around Chicago, and in parts of California and the Pacific Northwest.

Private intercity rail ended in the United States in 1983 with the discontinuation of the Rio Grande Zephyr, until Brightline started in South Florida in 2018. The state-owned Alaska Railroad is the only other intercity passenger railroad still operating. It has only rail ferry connections with other railroads.

==== Rapid transit ====
There are 15 heavy rail rapid transit systems in the United States. The New York City Subway is the largest rapid transit system in the world by number of stations.

=== Cargo ===
The United States makes extensive use of its rail system for freight. According to the Association of American Railroads, "U.S. freight railroads are the world's busiest, moving more freight than any rail system in any other country. In fact, U.S. railroads move more than four times as much freight as do all of Western Europe's freight railroads combined."

Nearly all railroad corridors not including local transit rail systems are owned by private companies that provide freight service. Amtrak pays these companies for the right to use the tracks for passenger service. There are approximately 150,000 mi (240,000 km) of mainline track in the United States—the world's longest national railroad network.

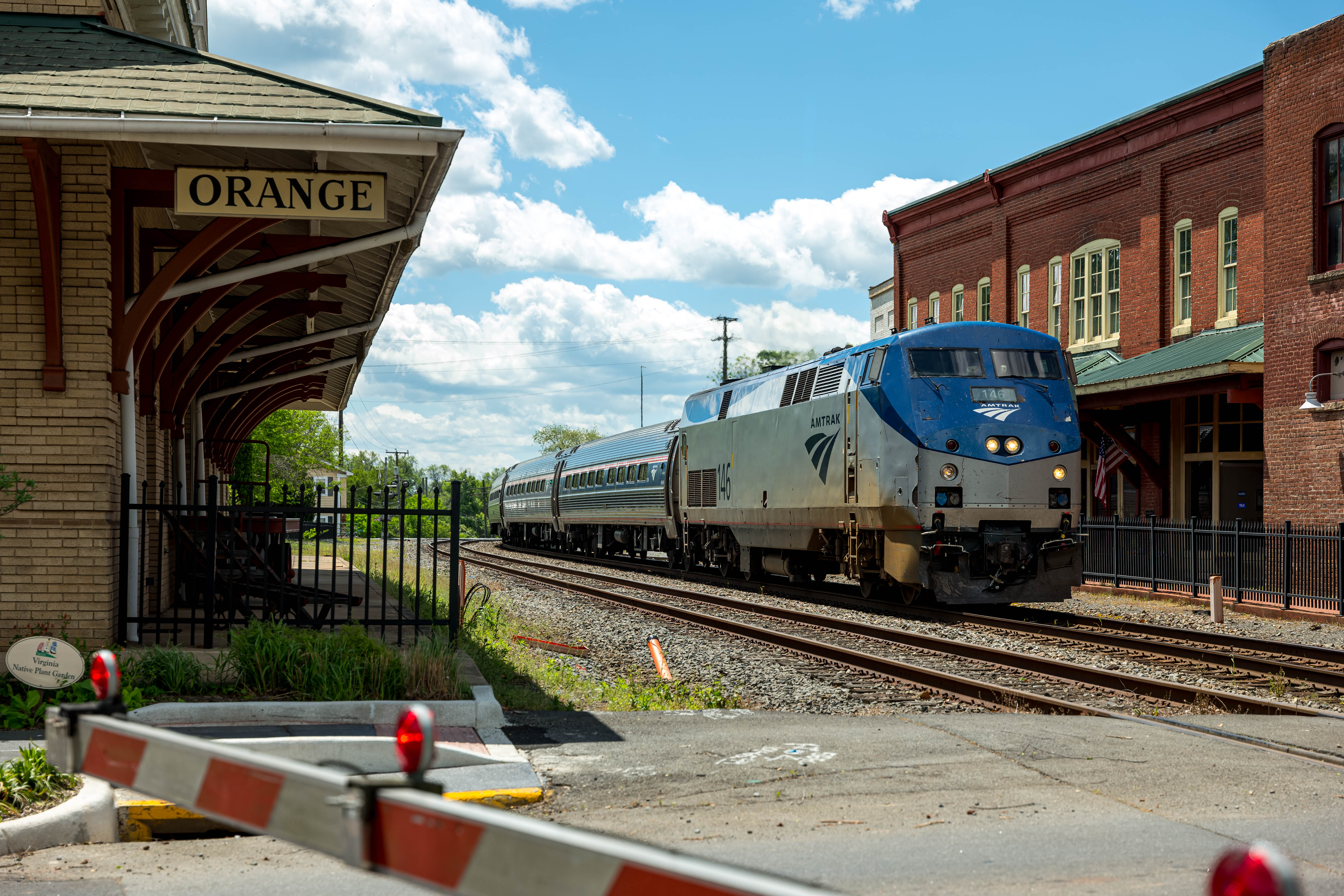
Amtrak P42DC 164 through Orange, Virginia

Rail freight has a major national bottleneck in Chicago and the Midwest, representing approximately one-third of the nation's freight trains pass through the region, which is the subject of an ongoing $4.6 billion infrastructure improvement project which started in 2003.

=== Railway links with adjacent countries ===
- Canada – Amtrak connections run daily between New York City and Montreal, Quebec, Toronto, Ontario, and Seattle and Vancouver, British Columbia. Alaska is currently rail-accessible by train ferry from Bellingham, Washington and narrow gauge railroad from Whitehorse, Yukon Territory to Skagway. A proposed link to the contiguous United States would link Alaska and Canada via the Yukon and British Columbia. The Canadian National Railway system includes the former Illinois Central route from Chicago via Memphis to New Orleans.
- Mexico – Several private firms run touristic trains from near El Paso, Texas, through Chihuahua, Chihuahua and the Copper Canyon to El Fuerte, Sinaloa. Such trains also run from Nogales, Sonora, but no U.S. passenger trains run near Nogales, Arizona, on the other side of the border. Another touristic train runs occasional trains between Campo, California, and Tecate, Baja California.

With few exceptions, the rail gauge is standard gauge 4 ft 8 1/2 in (1,435 mm). The White Pass and Yukon Route from Skagway, Alaska to Whitehorse, Yukon by way of Bennett, British Columbia is 3 ft (914 mm) gauge.

== Mass transit ==
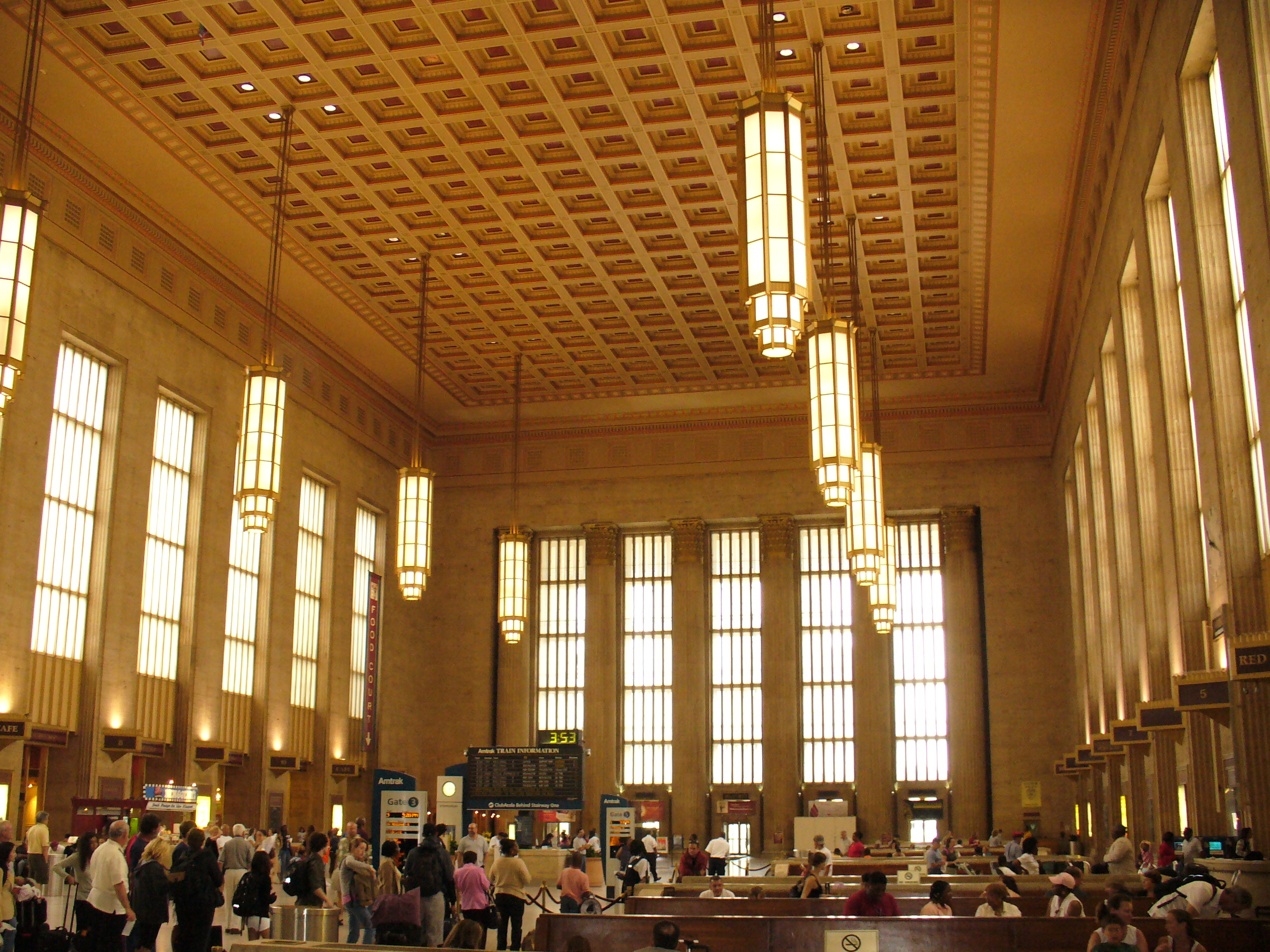
30th Street Station in Philadelphia

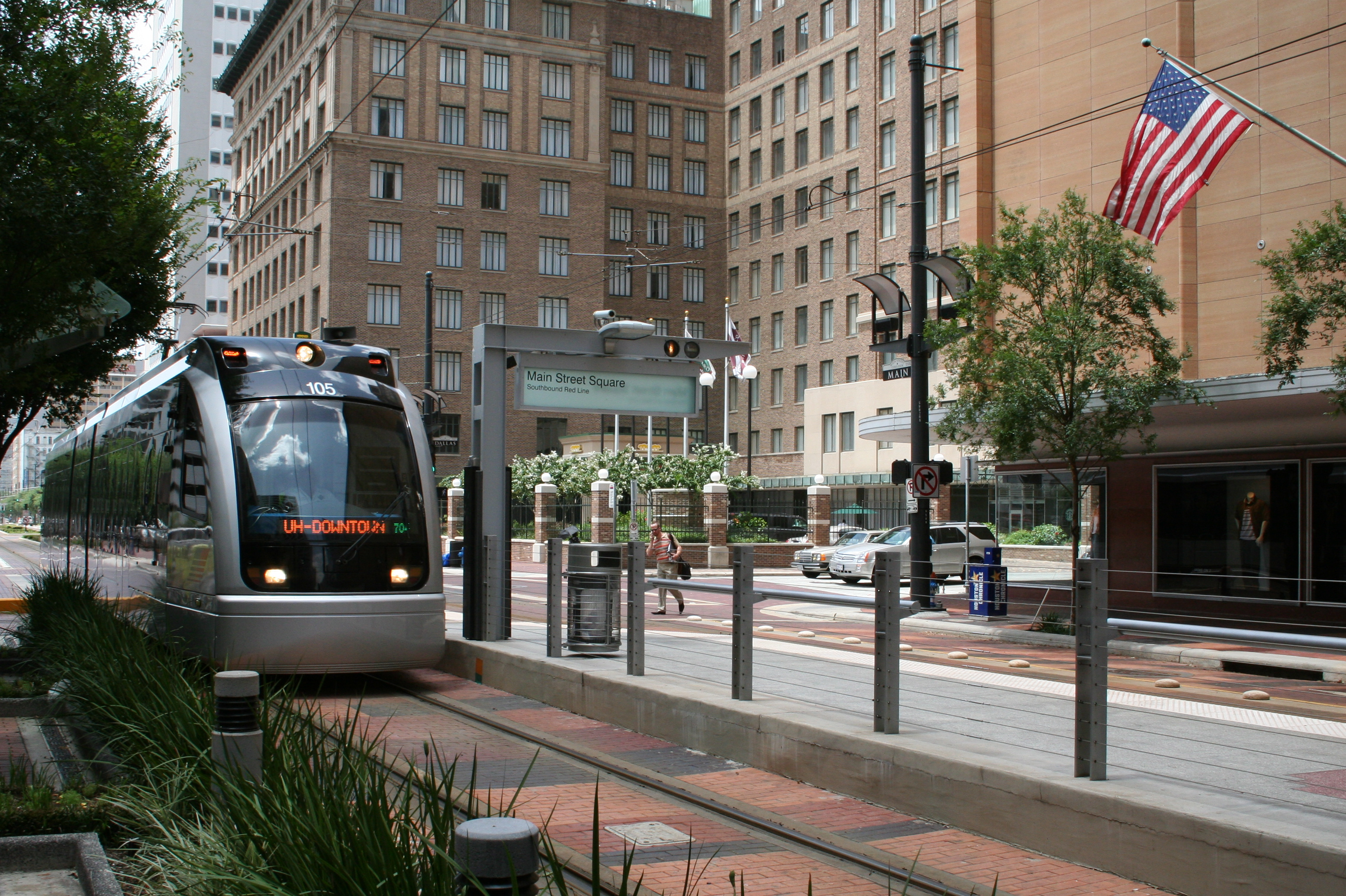
METRORail on Main Street in Downtown Houston

The miles traveled by passenger vehicles in the United States fell by 3.6% in 2008, while the number of trips taken on mass transit increased by 4.0%. At least part of the drop in urban driving can be explained by the 4% increase in the use of public transportation.

Most medium-sized cities have some sort of local public transportation, usually a network of fixed bus routes. Among larger cities many of the older cities also have metro rail systems (also known as heavy rail in the United States) and/or extensive light rail systems, while the newer cities found in the Sun Belt either have modest light rail systems or have no intracity rail at all.

=== Legislation ===
On June 26, 2008, the House passed the Saving Energy Through Public Transportation Act (H.R. 6052), which gives grants to |mass transit authorities to lower fares for commuters pinched at the pump and expand transit services. The bill also:

- Requires that all Federal agencies offer their employees transit pass transportation fringe benefits. Federal agencies within the National Capital Region have successful transit pass benefits programs.
- Increases the federal cost-share of grants for construction of additional parking facilities at the end of subway lines from 80 to 100% to cover an increase in the number of people taking mass transit.
- Creates a pilot program for vanpool demonstration projects in urban and rural areas.
- Increases federal help for local governments to purchase alternative fuel buses, locomotives, and ferries from 90 to 100%.

== Water transportation ==
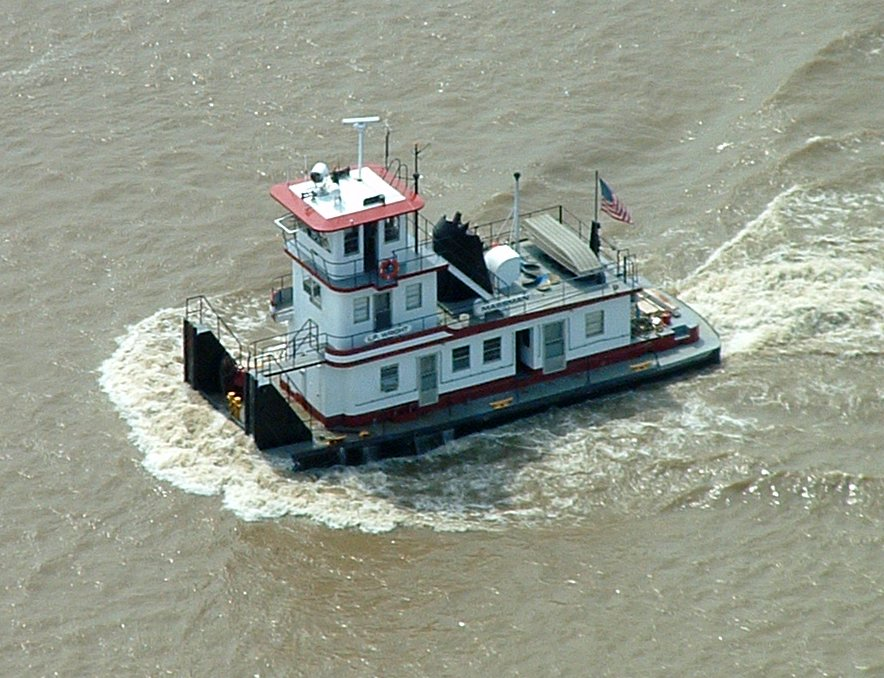
A tugboat on the Mississippi River seen from St. Louis

Water transport is largely used for freight. Fishing and pleasure boats are numerous, and passenger service connects many of the nation's islands and remote coastal areas, crosses lakes, rivers, and harbors, and provides alternative access to Alaska which bypasses Canada. Several major seaports in the United States include New York City on the east coast, New Orleans and Houston on the gulf coast, and Los Angeles on the west coast. The interior of the U.S. also has major shipping channels, via the Great Lakes Waterway, St. Lawrence Seaway and the Mississippi River System. Freight on the Mississippi River system is carried on barges pushed by approximately 8000 "towboats" and largely consists of bulk goods, such as petrochemicals, grain and cement.

Many U.S. ports are served by cruise ships. Popular destinations include the Caribbean, the Mexican Riviera, Hawaii and the Inside Passage to Alaska. Automobile ferries operate in many locations where bridges are impractical and in congested metropolitan areas, including New York City and San Francisco Bay. Ferries also operate in Sounds that have populated areas surrounding it, such as Puget Sound. Washington State Ferries operates the ferries in Puget Sound and has the second largest ferry fleet in the world. Washington State ferries even offer ferries from Anacortes, Washington to Sidney, British Columbia.

=== Waterways ===
The United States has 25,482 miles (41,009 km) of navigable inland channels (rivers and canals), exclusive of the Great Lakes. Out of this 12,006 miles (19,322 km) is used in commerce. About 15,000 miles (24,000 km) of the Mississippi River System are presently navigable, although not all is used for commerce. The Saint Lawrence Seaway of 2,342 miles (3,769 km), including the Saint Lawrence River of 1,900 miles (3,100 km), is shared with Canada.

=== Ports and harbors ===
United States ports and harbors include:

- Anchorage, Alaska
- Baltimore, Maryland
- Boston, Massachusetts
- Charleston, South Carolina
- Chicago, Illinois
- Christiansted, U.S. Virgin Islands
- Detroit, Michigan
- Erie, Pennsylvania
- Gulfport, Mississippi
- Hampton Roads, Virginia
- Honolulu, Hawaii
- Houston, Texas
- Jacksonville, Florida
- Long Beach, California
- Los Angeles, California
- Miami, Florida
- Mobile, Alabama
- New Orleans, Louisiana
- Newark-New York City
- Pago Pago, American Samoa
- Philadelphia, Pennsylvania
- Pittsburgh, Pennsylvania
- Port Canaveral, Florida
- Portland, Oregon
- Providence, Rhode Island
- Oakland, California
- Sacramento, California
- Saipan, Northern Mariana Islands
- San Diego, California
- San Juan, Puerto Rico
- Savannah, Georgia
- Seattle, Washington
- Tacoma, Washington
- Tampa, Florida
- Toledo, Ohio
- Valdez, Alaska

=== Merchant marine ===
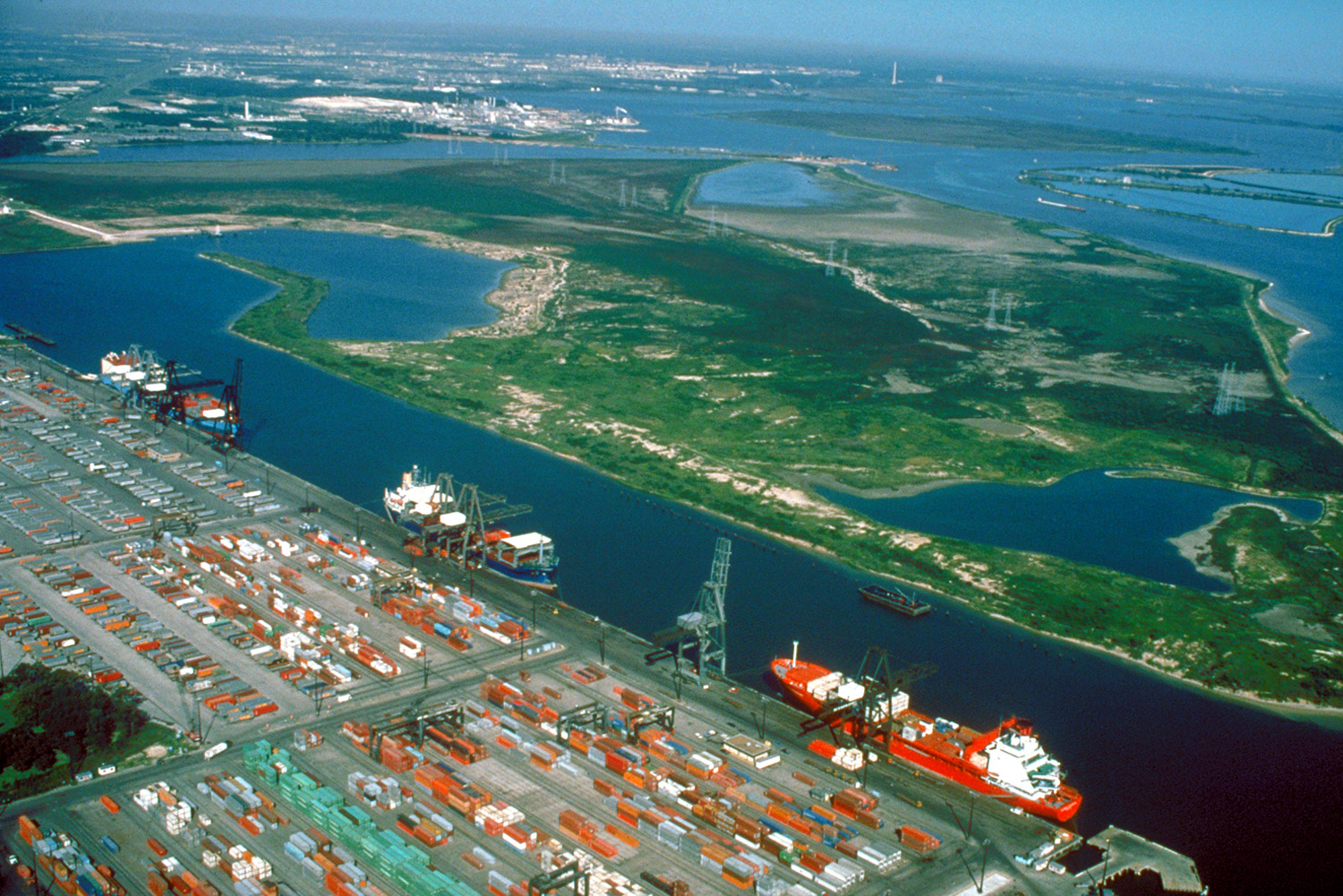
The Barbours Cut Terminal at the Port of Houston, one of the world's largest ports

Most U.S. exports and imports are on foreign ships. The 1920 Jones Act bars foreign ships from trade within the United States, thus creating a domestic "Jones Act fleet". Deck officers and ship's engineers of U.S.-flagged ships are usually trained at one of the established maritime academies.

== Military ==
The federal military has a dedicated system of bases with runways, aircraft, watercraft, conventional cars and trucks, and armored and special-purpose vehicles. During times of war, it may commandeer private infrastructure and vehicles as authorized by Congress and the President.

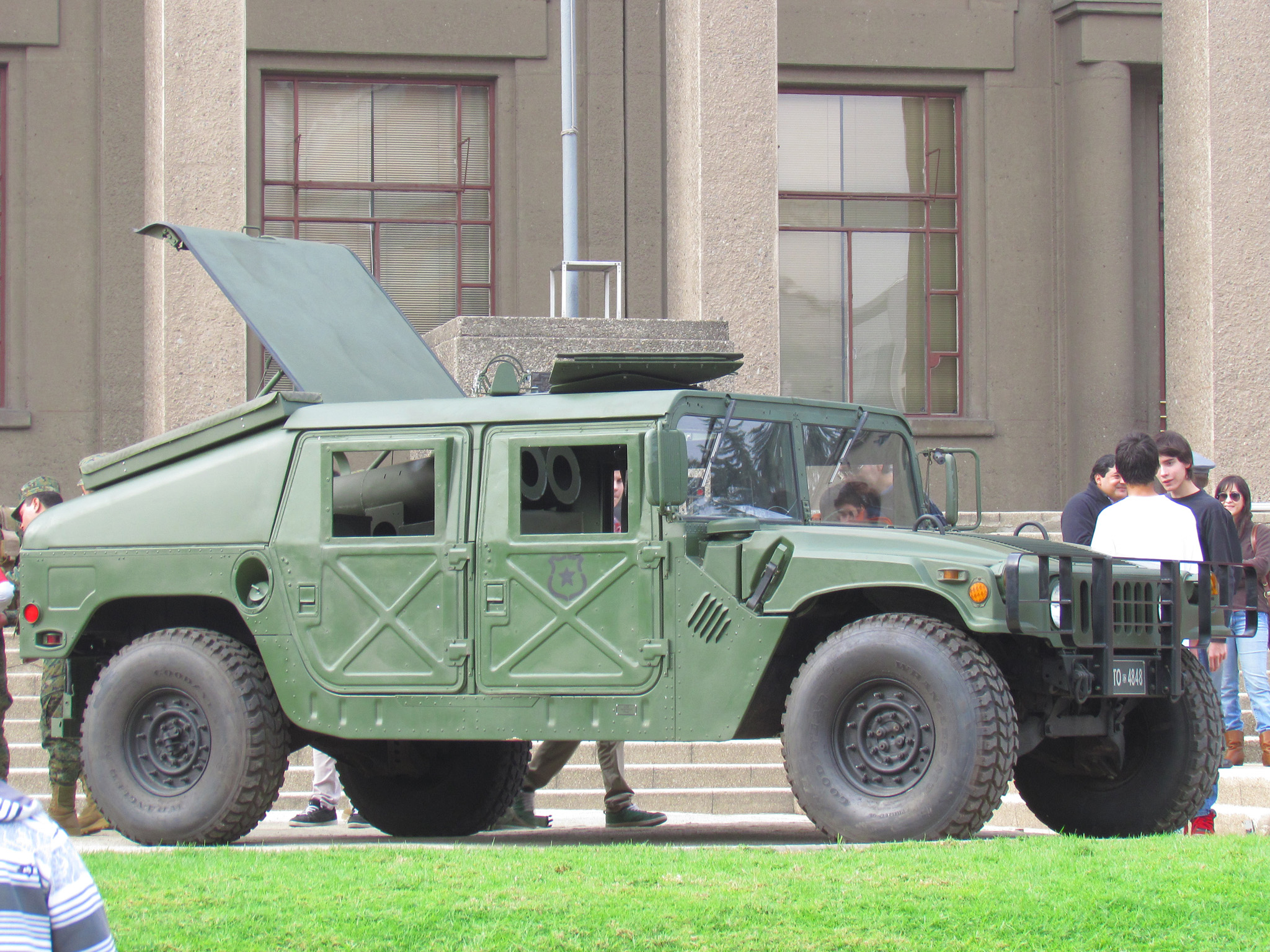
a Humvee military vehicle

== Pipeline statistics ==
- Petroleum products: 224,620 km
- Natural gas: 548,665 km (2006)

== Policy ==
As the population of the world increases, cities grow in size and population – according to the United Nations, 55% of the world's population live in cities, and by 2050 this number is expected to rise to 68%. Public transportation policy must evolve to meet the changing priorities of the urban world. The institution of policy enforces order in transportation, which is by nature chaotic as people attempt to travel from one place to another as fast as possible. This policy helps to reduce accidents and save lives.

=== Pedestrian ===
A key component of a suitable urban environment is support for pedestrian traffic, including people on foot as well as human propelled vehicles like bikes, skateboards, and scooters. Pedestrian policy is implemented at the state level, but consistent across states is the fact that the pedestrian has the right-of-way. If someone on foot is crossing the street, legally or illegally, any vehicular traffic is required to stop—under no circumstance does a driver have a right to hit a pedestrian. The exact details with respect to when a vehicle has to stop differ between the states, some requiring that all vehicles at an intersection yield to a pedestrian, while others requiring only those vehicles perpendicular to the motion of the crossing to stop. California requires all vehicles at an intersection to yield to a pedestrian walking in any direction.

There are also rules for pedestrian conduct. Though they have the right-of-way, pedestrians are not permitted to leave a curb into a crosswalk close enough to a vehicle to “constitute hazard.” Pedestrians must also yield to mass transit like light-rail cars and trains, as these forms of transportation operate on a schedule and are often moving too quickly to yield to a pedestrian. Pedestrians are also not permitted to delay traffic more than necessary while in a crosswalk. When not using a crosswalk, pedestrians must yield their right-of-way to vehicles who are close enough to constitute hazard. One of the issues with this kind of policy is how vague it is. A pedestrian is expected to determine on the fly what “constitutes hazard,” which can create dangerous situations leading to pedestrian injury or even death. As technology continues to advance, embedded technology like sensors and computer chips in vehicles should be able to process data very quickly and thus prevent collisions, as discussed in the Internet section found below.

=== Complete Street ===
A complete street is a roadway that is safe for people of any ability or age utilizing any form of transportation. The concept revolves around the fact that streets are communal spaces, so anyone has a right to access them. In order to ensure universal safety, however, policy exists to ensure that these complete streets are maintained and utilized properly.

- Funding policies refer to the process with which state funds are allocated to the creation of pedestrian areas, bike lanes, and street markings.
- Planning policies refer to the process by which a street is expanded to include support for human powered transportation and how * this expansion fits into the urban planning as a whole.
- Engineering and design policies refer to the implementation of a complete street, including how to differentiate between bike lanes and car lanes.
- Maintenance policies refer to the process with which state funds are allocated to street maintenance to ensure that they remain safe places of travel.
- Use policies refer to the proper use of a complete street to allow efficient transportation for all.

Other supporting policies indirectly related to complete streets include parking policies and vehicle restrictions. Complete streets are an important development for urban transportation because they equally support all forms of transportation, enforce safety, and ensure that everyone can navigate the busy city streets to arrive at their destination as fast as possible.

=== Traffic flow ===
In order to ensure that traffic flow is uniformly dispersed across roadways and does not interfere with existing pedestrian and public transportation infrastructure, traffic flow policy is put in place in order to get everyone to their destination in the most efficient way possible. Traffic flow policy includes everything from how spaced out two cars should be on a highway to which cars have priority at stop signs and street lights to the proper use of bus, taxi, and carpool lanes.

=== Parking lots ===
Parking policy has a strong impact on the transportation mode. Efforts to reduce the amount of space dedicated to parking are diminishing the dependence on cars, encouraging walking, biking, public transit, lowering the cost of housing and increase the amount of housing units that can be built in the city territory. Such efforts has been taken in different cities in California and in September 2023 the state abolished the requirement of minimum parking space "within a half-mile of major public transit stops". From 2017 more than 200 towns and cities in the USA abolished or changed the requirement for parking minimum. Those include Portland, Minneapolis, Austin. As of 2 November 2023, Austin (Texas) is the biggest city in the USA that did it. Some cities including Nashville, begun to impose parking maximum.

== Funding ==
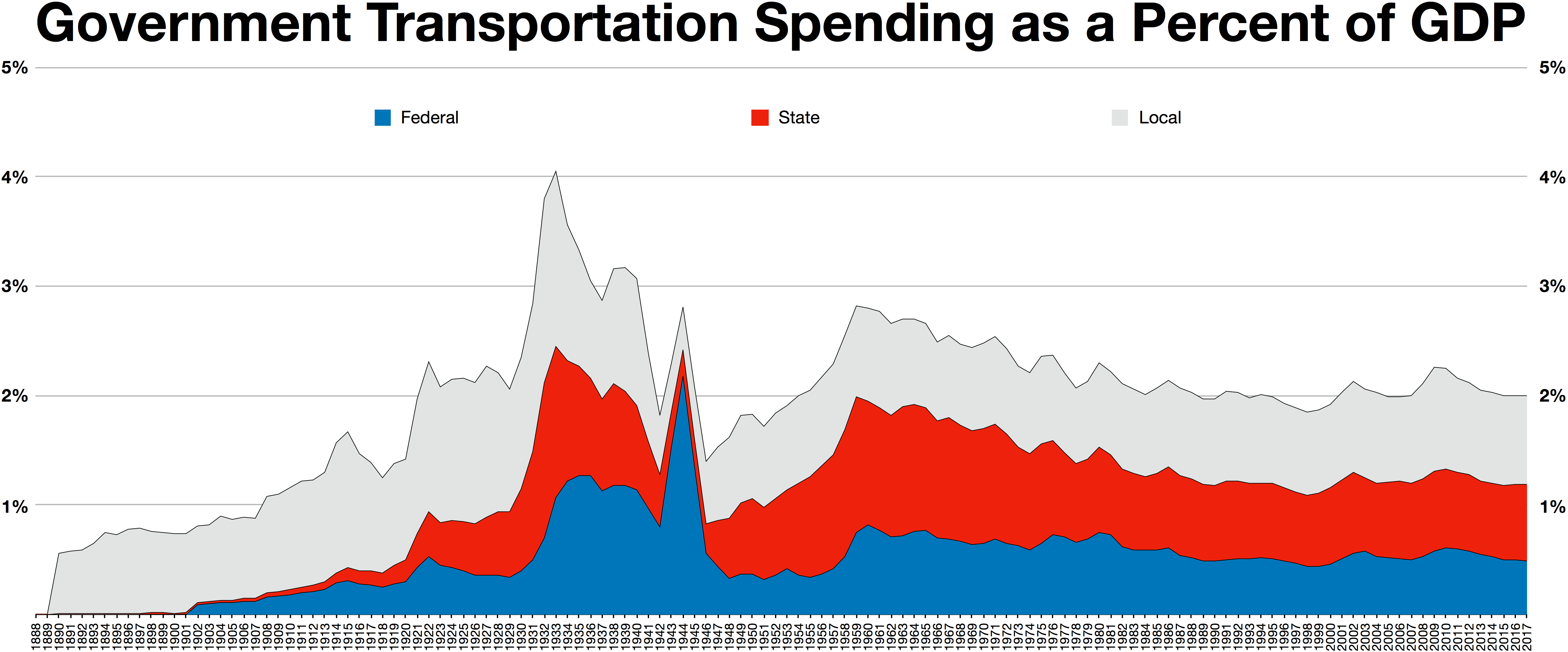
Federal, State, and Local spending on transportation as a percent of GDP

Federal, state, and local tax revenues support upkeep of most roads, which are generally free to drivers. There are also some toll roads and toll bridges. Most other forms of transportation charge a fee for use as they are not given much, if any, tax support by Congress.

Government funding of transportation exists at many levels. Federal funding for highway, rail, bus, water, air, and other forms of transportation is allocated by Congress for several years at a time. The current authorization bill is the Safe, Accountable, Flexible, Efficient Transportation Equity Act: A Legacy for Users (SAFETEA-LU), which runs from 2005 to 2009. A Congressionally chartered committee is considering future funding issues.

Though earmarks are often made for specific projects, the allocation of most federal dollars is controlled by metropolitan planning organizations (MPOs) and state governments. Usually "matching" funds are required from local sources. All projects have a sponsoring agency that will receive the funding from the various federal and local sources, and be responsible for implementing the project directly or through contracts. Large projects require a Major Investment Study' and both a draft and final Environmental Impact Review. A patchwork of federal laws and accounts govern the allocation of federal transportation dollars, most of which is reserved for capital projects, not operating expenses. Some roads are federally designated as part of the National Highway System and get preferential funding as a result, but there are few federally maintained roads outside of Washington, D.C., and national parks.

State governments are sovereign entities which use their powers of taxation both to match federal grants, and provide for local transportation needs. Different states have different systems for dividing responsibility for funding and maintaining road and transit networks between the state department of transportation, counties, municipalities, and other entities. Cities or counties are typically responsible for local roads, financed with block grants and local property taxes, and the state is responsible for major roads that receive state and federal designations. Many mass transit agencies are quasi-independent and subsidized branches of a state, county, or city government.

== Economic impact ==
According to the U.S. Department of Transportation (DOT): "Transportation's vital importance to the U.S. economy is underscored by the fact that more than $1 out of every $10 produced in the U.S. gross domestic product is related to transportation activity. This includes all aspects of transportation, including the movement of goods and the purchase of all transportation-related products and services as well as the movement of people". Employment in the transportation and material moving industry accounted for 7.4% of all employment, and was the 5th largest employment group in the United States.

The United States invests 0.6% of its GDP on transportation annually.

== Environmental impacts ==
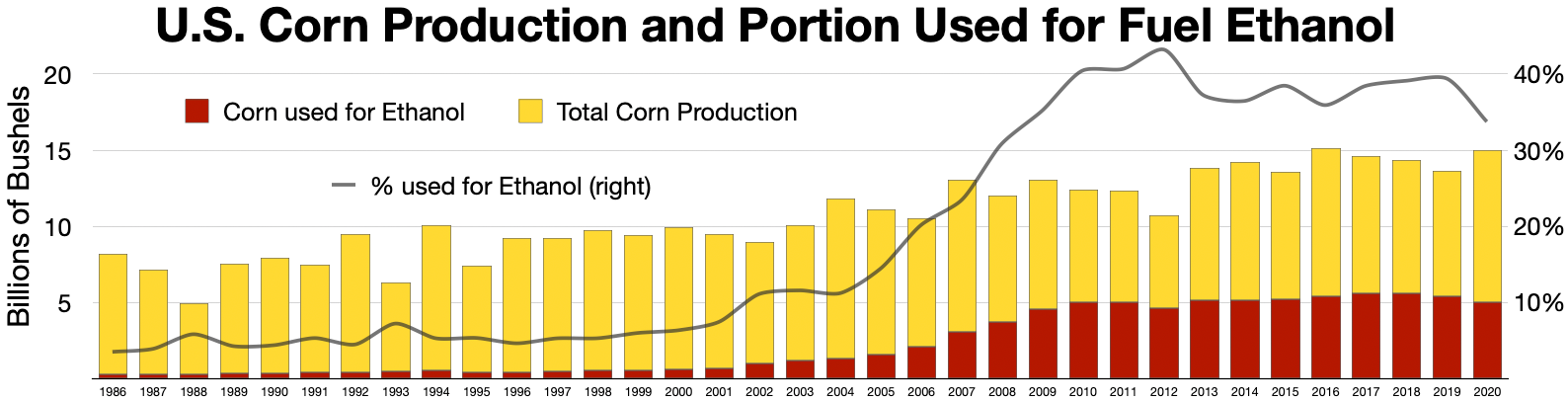
Corn vs Ethanol production in the United States Total corn production (bushels) (left) Corn used for Ethanol fuel (bushels) (left) Percent of corn used for Ethanol (right)

Two-thirds of U.S. oil consumption is due to the transportation sector. The Energy Independence and Security Act of 2007 has an impact on U.S. Energy Policy. The United States, an important export country for food stocks, converted 18% of its grain output to ethanol in 2008. Across the United States, 25% of the whole corn crop went to ethanol in 2007. The percentage of corn going to biofuel is expected to go up. In 2006, U.S. Senators introduced the BioFuels Security Act, which would mandate the production of dual-fuel vehicles and the sale of E85 ethanol fuel.

=== Greenhouse gas emissions ===
Greenhouse gas emissions in the U.S., arranged by economic sector. About 10% of the transportation-based emissions was emitted by air travel.

Burning fossil fuels like gasoline and diesel releases carbon dioxide, a greenhouse gas. The buildup of greenhouse gases causes the Earth’s lower atmosphere to warm, changing Earth's climate. From 1990 to 2022 in the U.S., emissions from transportation increased more in absolute terms than any other sector.

Transportation led U.S. greenhouse gas emissions in 2022 with 28.4%, followed by electric power (24.9%), industry (22.9%), agriculture (10%), commercial (7.3%) and residential (6.2%). The EPA reported 1.8 billion metric tons of carbon dioxide-equivalent was emitted by the transportation sector in 2022, with carbon dioxide from fossil fuel combustion constituting 97.2% of the emissions. Of the 1.8 billion metric tons emitted in 2019, 58% was emitted by personal vehicles, 25% was emitted by commercial trucks and busses, 10% was emitted by air travel, 3% is emitted by pipeline, 2% is by rail, and 2% is by water.

== See also ==
- Transportation
- United States Department of Transportation
- Transportation in Canada
- Transportation in Mexico
- List of U.S. cities with high transit ridership
- List of countries by vehicles per capita
- American Public Transportation Association
- History of rail transport in the United States
- Plug-in electric vehicles in the United States
- Road signs in the United States
- Timeline of United States railway history
- Transportation safety in the United States
- Timeline of transportation technology

=== Location-specific ===
- Transportation in Atlanta
- Transportation in Boston
- Transportation in Buffalo, New York
- Transportation in Charlotte, North Carolina
- Transportation in Chicago
- Transportation in Cincinnati
- Transportation in Dallas
- Transportation in Los Angeles
- Transportation in St. Louis
- Transportation in Guam
- Transportation in Hampton Roads
- Transportation in Houston
- Transportation in Indianapolis
- Transportation in the Inland Empire
- Transportation in Las Vegas
- Transportation on Long Island
- Transportation in Louisville, Kentucky
- Transportation in Memphis, Tennessee
- Transportation in metropolitan Detroit
- Transportation in Miami
- Transportation in New England
- Transportation in New York City
- Transportation in Norfolk, Virginia
- Transportation in Omaha
- Transportation in Pittsburgh
- Transportation in Portland, Oregon
- Transportation in Philadelphia
- Transportation in Puerto Rico
- Transportation in Richmond, Virginia
- Transportation in the Sacramento metropolitan area
- Transportation in Salt Lake City
- Transportation in San Diego
- Transportation in the San Francisco Bay Area
- Transportation in Seattle
- Transportation in the United States Virgin Islands
- Transportation in Washington, D.C.
- Transportation in Williamsburg, Virginia

=== Funding ===
==== All modes ====
- Surface Transportation and Uniform Relocation Assistance Act
- Intermodal Surface Transportation Efficiency Act
- Transportation Equity Act for the 21st Century
- Safe, Accountable, Flexible, Efficient Transportation Equity Act: A Legacy for Users
- American Recovery and Reinvestment Act of 2009

==== Mass transportation ====
- Urban Mass Transportation Act of 1964
- Urban Mass Transportation Act of 1970
- National Mass Transportation Assistance Act
- Project Independence
