= Rufus Reid (planter) =

American plantation owner and politician

- Born: 1797; Catawba Springs, Lincoln County, North Carolina, US
- Died: 1854 (aged 56–57); Mount Mourne, North Carolina, US
- Occupations: Planter, businessman, politician
- Title: Major
- Spouse(s): Nancy (Latta) Reid; Betsy (Latta Davidson) Reid; Isabella (Torrance Smith) Reid
- Children: 10

Rufus Reid (1797–1854) was an American plantation owner, businessman and politician from North Carolina.

== Biography ==
=== Early life ===
Rufus Reid was born in 1797 in Catawba Springs Lincoln County, North Carolina. His father, Captain John Reid, served in the American Revolutionary War of 1775-1783 and owned much of the land in Catawba Springs. His mother was named Sara.

=== Career ===
He worked as a merchant and plantation owner in Rowan County, North Carolina. In 1831, he moved to Iredell County, North Carolina and commissioned the construction of mansion on his Mount Mourne Plantation in Mount Mourne, North Carolina. The mansion is now listed on the National Register of Historic Places. By 1850, he owned eighty-four slaves and became the second largest slave owner in Iredell County. He grew corn, wheat, and cotton.

As early as 1831, he served as the postmaster of Mount Mourne. He was still serving in this capacity in 1841. He was elected as a member of the Iredell County Court. Additionally, he was elected to the North Carolina House of Commons in 1842 and 1844.

He donated a stipend to the minister at Centre Presbyterian Church in Mount Mourne.

=== Personal life ===
He married three times. His first wife was Nancy (Latta) Reid, daughter of James Latta (1755–1837), owner of the Latta Plantation in Huntersville, North Carolina. They had three daughters:

- Mary Jane Reid Little (1831–1905). She married Colonel Benjamin Franklin Little (1830–1880), who owned Carlisle Plantation in Richmond County, North Carolina.
- Sallie Reid (Reid).
- Nancy "Nannie" Reid Houston.

After she died, he married Betsy (Latta Davidson) Reid, sister of his first wife and widow of Benjamin Davidson, owner of Oak Lawn, a plantation located in Huntersville, North Carolina, now listed on the National Register of Historic Places. They had one daughter:

- Elizabeth Eugenie "Bettie" Reid Torrance.

After she died, he married Isabella Torrance Smith of Cedar Grove, another plantation located in Huntersville and listed on the National Register of Historic Places. She was the widow of Franklin C. Smith. They had six children:

- Emma Catherine Reid.
- James Rufus Reid. He served in the Confederate States Army during the American Civil War of 1861-1865 and died in battle in Virginia.
- Addie Isabella Reid.
- John Hugh Reid.
- Lucy Andrews Reid.
- Franklin Samuel Reid.

He died in 1854 in Mount Mourne, North Carolina.
