= Coddle Creek Associate Reformed Presbyterian Church =

Historic site in Iredell County, North Carolina, US

- Coddle Creek Associate Reformed Presbyterian Church, Session House and Cemetery
- U.S. National Register of Historic Places
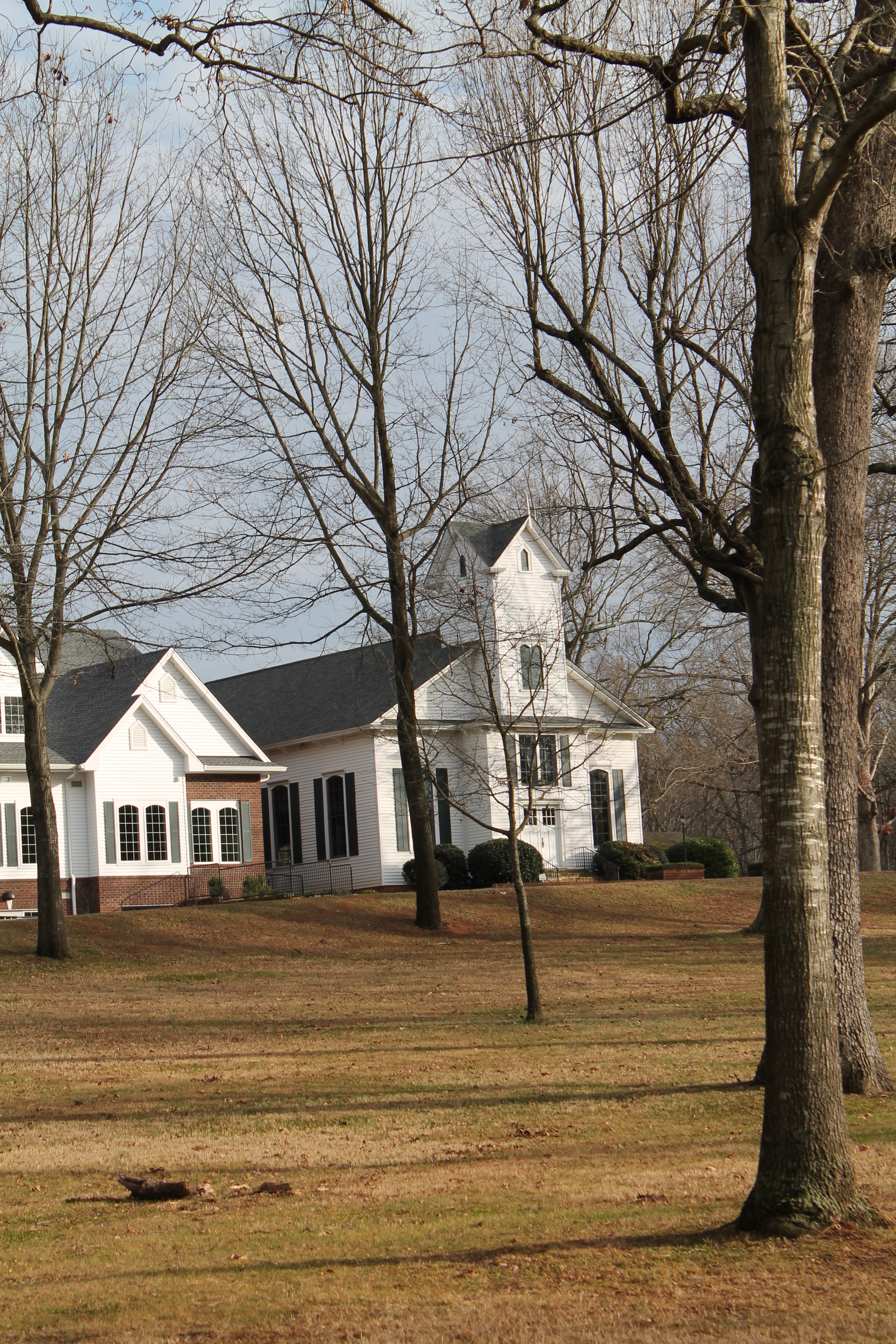

- Location within North Carolina Location within the United States
- Location: SR 1146, near Mount Mourne, North Carolina
- Coordinates: 35°30′37″N 80°46′3″W
- Area: 14.5 acres (5.9 ha)
- Built: 1884
- Architectural style: Italianate, Late Italianate
- MPS: Iredell County MRA
- NRHP reference No.: 80002864
- Added to NRHP: November 24, 1980

Coddle Creek Associate Reformed Presbyterian Church, Session House and Cemetery is a historic Associate Reformed Presbyterian church located near Mooresville in Iredell County, North Carolina, United States.

The first church building was constructed in 1753 and destroyed by fire in 1839. Its replacement was destroyed by fire in 1884 and the current structure was built. The church building is a one-story, three bay by five bay, Late Italianate style frame building. It features an entrance tower with louvered vents, four cross gables with wooden finials at the peak, and bracketed eaves. Also on the property is the contributing session house, built about 1884, and the church cemetery with about 250 gravestones.

It was added to the National Register of Historic Places in 1980.
