= Woodlawn School (Mooresville, North Carolina) =

School in North Carolina, United States

Location
- 135 Woodlawn School Loop; Mooresville, North Carolina 28115; United States; 35°31′03″N 80°50′03″W

Information
- Type: Private
- Established: 2002 (24 years ago)
- CEEB code: 342699
- Head of school: Holly Honeycutt
- Enrollment: 270+
- Colors: Green and white
- Athletics: North Carolina Independent Schools Athletic Association (NCISAA)
- Athletics conference: SPAA (varsity), WPAA (middle school)
- Mascot: Trailblazer
- Website: www.woodlawnschool.org

Woodlawn School is a private independent school at Wood Lawn in Mooresville, North Carolina in Iredell County, north of Davidson, North Carolina. Founded in 2002, it has 270+ students in grades Pre-K through 12. The Head of School is Holly Honeycutt, who joined Woodlawn's staff in 2015. Woodlawn was accredited in 2009 by the Southern Association of Colleges and Schools and the Southern Association of Independent Schools and was re-accredited in 2014.

== History ==
Woodlawn School was founded in 2002, on a historic piece of property (Wood Lawn) in the burgeoning Lake Norman area. The historic planter's home was originally built in 1836 and is listed on the National Register of Historic Places. That home was renovated in 2003, named Stinson Hall in honor of its original owner, and now serves as the school's administration building. The school's first major building project, completed in 2008 at a cost of $2.8 million, was the construction of an upper school classroom building (Woods Hall) and a gymnasium/auditorium (known as the Red Barn). In 2010, a $1.1 million project was completed which provided 4 additional classrooms (Van Buren Hall) and a multipurpose room/kitchen (The Lodge). In 2016, the school completed construction on the Alumni Track and Field complex, which includes a certified 400-meter, eight-lane track, high jump pit, pole vault pit, two long jump pits, shot put area, and discus area. The interior of the track includes a natural grass soccer field built to NCAA standards.

== Individual achievements ==
2010 marked Woodlawn's first graduation ceremony. Despite its small size and young age, Woodlawn students have already qualified for prestigious awards (52 AP Scholars, 14 National Merit Commended Scholars, 1 National Merit Scholarship Winner, 1 National Achievement Scholarship Winner).

== Academics ==
The school year is divided into 3 trimesters, during which students in grades 6–12 generally take five core courses (English, History, Math, Science, and Spanish) in addition to 2–3 enrichment courses. In upper school, 9 Advanced Placement (AP) courses are offered. The school's drama company, the Red Barn Players, performs two major productions each year. Woodlawn Schools mission is to "produce independent lifelong learners who are responsible, contributing members of a diverse global society."

== Athletics ==
Woodlawn is a member of the Southern Piedmont Athletic Association for Varsity and Middle School sports (cross country, soccer, volleyball, basketball, swimming, golf, tennis, and track & field). The school won its first NCISAA 1A state championship in Varsity Boys Cross Country in 2014 and claimed consecutive titles in 2015 and 2016. The Varsity Girls Cross Country team also won the NCISAA 1A state championship in 2015, along with the Varsity Girls Soccer team.

== Summer camps ==
Woodlawn School offers summer camps every year open to students regardless of where they attend school. Camps begin on June 9 and are active until August 1st with the exception of the week of July 4. The various camps are offered to students ranging from Pre-K to Eighth grade, each camp is targeted toward a specific age range. Woodlawn Schools camps include academic, athletic, creative, preparation, and outdoor camps.

== See also ==
- A different Woodlawn School in Mebane, North Carolina, also listed on the National Register
