= Wood Lawn (Mount Mourne, North Carolina) =

Historic house in North Carolina, United States

- U.S. National Register of Historic Places
- Location within North Carolina Location within the United States
- Location: SR 1138, near Mount Mourne, North Carolina
- Coordinates: 35°31′5″N 80°50′5″W
- Area: 14.3 acres (5.8 ha)
- Built: 1836
- Architectural style: Greek Revival, Federal
- MPS: Iredell County MRA
- NRHP reference No.: 80002866
- Added to NRHP: November 24, 1980

listed on the National Register of Historic Places. Located near Mount Mourne, Iredell County, North Carolina 1-mile (1.6 km) north of Davidson, NorthWood Lawn, also known as Woodlawn, is a plantation house built in 1836 and Carolina, the house was built about 1840 and is an example of the Federal-Greek Revival style of architecture often built in the Piedmont area during this period. The house was built by Dr. George Washington Stinson, one of the first trustees of Davidson College, which was founded in 1837.

== History ==
The original structure consisted of 8 rooms (each with its own fireplace and mantle) on 2 levels off center hallways. The 2 1/2-story staircase features a walnut, spiral-turned handrail believed imported from Charleston, South Carolina. Tradition relates that Dr. Stinson's home was popular among the Davidson College students, not only because he had several eligible daughters, but also because he permitted square dancing, which was strongly discouraged by the Presbyterians of the day. Stinson was a member of Centre Presbyterian Church, where he and his wife are buried. Their son, Edgar Burett Stinson, graduated from Davidson in 1856, fought in the Civil War, and then returned to the family home where he later died. The house remained in the Stinson family until the twentieth century.

In 2002, the house and its 61-acre (250,000 m^{2}) parcel were purchased for use by a new independent, private school - Woodlawn School. One year later, the house was renovated to serve as the school's administration building, and was dedicated as Stinson Hall, in honor of its builder.
