= Mount Mourne Plantation =

Historic house in North Carolina, United States

- Mount Mourne
- U.S. National Register of Historic Places
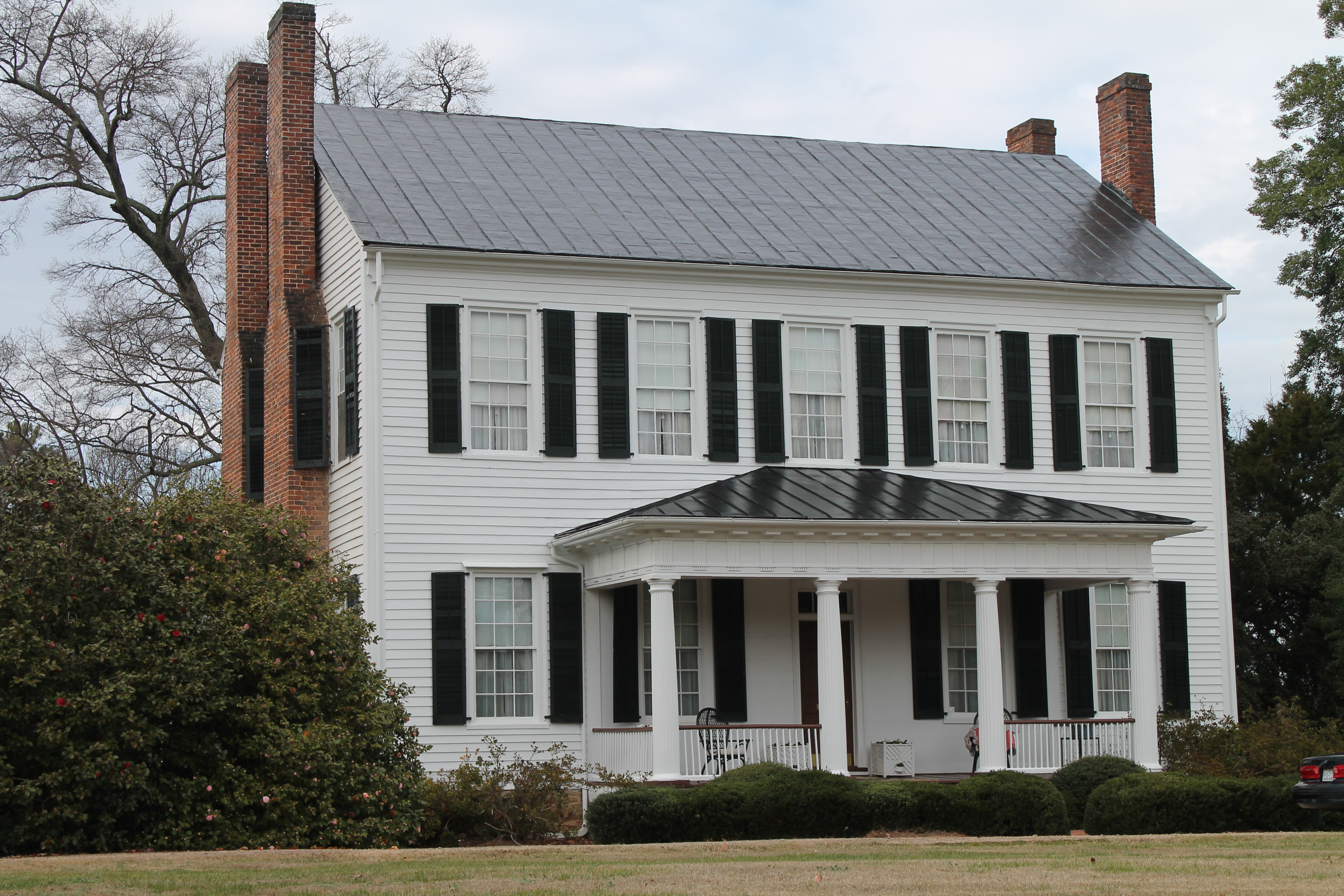
- Mount Mourne Plantation from NC Hwy 115

- Location within North Carolina Location within the United States
- Location: Off NC 115, Mount Mourne, North Carolina
- Coordinates: 35°33′6.1632″N 80°50′39.0402″W
- Area: 9 acres (3.6 ha)
- Built: 1836
- Architectural style: Greek Revival, Federal
- MPS: Iredell County MRA (AD)
- NRHP reference No.: 74001354
- Added to NRHP: October 29, 1974

Mount Mourne Plantation is a former Southern plantation and historic house located in Mount Mourne, Iredell County, North Carolina. It was built in 1836, and is a two-story, five-bay transitional Federal / Greek Revival style frame dwelling. It features a hipped roof entrance portico with four fluted Tuscan order columns.

It was added to the National Register of Historic Places in 1974.

== History ==
The plantation house was built by Major Rufus Reid (1797-1854). Cotton, wheat and corn were grown with the forced labor of as many as 88 enslaved people. In its heyday, the Plantation was one of the largest in the area, and the second largest in Iredell County. The proceeds of forced labor made Rufus Reid one of the wealthiest and most prosperous planters in not only the area, but the state as a whole.

== At present ==
It is currently privately owned, and is closed to the public. The plantation gave its name to the modern-day community of Mount Mourne, North Carolina, in which the home is located.
