= Transportation in Charlotte, North Carolina =

Transportation in the city of Charlotte, North Carolina includes a large and growing mass transit and rail system, a major international airport, and several controlled-access highways.

== Air ==
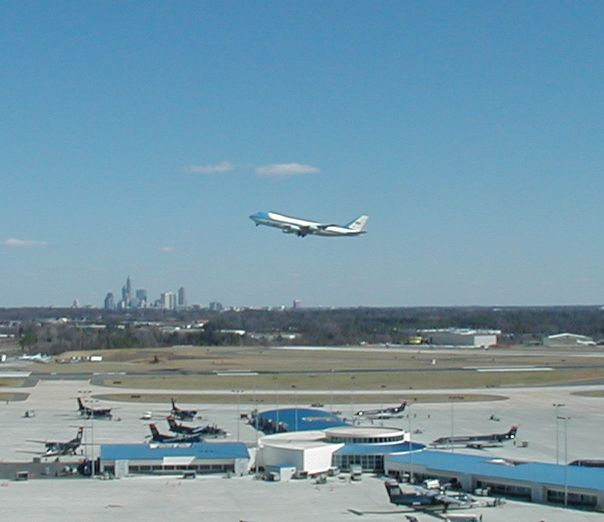
Air Force One takes off from Charlotte/Douglas International Airport, with the Charlotte skyline in the background

Charlotte/Douglas International Airport is the 11th busiest airport in the world, as measured by traffic. It is served by many domestic airlines, as well as international airlines Air Canada and Lufthansa, and is the second largest hub for American Airlines. Nonstop flights are available to many destinations across the United States, as well as flights to Canada, Central America, the Caribbean, Europe, Mexico, and South America.

== Roads and highways ==
Charlotte's central location between the population centers of the northeast and southeast has made it a transportation focal point and primary distribution center, with two major interstate highways, Interstate 85 (I-85) and I-77, intersecting near the city's center. Charlotte's beltway, designated I-485, has a total circumference of approximately 67 miles (108 km). Within the city, the I-277 loop freeway encircles Charlotte's uptown (usually referred to by its two separate sections, the John Belk Freeway and the Brookshire Freeway) while Charlotte Route 4 links major roads in a loop between I-277 and I-485.

Trade Street and Tryon Street are the central thoroughfares though Uptown Charlotte. The intersection of Trade and Tryon marks the center point of the city, dividing the city's first four wards.

Charlotte Route 4 is a partial ring road utilizing many existing two-lane roads around the south and east sides of the city. It is denoted by a pentagonal county road shield, with a green background and the city's crown logo above the number.

Other major thoroughfares include: Albemarle Road (part of NC 24 and NC 27), Arrowood Road, Atando Avenue, Beatties Ford Road, Billy Graham Parkway, Brookshire Boulevard (part of NC 16), Carson Boulevard, Central Avenue, Charlottetowne Avenue, Clanton Road, Davidson Street, East Boulevard, Eastway Drive, Elizabeth Avenue, Fairview Road, Freedom Drive (part of NC 27), Graham Street (part of U.S. Route 29 (US 29) and NC 49), Hawthorne Lane, Idlewild Road, Independence Boulevard (part of US 74 and NC 27), Johnston Road, Kenilworth Avenue, Kings Drive, LaSalle Street, Lawyers Road, Little Rock Road, Mallard Creek Road, McDowell Street (part of NC 27), Mint Street, Monroe Road, Morehead Street (part of US 29 and NC 27), Mt. Holly Road (part of NC 27), Nations Ford Road, Nevin Road, Oaklawn Avenue, Park Road, Pineville–Matthews Road (part of NC 51), The Plaza, Providence Road (part of NC 16), Queens Road, Randhiolph Road, Rea Road, Remount Road, Rozzelles Ferry Road, Runnymeade Lane, Sardis Road, Scaleybark Road, Selwyn Avenue, Sharon Road, Sharon-Amity Road, South Boulevard, Statesville Road (part of US 21), Steele Creek Road (part of NC 160), Stonewall Street, Sugar Creek Road, Sunset Road, Tremont Avenue, Tuckaseegee Road, Tyvola Road, University City Boulevard (part of NC 49), W.T. Harris Boulevard (part of NC 24), Wendover Road, West Boulevard (part of NC 160), Westinghouse Boulevard, Wilkinson Boulevard (part of US 74) and Woodlawn Road.

== Intercity rail ==
=== Passenger Rail ===
Charlotte is served daily by several Amtrak trains in each direction; two (2) long-distance services, and four (4) regional trains.

- The Crescent connects Charlotte with New York, Philadelphia, Baltimore, Washington, Charlottesville, and Greensboro to the north, and Atlanta, Birmingham and New Orleans to the south. It arrives overnight once in each direction.
- The Carolinian connects Charlotte with New York, Philadelphia, Baltimore, Washington, Richmond, Raleigh, Durham and Greensboro. Charlotte is the southern terminus, with the northbound train leaving just before the morning rush and the southbound train arriving in the evening.
- The Piedmont, a state-supported corridor service, operates as a regional companion to the Carolinian, connecting Charlotte with Raleigh, Durham and Greensboro with four trips in each direction daily. Equipment for Piedmont trains was purchased by the North Carolina Department of Transportation, and thus is significantly different from the rest of Amtrak's fleet.

The current Charlotte Amtrak station, built in 1962, is located beside the Norfolk Southern railyard, significantly north of downtown. A new centralized multimodal station, Gateway Station, is planned to serve all Amtrak, Greyhound, and some LYNX light rail services by 2027. Construction of the supporting rail infrastructure, including track, signals, and the high-level platforms, was completed in late 2022, but as of May 2024 Amtrak continues to use the older station.

=== Freight ===
Charlotte is served by 3 freight railroads: Class I railroads CSX Transportation and Norfolk Southern, and Class III short line Aberdeen, Carolina, and Western (ACWR). Norfolk Southern has the largest presence, with a large intermodal terminal located adjacent to Douglas International Airport opened in 2014 supplementing the existing railyard near downtown. CSX also operates several yards, including two Trans-Flo transload terminals, an intermodal terminal, and the relatively small Pinoca yard. The ACWR operates 3 days a week from Norfolk Southern's yard; the interchange can support up to 150 cars at a time, enabling unit trains to be handled to and from ACWR customers.

== Mass transit ==
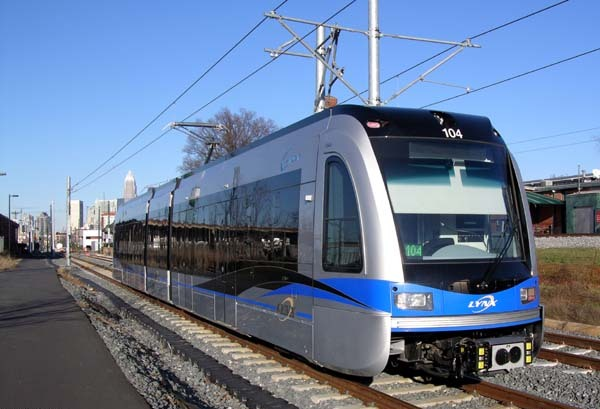
LYNX Light Rail opened in November 2007

The Charlotte Area Transit System (CATS) is the agency responsible for operating mass transit in the Charlotte Metropolitan Area.

CATS operates light rail transit, streetcar service, express shuttles, and bus service serving Charlotte and its immediate suburbs. The LYNX system comprises a 19.3-mile long north–south light rail line known as the Blue Line and a 1.5-mile streetcar line, known as the CityLYNX Gold Line. The Blue Line was extended from the original section, I-485 to Uptown, to the UNC Charlotte campus in 2018. Bus ridership has declined in the system along with a nationwide trend in ridership The 2030 Transit Corridor System Plan looks to add more light rail and bus rapid transit lines in Charlotte, as well as add commuter rail service along existing Norfolk Southern tracks to Mount Mourne.

== See also ==
- Plug-in electric vehicles in North Carolina § Charlotte
- Charlotte station (Seaboard Air Line Railroad)
