= Mount Mourne, North Carolina =

- Unincorporated community
- Location within North Carolina Location within the United States
- Coordinates: 35°32′35″N 80°50′50″W
- Country: United States
- State: North Carolina
- County: Iredell
- Elevation: 850 ft (260 m)
- Time zone: UTC-5 (Eastern (EST))
  - Summer (DST): UTC-4 (EDT)
- ZIP code: 28123
- Area codes: 704 & 980
- GNIS feature ID: 1021550

Mount Mourne is an unincorporated community in Iredell County, North Carolina, United States. Mount Mourne is located on North Carolina Highway 115, 3.5 miles (5.6 km) southwest of Mooresville. The Mount Mourne post office was originally established on April 5, 1805 with James Houston as postmaster. It has been in continuous operation since 1805 and currently has a ZIP code of 28123. The community was named by early settlers after Mourne Mountains in Northern Ireland. Rufus Reid (1787-1854) built the Mount Mourne Plantation in Mount Mourne in 1836. It is still standing.

In addition to Mount Mourne Plantation, the Centre Presbyterian Church, Session House and Cemeteries, Coddle Creek Associate Reformed Presbyterian Church, Session House and Cemetery, George Houston House, and Wood Lawn are listed on the National Register of Historic Places.
