= Centre Presbyterian Church, Session House and Cemeteries =

Historic site in Iredell County, North Carolina, US

- U.S. National Register of Historic Places
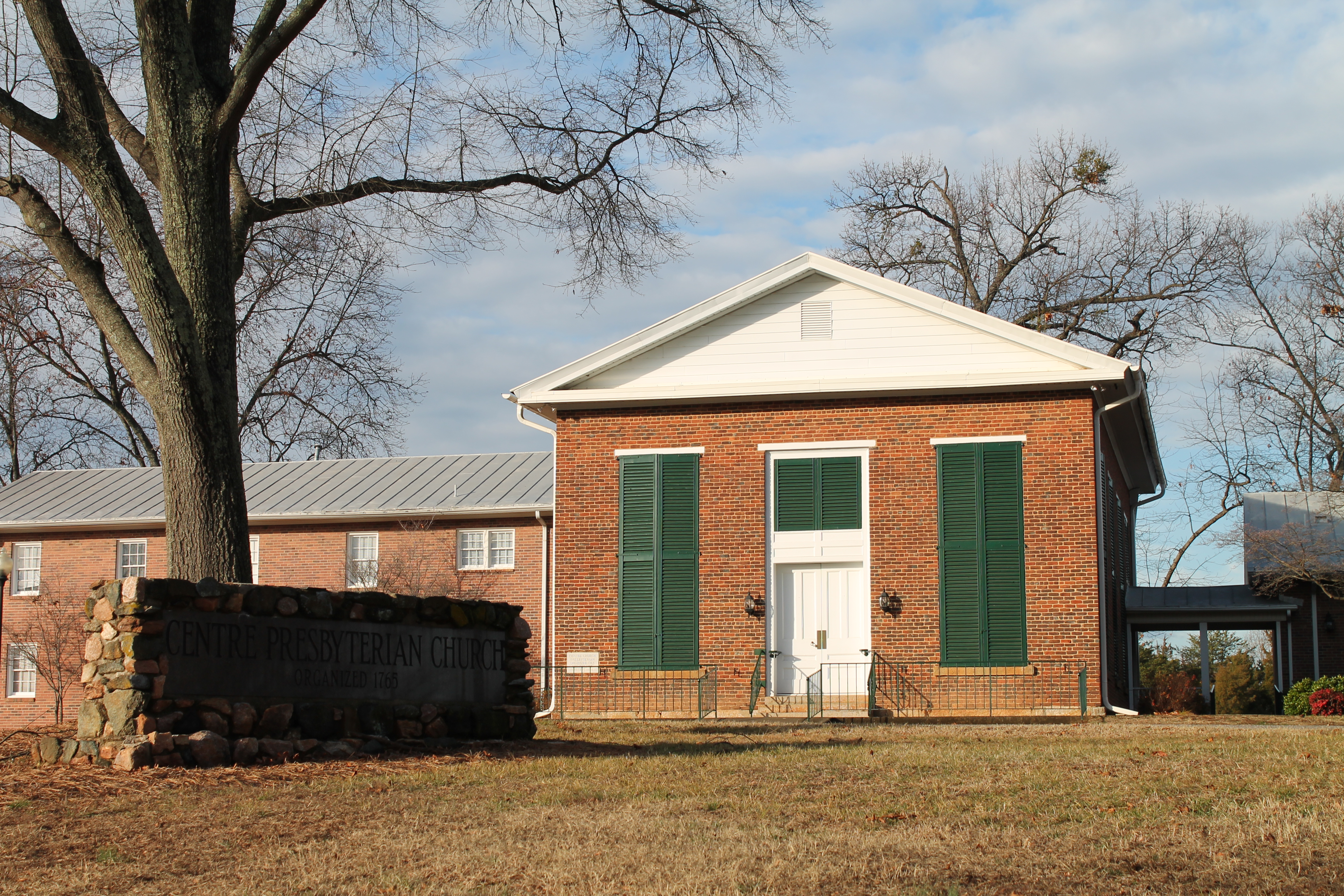
- A view of Centre Presbyterian Church

- Location within North Carolina Location within the United States
- Location: SR 1245, near Mount Mourne, North Carolina
- Coordinates: 35°33′7″N 80°51′17″W
- Area: 18 acres (7.3 ha)
- Built: 1776
- Architectural style: Greek Revival
- MPS: Iredell County MRA
- NRHP reference No.: 80002863
- Added to NRHP: November 24, 1980

Centre Presbyterian Church, Session House and Cemeteries is a historic Presbyterian church, session house, and cemetery located near Mount Mourne, Iredell County, North Carolina (Mooresville, North Carolina). The original church building was constructed in 1765, but was destroyed by fire. The current church building and session house were constructed 1854. The church is a one-story, three bay by four bay, rectangular vernacular Greek Revival-style brick church. The church's cemetery contains gravestones dating to the 18th century.

It was added to the National Register of Historic Places in 1980.

== Gallery ==
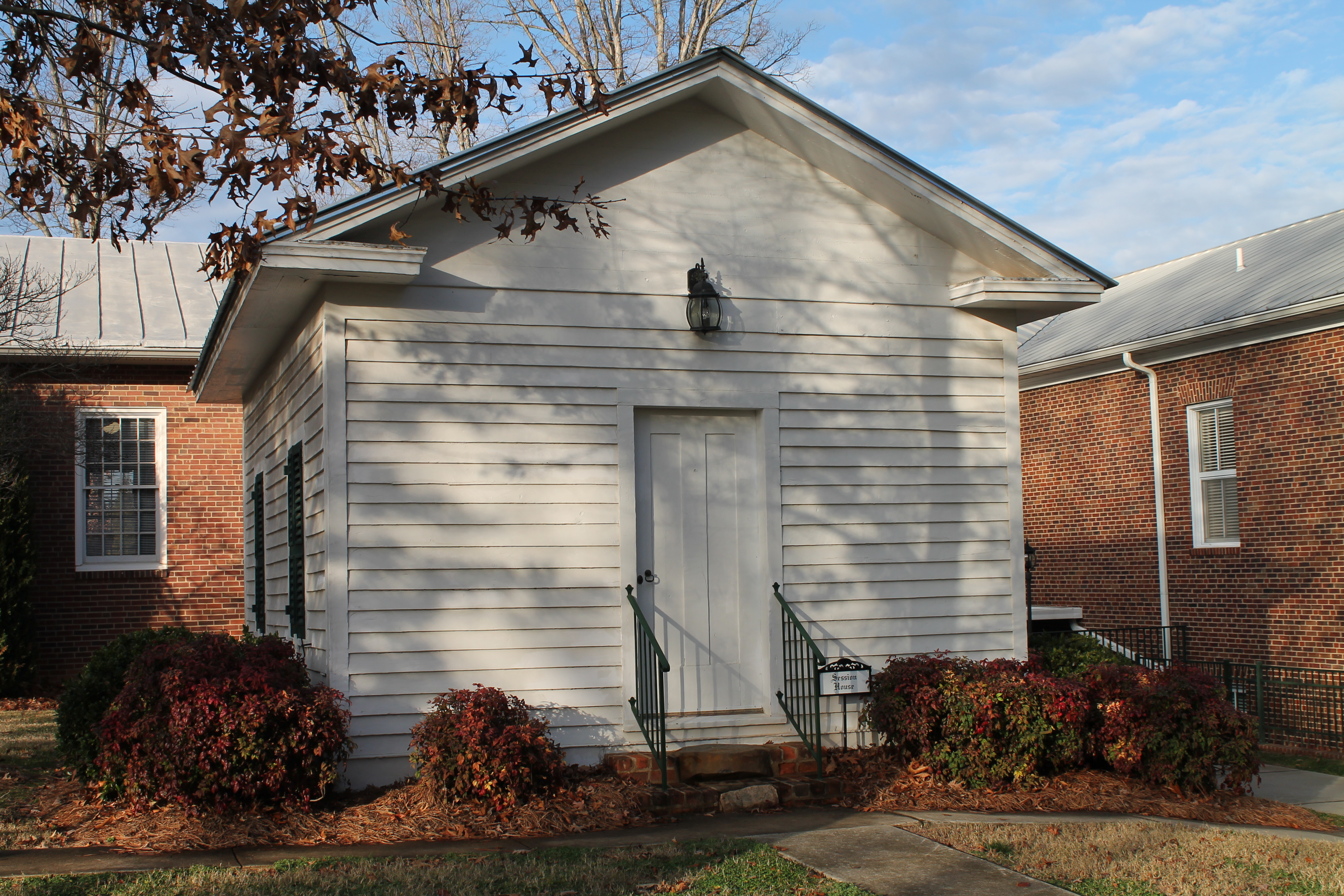
Centre Presbyterian Church's Session House (NRHP)

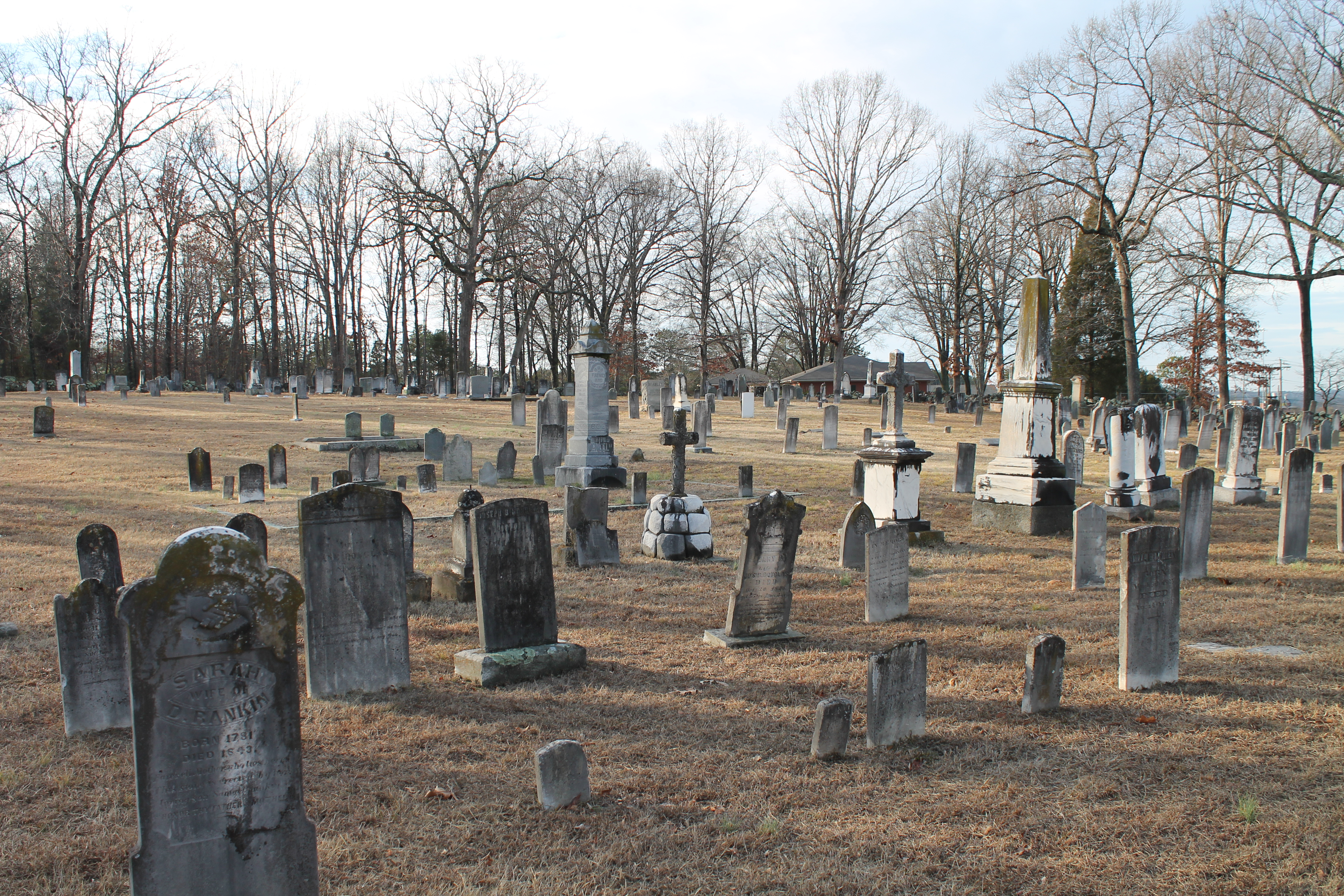
Centre Presbyterian Church Graveyard (NRHP)
