= CTR =

CTR may refer to:

== Engineering, science and technology ==
- Counter mode (CTR mode), a cryptographic mode of operation for block ciphers
- X-ray crystal truncation rod, a technique to measure properties of crystal surfaces
- Current transfer ratio, in an opto-isolator device
- Content Threat Removal, a cyber security technology that defeats content threats

== Government ==
- Cooperative Threat Reduction, an initiative to secure and dismantle weapons of mass destruction in former Soviet Union states
- Currency transaction report, a report about transactions that the Bank Secrecy Act requires U.S. financial institutions to file with the Internal Revenue Service

== Media, arts and entertainment ==
- Contemporary Theatre Review, a British academic journal of performing arts
- Crash Team Racing, Naughty Dog's 1999 video game for the Sony PlayStation
  - Crash Team Racing Nitro-Fueled, its 2019 remake

== Medicine ==
- Cardiac resynchronization therapy
- Cardio-thoracic ratio, a measure of the size of heart
- Carpal tunnel release, surgery for treating carpal tunnel syndrome
- Cervico-thoracic ratio, a measure of segmental mobility in the spine
- Clinical trials registry, an official catalog for studies about health interventions, such as drugs

== Organizations ==
- Center for Transportation Research UT Austin, a research center at the University of Texas at Austin, US
- Center for Turbulence Research, a research institute at Stanford University, US
- Correct the Record, an American political action committee which supported Hillary Clinton's 2016 presidential campaign
- Computing-Tabulating-Recording Company, a company that was renamed IBM in 1924

== Transport ==
- Aerolíneas Centauro (ICAO airline designator: CTR), an airline in Mexico
- Cattle Creek Airport (IATA airport code: CTR), an airport in Australia
- Controlled traffic region, a controlled airspace zone, typically around airports
- Carlton Trail Railway, a Saskatchewan, US shortline railway
- Chester railway station (station code), England
- Citeras railway station (station code), Indonesia

=== Automobile models ===
- Honda Civic Type R, a car manufactured by Honda
- Ruf CTR, a car by Ruf Automobile of Germany

== Other uses ==
- Click-through rate, a measure of the success of an online advertising campaign
- "Choose the right", a common Latter Day Saint saying, often found on a CTR ring
- Close target reconnaissance, a military term for scouting in extremely close proximity to the target
- Competitive trail riding, an equestrian sport
- Costa Rica, ITU country code

== See also ==
- Center (disambiguation) (Center or Centre) for which CTR is an abbreviation of several values
- Control (disambiguation) for which CTR is an abbreviation of several values
- CTRS
