= Frits Prinzen =

Dutch researcher into cardiac pacing (born 1954)

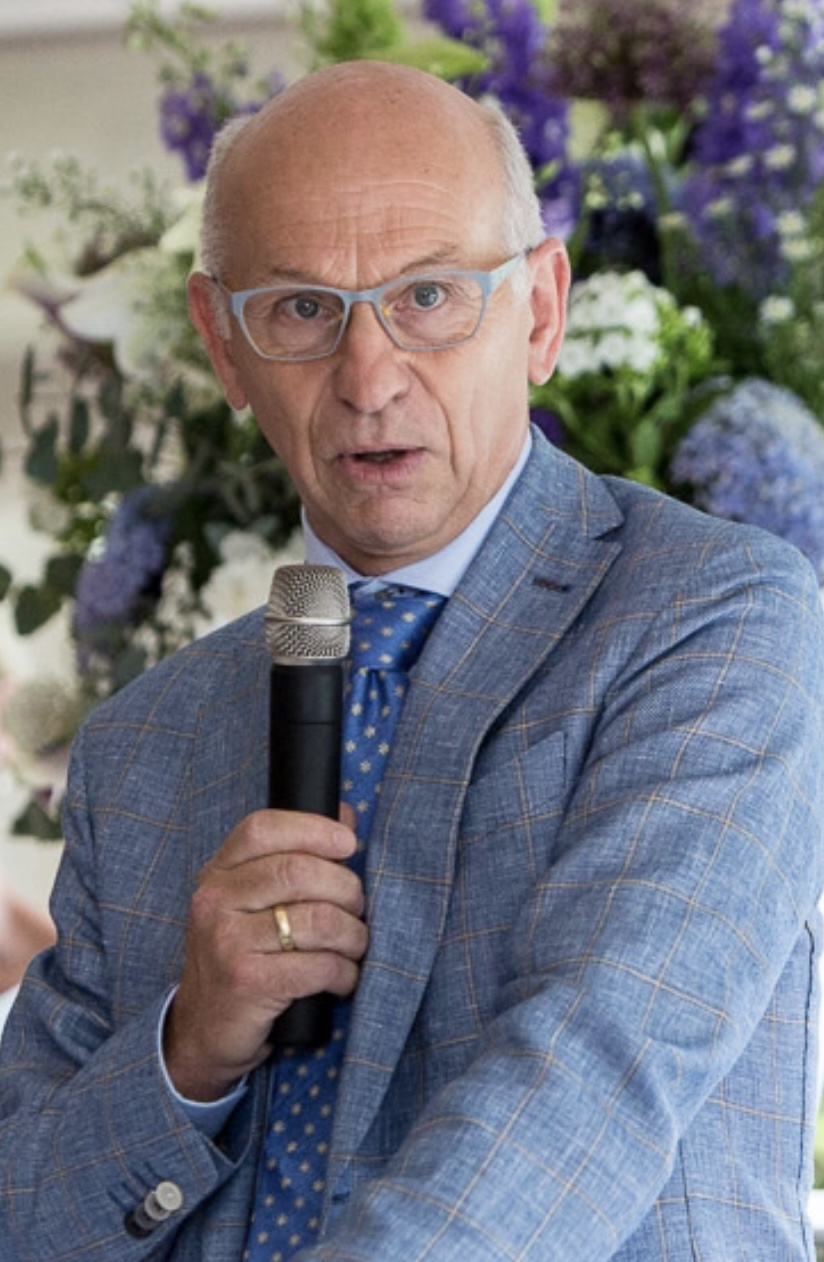
Frits Prinzen

Frits F.W. Prinzen (born July 2, 1954) is a Dutch expert on cardiac pacing therapies, both for bradycardia and for heart failure (cardiac resynchronisation therapy).

== Early life and education ==
He was born July 2, 1954, in Hilversum. He earned a master's degree in medical biology from Utrecht University in 1978, and a PhD in physiology from Maastricht University in 1982.

== Career ==
Prinzen works on cardiac pacing therapies, both for bradycardia and for heart failure (cardiac resynchronisation therapy, CRT). His main research topic is cardiac mechanics and long-term structural and functional adaptations to various conditions, with emphasis on asynchronous electrical activation and cardiac resynchronisation.

In 1995, he took a sabbatical year during which he worked at the Johns Hopkins University in Baltimore, Maryland, USA, where he researched MRI tagging of the heart. This work was published in the Journal of the American College of Cardiology.

=== Societal impact ===
His work has led to improved cardiological treatments, especially in the field of cardiac pacing. Together with cardiologists and industrial partners he improved and developed pacemakers, pacing wires, and implantation methods. In one case, a child with heart failure directly benefited from changing the site of the pacemaker wire. This theory was later confirmed in a large clinical trial, published in 2013. Prinzen demonstrated for the first time that pacing the left side of the interventricular septum maintained cardiac function. This pacing strategy has since been adopted in clinical practice.

Prinzen was awarded the Cardiovascaular Research Institute Maastricht's CARIM Commitment Award in 2016. In 2022 he received the Maastricht UMC+ medal of honour upon reaching his emeritus status after 44 years at Maastricht University.

== Published work ==
Frits Prinzen is co-author of over 280 scientific articles, with over 16,000 citations and an all time H-index of 70.

He has contributed to Clinical Cardiac Pacing, Defibrillation and Resynchronization Therapy.
