= Cardiac contractility modulation =

Therapy for treatment of heart failure patients

Cardiac Contractility Modulation
- Specialty: Heart failure, electrophysiology, cardiology

Cardiac contractility modulation is a therapy which is intended for the treatment of patients with moderate to severe heart failure (NYHA class II–IV) with symptoms despite optimal medical therapy who can benefit from an improvement in cardiac output. The short- and long-term use of this therapy enhances the strength of ventricular contraction and therefore the heart's pumping capacity by modulating (adjusting) the myocardial contractility. This is provided by a pacemaker-like device that applies non-excitatory electrical signals adjusted to and synchronized with the electrical action in the cardiac cycle.

In cardiac contractility modulation therapy, electrical stimulation is applied to the cardiac muscle during the absolute refractory period. In this phase of the cardiac cycle, electrical signals cannot trigger new cardiac muscle contractions, hence this type of stimulation is known as a non-excitatory stimulation. However, the electrical signals increase the influx of calcium ions into the cardiac muscle cells (cardiomyocytes). In contrast to other electrical stimulation treatments for heart failure, such as pacemaker therapy or implantable cardioverter defibrillators (ICD), cardiac contractility modulation does not directly affect cardiac rhythm. Rather, the aim is to enhance the heart's natural contraction (the native cardiac contractility) sustainably over long periods of time. Furthermore, unlike most interventions that increase cardiac contractility, cardiac contractility modulation is not associated with an unfavorable increase in oxygen demand by the heart (measured in terms of Myocardial Oxygen Consumption or MVO_{2}). This may be explained by the beneficial effect the therapy has in improving cardiac efficiency. A meta-analysis in 2014 and an overview of device-based treatment options in heart failure in 2013 concluded that cardiac contractility modulation treatment is safe, that it is generally beneficial to patients and that the treatment increases the exercise tolerance (ET) and quality of life (QoL) of patients. Furthermore, preliminary long-term survival data shows that cardiac contractility modulation is associated with lower long-term mortality in heart failure patients when compared with expected rates among similar patients not treated with cardiac contractility modulation.

== Medical uses ==
=== FDA approval ===
Based on the results of the pivotal FIX-HF-5C trial, the FDA approved cardiac contractility modulation therapy for use in the United States on March 21, 2019.

=== FDA indication ===
The FDA approved the OPTIMIZER Smart System, which delivers cardiac contractility modulation therapy, as indicated to improve 6-minute hall walk distance, quality of life, and functional status of NYHA Class III heart failure patients who remain symptomatic despite guideline directed medical therapy, who are in normal sinus rhythm, are not indicated for cardiac resynchronization therapy, and have a left ventricular ejection fraction ranging from 25% to 45%.

=== CE mark ===
Based on the results of clinical trials, cardiac contractility modulation devices are approved and available for clinical use in all European Union countries and in Australia, Turkey, India and Hong Kong, as well as in other countries that recognize CE marking for medical devices.

=== CE indication ===
Schematic representation of normal sinus rhythm as seen on an ECG. The QRS complex is shown in the center.

Based on the approval of cardiac contractility modulation devices, the therapy is a treatment option for patients that are at least 18 years old who suffer from heart failure symptoms due to left ventricular systolic dysfunction (LVSD) despite adequate medical treatment. Further clinical research are under way to identify which patient group within the scope of the device approval benefits most from cardiac contractility modulation treatment.

Criteria for the classification of patients with left ventricular systolic heart failure include the severity of the disease based on functional parameters (NYHA classification), the average percentage of blood volume ejected by the left ventricle with each heart beat (left ventricular ejection fraction or LVEF) and the duration of the QRS complex seen in the electrocardiogram (ECG). Most clinical studies on cardiac contractility modulation therapy have involved heart failure patients who were classified initially as NYHA Class II, III or IV and had a normal QRS duration (QRS duration ≤ 120 ms). The efficacy of cardiac contractility modulation on patients in an earlier stage of heart failure has not yet been studied.

A subsequent evaluation study (subgroup analysis) has already suggested a particular patient group that responds exceptionally well to cardiac contractility modulation therapy. The patients were characterized by a disease severity of NYHA class III and a left ventricular ejection fraction of ≥ 25%.

Although studies on cardiac contractility modulation therapy have focused on patients with a normal QRS duration (i.e. ≤ 120 ms), it is possible to use the therapy in patients who meet the treatment indication but who do not have a normal QRS duration.

A preliminary study has previously shown that cardiac contractility modulation may be safe and effective in such patients who have not responded to cardiac resynchronization therapy (CRT).

=== Therapeutic gap ===
Cardiac resynchronization therapy (CRT; also known as biventricular pacing) has proven to be an effective treatment in heart failure. However, CRT is generally recommended exclusively for patients with a preserved sinus rhythm and a prolonged QRS complex (≥ 120 ms) who also suffer from left bundle branch block (LBBB), or for patients without left bundle branch block but who have a preserved sinus rhythm and a QRS complex with a width of ≥ 150 ms. However, only 30-40% of all heart failure patients show such a prolonged QRS complex, and therefore the 60-70% of patients who have a normal QRS complex cannot be treated with CRT. In addition, around 30% of the patients eligible for CRT treatment do not respond to CRT.

Until recently, the only other available device-based treatment was the left ventricular assist device (LVAD). LVAD therapy is indicated in patients with severe illness and is associated with several hours of surgery (involving a cardiopulmonary bypass). It is usually considered as a therapy providing a "bridge to transplant" for heart failure patients classified as NYHA class IV, and is intended to support heart function until a heart transplant is received. Current research results suggest that the therapeutic gap described above could now be closed by the cardiac contractility modulation therapy. Additionally, a long-term study showed that the cardiac contractility modulation was able to stop the common and prognostically unfavorable long-term prolongation of QRS duration in heart failure patients. This result was interpreted as signaling the safety of the treatment and as an indicator that patients could benefit from cardiac contractility modulation therapy in the long term. If the QRS-stabilizing effect were to be confirmed in further studies, the cardiac contractility modulation would become the first device-based treatment for heart failure with the potential to halt QRS prolongation, a factor associated with a poor prognosis.

=== Recommendations ===
The guidelines issued by the European Society of Cardiology (ESC) in 2016, mention cardiac contractility modulation therapy as a therapy option to be considered in selected group of patients with HF. Mostly these guidelines are endorsed by national cardiac societies in individual countries within the European Union.

=== Efficacy ===
Cardiac contractility modulation has proven to be effective and safe in randomized controlled trials involving several hundred patients.

The nature and extent of the effect of cardiac contractility modulation have been the subject of numerous investigations. Although various individual publications, as well as one of two meta-analyses, have presented the efficacy and significant potential of cardiac contractility modulation in the treatment of heart failure, medical evaluation of the therapy efficacy is not yet complete. Scientists point out, however, that this was also the case for CRT therapy when it was first introduced, advocating the provision of cardiac contractility modulation to suitable patients before further studies are completed.

To date (February 2015), there are at least two meta-analyses studying the efficacy of cardiac contractility modulation therapy on heart failure, a large number of review articles (e.g.) and at least two survey articles on device-based treatments of advanced heart failure which address cardiac contractility modulation. Furthermore, there are more than 70 individual publications focusing specifically on cardiac contractility modulation therapy.

Further randomized controlled trials studying the effect of cardiac contractility modulation on the progression of heart failure have been initiated and are currently (as of February 2015) recruiting patients.

==== Meta-analyses ====
Giallauria et al. evaluated the three randomized controlled trials (RCTs) currently available on cardiac contractility modulation as a treatment for heart failure patients. The three trials included a total of 641 patients and assessed the effect of cardiac contractility modulation either in comparison to a sham treatment or in comparison to the best medical treatment. In contrast to an earlier meta-analysis by Kwong et al. the study did not evaluate the data based on summarized results alone, but on the basis of the individual data sets of the 641 enrolled patients.

The study concluded that cardiac contractility modulation significantly improved important markers of cardiac performance. These included the maximal oxygen uptake (peak VO2 or pVO2 – measured by ventilatory parameters during a cardiopulmonary exercise test), which is indicative of improved survival, and the 6-minute walk test. The quality of life of participating patients, measured by the Minnesota Living with Heart Failure Questionnaire (MLWHFQ), also improved significantly. However, both meta-analyses demanded additional and larger randomized controlled trials in order to evaluate the effect of the therapy more precisely.

Giallauria et al. describe the success of cardiac contractility modulation and the further potential of the therapy. Particular emphasis is given to the possibility that cardiac contractility modulation therapy may close the therapeutic gap in heart failure treatment if previous study outcomes are confirmed.

==== Long-Term Survival Studies ====
As of February 2015, the effect of cardiac contractility modulation therapy on the long-term mortality rates of heart failure patients has not been studied in a randomized controlled trial. Some preliminary single-center studies have been reported though. Kuschyk et al. evaluated the long-term efficacy and survival of patients with cardiac contractility modulation. Their analysis included 81 patients with a disease severity of NYHA class II, III or IV and a mean follow-up of around 3 years. The analysis compared the observed mortality rate with the prediction of the Meta-analysis Global Group in Chronic Heart Failure (MAGGIC) model which is based on the records of over 39,000 heart failure patients. Unlike a previous long-term outcome study of cardiac contractility modulation, this study was not limited by a widely heterogeneous group of patients.

Following long-term observation, the study concluded that cardiac contractility modulation improved quality of life, exercise tolerance, NYHA class, left ventricular ejection fraction (LVEF) and brain natriuretic peptide (BNP) levels. Mortality rates were significantly lower than predicted at year 1, and lower than predicted but not statistically significant at year 3.

==== General ====
Heart failure is a chronic disease that usually progresses gradually. The rate of progression and the degree of symptoms of the disease varies between different patients. Cardiac contractility modulation therapy aims to treat heart failure through a medium- to long-term treatment, over the course of weeks and months.

According to large implanting clinics, after the implantation wound is healed, the lifestyle of a patient is not restricted by the implanted device. Leisure, travel (by car, train, ship or plane), hobbies and sex life will not be restricted. The patient may perceive an improved capacity for these activities and overall enhanced performance and exercise capacity in response to the actual therapy.

== Contraindications ==
In the past, the most important contraindication in cardiac contractility modulation treatment was permanent and long-standing persistent atrial fibrillation. The signal application in current cardiac contractility modulation devices was timed and triggered according to the electrical activity of the atrium. In atrial fibrillation, electrical activity in the atrium is severely disturbed and is therefore not a reliable basis for the triggering of cardiac contractility modulation signals. This also applies to other diseases involving severe disturbance in electrical atrial sensing. Requests have been raised in scientific literature for an improved cardiac contractility modulation algorithm which would allow the therapy to be delivered independently from any atrial signal. A pioneering study had shown that an improved cardiac contractility modulation algorithm could make the therapy an effective treatment for patients with persistent atrial fibrillation. Following these study results the new generation was developed and can now offer cardiac contractility modulation therapy also for patients with atrial fibrillation.

Other irregular rhythms, including frequent premature ventricular contractions (ventricular extra systoles) or a distinct signal transduction disorder in the heart (untreated AV block of more than 300 ms), may represent contraindications. CRT treatment should be considered in lieu of cardiac contractility modulation in patients with left bundle branch block (LBBB) and a QRS duration of over 120 ms, or when the QRS duration is greater than 150 ms and independent of LBBB.

As with conventional pacemaker therapy, the cardiac contractility modulation device cannot be implanted if the leads cannot be positioned appropriately in the heart. In cases where there is an artificial heart valve between the right atrium and ventricle (a mechanical prosthetic tricuspid valve), the valve function could be greatly affected by the ventricular leads. In some instances it may be impossible to guide the leads through the main veins in the upper half of the body to the heart due to venous thrombosis, for example VVI pacemakers, in the case of 100% stimulation, are also contraindicated.

== Side effects ==
The most frequently encountered adverse events related to cardiac contractility modulation therapy are lead fracture or lead dislodgement. Other reported complications include:

- Infection and bleeding at the IPG implantation site
- Accumulation of fluid in the pericardium (pericardial effusion)

These side effects are similar to those that occur with other electrical stimulation therapies, such as pacemakers, CRT devices or ICD devices. Furthermore, recorded complications did not differ between patients with activated or deactivated cardiac contractility modulation devices.

Overall, cardiac contractility modulation treatment was demonstrated to have no negative impact on health markers.

=== Precautions ===
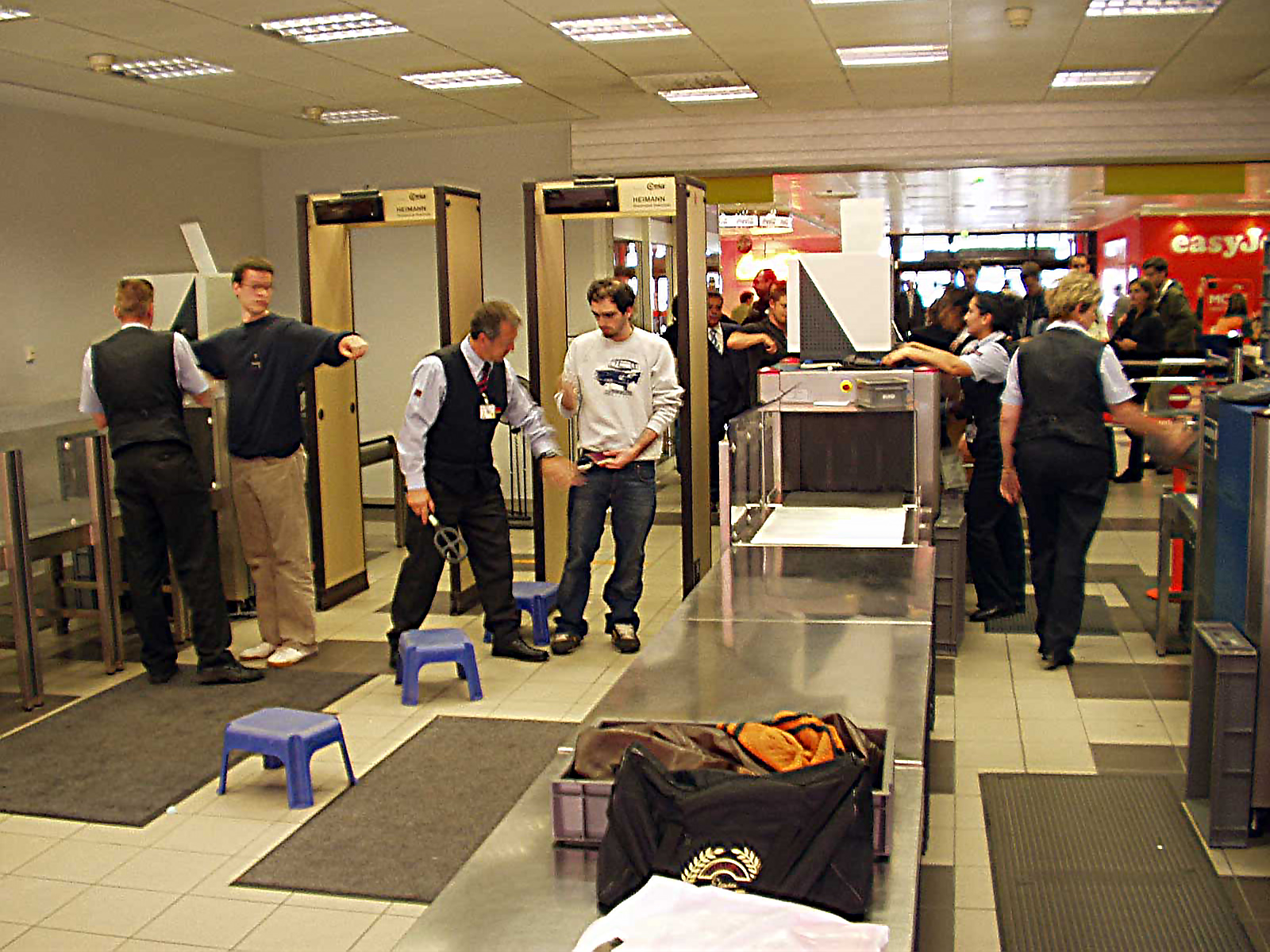
Metal detectors used for security screening

Similarly to patients with other electrical stimulation devices, patients with a cardiac contractility modulation device must follow certain precautions arising from the device implantation and its function.

- Electromagnetic fields: Strong electromagnetic fields can interfere with the function of the device. Most interference will lead to inhibition of cardiac contractility modulation signal delivery. Once away from the field, the device will resume its normal function in most cases. The electromagnetic fields of household appliances are usually considered harmless.
- Mobile phones: Similarly to other electrical stimulation devices, such as pacemakers, aside from a recommended safety distance of 10–15 cm (4-6 inches) between the device and mobile phones, there are no restrictions on the use of mobile phones.
- Security checks: Full body or hand-held metal detectors, such as those used at airport security controls, do not usually affect the function of the device. However, where such detectors are used there are often signs warning people with cardiac pacemakers and defibrillators, and cardiac contractility modulation patients are therefore advised to present their device ID. In these cases, the security check will typically continue with the use of a hand-held metal detector or by physical inspection.
- Sports: All sports associated with increased stress on the arms or the chest, such as body building, martial arts or tennis, are usually not permitted. Diving is only permitted up to a depth of 5 meters due to the high pressure at greater depth.
- Magnetic Resonance Imaging (MRI): Similarly to other electrical stimulation devices, such as pacemakers, cardiac contractility modulation therapy is a contraindication for MRI, a medical imaging technique.

== Mechanism of action ==
The mechanism of action of cardiac contractility modulation has been subject to continuous research since its initial discovery. Based on animal testing and experiments on human myocardial tissue obtained by biopsies, essential parts of the mechanism of action have been identified. According to current understanding (as of February 2015), the mechanism of action of cardiac contractility modulation may be summarized in the following manner: The signals applied during the electrical non-excitatory state of the cardiac muscle cells (the absolute refractory period) cause an increase in myocyte calcium in the cytosol during systole. This increases the muscle contraction strength. Additionally, within minutes, cell metabolism and gene expression, which are typically abnormal in heart failure, improve towards their normal state. This beneficial effect occurs initially only in the area adjacent to the electrodes, but with time also spreads to remote areas of the cardiac muscle. Cardiac contractility modulation therefore restores the structure and function of damaged cells back towards their normal state. In some cases, disease-related changes in the ventricular heart structure can be partially reversed by cardiac contractility modulation through a process known as reverse remodeling of the heart.

== History ==
Development of cardiac contractility modulation began in the late 1990s. Studies on individual cardiac muscle cells using a patch-clamp technique had already shown, in 1969, that a voltage applied during the absolute refractory period through leads between the interior of the cell and its outside environment increased the calcium influx through the cell membrane and improved the contraction of cardiac muscle cells. In 2001, scientists observed that a similar effect occurs even if the voltage is applied exclusively outside the cardiac muscle cells. Additionally, it was observed that therapeutically useful effects on the cardiac muscle were achieved if the electrical signals were applied not only to single cells but to large areas using larger leads, as used in conventional cardiac pacemakers. The contractility of both a healthy heart and a damaged heart could be increased through application of appropriate signals during the absolute refractory period of the cardiac muscle cells.

An implantable cardiac contractility modulation device was received by a patient for the first time in 2001. The first study on the therapeutic effects of in humans was presented in 2004. To date, more than 3,000 heart failure patients have been treated with cardiac contractility modulation worldwide, including 641 patients under the study conditions recommended by the Cochrane Collaboration as being necessary for inclusion in a meta-analysis. Cardiac contractility modulation device implantation was first successfully done in India in Royal Hospital, Trivandrum, Kerala, under the leadership of Dr. C. Bharath Chandran. Advocate Harishankar was the first person in India to get the cardiac contractility modulation device implanted.

== See also ==
- Heart
- Cardiac cycle
- Heart failure
- Artificial cardiac pacemaker
- Implantable cardioverter-defibrillator
- NYHA classification
- Cardiac resynchronization therapy
