= Center for Transportation Research UT Austin =

The Center for Transportation Research (CTR) is a research center affiliated with the Cockrell School of Engineering's Department of Civil, Architectural, and Environmental Engineering at The University of Texas at Austin in Austin, Texas. CTR is a research institution focused on transportation research and education.

== Summary ==
The Center for Transportation Research (CTR) conducts transportation research and provides educational opportunities for students of the University of Texas, including summer internships. The Center's primary research has been in such topics as concrete, materials research, pavement rehabilitation, bridge design, transportation planning and administration, modeling and forecasting, sustainable transportation, and technological innovations.

In any given year, CTR administers more than 100 research projects and interagency contracts with combined budgets exceeding $13 million. Approximately 45 faculty researchers and 10 professional researchers work at CTR. Approximately 60 graduate and undergraduate students (full-time equivalency) participate in the university's transportation program. Currently there are eight transportation research faculty. University of Texas students pursuing masters or doctoral degrees perform much of the hands-on research.

In addition to its own staff researchers, the center partners with other affiliated UT research centers, including Ferguson Structural Engineering Laboratory, the International Center for Aggregates Research, the Center for Electromechanics, the Construction Industry Institute, the Construction Materials Research Group, and the Center for Research in Water Resources. Researchers also participate in joint studies with Texas Transportation Institute and other universities.

Most of CTR's current research projects are sponsored by the Texas Department of Transportation (TxDOT) Research and Technology Implementation Office. Other sponsors of research include the U.S. Department of Transportation, the National Science Foundation (NSF), North Central Texas Council of Governments (NCTCOG), Capital Area Metropolitan Planning Organization (CAMPO), Capital Metropolitan Transportation Authority, and the City of Austin.

Each year, CTR holds an annual symposium where transportation professionals present research results and discuss ongoing projects.

== History ==
CTR was formed in 1979 by the merging of the Center for Highway Research (established in 1963 as an administrative unit of the College of Engineering) and the Council for Advanced Transportation Studies (established in 1972 as a multidisciplinary transportation research and educational organization).

Directors

- 1963-1979: Clyde Lee (established the Center for Highway Research)
- 1980-1999: B. Frank McCullough
- 1999-2012: Randy B. Machemehl, who also serves as Associate Director of the Southwest Region University Transportation Center headquartered at Texas A&M University
- 2012–2018: Chandra R. Bhat
- 2018-present: Amit Bhasin

== Programs ==
CTR programs include the Austin and Dallas InterAgency Contract (IAC) projects, the Network Modeling Center, the Intercity Passenger and High-Speed Rail project, Mega-Region Freight, the Laredo Border Master Plan, the Advanced Institute for Transportation Infrastructure Engineering and Management, the Cooperative Research Program, the Texas Pavement Preservation Center, the Southwest Region University Transportation Center, the Strategic Research Program, and the Superpave Asphalt Technology Program.

== Library ==
The CTR Library is a special library with a focus on transportation research. It primarily collects reports and products from government-funded transportation research as well as other materials that support research at the Texas Department of Transportation and at the Center for Transportation Research. The library's collection includes reports and other publications from TxDOT and research programs at other State departments of transportation, the Southwest Regional University Transportation Center (SWUTC), the Transportation Research Board, the Federal Highway Administration, and other agencies involved with research in transportation engineering. Its materials and services are also available to the general public.

The library operates as the TxDOT Research and Technology Implementation Office's library (TxDOT Research Library). It serves as an official repository for reports and other deliverables from the TxDOT cooperative research program (reports from all involved universities) and provides reference services, library material loans, and report distribution services to TxDOT staff.

The library is a member of the Western Transportation Knowledge Network (WTKN). The library is not a member of Online Computer Library Center (OCLC); its holdings are not listed in WorldCat.

As of January 2012, the library lists almost 22,000 items in its catalog.

== Awards ==
CTR researchers have received awards from various transportation groups including the Transportation Research Board (TRB), Women in Transportation Seminar (WTS), Eno Transportation Foundation’s Leadership Development Conference, National Highway Institute, Federal Highway Administration, the Texas chapter of Intelligent Transportation Society of America (ITS America), the Structural Engineers Association of Texas, and the American Society of Civil Engineers (ASCE).
