= Revivent =

Medical device used to treat Heart Failure

- Specialty: Cardiology

Revivent is a medical device used to treat heart failure due to damage to the heart muscle in the left ventricle in people who are too weak for open heart surgery. It addresses the ventricular remodeling that occurs in this condition.

The device is a set of three to five paired anchors that are used to pinch off, or "plicate", a part of the left ventricle where the heart muscle is damaged. One anchor in each pair is deployed using a catheter and pierces the wall between the ventricles from the inside of the right ventricle. The other is deployed using a long needle, and pierces the wall of the left ventricle from the outside. The two paired anchors are connected within the left ventricle, pulling the outside wall into contact with the inside wall.

The first in-human procedures of the device were performed in September 2013. BioVentrix, the company that brought it to market, obtained a CE mark for it in 2016.
