= University Transportation Centers Program =

The University Transportation Centers (UTC) program is a federal program to improve transportation research and education in the United States and to strengthen the country's competitiveness in the global transportation industry.

== History ==
The UTC program was established by the United States Department of Transportation in 1987 and was authorized by the United States Congress as part of the Surface Transportation and Uniform Relocation Assistance Act. The act specifically allocated funds for the establishment of federal transportation centers within institutions of higher education in each of the 10 Standard Federal Regions.

In 1991 the UTC program was reauthorized for six years and four new transportation centers were added. Six University Research Institutes (URIs), each with its own specifically mandated research objectives, were added as well. In 1998 the Transportation Equity Act for the 21st Century (TEA‑21) reauthorized the UTC program for an additional six years and increased the total number of UTCs from 14 to 33.

In 2005 the UTC program was again reauthorized in the Safe, Accountable, Flexible, Efficient Transportation Equity Act: A Legacy for Users (SAFETEA-LU). The number of UTCs increased to 60, some competitive and others explicitly named in the bill.

== Mission and goals ==
The UTC program mission is "to advance U.S. technology and expertise in the many disciplines comprising transportation through the mechanisms of education, research and technology transfer at university-based centers of excellence". The program also strives to achieve six specific goals:

1. Education: multi disciplinary program of course work and experiential learning that reinforces the transportation theme of the center
2. Human Resources: increased number of students, faculty, and staff who are attracted to and substantively involved in the undergraduate, graduate, and professional programs of the center
3. Diversity: students, faculty, and staff who reflect the growing diversity of the U.S. workforce and are substantively involved in the undergraduate, graduate, and professional programs of the center
4. Research Selection: objective process for selecting and reviewing research that balances multiple objectives of the UTC program
5. Research Performance: ongoing program of basic and applied research, the products of which are judged by peers or other experts in the field to advance the body of knowledge in transportation
6. Technology Transfer: availability of research results to potential users in a form that can be directly implemented, utilized, or otherwise applied
