= Heart failure =

Failure of the heart to provide sufficient blood flow throughout the body

- Other names: Congestive heart failure (CHF), congestive cardiac failure (CCF)
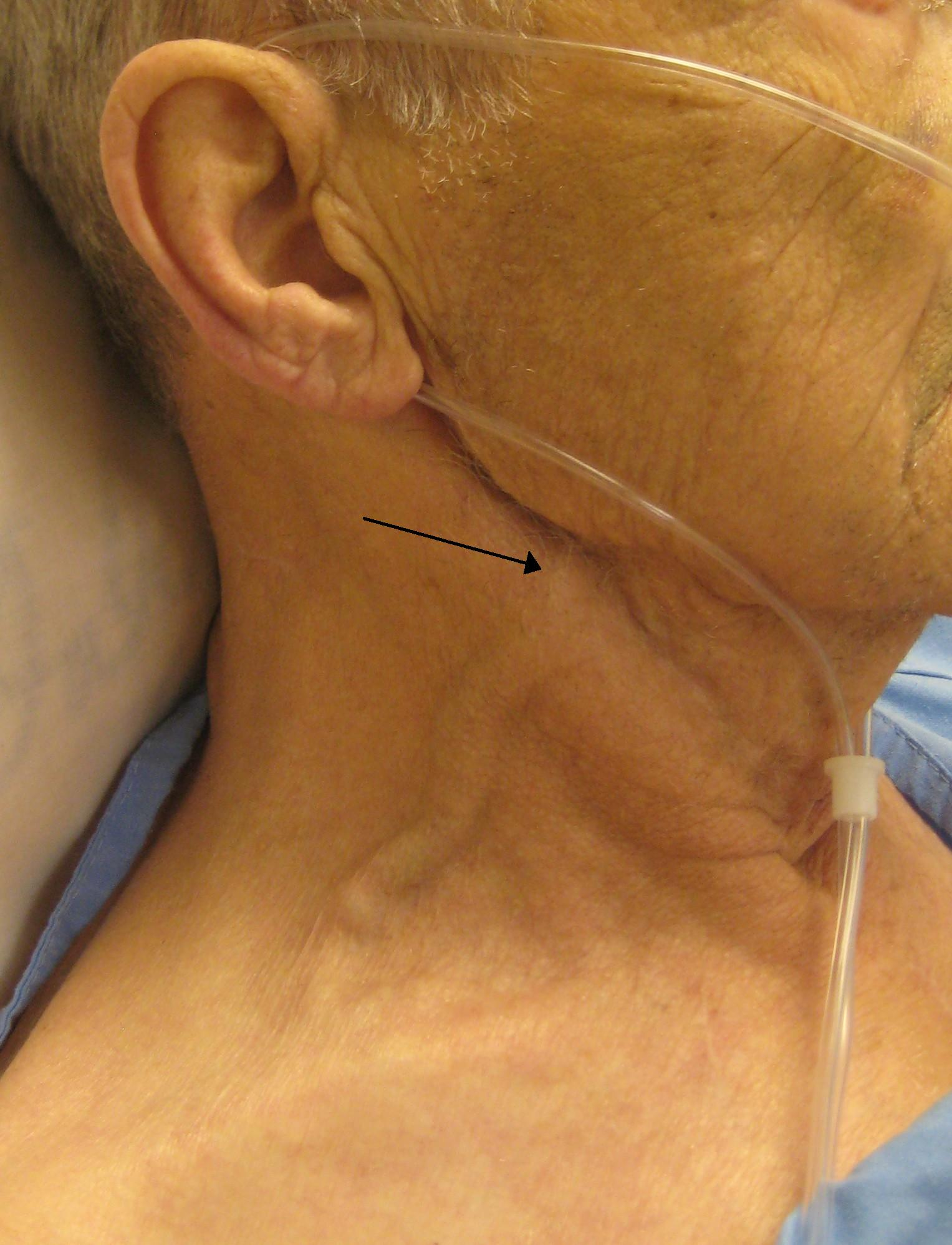
- A man with congestive heart failure and marked jugular venous distension. External jugular vein marked by an arrow.
- Specialty: Cardiology
- Symptoms: Shortness of breath, exhaustion, swollen legs
- Complications: Cardiac arrest
- Duration: Lifetime
- Causes: Heart attack, high blood pressure, abnormal heart rhythm, excessive alcohol use, infection, heart damage
- Risk factors: Smoking, sedentary lifestyle, obesity, exposure to second-hand smoke
- Diagnostic method: Echocardiogram
- Differential diagnosis: Kidney failure, thyroid disease, liver disease, anemia, obesity
- Medication: Diuretics, cardiac medications
- Frequency: 40 million (2015), 1–2% of adults (developed countries)
- Deaths: 35% risk of death in the first year

Heart failure (HF), also known as congestive heart failure (CHF), is a syndrome caused by an impairment in the heart's ability to fill with and pump blood.

Although symptoms vary based on which side of the heart is affected, HF typically presents with shortness of breath, excessive fatigue, and bilateral leg swelling. The severity of the heart failure is mainly decided based on ejection fraction and also measured by the severity of symptoms. Other conditions that have symptoms similar to heart failure include obesity, kidney failure, liver disease, anemia, and thyroid disease.

Common causes of heart failure include coronary artery disease, heart attack, high blood pressure, atrial fibrillation, valvular heart disease, excessive alcohol consumption, infection, and cardiomyopathy. These cause heart failure by altering the structure or the function of the heart or in some cases both. There are different types of heart failure: right-sided heart failure, which affects the right heart, left-sided heart failure, which affects the left heart, and biventricular heart failure, which affects both sides of the heart. Left-sided heart failure may be present with a reduced ejection fraction or with a preserved ejection fraction. Heart failure is not the same as cardiac arrest, in which blood flow stops completely due to the failure of the heart to pump.

Diagnosis is based on symptoms, physical findings, and echocardiography. Blood tests, and a chest X-ray may be useful to determine the underlying cause. Treatment depends on severity and case. For people with chronic, stable, or mild heart failure, treatment usually consists of lifestyle changes, such as not smoking, physical exercise, and dietary changes, as well as medications. In heart failure due to left ventricular dysfunction, angiotensin-converting-enzyme inhibitors, angiotensin II receptor blockers (ARBs), or angiotensin receptor-neprilysin inhibitors, along with beta blockers, mineralocorticoid receptor antagonists and SGLT2 inhibitors are recommended. Diuretics may also be prescribed to prevent fluid retention and the resulting shortness of breath. Depending on the case, an implanted device such as a pacemaker or implantable cardiac defibrillator may sometimes be recommended. In some moderate or more severe cases, cardiac resynchronization therapy (CRT) or cardiac contractility modulation may be beneficial. In severe disease that persists despite all other measures, a cardiac assist device ventricular assist device, or, occasionally, heart transplantation may be recommended.

Heart failure is a common, costly, and potentially fatal condition, and is the leading cause of hospitalization and readmission in older adults. Heart failure often leads to more drastic health impairments than the failure of other, similarly complex organs such as the kidneys or liver. In 2015, it affected about 40 million people worldwide. Overall, heart failure affects about 2% of adults, and more than 10% of those over the age of 70. Rates are predicted to increase.

The risk of death in the first year after diagnosis is about 35%, while the risk of death in the second year is less than 10% in those still alive. The risk of death is comparable to that of some cancers. In the United Kingdom, the disease is the reason for 5% of emergency hospital admissions. Heart failure has been known since ancient times in Egypt; it is mentioned in the Ebers Papyrus around 1550 BCE.

== Definition ==
The term "cardiovascular insufficiency" is sometimes used when the heart does not function effectively as a pump and fails to circulate enough blood through the circulatory system to meet the body's needs. This generally leads to the syndrome of heart failure, a combination of signs and symptoms when the heart functions poorly as a pump. This leads to high filling pressure in the left atrium with fluid accumulation and water retention. Most of the visible signs of heart failure are the result of this fluid accumulation (edema) and the adjective congestion is added to the definition of heart failure. Impaired ejection can lead to inadequate blood flow to the body tissues, resulting in ischemia.

== Signs and symptoms ==
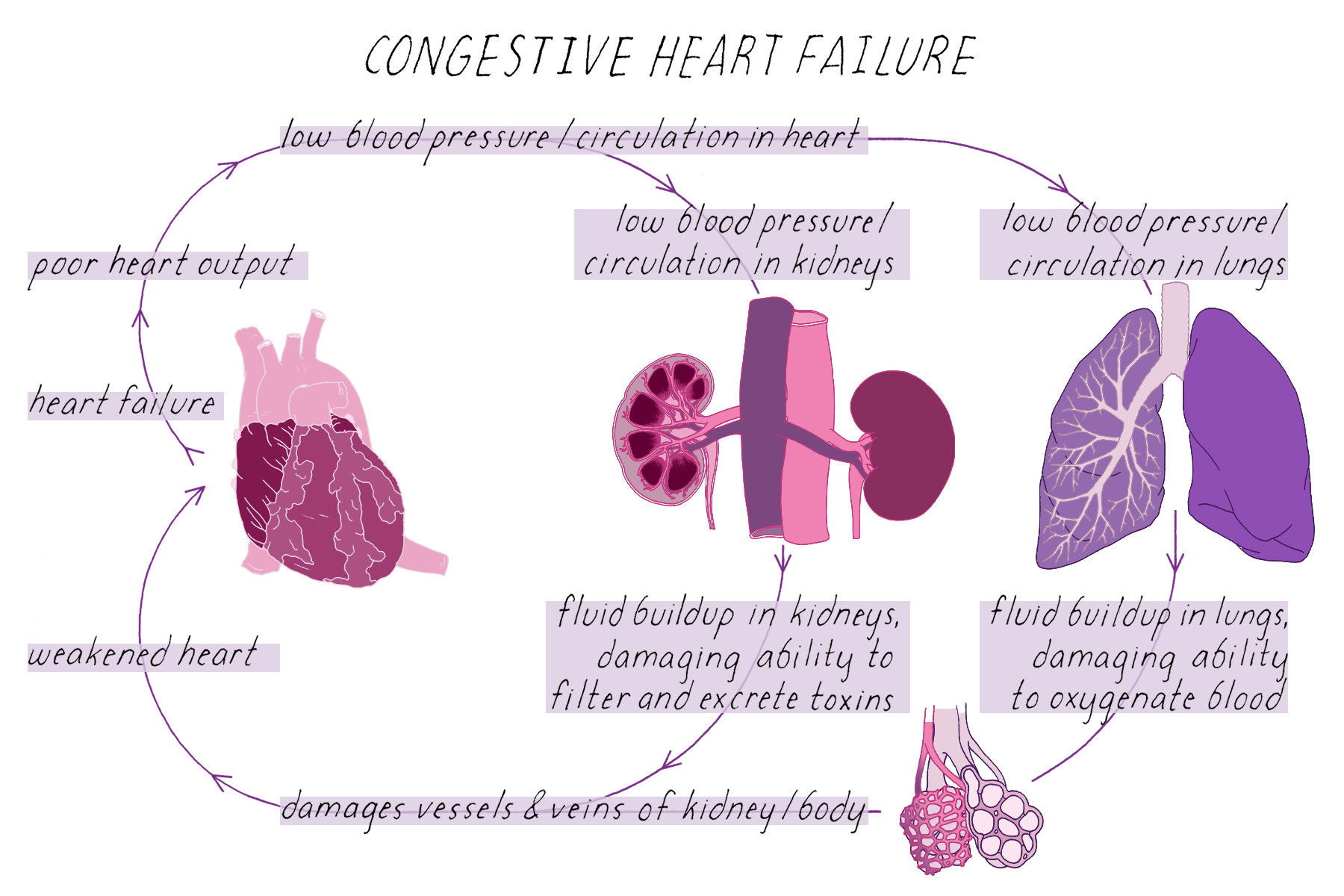
Congestive heart failure is a chronic progressive condition in which damage to the heart muscle affects the ability of the heart to pump blood throughout the body.

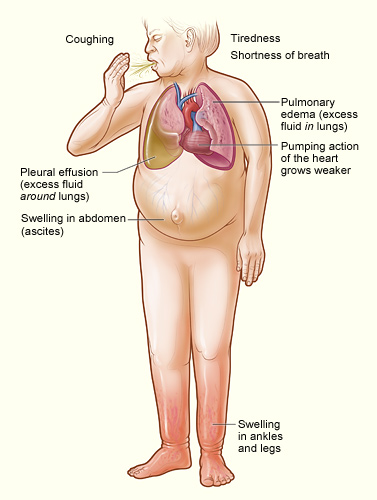
Signs and symptoms of severe heart failure

Congestive heart failure is a pathophysiological condition in which the heart's output is insufficient to meet the needs of the body and lungs. The term "congestive heart failure" is often used because one of the most common symptoms is congestion or fluid accumulation in the tissues and veins of the lungs or other parts of a person's body.

Congestion manifests itself particularly in the form of fluid accumulation and swelling (edema), in the form of peripheral edema (causing swollen limbs and feet) and pulmonary edema (causing difficulty breathing) and ascites (swollen abdomen). Pulse pressure, which is the difference between the systolic ("top number") and diastolic ("bottom number") blood pressures, is often low/narrow (i.e. 25% or less of the level of the systolic) in people with heart failure, and this can be an early warning sign.

Symptoms of heart failure are traditionally divided into left-sided and right-sided because the left and right ventricles supply different parts of the circulation. In biventricular heart failure, both sides of the heart are affected. Left-sided heart failure is the more common.

=== Left-sided failure ===
The left side of the heart takes oxygen-rich blood from the lungs and pumps it to the rest of the circulatory system in the body (except for the pulmonary circulation). Failure of the left side of the heart causes blood to back up into the lungs, causing breathing difficulties and fatigue due to an insufficient supply of oxygenated blood. Common respiratory signs include increased respiratory rate and labored breathing (nonspecific signs of shortness of breath). Rales or crackles are heard initially in the lung bases and when severe in all lung fields indicate the development of pulmonary edema (fluid in the alveoli). Cyanosis, indicates deficiency of oxygen in the blood, is a late sign of extremely severe pulmonary edema.

Other signs of left ventricular failure include a laterally displaced apex beat (which occurs when the heart is enlarged) and a gallop rhythm (additional heart sounds), which may be heard as a sign of increased blood flow or increased intracardiac pressure. Heart murmurs may indicate the presence of valvular heart disease, either as a cause (e.g., aortic stenosis) or as a consequence (e.g., mitral regurgitation) of heart failure.

Reverse insufficiency of the left ventricle causes congestion in the blood vessels of the lungs so that symptoms are predominantly respiratory. Reverse insufficiency can be divided into the failure of the left atrium, the left ventricle, or both within the left circuit. Patients will experience shortness of breath (dyspnea) on exertion and, in severe cases, dyspnea at rest. Increasing breathlessness while lying down, called orthopnea, also occurs. It can be measured by the number of pillows required to lie comfortably, with extreme cases of orthopnea forcing the patient to sleep sitting up. Another symptom of heart failure is paroxysmal nocturnal dyspnea: a sudden nocturnal attack of severe shortness of breath, usually occurring several hours after falling asleep. There may be "cardiac asthma" or wheezing. Impaired left ventricular forward function can lead to symptoms of poor systemic perfusion such as dizziness, confusion, and cool extremities at rest. Loss of consciousness may also occur due to loss of blood supply to the brain.

=== Right-sided failure ===
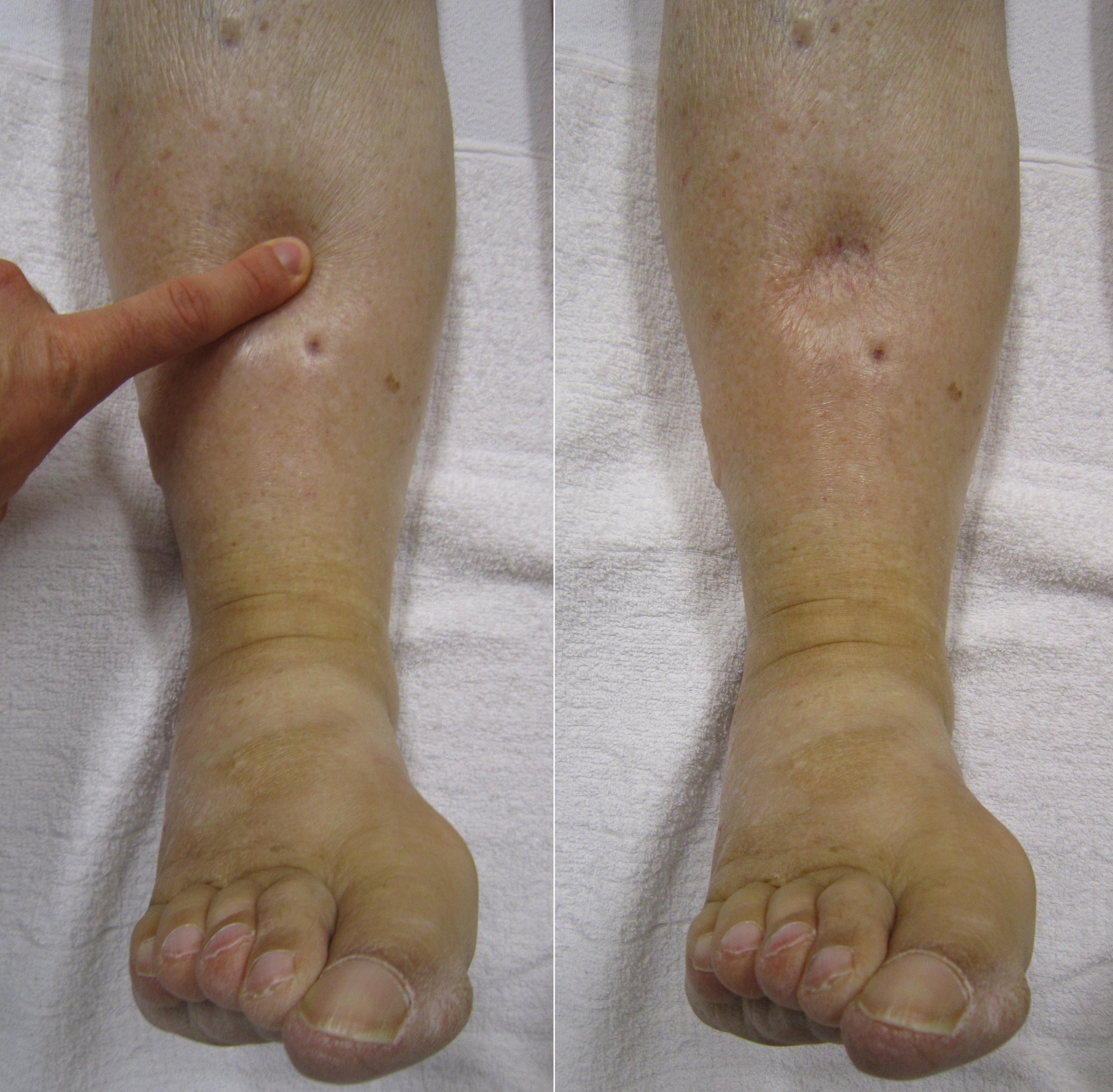
Severe peripheral pitting edema

Right-sided heart failure is often caused by pulmonary heart disease (cor pulmonale), which is typically caused by issues with pulmonary circulation such as pulmonary hypertension or pulmonic stenosis. Physical examination may reveal pitting peripheral edema, ascites, liver enlargement, and spleen enlargement. Jugular venous pressure is frequently assessed as a marker of fluid status, which can be accentuated by testing hepatojugular reflux. If the right ventricular pressure is increased, a parasternal heave which causes the compensatory increase in contraction strength may be present.

Backward failure of the right ventricle leads to congestion of systemic capillaries. This generates excess fluid accumulation in the body. This causes swelling under the skin (peripheral edema or anasarca) and usually affects the dependent parts of the body first, causing foot and ankle swelling in people who are standing up and sacral edema in people who are predominantly lying down. Nocturia (frequent night-time urination) may occur when fluid from the legs is returned to the bloodstream while lying down at night. In progressively severe cases, ascites (fluid accumulation in the abdominal cavity causing swelling) and liver enlargement may develop. Significant liver congestion may result in impaired liver function (congestive hepatopathy), jaundice, and coagulopathy (problems of decreased or increased blood clotting).

=== Biventricular failure ===
Dullness of the lung fields when percussed and reduced breath sounds at the base of the lungs may suggest the development of a pleural effusion (fluid collection between the lung and the chest wall). Though it can occur in isolated left- or right-sided heart failure, it is more common in biventricular failure because pleural veins drain into both the systemic and pulmonary venous systems. When unilateral, effusions are often right-sided.

If a person with a failure of one ventricle lives long enough, it will tend to progress to failure of both ventricles. For example, left ventricular failure allows pulmonary edema and pulmonary hypertension to occur, which increases stress on the right ventricle. Though still harmful, right ventricular failure is not as deleterious to the left side.

== Causes ==
Since heart failure is a syndrome and not a disease, establishing the underlying cause is vital to diagnosis and treatment. In heart failure, the structure or the function of the heart or in some cases both are altered. Heart failure is the potential end stage of all heart diseases.

Common causes of heart failure include coronary artery disease – including a previous myocardial infarction (heart attack), high blood pressure, atrial fibrillation, and valvular heart disease – excessive alcohol use, infection, and cardiomyopathy of an unknown cause. In addition, viral infection and subsequent myocarditis – inflammation of the heart's myocardial tissue – can similarly contribute to the development of heart failure. Genetic predisposition plays an important role. If more than one cause is present, progression is more likely and prognosis is worse.

Heart damage can predispose a person to develop heart failure later in life and has many causes including systemic viral infections (e.g., HIV), chemotherapeutic agents such as daunorubicin, cyclophosphamide, trastuzumab and substance use disorders of substances such as alcohol, cocaine, and methamphetamine. An uncommon cause is exposure to certain toxins such as lead and cobalt. Additionally, infiltrative disorders such as amyloidosis and connective tissue diseases such as systemic lupus erythematosus have similar consequences. Obstructive sleep apnea (a condition of sleep wherein disordered breathing overlaps with obesity, hypertension, and/or diabetes) is regarded as an independent cause of heart failure. Recent reports from clinical trials have also linked variation in blood pressure to heart failure and cardiac changes that may give rise to heart failure.

=== High-output heart failure ===
High-output heart failure happens when the amount of blood pumped out is more than typical and the heart cannot keep up. This can occur in overload situations such as blood or serum infusions, kidney diseases, chronic severe anemia, beriberi (vitamin B_{1}/thiamine deficiency), hyperthyroidism, cirrhosis, Paget's disease, multiple myeloma, arteriovenous fistulae, or arteriovenous malformations.

=== Acute decompensation ===
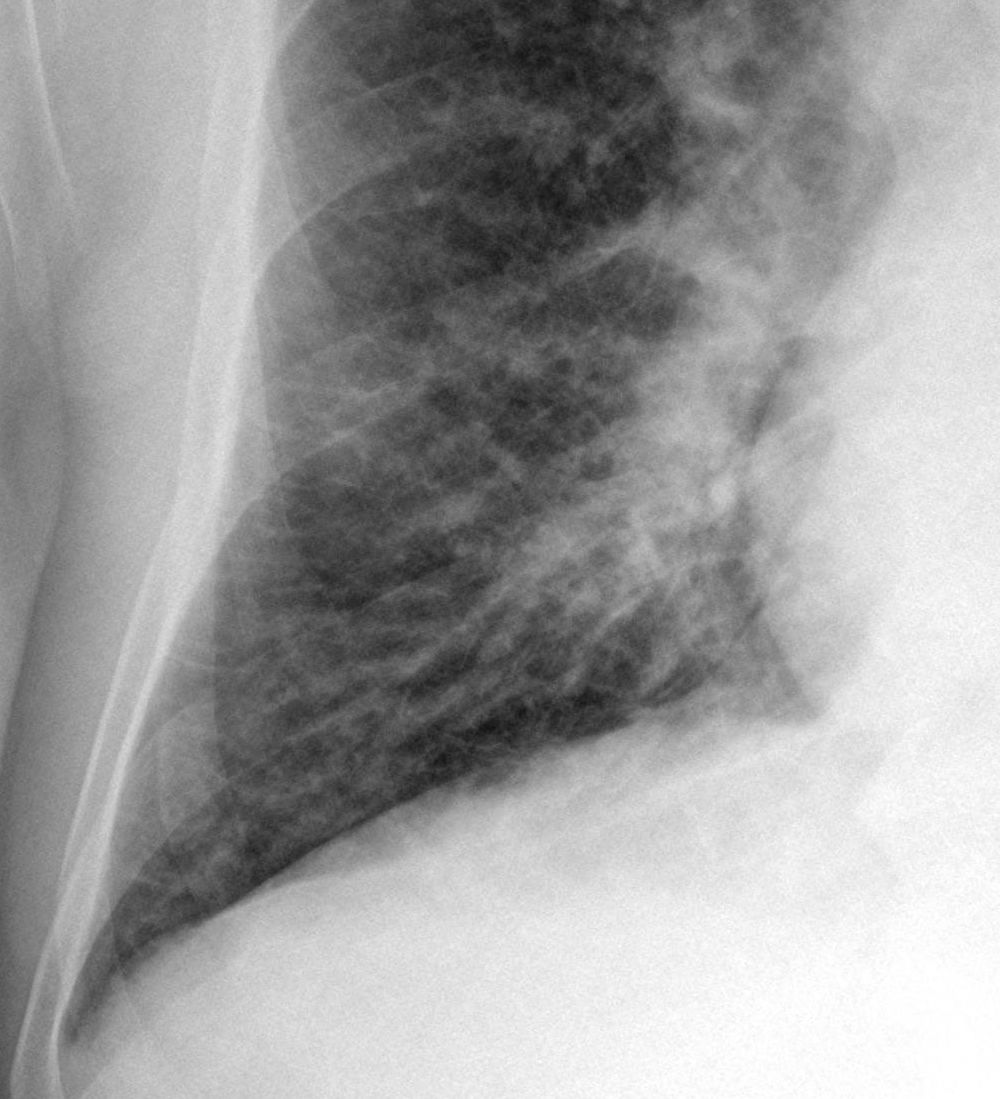
Kerley B lines in radiograph of acute cardiac decompensation. The short, horizontal lines can be found everywhere in the right lung.

Chronic stable heart failure may easily decompensate (fail to meet the body's metabolic needs). This most commonly results from a concurrent illness (such as myocardial infarction (a heart attack) or pneumonia), abnormal heart rhythms, uncontrolled hypertension, or a person's failure to maintain a fluid restriction, diet, or medication.

Other factors that may worsen CHF include: anemia, hyperthyroidism, excessive fluid or salt intake, and medication such as NSAIDs and thiazolidinediones. NSAIDs increase the risk twofold.

=== Medications ===
A number of medications may cause or worsen the disease. This includes NSAIDs, COX-2 inhibitors, a number of anesthetic agents such as ketamine, thiazolidinediones, some cancer medications, several antiarrhythmic medications, pregabalin, alpha-2 adrenergic receptor agonists, minoxidil, itraconazole, cilostazol, anagrelide, stimulants (e.g., methylphenidate), tricyclic antidepressants, lithium, antipsychotics, dopamine agonists, TNF inhibitors, calcium channel blockers (especially verapamil and diltiazem), salbutamol, and tamsulosin.

By inhibiting the formation of prostaglandins, NSAIDs may exacerbate heart failure through several mechanisms, including promotion of fluid retention, increasing blood pressure, and decreasing a person's response to diuretic medications. Similarly, the ACC/AHA recommends against using COX-2 inhibitor medications in people with heart failure. Thiazolidinediones have been strongly linked to new cases of heart failure and worsening of pre-existing congestive heart failure due to their association with weight gain and fluid retention. Certain calcium channel blockers, such as diltiazem and verapamil, are known to decrease the force with which the heart ejects blood; thus, these are not recommended in people with heart failure with a reduced ejection fraction.

Breast cancer patients are at high risk of heart failure due to several factors. After analyzing data from 26 studies (836,301 patients), the recent meta-analysis found that breast cancer survivors demonstrated a higher risk of heart failure within the first ten years after diagnosis (hazard ratio = 1.21; 95% CI: 1.1, 1.33). The pooled incidence of heart failure in breast cancer survivors was 4.44 (95% CI 3.33-5.92) per 1000 person-years of follow-up.

=== Supplements ===
Certain alternative medicines carry a risk of exacerbating existing heart failure, and are not recommended. This includes aconite, ginseng, gossypol, gynura, licorice, lily of the valley, tetrandrine, and yohimbine. Aconite can cause abnormally slow heart rates and abnormal heart rhythms such as ventricular tachycardia. Ginseng can cause abnormally low or high blood pressure and may interfere with the effects of diuretic medications. Gossypol can increase the effects of diuretics, leading to toxicity.

Gynura can cause low blood pressure. Licorice can worsen heart failure by increasing blood pressure and promoting fluid retention. Lily of the Valley can cause abnormally slow heart rates with mechanisms similar to those of digoxin. Tetrandrine can lower blood pressure by inhibiting L-type calcium channels. Yohimbine can exacerbate heart failure by increasing blood pressure through alpha-2 adrenergic receptor antagonism.

== Pathophysiology ==
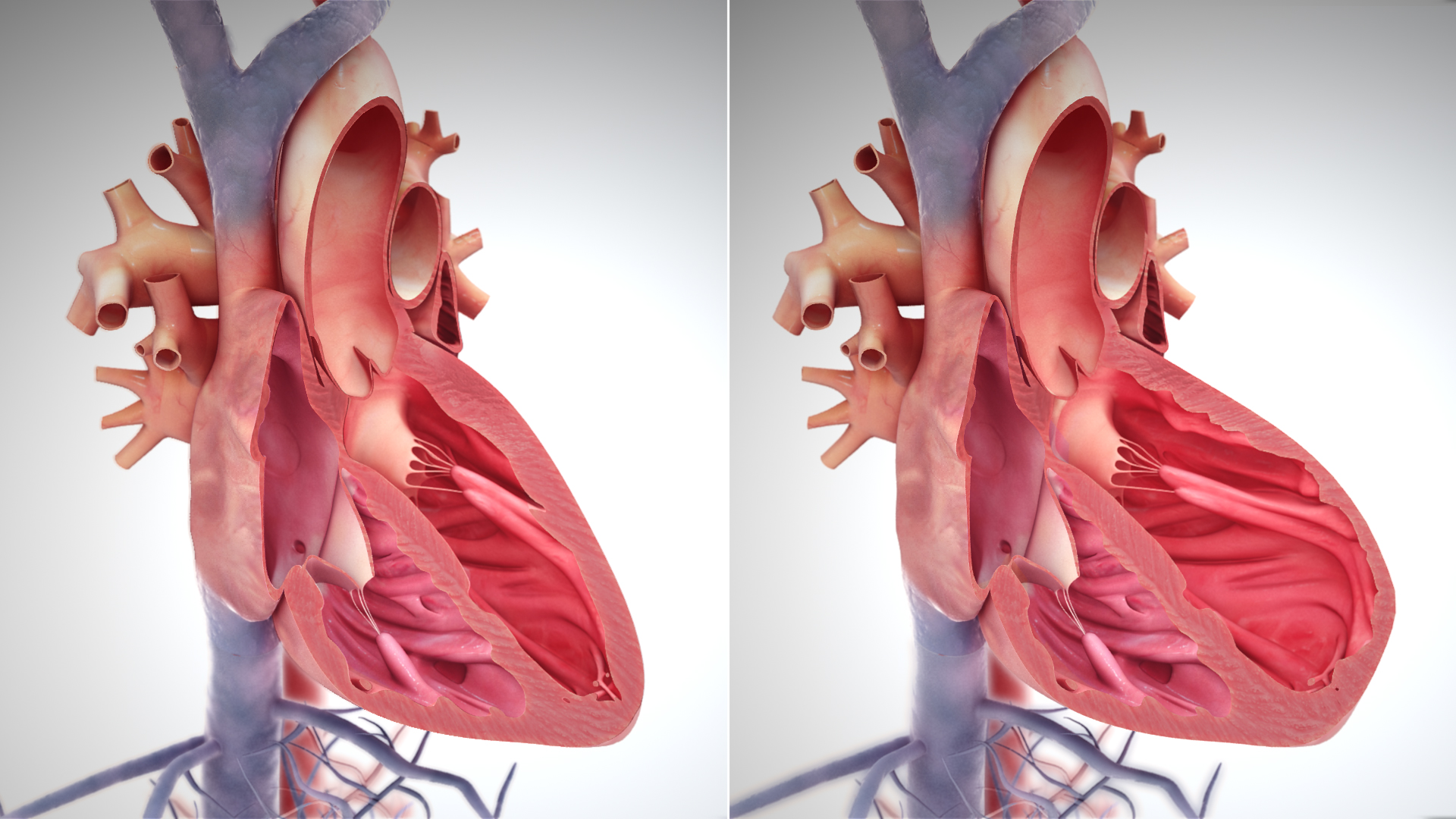
Model of a normal heart (left); and a weakened heart, with over-stretched muscle and dilation of left ventricle (right); both during diastole

Heart failure is caused by any condition that reduces the efficiency of the heart muscle, through damage or overloading. Over time, these increases in workload, which are mediated by long-term activation of neurohormonal systems such as the renin–angiotensin system and the sympathoadrenal system, lead to fibrosis, dilation, and structural changes in the shape of the left ventricle from elliptical to spherical.

The heart of a person with heart failure may have a reduced force of contraction due to overloading of the ventricle. In a normal heart, increased filling of the ventricle results in increased contraction force by the Frank–Starling law of the heart, and thus a rise in cardiac output. In heart failure, this mechanism fails, as the ventricle is loaded with blood to the point where heart muscle contraction becomes less efficient. This is due to the reduced ability to cross-link actin and myosin myofilaments in over-stretched heart muscle.

== Diagnosis ==
No diagnostic criteria have been agreed on as the gold standard for heart failure, especially heart failure with preserved ejection fraction (HFpEF).

In the UK, the National Institute for Health and Care Excellence recommends measuring N-terminal pro-BNP (NT-proBNP) followed by an ultrasound of the heart if positive. In Europe, the European Society of Cardiology, and in the United States, the AHA/ACC/HFSA, recommend measuring NT-proBNP or BNP followed by an ultrasound of the heart if positive. This is recommended in those with symptoms consistent with heart failure such as shortness of breath.

The European Society of Cardiology defines the diagnosis of heart failure as symptoms and signs consistent with heart failure in combination with "objective evidence of cardiac structural or functional abnormalities". This definition is consistent with an international 2021 report termed "Universal Definition of Heart Failure". Score-based algorithms have been developed to help in the diagnosis of HFpEF, which can be challenging for physicians to diagnose. The AHA/ACC/HFSA defines heart failure as symptoms and signs consistent with heart failure in combination with shown "structural and functional alterations of the heart as the underlying cause for the clinical presentation", for HFmrEF and HFpEF specifically requiring "evidence of spontaneous or provokable increased left ventricle filling pressures".

=== Algorithms ===
The European Society of Cardiology has developed a diagnostic algorithm for HFpEF, named HFA-PEFF. HFA-PEFF considers symptoms and signs, typical clinical demographics (obesity, hypertension, diabetes, elderly, atrial fibrillation), and diagnostic laboratory tests, ECG, and echocardiography.

=== Classification ===
==== "Left", "right" and mixed heart failure ====
One historical method of categorizing heart failure is by the side of the heart involved (left heart failure versus right heart failure). Right heart failure was thought to compromise blood flow to the lungs compared to left heart failure compromising blood flow to the aorta and consequently to the brain and the remainder of the body's systemic circulation. However, mixed presentations are common, and left heart failure is a common cause of right heart failure.

==== By ejection fraction ====
A more accurate classification of heart failure type is made by measuring ejection fraction, or the proportion of blood pumped out of the heart during a single contraction. Ejection fraction is given as a percentage, with the normal range being between 50% and 75%. The types are:

1. Heart failure with reduced ejection fraction (HFrEF): Synonyms no longer recommended are "heart failure due to left ventricular systolic dysfunction" and "systolic heart failure". HFrEF is associated with an ejection fraction less than 40%.
2. Heart failure with mildly reduced ejection fraction (HFmrEF), previously called "heart failure with mid-range ejection fraction", is defined by an ejection fraction of 41–49%.
3. Heart failure with preserved ejection fraction (HFpEF): Synonyms no longer recommended include "diastolic heart failure" and "heart failure with normal ejection fraction". HFpEF occurs when the left ventricle contracts normally during systole, but the ventricle is stiff and does not relax normally during diastole, which impairs filling.
4. Heart failure with recovered ejection fraction (HFrecovEF or HFrecEF): patients previously with HFrEF with complete normalization of left ventricular ejection (≥50%).

Heart failure may also be classified as acute or chronic. Chronic heart failure is a long-term condition, usually kept stable by the treatment of symptoms. Acute decompensated heart failure is a worsening of chronic heart failure symptoms, which can result in acute respiratory distress. High-output heart failure can occur when there is increased cardiac demand that results in increased left ventricular diastolic pressure which can develop into pulmonary congestion (pulmonary edema).

Several terms are closely related to heart failure and may be the cause of heart failure, but should not be confused with it. Cardiac arrest and asystole refer to situations in which no cardiac output occurs at all. Without urgent treatment, these events result in sudden death. Myocardial infarction (heart attack) refers to heart muscle damage due to insufficient blood supply, usually as a result of a blocked coronary artery. Cardiomyopathy refers specifically to problems within the heart muscle, and these problems can result in heart failure. Ischemic cardiomyopathy implies that the cause of muscle damage is coronary artery disease. Dilated cardiomyopathy implies that the muscle damage has resulted in enlargement of the heart. Hypertrophic cardiomyopathy involves enlargement and thickening of the heart muscle.

=== Ultrasound ===
An echocardiogram (ultrasound of the heart) is commonly used to support a clinical diagnosis of heart failure. This can determine the stroke volume (SV, the amount of blood in the heart that exits the ventricles with each beat), the end-diastolic volume (EDV, the total amount of blood at the end of diastole), and the SV in proportion to the EDV, a value known as the ejection fraction (EF). In pediatrics, the shortening fraction is the preferred measure of systolic function. Normally, the EF should be between 50 and 70%; in systolic heart failure, it drops below 40%. Echocardiography can also identify valvular heart disease and assess the state of the pericardium (the connective tissue sac surrounding the heart). Echocardiography may also aid in deciding specific treatments, such as medication, insertion of an implantable cardioverter-defibrillator, or cardiac resynchronization therapy. Echocardiography can also help determine if acute myocardial ischemia is the precipitating cause, and may manifest as regional wall motion abnormalities on echo.

A carotid ultrasound was found to assist with determining whether males aged over 60 were at risk of developing heart failure in the future. The ultrasound scans the carotid arteries which carry blood to the brain, with men that have less flexible arteries being at greater risk.

Ultrasound showing severe systolic heart failure

Ultrasound showing severe systolic heart failure

Ultrasound of the lungs showing edema due to severe systolic heart failure

Ultrasound showing severe systolic heart failure

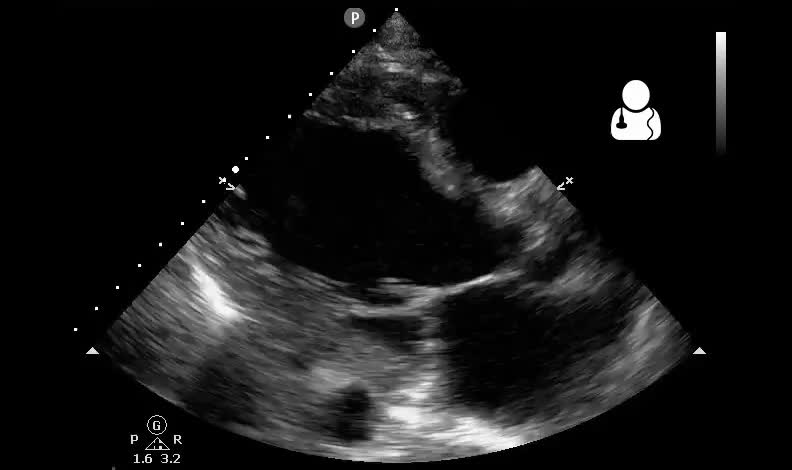
Ultrasound showing severe systolic heart failure

=== Chest X-ray ===
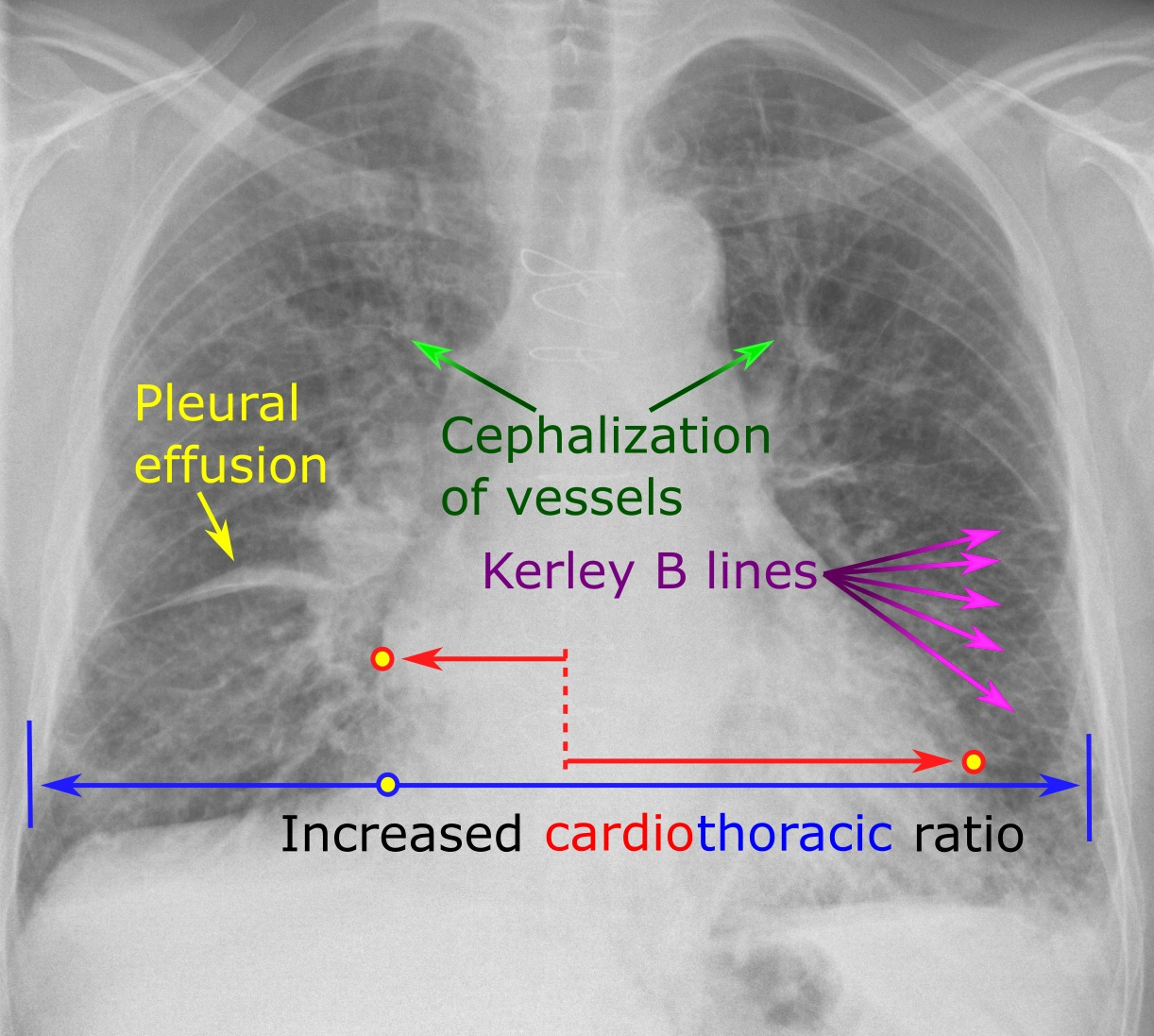
Chest radiograph of a lung with distinct Kerley B lines, as well as an enlarged heart (as shown by an increased cardiothoracic ratio, cephalization of pulmonary veins, and minor pleural effusion as seen for example in the right horizontal fissure. Yet, no obvious lung edema is seen. Overall, this indicates intermediate severity (stage II) heart failure.

Chest X-rays are frequently used to aid in the diagnosis of CHF. In a person who is compensated, this may show cardiomegaly (visible enlargement of the heart), quantified as the cardiothoracic ratio (proportion of the heart size to the chest). In left ventricular failure, evidence may exist of vascular redistribution (upper lobe blood diversion or cephalization), Kerley lines, cuffing of the areas around the bronchi, and interstitial edema. Ultrasound of the lung may also detect Kerley lines.

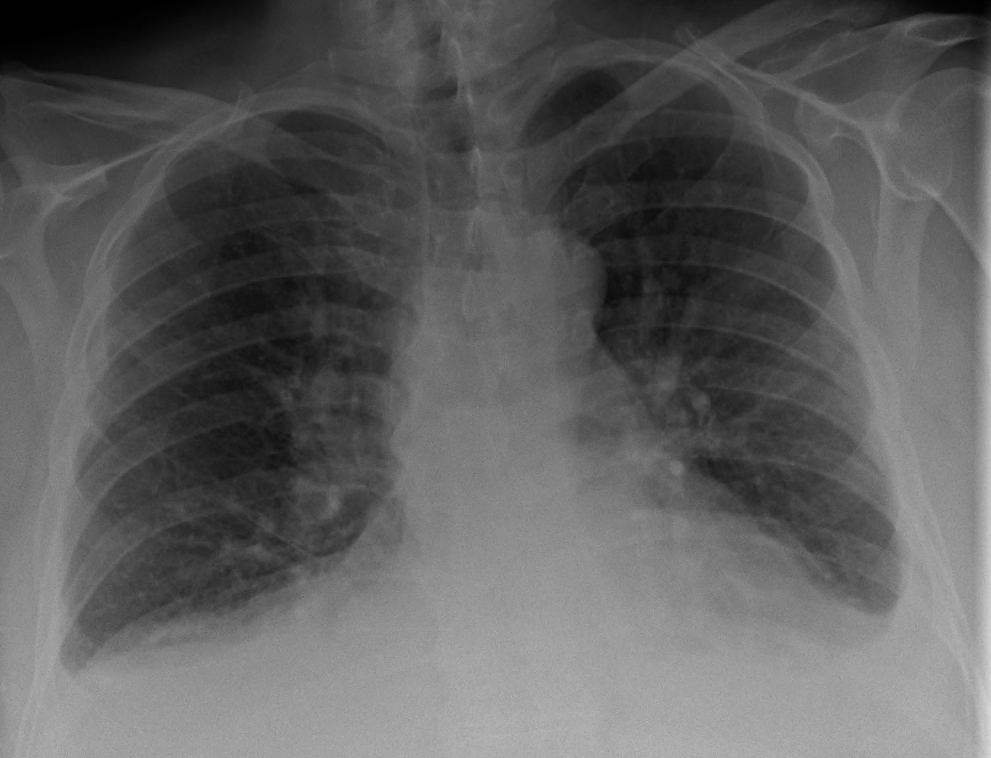
Congestive heart failure with small bilateral effusions

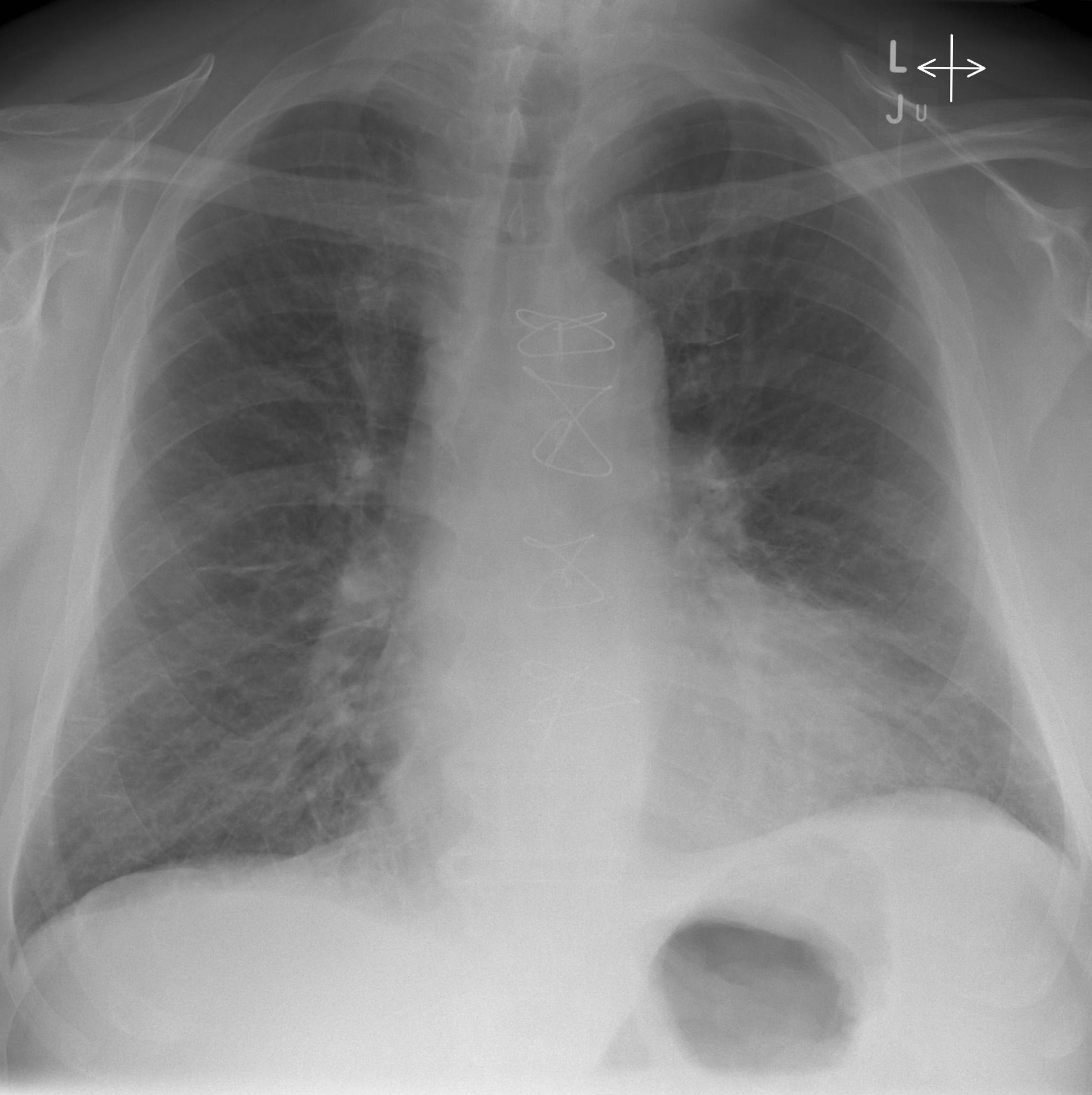
Kerley B lines

=== Electrophysiology ===
An electrocardiogram (ECG or EKG) may be used to identify arrhythmias, ischemic heart disease, right and left ventricular hypertrophy, and presence of conduction delay or abnormalities (e.g. left bundle branch block). Although these findings are not specific to the diagnosis of heart failure, a normal ECG virtually excludes left ventricular systolic dysfunction.

=== Blood tests ===
N-terminal pro-BNP (NT-proBNP) is the favored biomarker for the diagnosis of heart failure, according to guidelines published 2018 by NICE in the UK. Brain natriuretic peptide 32 (BNP) is another biomarker commonly tested for heart failure. An elevated NT-proBNP or BNP is a specific test indicative of heart failure. Additionally, NT-proBNP or BNP can be used to differentiate between causes of dyspnea due to heart failure from other causes of dyspnea. If a myocardial infarction is suspected, various cardiac markers may be used.

Blood tests routinely performed include electrolytes (sodium, potassium), measures of kidney function, liver function tests, thyroid function tests, a complete blood count, and often C-reactive protein if infection is suspected.

Hyponatremia (low serum sodium concentration) is common in heart failure. Vasopressin levels are usually increased, along with renin, angiotensin II, and catecholamines to compensate for reduced circulating volume due to inadequate cardiac output. This leads to increased fluid and sodium retention in the body; the rate of fluid retention is higher than the rate of sodium retention in the body, this phenomenon causes hypervolemic hyponatremia (low sodium concentration due to high body fluid retention). This phenomenon is more common in older women with low body mass. Severe hyponatremia can result in accumulation of fluid in the brain, causing cerebral edema and intracranial hemorrhage.

=== Angiography ===
Angiography is the X-ray imaging of blood vessels, which is done by injecting contrast agents into the bloodstream through a thin plastic tube (catheter), which is placed directly in the blood vessel. X-ray images are called angiograms. Heart failure may be the result of coronary artery disease, and its prognosis depends in part on the ability of the coronary arteries to supply blood to the myocardium (heart muscle). As a result, coronary catheterization may be used to identify possibilities for revascularisation through percutaneous coronary intervention or bypass surgery.

=== Staging ===
Heart failure is commonly stratified by the degree of functional impairment conferred by the severity of the heart failure, as reflected in the New York Heart Association (NYHA) functional classification. The NYHA functional classes (I–IV) begin with class I, which is defined as a person who experiences no limitation in any activities and has no symptoms from ordinary activities. People with NYHA class II heart failure have slight, mild limitations with everyday activities; the person is comfortable at rest or with mild exertion. With NYHA class III heart failure, a marked limitation occurs with any activity; the person is comfortable only at rest. A person with NYHA class IV heart failure is symptomatic at rest and becomes quite uncomfortable with any physical activity. This score documents the severity of symptoms and can be used to assess response to treatment. While its use is widespread, the NYHA score is not very reproducible and does not reliably predict walking distance or exercise tolerance on formal testing.

In its 2001 guidelines, the American College of Cardiology/American Heart Association working group introduced four stages of heart failure:

- Stage A: People at high risk for developing HF in the future, but no functional or structural heart disorder
- Stage B: A structural heart disorder, but no symptoms at any stage
- Stage C: Previous or current symptoms of heart failure in the context of an underlying structural heart problem, but managed with medical treatment
- Stage D: Advanced disease requiring hospital-based support, a heart transplant, or palliative care

The ACC staging system is useful since stage A encompasses "pre-heart failure" – a stage where intervention with treatment can presumably prevent progression to overt symptoms. ACC stage A does not have a corresponding NYHA class. ACC stage B would correspond to NYHA class I. ACC stage C corresponds to NYHA class II and III, while ACC stage D overlaps with NYHA class IV.

- The degree of coexisting illness: i.e. heart failure/systemic hypertension, heart failure/pulmonary hypertension, heart failure/diabetes, heart failure/kidney failure, etc.
- Whether the problem is primarily increased venous back pressure (preload), or failure to supply adequate arterial perfusion (afterload)
- Whether the abnormality is due to low cardiac output with high systemic vascular resistance or high cardiac output with low vascular resistance (low-output heart failure vs. high-output heart failure)

=== Histopathology ===
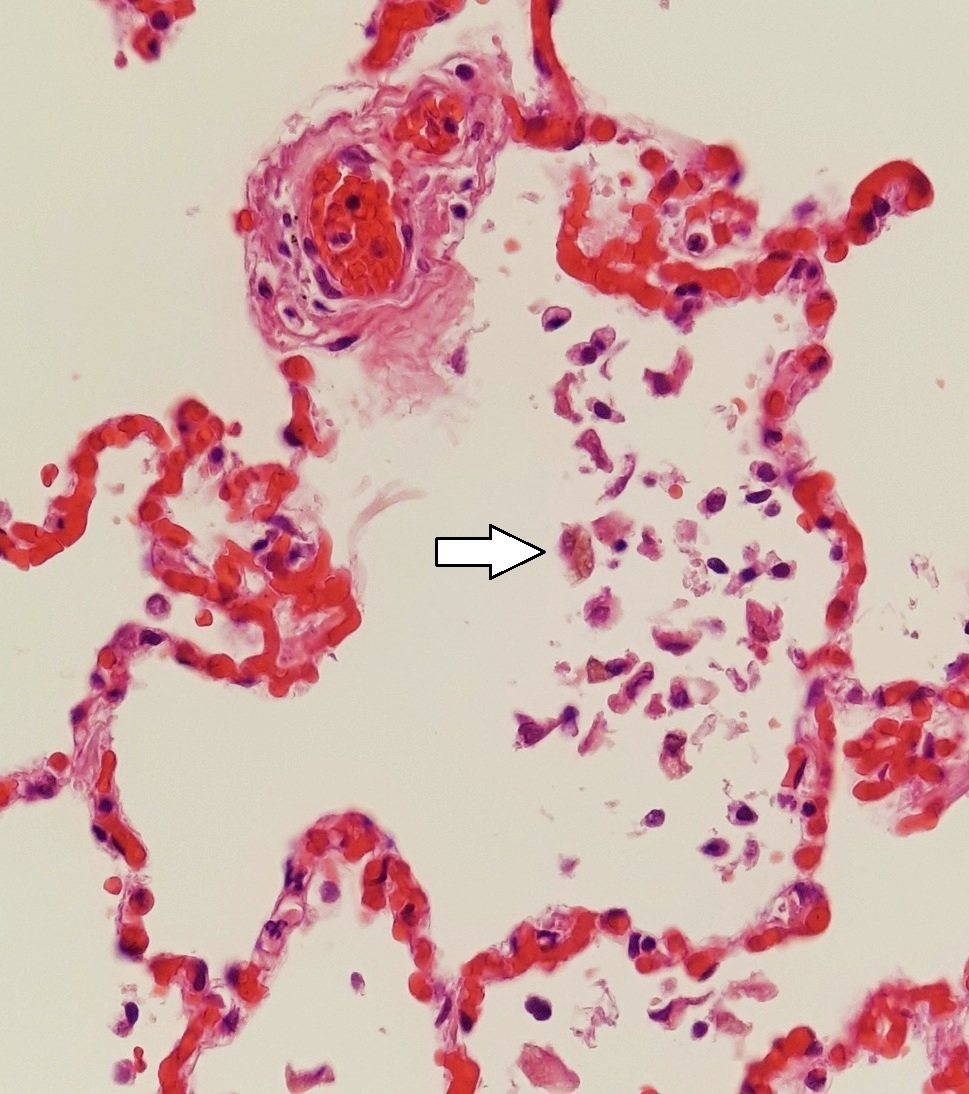
Siderophages (one indicated by white arrow) and pulmonary congestion, indicating left congestive heart failure

Histopathology can diagnose heart failure in autopsies. The presence of siderophages indicates chronic left-sided heart failure, but is not specific for it. It is also indicated by congestion of the pulmonary circulation.

== Prevention ==
A person's risk of developing heart failure is inversely related to the level of physical activity. Those who achieved at least 500 MET-minutes/week (the recommended minimum in U.S. guidelines) had lower heart failure risk than individuals who did not report exercising during their free time; the reduction in heart failure risk was even greater in those who engaged in higher levels of physical activity than the recommended minimum. Heart failure can also be prevented by lowering blood pressure and blood cholesterol, and by controlling diabetes. Maintaining a healthy weight, and decreasing sodium, alcohol, and sugar intake may help. Additionally, avoiding tobacco use has been shown to lower the risk of heart failure.

According to Johns Hopkins and the American Heart Association there are ways to help prevent a cardiac event. Johns Hopkins states that stopping tobacco use, reducing high blood pressure, increasing physical activity, and nutrition can drastically affect the chances of developing heart disease. High blood pressure accounts for most cardiovascular deaths. High blood pressure can be reduced into a normal range by making dietary decisions such as consuming less salt. Exercise also helps to bring blood pressure down. One of the best ways to avoid heart failure is healthier eating habits like eating more vegetables, fruits, grains, and lean protein.

Diabetes is a major risk factor for heart failure. For women with coronary disease, diabetes was the strongest risk factor for heart failure. Diabetic women with depressed creatinine clearance or elevated BMI were at the highest risk of heart failure. While the annual incidence rate of heart failure for non-diabetic women with no risk factors is 0.4%, the annual incidence rate for diabetic women with elevated body mass index (BMI) and depressed creatinine clearance was 7% and 13%, respectively.

== Management ==
Treatment focuses on improving the symptoms and preventing the progression of the disease. Reversible causes of heart failure also need to be addressed (e.g. infection, alcohol ingestion, anemia, thyrotoxicosis, arrhythmia, and hypertension). Treatments include lifestyle and pharmacological modalities, and occasionally various forms of device therapy. Rarely, cardiac transplantation is used as an effective treatment when heart failure has reached the end stage.

=== Acute decompensation ===
In acute decompensated heart failure, the immediate goal is to re-establish adequate perfusion and oxygen delivery to end organs. This entails ensuring that airway, breathing, and circulation are adequate. Immediate treatments usually involve some combination of vasodilators such as nitroglycerin, diuretics such as furosemide, and possibly noninvasive positive pressure ventilation. Supplemental oxygen is indicated in those with oxygen saturation levels below 90%, but is not recommended in those with normal oxygen levels in the normal atmosphere.

=== Chronic management ===
The goals of treatment for people with chronic heart failure are prolonging life, preventing acute decompensation, and reducing symptoms, allowing for greater activity.

Heart failure can result from a variety of conditions. In considering therapeutic options, excluding reversible causes is of primary importance, including thyroid disease, anemia, chronic tachycardia, alcohol use disorder, hypertension, and dysfunction of one or more heart valves. Treatment of the underlying cause is usually the first approach to treating heart failure. In most cases, though, either no primary cause is found or treatment of the primary cause does not restore normal heart function. In these cases, behavioral, medical and device treatment strategies exist that can provide a significant improvement in outcomes, including the relief of symptoms, exercise tolerance, and a decrease in the likelihood of hospitalization or death. Breathlessness rehabilitation for chronic obstructive pulmonary disease and heart failure has been proposed with exercise training as a core component. Rehabilitation should also include other interventions to address shortness of breath including the psychological and educational needs of people and the needs of caregivers. Iron supplementation appears to reduce hospitalization but not all-cause mortality in patients with iron deficiency and heart failure.

==== Advance care planning ====
The latest evidence indicates that advance care planning may help to increase documentation by medical staff regarding discussions with participants and improve an individual's depression. This involves discussing an individual's future care plan, preferences, and values. The findings are, however, based on low-quality evidence.

==== Monitoring ====
The various measures often used to assess the progress of people being treated for heart failure include fluid balance (calculation of fluid intake and excretion) and monitoring body weight (which in the shorter term reflects fluid shifts). Remote monitoring can be effective to reduce complications for people with heart failure.

==== Lifestyle ====
Behavior modification is a primary consideration in chronic heart failure management programs, with dietary guidelines regarding fluid and salt intake. Fluid restriction is important to reduce fluid retention in the body and to correct the hyponatremic status of the body. The evidence of the benefit of reducing salt, however, is poor as of 2018. Thirst is a common and burdensome symptom for patients to cope with. Chewing gum is an effective intervention to relieve thirst in patients experiencing heart failure, although patient acceptability remains an issue.

==== Exercise and physical activity ====
Exercise should be encouraged and tailored to suit an individual's capabilities. A meta-analysis found that center-based group interventions delivered by a physiotherapist help promote physical activity in heart failure. There is a need for additional training for physiotherapists in delivering behavior change intervention alongside an exercise program. An intervention is expected to be more efficacious in encouraging physical activity than the usual care if it includes prompts and cues to walk or exercise, like a phone call or a text message. It is helpful if a trusted clinician provides explicit advice to engage in physical activity. Another strategy is to place objects that will serve as a cue to engage in physical activity in the person's everyday environment, such as an exercise step or treadmill. Encouragement to walk or exercise in various settings beyond is also promising. The inclusion of regular physical conditioning as part of a cardiac rehabilitation program can significantly improve quality of life and reduce the risk of hospital admission for worsening symptoms, but no evidence shows a reduction in mortality rates as a result of exercise.

Home visits and regular monitoring at heart-failure clinics reduce the need for hospitalization and improve life expectancy.

==== Medication ====
Quadruple medical therapy using a combination of angiotensin receptor-neprilysin inhibitors (ARNI), beta blockers, mineralocorticoid receptor antagonists (MRA), and sodium/glucose cotransporter 2 inhibitors (SGLT2 inhibitors) is the standard of care as of 2021 for heart failure with reduced ejection fraction (HFrEF).

There is no convincing evidence for pharmacological treatment of heart failure with preserved ejection fraction (HFpEF). Medication for HFpEF is symptomatic treatment with diuretics to treat congestion. Managing risk factors and comorbidities such as hypertension is recommended in HFpEF.

Inhibitors of the renin–angiotensin system (RAS) are recommended for heart failure. The angiotensin receptor-neprilysin inhibitors (ARNI) sacubitril/valsartan is recommended as the first choice of RAS inhibitors in American guidelines published by AHA/ACC in 2022. Use of ACE inhibitor, or angiotensin receptor blockers (ARBs) if the person develops a long-term cough as a side effect of the ACE-I, is associated with improved survival, fewer hospitalizations for heart failure exacerbations, and improved quality of life in people with heart failure. European guidelines published by ESC in 2021 recommends that ARNI should be used in those who still have symptoms while on an ACE-I or ARB, beta blocker, and a mineralocorticoid receptor antagonist. Use of the combination agent ARNI requires the cessation of ACE-I or ARB therapy at least 36 hours before its initiation.

Beta-adrenergic blocking agents (beta blockers) add to the improvement in symptoms and mortality provided by ACE-I/ARB. The mortality benefits of beta blockers in people with systolic dysfunction who also have atrial fibrillation is more limited than in those who do not have it. If the ejection fraction is not diminished (HFpEF), the benefits of beta blockers are more modest; a decrease in mortality has been observed, but reduction in hospital admission for uncontrolled symptoms has not been observed.

In people who are intolerant of ACE-I and ARB or who have significant kidney dysfunction, the use of combined hydralazine and a long-acting nitrate, such as isosorbide dinitrate, is an effective alternate strategy. This regimen has been shown to reduce mortality in people with moderate heart failure. It is especially beneficial in the black population. (Note: Specifically, in one randomized control trial the patients self-identified as black (defined as of African descent), and in one randomized control trial the patients were defined as black, without further details given.)

Use of a mineralocorticoid antagonist, such as spironolactone or eplerenone, in addition to beta blockers and ACE-I, can improve symptoms and reduce mortality in people with symptomatic heart failure with reduced ejection fraction (HFrEF).

SGLT2 inhibitors are used for heart failure with reduced ejection fraction as they have demonstrated benefits in reducing hospitalizations and mortality, regardless of whether an individual has comorbid Type 2 Diabetes or not.

===== Other medications =====
Second-line medications for CHF do not confer a mortality benefit. Digoxin is one such medication. Its narrow therapeutic window, a high degree of toxicity, and the failure of multiple trials to show a mortality benefit have reduced its role in clinical practice. It is now used in only a small number of people with refractory symptoms, who are in atrial fibrillation, and/or who have chronic hypotension.

Diuretics have been a mainstay of treatment against symptoms of fluid accumulation, and include diuretics classes such as loop diuretics (such as furosemide), thiazide-like diuretics, and potassium-sparing diuretics. Although widely used, evidence on their efficacy and safety is limited, except for mineralocorticoid antagonists such as spironolactone.

Anemia is an independent factor in mortality in people with chronic heart failure. Treatment of anemia significantly improves the quality of life for those with heart failure, often with a reduction in severity of the NYHA classification, and also improves mortality rates. The European Society of Cardiology recommends screening for iron deficiency and treating with intravenous iron if deficiency is found.

The decision to anticoagulate people with HF, typically with left ventricular ejection fractions under 35%, is debated but generally, people with coexisting atrial fibrillation, a prior embolic event, or conditions that increase the risk of an embolic event such as amyloidosis, left ventricular noncompaction, familial dilated cardiomyopathy, or a thromboembolic event in a first-degree relative.

Vasopressin receptor antagonists can also treat heart failure. Conivaptan is the first medication approved by the US Food and Drug Administration for the treatment of euvolemic hyponatremia in those with heart failure. In rare cases hypertonic 3% saline together with diuretics may be used to correct hyponatremia.

Ivabradine is recommended for people with symptomatic heart failure with reduced left ventricular ejection fraction who are receiving optimized guideline-directed therapy (as above) including the maximum tolerated dose of beta-blocker, have a normal heart rhythm and continue to have a resting heart rate above 70 beats per minute. Ivabradine has been found to reduce the risk of hospitalization for heart failure exacerbations in this subgroup of people with heart failure.

==== Implanted devices ====
In people with severe cardiomyopathy (left ventricular ejection fraction below 35%), or in those with recurrent VT or malignant arrhythmias, treatment with an automatic implantable cardioverter-defibrillator (AICD) is indicated to reduce the risk of severe life-threatening arrhythmias. The AICD does not improve symptoms or reduce the incidence of malignant arrhythmias but does reduce mortality from those arrhythmias, often in conjunction with antiarrhythmic medications. In people with left ventricular ejection (LVEF) below 35%, the incidence of ventricular tachycardia or sudden cardiac death is high enough to warrant AICD placement. Its use is therefore recommended in AHA/ACC guidelines.

Cardiac contractility modulation (CCM) is a treatment for people with moderate to severe left ventricular systolic heart failure (NYHA classes II–IV), which enhances both the strength of ventricular contraction and the heart's pumping capacity. The CCM mechanism is based on stimulation of the cardiac muscle by nonexcitatory electrical signals, which are delivered by a pacemaker-like device. CCM is particularly suitable for the treatment of heart failure with normal QRS complex duration (120 ms or less) and has been demonstrated to improve the symptoms, quality of life, and exercise tolerance. CCM is approved for use in Europe, and was approved by the Food and Drug Administration for use in the United States in 2019.

About one-third of people with an LVEF below 35% have markedly altered conduction to the ventricles, resulting in dyssynchronous depolarization of the right and left ventricles. This is especially problematic in people with left bundle branch block (blockage of one of the two primary conducting fiber bundles that originate at the base of the heart and carry depolarizing impulses to the left ventricle). Using a special pacing algorithm, biventricular cardiac resynchronization therapy (CRT) can initiate a normal sequence of ventricular depolarization. In people with LVEF below 35% and prolonged QRS duration on ECG (LBBB or QRS of 150 ms or more), an improvement in symptoms and mortality occurs when CRT is added to standard medical therapy. However, in the two-thirds of people without prolonged QRS duration, CRT may be harmful.

==== Surgical therapies ====
People with the most severe heart failure may be candidates for ventricular assist devices, which have commonly been used as a bridge to heart transplantation but have been used more recently as a destination treatment for advanced heart failure. Coronary bypass surgery may also be used to move blood around clogged arteries in cases when heart failure is caused by arterial blockages. Surgical ventricular reconstruction is an advanced technique, particularly if the heart failure is associated with pseudoaneurysm. In people not fit for this type of surgery, a medical device to reduced left ventricular volume, while supporting the left ventricular wall (Revivent), has been used with some success in small studies.

In select cases, heart transplantation can be considered. While this may resolve the problems associated with heart failure, the person must generally remain on an immunosuppressive regimen to prevent rejection, which has its own significant downsides. A major limitation of this treatment option is the scarcity of hearts available for transplantation.

=== Palliative care ===
People with heart failure often have significant symptoms, such as chest pain and shortness of breath. Palliative care should be initiated early in the HF trajectory, and should not be an option of last resort. Palliative care can not only provide symptom management, but also assist with advanced care planning, goals of care in the case of a significant decline, and making sure the person has a medical power of attorney and has discussed his or her wishes with this individual. A 2016 and 2017 review found that palliative care is associated with improved outcomes, such as quality of life, symptom burden, and satisfaction with care.

Without transplantation, heart failure may not be reversible and heart function typically deteriorates with time. The growing number of people with stage IV heart failure (intractable symptoms of fatigue, shortness of breath, or chest pain at rest despite optimal medical therapy) should be considered for palliative care or hospice, according to American College of Cardiology/American Heart Association guidelines.

== Prognosis ==
Prognosis in heart failure can be assessed in multiple ways, including clinical prediction rules and cardiopulmonary exercise testing. Clinical prediction rules use a composite of clinical factors such as laboratory tests and blood pressure to estimate prognosis. Among several clinical prediction rules for prognosticating acute heart failure, the 'EFFECT rule' slightly outperformed other rules in stratifying people and identifying those at low risk of death during hospitalization or within 30 days. Easy methods for identifying people that are low-risk are:

- The ADHERE Tree rule indicates that people with blood urea nitrogen < 43 mg/dL and systolic blood pressure at least 115 mm Hg have less than 10% chance of inpatient death or complications.
- The BWH rule indicates that people with systolic blood pressure over 90 mm Hg, respiratory rate of 30 or fewer breaths per minute, serum sodium over 135 mmol/L, and no new ST–T wave changes have less than 10% chance of inpatient death or complications.

A crucial method for assessing prognosis in people with advanced heart failure is cardiopulmonary exercise testing (CPX testing). CPX testing is usually required before heart transplantation as an indicator of prognosis. CPX testing involves the measurement of exhaled oxygen and carbon dioxide during exercise. The peak oxygen consumption (VO_{2} max) is used as an indicator of prognosis. As a general rule, a VO_{2} max less than 12–14 cc/kg/min indicates poor survival and suggests that the person may be a candidate for a heart transplant. People with a VO_{2} max <10 cc/kg/min have a poorer prognosis. The most recent International Society for Heart and Lung Transplantation guidelines also suggest two other parameters that can be used for evaluation of prognosis in advanced heart failure, the heart failure survival score and the use of a criterion of VE/VCO_{2} slope > 35 from the CPX test. The heart failure survival score is calculated using a combination of clinical predictors and the VO_{2} max from the CPX test.

Heart failure is associated with significantly reduced physical and mental health, resulting in a markedly decreased quality of life. With the exception of heart failure caused by reversible conditions, the condition usually worsens with time. Although some people survive many years, progressive disease is associated with an overall annual mortality rate of 10%.

Around 18 of every 1000 persons will experience an ischemic stroke during the first year after diagnosis of heart failure. As the duration of follow-up increases, the stroke rate rises to nearly 50 strokes per 1000 cases of heart failure by 5 years.

== Epidemiology ==
In 2022, heart failure affected about 64 million people globally. Overall, around 2% of adults have heart failure. In those over the age of 75, rates are greater than 10%.

Rates are predicted to increase. Increasing rates are mostly because of increasing lifespan, but also because of increased risk factors (hypertension, diabetes, dyslipidemia, and obesity) and improved survival rates from other types of cardiovascular disease (myocardial infarction, valvular disease, and arrhythmias). Heart failure is the leading cause of hospitalization in people older than 65.

=== United States ===
In the United States, heart failure affects 5.8 million people, and each year 550,000 new cases are diagnosed. In 2011, heart failure was the most common reason for hospitalization for adults aged 85 years and older, and the second-most common for adults aged 65–84 years. An estimated one in five adults at age 40 will develop heart failure during their remaining lifetimes and about half of people who develop heart failure die within 5 years of diagnosis. Heart failure – much higher in African Americans, Hispanics, Native Americans, and recent immigrants from Eastern Europe countries – has been linked in these ethnic minority populations to the high incidence of diabetes and hypertension.

Nearly one of every four people (24.7%) hospitalized in the U.S. with congestive heart failure is readmitted within 30 days. Additionally, more than 50% of people seek readmission within 6 months after treatment and the average duration of hospital stay is 6 days. Heart failure is a leading cause of hospital readmissions in the U.S. People aged 65 and older were readmitted at a rate of 24.5 per 100 admissions in 2011. In the same year, heart failure patients under Medicaid were readmitted at a rate of 30.4 per 100 admissions, and uninsured people were readmitted at a rate of 16.8 per 100 admissions. These are the highest readmission rates for both categories. Notably, heart failure was not among the top-10 conditions with the most 30-day readmissions among the privately insured.

=== United Kingdom ===
In the UK, despite moderate improvements in prevention, heart failure rates have increased due to population growth and aging. Overall heart failure rates are similar to the four most common causes of cancer (breast, lung, prostate, and colon) combined. People from deprived backgrounds are more likely to be diagnosed with heart failure at a younger age.

=== Developing world ===
In tropical countries, the most common cause of heart failure is valvular heart disease or some type of cardiomyopathy. As underdeveloped countries have become more affluent, the incidences of diabetes, hypertension, and obesity have increased, which have in turn raised the incidence of heart failure.

=== Sex ===
Men have a higher incidence of heart failure, but the overall prevalence rate is similar in both sexes since women survive longer after the onset of heart failure. Women tend to be older when diagnosed with heart failure (after menopause), they are more likely than men to have diastolic dysfunction, and seem to experience a lower overall quality of life than men after diagnosis.

=== Ethnicity ===
Some sources state that people of Asian descent are at a higher risk of heart failure than other ethnic groups. Other sources, however, have found that rates of heart failure are similar to rates found in other ethnic groups.

== History ==
For centuries, the disease entity which would include many cases of what today would be called heart failure was dropsy; the term denotes generalized edema, a major manifestation of a failing heart, though also caused by other diseases. Writings of ancient civilizations include evidence of their acquaintance with dropsy and heart failure: Egyptians were the first to use bloodletting to relieve fluid accumulation and shortage of breath, and provided what may have been the first documented observations on heart failure in the Ebers papyrus (around 1500 BCE). Greeks described cases of dyspnea, fluid retention and fatigue compatible with heart failure.

Romans used the flowering plant Drimia maritima (sea squill), which contains cardiac glycosides, for the treatment of dropsy; descriptions pertaining to heart failure are also known in the civilizations of ancient India and China. However, the manifestations of failing heart were understood in the context of these peoples' medical theories – including ancient Egyptian religion, Hippocratic theory of humours, or ancient Indian and Chinese medicine, and the current concept of heart failure had not developed yet. Although shortage of breath had been connected to heart disease by Avicenna round 1000 CE, decisive for modern understanding of the nature of the condition were the description of pulmonary circulation by Ibn al-Nafis in the 13th century, and of systemic circulation by William Harvey in 1628.

The role of the heart in fluid retention began to be better appreciated, as dropsy of the chest (fluid accumulation in and around the lungs causing shortness of breath) became more familiar and the current concept of heart failure, which brings together swelling and shortage of breath due to fluid retention, began to be accepted, in the 17th and especially in the 18th century: Richard Lower linked dyspnea and foot swelling in 1679, and Giovanni Maria Lancisi connected jugular vein distention with right ventricular failure in 1728. Dropsy attributable to other causes, e.g. kidney failure, was differentiated in the 19th century. The stethoscope, invented by René Laennec in 1819, x-rays, discovered by Wilhelm Röntgen in 1895, and electrocardiography, described by Willem Einthoven in 1903, facilitated the investigation of heart failure.

The 19th century also saw experimental and conceptual advances in the physiology of heart contraction, which led to the formulation of the Frank-Starling law of the heart (named after physiologists Otto Frank and Ernest Starling), a remarkable advance in understanding mechanisms of heart failure.

One of the earliest treatments of heart failure, relief of swelling by bloodletting with various methods, including leeches, continued through the centuries. Along with bloodletting, Jean-Baptiste de Sénac in 1749 recommended opiates for acute shortage of breath due to heart failure. In 1785, William Withering described the therapeutic uses of the foxglove genus of plants in the treatment of edema; their extract contains cardiac glycosides, including digoxin, still used today in the treatment of heart failure. The diuretic effects of inorganic mercury salts, which were used to treat syphilis, had already been noted in the 16th century by Paracelsus; in the 19th century they were used by noted physicians like John Blackall and William Stokes. In the meantime, cannulae (tubes) invented by English physician Reginald Southey in 1877 was another method of removing excess fluid by directly inserting into swollen limbs.

Use of organic mercury compounds as diuretics, beyond their role in syphilis treatment, started in 1920, though it was limited by their parenteral route of administration and their side-effects. Oral mercurial diuretics were introduced in the 1950s; so were thiazide diuretics, which caused less toxicity, and are still used. Around the same time, the invention of echocardiography by Inge Edler and Hellmuth Hertz in 1954 marked a new era in the evaluation of heart failure. In the 1960s, loop diuretics were added to available treatments of fluid retention, while a patient with heart failure received the first heart transplant by Christiaan Barnard. Over the following decades, new drug classes found their place in heart failure therapeutics, including vasodilators like hydralazine; renin-angiotensin system inhibitors; and beta-blockers.

== Economics ==
In 2011, nonhypertensive heart failure was one of the 10 most expensive conditions seen during inpatient hospitalizations in the U.S., with aggregate inpatient hospital costs more than $10.5 billion.

Heart failure is associated with a high health expenditure, mostly because of the cost of hospitalizations; costs have been estimated to amount to 2% of the total budget of the National Health Service in the United Kingdom, and more than $35 billion in the United States.

== Research directions ==
Some research indicates that stem cell therapy may help. Although this research indicated benefits of stem cell therapy, other research does not indicate benefit. There is tentative evidence of longer life expectancy and improved left ventricular ejection fraction in persons treated with bone marrow-derived stem cells.

The maintenance of heart function depends on appropriate gene expression that is regulated at multiple levels by epigenetic mechanisms including DNA methylation and histone post-translational modification. Currently, an increasing body of research is directed at understanding the role of perturbations of epigenetic processes in cardiac hypertrophy and fibrotic scarring.
