= Cervico-thoracic ratio =

The cervico-thoracic ratio (CTR) is a method developed by Norlander et al. for measuring segmental mobility in the spine between the C7 vertebra and the T5 vertebra in flexion. The method has been developed to fulfil clinical demands of quick examinations. With this method, the observer can see if there is an increased respectively decreased mobility in a specific motion segment. The CTR technique measures both segmental and total skin distractions. It compares the degree of segmental flexion mobility by establishing a ratio between segmental and total skin distraction. First the skin distraction in cm is measured using a special transparent measuring strip and a pen, the absolute mobility. Then absolute values are calculated in a computer program, CTR graph 5.2. Relative values are shown in percent. Each person has totally 100% mobility in the area C7-T5. The relative values show how many percent of the total mobility that is related to in each motion segment. After each measure, a curve called the CTR profile is calculated.

Norlander has created a classification system for relative segmental flexion mobility between C7-T5. Three classes of flexion mobility were defined ordinary, hypo- and hypermobility. Ordinary mobility was based on relative flexion mobility between the lower and the upper quartile for each motion segment between C7-T5. Hypomobility was based on relative flexion mobility below the lower quartile for each motion segment, between C7-T5. Hypermobility was based on the upper quartile for each motion segment, between C7-T5. From this classification a normal curve for the relative segmental flexion mobility has been calculated. CTR have high intratester repeatability with a coefficient of variation (CV) not exceeding 5% and a good intertester repeatability with a CV not exceeding 8%. The CTR technique show a high correlation between vertebral flexion mobility and skin distraction. The validity of the CTR technique was evaluated in a radiological study. Six small metal markings were glued to the skin with 30 mm intervals according to the CTR technique. The markers were glued with the subject in an upright posture and the upper marking placed over the most prominent part of the spinous process of the C7. Lateral radiographs were used to obtain overlay measurements of the alteration of the vertebral angles and of skin markers. The CTR is a valid technique. No other research has been made for validity and reliability. Previous studies with CTR have examined the relationship between segmental mobility C7-T5 and neck- shoulder pain. A significant correlation was found between decreased mobility in motion segment C7-T1 and T1-T2 and increased risk for neck- shoulder pain. Norlander and Nordgren have also shown that several clinical symptoms show relationship to segmental mobility examined with CTR. A significant correlation was found between decreased mobility in C7-T2 and experience of hand weakness and headache.
