= Chandra R. Bhat =

Indian-American engineering professor

- Born: 1964 (age 61–62); Madras, India
- Education: IIT Madras (B.Tech.), Virginia Tech (M.S.), Northwestern University (Ph.D.)
- Known for: Travel behavior modeling, Travel demand modeling, Discrete choice analysis, Consumer choice analysis, Activity-based modeling
- Awards: W.N. Carey Jr. Distinguished Service Award (TRB), Theodore M. Matson Memorial Award (ITE), Frank M. Masters Transportation Engineering Award (ASCE), Humboldt Research Award, CUTC Lifetime Achievement Award
- Scientific career
- Fields: Civil engineering, Transportation research, Travel demand modeling, Econometrics, Discrete choice analysis
- Workplaces: University of Texas at Austin

Chandra R. Bhat (born 1964) is an Indian-American civil engineer, transportation researcher, and academic known for the development of econometric methods for consumer choice analysis, travel behavior and demand modeling, discrete choice analysis, and transportation systems planning. He is the University Distinguished Teaching Professor and Joe J. King Chair in Engineering at the University of Texas at Austin. He is currently a faculty member in the civil, architectural, and environmental engineering department, as well as an adjunct faculty member in the economics department.

== Education ==
Bhat was born in Madras, India in 1964. Bhat earned a B.Tech. in Civil Engineering from the Indian Institute of Technology Madras in 1985 (where his father was professor of electrical and communications engineering), an M.S. in Transportation Engineering from Virginia Polytechnic Institute and State University in 1987, and a Ph.D. in Civil Engineering from Northwestern University in 1991.

== Career ==
After completing his doctorate under the supervision of Frank Koppelman, Bhat served as a research assistant professor and lecturer at Northwestern University’s Transportation Center and later as assistant professor at the University of Massachusetts Amherst (1993–1997). He joined The University of Texas at Austin in 1997, where he has held positions as professor (2005–), associate department chair (2001–2007), and director of the Center for Transportation Research (2012–2018). In 2023, he was named director of the U.S. Department of Transportation’s National Center for Understanding Future Travel Behavior and Demand.

Bhat has been cited as a transportation expert in national media, including The New York Times, the Washington Post, and the public radio program Marketplace, as well as in Newsweek, NPR’s KUT Austin, and the Houston Chronicle.

== Awards and honors ==
Bhat has received national and international awards. In 2024, he received the W.N. Carey Jr. Distinguished Service Award from the Transportation Research Board (TRB). Two years earlier, he received the Theodore M. Matson Memorial Award from the Institute of Transportation Engineers (ITE). In 2017, he received the Lifetime Achievement Award from the Council of University Transportation Centers (CUTC). He was named a Distinguished Alumnus of IIT Madras in 2016, and received the Frank M. Masters Transportation Engineering Award from the American Society of Civil Engineers (ASCE) in 2015. He was awarded the Humboldt Research Award in 2013 by the Alexander von Humboldt Foundation, and received the S.S. Steinberg Award in 2009 from the American Road and Transportation Builders Association. The Eno Center for Transportation listed him among the Top 10 Transportation Thought Leaders in Academia in 2016, and he was profiled in the November–December 2013 issue of TR News. He was also featured as one of six scientists by The Week magazine in the article The Indian Scientific Invasion. From 2019 to 2024, Bhat was listed among the most-cited researchers in transportation and logistics in the standardized citation indicators compiled by Ioannidis and colleagues.

== Research Contributions ==
Bhat has published over 280 peer-reviewed journal articles. One of his chief substantive contributions is the development of the Comprehensive Econometric Microsimulator for Daily Activity Patterns (CEMDAP) and Comprehensive Econometric Microsimulator for SocioEconomics, Landuse, and Transportation Systems (CEMSELTS), both agent-based simulation platforms that have been used for transportation and mobility planning in the New York metropolitan area. His methodological contributions include proposing the use of quasi-Monte Carlo (QMC) techniques for the simulation estimation of discrete choice models, later recognized by Daniel McFadden in his Nobel Prize Lecture and accompanying 2001 American Economic Review article. He also introduced the multiple discrete-continuous extreme value (MDCEV) model for consumer choice, which was highlighted by Hensher and Rose as a foundational contribution in the field.

== Professional service ==
Bhat served as the President of the Council of University Transportation Centers (2020–2021) and as President of the ASCE Transportation and Development Institute (T&DI). He is the Editor-in-Chief of Transportation Research Part B: Methodological.

== Selected publications ==
- Bhat, Chandra R. (2001). "Quasi-random maximum simulated likelihood estimation of the mixed multinomial logit model". Transportation Research Part B: Methodological. 35 (7): 677–693. Bibcode:2001TRPB...35..677B. doi:10.1016/S0191-2615(00)00014-X. hdl:2152/23965.
- Bhat, Chandra R. (2005). "A multiple discrete–continuous extreme value model: Formulation and application to discretionary time-use decisions". Transportation Research Part B: Methodological. 39 (8): 679–707. Bibcode:2005TRPB...39..679B. doi:10.1016/j.trb.2004.08.003.
- Bhat, Chandra R.; Sener, Ipek N.; Eluru, Naveen (2010). "A flexible spatially dependent discrete choice model: Formulation and application to teenagers' weekday recreational activity participation". Transportation Research Part B: Methodological. 44 (8–9): 903–921. Bibcode:2010TRPB...44..903B. doi:10.1016/j.trb.2010.02.003.
- Bhat, Chandra R.; Lavieri, Patrícia S. (2018). "A new mixed MNP model accommodating a variety of dependent non-normal coefficient distributions". Theory and Decision. 84 (2): 239–275. doi:10.1007/s11238-017-9638-4.
- Mannering, Fred; Bhat, Chandra R.; Shankar, Venky; Abdel-Aty, Mohamed (2020). "Big data, traditional data and the tradeoffs between prediction and causality in highway-safety analysis". Analytic Methods in Accident Research. 25 100113. doi:10.1016/j.amar.2020.100113.
- Mannering, Fred L.; Bhat, Chandra R. (2014). "Analytic methods in accident research: Methodological frontier and future directions". Analytic Methods in Accident Research. 1: 1–22. doi:10.1016/j.amar.2013.09.001.
- Bhat, Chandra R.; Guo, Jessica Y. (2007). "A comprehensive analysis of built environment characteristics on household residential choice and auto ownership levels". Transportation Research Part B: Methodological. 41 (5): 506–526. Bibcode:2007TRPB...41..506B. doi:10.1016/j.trb.2005.12.005.
- Bhat, Chandra R. (1997). "An Endogenous Segmentation Mode Choice Model with an Application to Intercity Travel". Transportation Science. 31: 34–48. doi:10.1287/trsc.31.1.34.

== Books and edited volumes ==
- Bhat, C.R. (2014). The Composite Marginal Likelihood (CML) Inference Approach with Applications to Discrete and Mixed Dependent Variable Models. Foundations and Trends in Econometrics, 7(1). Now Publishers, Boston.
- Bhat, C.R. (ed.) (2021). International Conference on Transportation and Development 2021: Transportation Operations, Technologies, and Safety. Transportation & Development Institute, American Society of Civil Engineers, Reston, VA.
- Bhat, C.R. (ed.) (2021). International Conference on Transportation and Development 2021: Transportation Planning and Development. Transportation & Development Institute, American Society of Civil Engineers, Reston, VA.
