= Contemporary Theatre Review =

- Discipline: Theatre
- Language: English
- Edited by: Maria M. Delgado (University of London), Maggie B. Gale (University of Manchester), and Dominic Johnson (University of London)

Publication details
- History: 1992 to present
- Publisher: Routledge with the support of Queen Mary University of London (United Kingdom)
- Frequency: Quarterly

Standard abbreviations
- ISO 4: Contemp. Theatre Rev.

Indexing
- ISSN: 1048-6801 (print); 1477-2264 (web)

Links
- Journal homepage; Journal at Taylor & Francis Online

Contemporary Theatre Review is a quarterly peer-reviewed academic journal published by Routledge and covering all aspects of theatre, live art, performance art, opera, dance, digital performance, activist and applied performance, theatre design, and connections between time-based arts and visual arts. The journal was established in 1992 and the editors-in-chief are Maria M. Delgado (University of London), Maggie B. Gale (University of Manchester), and Dominic Johnson (University of London).

== Abstracting and indexing ==
The journal is abstracted and indexed in the British Humanities Index, Scopus, Current Contents/Arts & Humanities, and the Arts & Humanities Citation Index.
