= Cardiovascular and pulmonary physiotherapy =

Medical interventions

Physiotherapists treating patients following uncomplicated coronary artery bypass surgery (also called coronary artery bypass graft surgery, or CABG) surgery continue to use interventions such as deep breathing exercises that are not supported by best available evidence. Standardised guidelines may be required to better match clinical practice with current literature.

== Diseases and conditions treated ==
=== Cystic fibrosis ===
Cystic fibrosis (CF), also known as mucoviscidosis, is a genetic disorder that affects mostly the lungs, but also the pancreas, liver, kidneys, and intestines. Major advances over the past few years in the management of cystic fibrosis (CF) have resulted in dramatic improvements in longevity and quality of life for many patients. However, respiratory dysfunction remains responsible for much of the morbidity and mortality associated with the disorder. Physiotherapy has long played an important role in the respiratory management of the disease, and has had to adapt to the changes in disease pattern from infancy to adulthood. The role of the physiotherapist is not limited to airway clearance, but also includes encouragement and advice regarding exercise, posture and mobility, inhalation therapy and, in the later stages of the disease process, non-invasive respiratory support. It is generally felt that the use of chest physiotherapy in CF has lacked good scientific basis, and the current call for evidence-based medicine requires physiotherapists to scrutinize their practice closely.

=== Chronic obstructive pulmonary disease ===
Chronic obstructive pulmonary disease (COPD) is a type of obstructive lung disease characterized by chronically poor airflow. It typically worsens over time. The main symptoms include shortness of breath, cough, and excessive mucus production. As COPD gets worse, shortness of breath worsens making eating, exercising or breathing much more difficult.

=== Deep vein thrombosis ===
Deep vein thrombosis (DVT), or deep venous thrombosis, is the formation of a blood clot (thrombus) within a deep vein, most commonly the legs. Nonspecific signs may include pain, swelling, redness, warmness, and engorged superficial veins. Pulmonary embolism, a potentially life-threatening complication, is caused by the detachment (embolization) of a clot that travels to the lungs. Together, DVT and pulmonary embolism constitute a single disease process known as venous thromboembolism.

== Techniques ==
=== Active cycle of breathing techniques ===
The active cycle of breathing techniques (ACBT) is a flexible regimen comprising breathing control, thoracic expansion exercises and the FET, frequently combined with gravity-assisted positioning. Increasing lung volumes during thoracic expansion allows air to get behind distal secretions via collateral ventilatory channels. During a forced expiratory manoeuvre, compression and narrowing occurs within the airways at a point dependent on lung volume (the equal pressure point). This is shifted distally as a forced expiration is continued to low lung volume, thereby mobilizing peripheral secretions.

This technique has been reported to be an effective and efficient means of airway clearance with documented improvements in lung function and no detrimental effect on oxygen saturation. In comparative studies the ACBT has been found to be advantageous when compared with CCPT, Flutter, and PEP. When compared with the technique of autogenic drainage (AD) Miller et al., reported no differences in efficacy, although ACBT was associated with oxygen desaturation in some cases. There was, however, no significant overall difference in saturation between the two techniques. A more recent comparison of the Flutter and forced expiration with the ACBT reported no significant differences between the treatments for sputum weight, lung function tests or oxygen saturation.

== Assessment tests ==
=== 6 minute walk test ===
Pulmonary rehabilitation is an evidence-based intervention for the management of patients with chronic obstructive pulmonary disease (COPD). In clinical practice, the 6-minute walk test (6MWT) is commonly used to assess changes in functional exercise capacity in COPD patients following pulmonary rehabilitation with the primary outcome reported being the distance walked during the test (i.e. 6MWD). The 6MWD has demonstrated validity and reliability after one familiarisation test and the capacity to detect changes following pulmonary rehabilitation. In addition to assessing the outcomes of pulmonary rehabilitation, 6MWD may be used to quantify the magnitude of a patient's disability, prescribe a walking programme, identify patients likely to benefit from a rollator and to identify the presence of exercise-induced hypoxemia.

== Current concepts ==
Randomized trials have demonstrated that pulmonary rehabilitation (PR) can improve dyspnea, exercise tolerance, and health-related quality of life. Rehabilitation has traditionally been provided in secondary care to patients with moderate to severe disease. However, current concepts are recommending that it should be delivered in a primary and community care setting for patients with milder disease.

There are several opportunities for spreading the word for PR in primary care. One of these is to improve access to PR for all those disabled by their disease by the increase of community schemes. One such scheme being utilised in Canada is reviewed. The essential components of PR include behavior change, patient self-management and prescriptive exercise. In the last decade new strategies have been developed to enhance the effects of exercise training. An overview of these new approaches being an adjunct to exercise training is reviewed. Although the role of exercise training is well established, we are only just beginning to appreciate the importance of behavior change and patient self-management in contributing to improved health and diminished healthcare resource utilisation.

== Cardiovascular rehabilitation programmes ==
A 2016 Cochrane review has shown that exercise-based cardiovascular rehabilitation programmes reduce cardiovascular mortality and hospitalization. They also seem to improve Health-related quality of life in younger men recovering from a myocardial infarction or from a post-revascularisation surgery. It remains unclear to what extent these findings may be applicable to female patients.

== Pulmonary rehabilitation programmes ==
Pulmonary rehabilitation has been shown to be effective treat patients with Chronic Obstructive Pulmonary Disease (COPD) after an exacerbation episode. These programmes appear to improve exercise capacity, health-related quality of life and lower the risk of being readmitted to hospital.
