= Cardiac resynchronization therapy =

Treatment for heart failure

Implanted cardiac resynchronization device
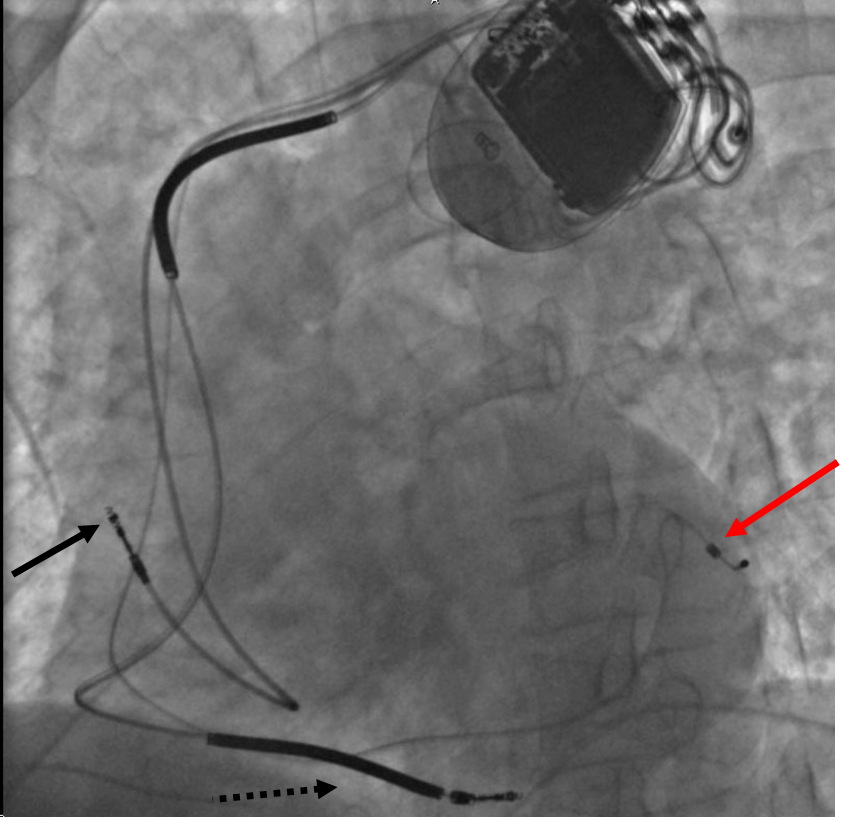
- ICD-9-CM: 00.51, 00.54
- MeSH: D058409
- eMedicine: 1839506-devices
- [edit on Wikidata]

Cardiac resynchronisation therapy (CRT or CRT-P) is the insertion of electrodes in the left and right ventricles of the heart, as well as on occasion the right atrium, to treat heart failure by coordinating the function of the left and right ventricles via a pacemaker, a small device inserted into the anterior chest wall.

CRT is indicated in patients with a low ejection fraction (typically <35%) indicating heart failure, where electrical activity has been compromised, with prolonged QRS duration to >120 ms.

The insertion of electrodes into the ventricles is done under local anesthetic, with access to the ventricles most commonly via the subclavian vein, although access may be conferred from the axillary or cephalic veins. Right ventricular access is direct, while left ventricular access is conferred via the coronary sinus (CS).

CRT defibrillators (CRT-D) also incorporate the additional function of an implantable cardioverter-defibrillator (ICD), to quickly terminate an abnormally fast, life-threatening heart rhythm. CRT and CRT-D have become increasingly important therapeutic options for patients with moderate and severe heart failure. CRT with pacemaker only is often termed "CRT-P" to help distinguish it from CRT with defibrillator (CRT-D).

== Indications ==
The key indication for CRT is left bundle branch block (LBBB) of the heart, a cardiac abnormality leading to delayed left ventricular contraction. LBBB causes a QRS prolongation of ≥120 ms on the electrocardiogram, contributing to poor left ventricular coordination and reduced systolic function, thereby reduced ejection fraction (<35%). This reduction in ejection fraction is considered heart failure.

Heart failure patients are generally considered if in New York Heart Association (NYHA) class II or III heart failure. Current National Institute for Health and Care Excellence (NICE) guidelines state that CRT-D device placement is inappropriate for class IV heart failure, but placement of CRT-P devices may be appropriate in certain circumstances.

NICE Guidelines for Treatment Options with ICD or CRT for Heart Failure Patients with Left Ventricular Dysfunction with an LVEF of 35% or less
	NYHA Class			
QRS interval	I	II	III	IV
<120 milliseconds	ICD only if high risk of sudden cardiac death			Not indicated
120–149 milliseconds without LBBB	ICD only	ICD only	ICD only	CRT-P
120–149 milliseconds with LBBB	ICD only	CRT-D	CRT-P or CRT-D	CRT-P
≥150 milliseconds with or without LBBB	CRT-D	CRT-D	CRT-P or CRT-D	CRT-P

== Method ==
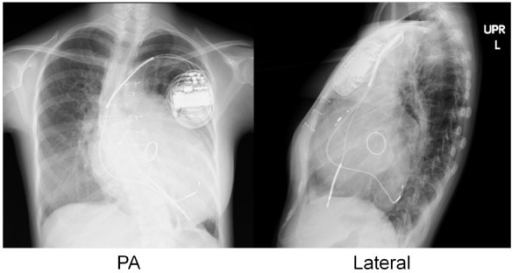
Chest radiographs of cardiac resynchronization therapy with defibrillator (CRT-D) in an individual with dilated cardiomyopathy after mitral valve replacement (MVR). The leads are: Atrial lead at the right appendage; Right ventricular lead at the apex; Left ventricular lead through the coronary sinus.

CRT requires the placement of an electrical device for biventricular pacing, along with placement of (at least) two pacing leads, to facilitate stable left ventricular and right ventricular pacing. For all elements, the first stage of the process is local anaesthetic followed by incision to allow for approach from the appropriate vein. From here, the leads and device can be inserted.

=== Right ventricular lead placement ===
A venipuncture is made, and a guide wire inserted into the vein, where it is guided, with use of real time X-ray imaging, through to the right ventricle. The guide wire is then used to assist in the placement of the electrode lead, which travels through the venous system into the right ventricle where the electrode is embedded.

=== Left ventricular lead placement ===
This is generally performed subsequent to RV lead placement, with the RV lead providing a backup in case of accidental damage to the electric fibers of the heart, causing an asystolic event. As with the RV lead, a guide wire is first inserted, allowing for the insertion of a multi-delivery catheter. The catheter is subsequently maneuvered to the opening of the coronary sinus in the right atrium. From here a contrast media is injected, allowing the surgical team to obtain a coronary sinus phlebogram to direct the placement of the lead into the most suitable coronary vein.

Once the phlebogram has been obtained, the multi-delivery catheter is used to guide in the lead, from the chosen vein of entry, into the right atrium, through the coronary sinus and into the relevant cardiac vein.

Left ventricular lead placement is the most complicated and potentially hazardous element of the operation, due to the significant variability of coronary venous structure. Alterations in heart structure, fatty deposits, valves and natural variations all cause additional complications in the process of cannulation. However, this risk can be reduced using AI-based preoperative visualization of LV venous anatomy using computer tomography (CT) imaging.

=== Device placement ===
The device is inserted in a subcutaneous pocket created by the surgeon, the choice of left or right side of the chest wall is determined mainly by the patient's preference or location of preexisting device. The device, similar to that of a traditional pacemaker, is generally no larger than a pocket watch and has inserts for the electrode leads.

== Benefits ==
Several studies have also shown that CRT can decrease mortality, reverse left ventricular remodeling, and improve quality of life, walking distance, and peak oxygen uptake (VO_{2} max). A 2013 study showed that CRT improved the left ventricular ejection fraction (LVEF) by an average of 10.6% 12 months after placement.

== Complications ==
Key complications include:

- Dissection or perforation of coronary sinus which can in turn cause pericardial effusion
- Inability to cannulate coronary sinus (approximately 5% of patients)
- Bleeding and pocket haematoma, each of which with an incidence of less than 1%
- Myocardial perforation, pneumothorax and infection, all of which have an incidence of less than 1%

== Technology ==
Several research papers have proposed software platforms for planning and guiding the implantation of CRT devices. This research proposes using pre-operative images to characterize tissue and left ventricle activation to identify potential target regions for deploying the CRT leads.
