= International Journal of Transportation Science and Technology =

- Discipline: Transportation, Civil and Structural Engineering
- Language: English
- Edited by: Wei (David) Fan and Zhongyin Guo

Publication details
- History: 2012–present
- Publisher: Tongji University Press Co., Ltd. (China)
- Frequency: Quarterly
- Open access: Yes
- Impact factor: 4.8 (2024)

Standard abbreviations
- ISO 4: Int. J. Transp. Sci. Technol.

Indexing
- ISSN: 2046-0430 (print); 2046-0449 (web)

Links
- Journal homepage; Online Access

International Journal of Transportation Science and Technology (IJTST) is a peer-reviewed and open-access academic journal covering research on transportation systems. It is sponsored by Tongji University and published by Tongji University Press. It collaborates with Elsevier B.V. on behalf of KeAi Communications Co. Ltd. for online publishing. The journal was founded in 2012 by Prof. Zhongyin Guo (Tongji University), Dr. Zhongren Wang (California Department of Transportation), and Dr. Chiu Liu (California Department of Transportation). The current editors-in-chief are Wei (David) Fan (University of North Carolina) and Zhongyin Guo (Tongji University).

== Overview and history ==
IJTST is a single-blind peer-reviewed journal that publishes research on science and technology related to passenger and freight transportation. The journal covers studies across multiple modes of transportation, with topics including safety, efficiency, reliability, resilience, and sustainability. The journal focuses on scientific and technological aspects of transportation systems, and also includes research examining the implications of new technologies for the planning, design, construction, maintenance, and operation of transportation infrastructure and facilities.

The journal was initially published by Multi-Science Publishing in the United Kingdom upon its launch in 2012. In 2016, ownership transferred to Tongji University and Tongji University Press, and the journal began international online publication through Elsevier. In April 2024, the journal was assigned the CN serial number CN31-2204/U by the National Press and Publication Administration of China.

== Editors ==
The editorial board comprises 45 experts from 13 countries, including Prof. Jianlong Zheng (academician of Chinese Academy of Engineering), three chairpersons of American Transportation Research Board committees, three Eisenhower Presidential Scholars, four National Science Foundation CAREER award winners, and Nadia Gkritza, a member of the American Society of Civil Engineers. Regular editorial board meetings are held annually in January in Washington, D.C., United States, in conjunction with the Transportation Research Board (TRB) Annual Meeting.

== Awards and significance ==
In 2022, IJTST was selected as one of the first batch of Overseas Return Pilot Journals by the China Association for Science and Technology. In the following year, it was indexed by Ei Compendex and Emerging Sources Citation Index (ESCI) of Web of Science. In 2024 and 2025, IJTST was listed as one of the “Highest International Impact Academic Journals of China” in the Annual Report for International Citation of Chinese Academic Journals (Natural Science), compiled by the International Research Center for the Evaluation of Chinese Academic Documents and Tsinghua University Library. In 2024, the journal was selected for Phase II of the Excellence Action Plan for China’s Scientific, Technical, and Medical Journals, a program administered by the China Association for Science and Technology.

The article Assessing the impacts of deploying a shared self-driving urban mobility system: An agent-based model applied to the city of Lisbon, Portugal received a Best Paper Award from KeAi Publishing. The award was presented in November 2023 as part of KeAi’s Forum on the Developments of International STM Journals — KeAi’s Tenth Anniversary Celebration, where a hundred papers were selected based on the most cited publications of Elsevier's SciVal.

== Abstracting and indexing ==
The journal is abstracted and indexed in:

- Directory of Open Access Journals (DOAJ)
- Ei Compendex
- Emerging Sources Citation Index (ESCI)
- Scopus
- Transport Research International Documentation (TRID)
- Chinese Science Citation Database (CSCD)
- INSPEC
- Google Scholar
- International OA Journal Recommended List (OARL)

Journal metrics and rankings
Metric		Ranking	Category	Quartile
Journal Impact factor (Web of Science)	4.8	13/62	Transportation	Q1
Journal Impact factor (Web of Science)	4.8	22/77	Transportation Science & Technology	Q2
Journal Citation Indicator (Web of Science)	1.38	11/62	Transportation	Q1
Journal Citation Indicator (Web of Science)	1.38	15/77	Transportation Science & Technology	Q1
Scopus CiteScore	8.3	53/407	Civil and Structural Engineering	Q1
Scopus CiteScore	8.3	63/406	Environmental Science — Management, Monitoring, Policy and Law	Q1
Scopus CiteScore	8.3	23/133	Engineering — Automotive Engineering	Q1
Scopus CiteScore	8.3	37/152	Social Sciences — Transportation	Q1

== See also ==
- eTransportation
- Journal of Transport Geography
- Accident Analysis and Prevention
