= Cambridge Systematics =

American transportation consultancy firm

Cambridge Systematics, Inc.
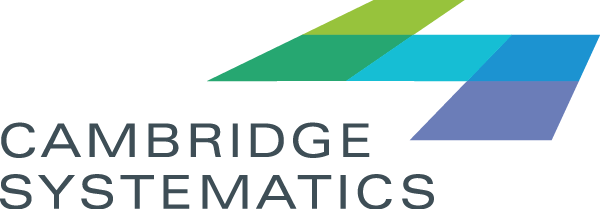
- Type: Independent
- Founded: September 27, 1972
- Headquarters: Medford, Massachusetts
- Area served: United States
- Services: Policy, Strategic Planning, & Management; Economic Analysis; Environment and Transportation; Freight Systems & Intermodal Planning; Transit & Shared Mobility; Rail Planning; Travel Demand Forecasting & modeling; Operations & Simulation; Performance Management; Transportation Safety; Software & Information Technology Consulting; GIS & Data Management
- Number of employees: ~225 (2021)
- Website: www.camsys.com

Cambridge Systematics, Inc. is an independent, employee-owned transportation consultancy with corporate headquarters in Medford, Massachusetts. The firm provides strategic planning, management services, objective analysis, and technology applications for passenger, commercial, freight, and transit systems to both public and private sectors, nationally and internationally.

Cambridge Systematics offers services in public transportation, urban design, climate change, environmental impact assessment, sustainability, sustainable transport, land-use planning, forecasting, modeling, asset management, public–private partnership, infrastructure, and logistics.

The firm's staff members are associated with the Transportation Research Board, American Planning Association, ITS America, the Governors Highway Safety Association, the American Society of Civil Engineers, and the Institute of Transportation Engineers.

== Company history ==
The company was founded on September 27, 1972, by four Massachusetts Institute of Technology (MIT) professors and a colleague who were leaders in systems analysis and disaggregate transportation models. The firm was established in Cambridge, Massachusetts, under a charter dedicated to “the application of systematic analysis to problems of transportation, the environment, urban development, and regional planning.”

The founding President, William Jessiman, had developed travel demand models and previously led the Boston office of Peat Marwick. The founding vice president, Wayne Pecknold, was an MIT faculty member alongside co-founders Marvin Manheim, Paul Roberts, and A. Sheffer Lang. Manheim had directed the Transportation & Community Values project at MIT and later founded the World Conference on Transport Research Society (WCTRS). Roberts was founding director of the MIT Center for Transportation Studies.

Several figures joined the firm over the following years. In 1973, Moshe Ben-Akiva of MIT joined and pioneered disaggregate travel demand methods. In 1976, Daniel McFadden established the California office and was later awarded the Nobel Prize for his work on discrete choice modeling. In 1977, Andrew Daly started the Netherlands office, where he pioneered disaggregate tour-based travel demand models – an early form of activity-based modeling. Cambridge Systematics was widely recognized for developing the first application of disaggregate travel demand modeling for a metropolitan area, implemented for the Metropolitan Transportation Commission (San Francisco Bay Area) in 1978.

The Europe office was subsequently spun off, and in 1994, the California office moved from Berkeley to its current location in Oakland. Since then, the company has relocated its corporate headquarters to Medford, Massachusetts, and opened additional offices in Washington, D.C., Chicago, Atlanta, Denver, Los Angeles, and Raleigh, North Carolina, as well as multiple locations in Florida and Texas. Cambridge Systematics staff members also provide onsite client support at the offices of the Federal Highway Administration and the Volpe National Transportation Systems Center.

== Services ==
- Policy, Strategic Planning, & Management
- Economic Analysis
- Environment and Transportation
- Freight Systems & Intermodal Planning
- Transit & Shared Mobility
- Rail Planning
- Travel Demand Forecasting
- Mobility Analytics
- Operations & Simulation
- Performance Management
- Transportation safety
- Software & Information Technology Consulting
- GIS & Data Management
