= TRIS online =

Bibliographic database concerned with transportation in USA

The Transportation Research Information Services online (Tris online) was a bibliographic database funded by sponsors of the United States Transportation Research Board (TRB), primarily the USA state departments of transportation and selected US federal transportation agencies. TRIS Online was hosted by the National Transportation Library under a cooperative agreement between the Bureau of Transportation Statistics and TRB. TRIS provided access to over 300,000 bibliographic records covering transportation research published in books, journal articles, technical reports and the media.

== Update January 2011 ==
The TRIS Database returned to TRB in 2010; in 2011 the TRIS Database was integrated with other international transportation literature databases (such as the ITRD Database).

== Update July 2020 ==
More information about the integrated database and access to it is available at the TRID Transportation Research Database article.
