= Ashish Sen =

Indian-American statistician

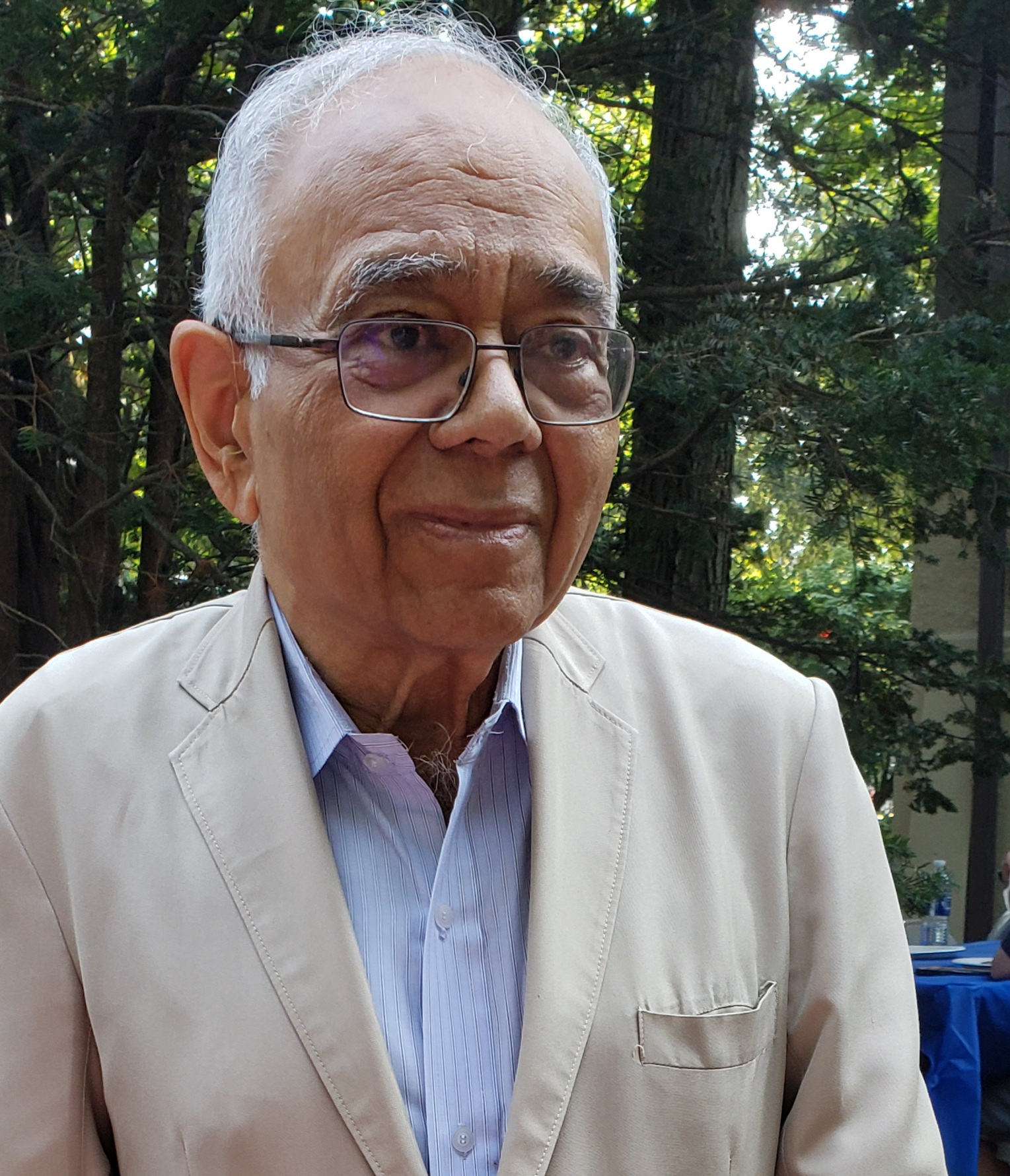
- Born: 1942 (age 83–84); New Delhi
- Education: University of Toronto PhD
- Known for: '

Ashish Sen

2nd Director of the Bureau of Transportation Statistics
- In office 1998–2002
- President: Bill Clinton; George W. Bush
- Preceded by: T. R. Lakshmanan
- Succeeded by: Rick Kowalewski

Ashish Sen is an Indian-American academic, transportation statistician, and a former director of the Bureau of Transportation Statistics at the United States Department of Transportation.

== Early life and education ==
Sen was born in Delhi in 1942. His father Ashoka Sen was in broadcasting and retired as Director General of broadcasting in India. His mother, Arati Sen, was an eminent writer and columnist. His grandfather Nishikanta Sen collaborated with C.F. Andrews in translating some of Rabindranath Tagore's work into English. Sen was raised in Dacca, New Delhi and Calcutta. He went to Loretto House, St. Columba's School, and St. Xavier's College and later completed his bachelor's degree in mathematics from the University of Calcutta. After that, he went to Canada and earned his doctorate in 1971 from the University of Toronto.

At the University of Toronto he was Don at Victoria College and Devonshire House. He was a member of the Student Council and served on the editorial board of the university newspaper The Varsity and the university debating team. He produced several plays at the Hart House Theatre. He was also deeply involved in the Toronto Teach-Ins.

== Career ==
In 1967 Sen came to the U.S. to work at Northwestern University with appointments in the Geography and Civil Engineering Departments and the Transportation Center. From 1969 through 1998, Sen worked as a professor and as an administrator at the University of Illinois at Chicago Circle and its successor institution, the University of Illinois at Chicago (UIC). Besides teaching, Sen served, at certain times, as Acting Dean and as Director of the College of Urban Sciences and later as Director of the School of Urban Planning.

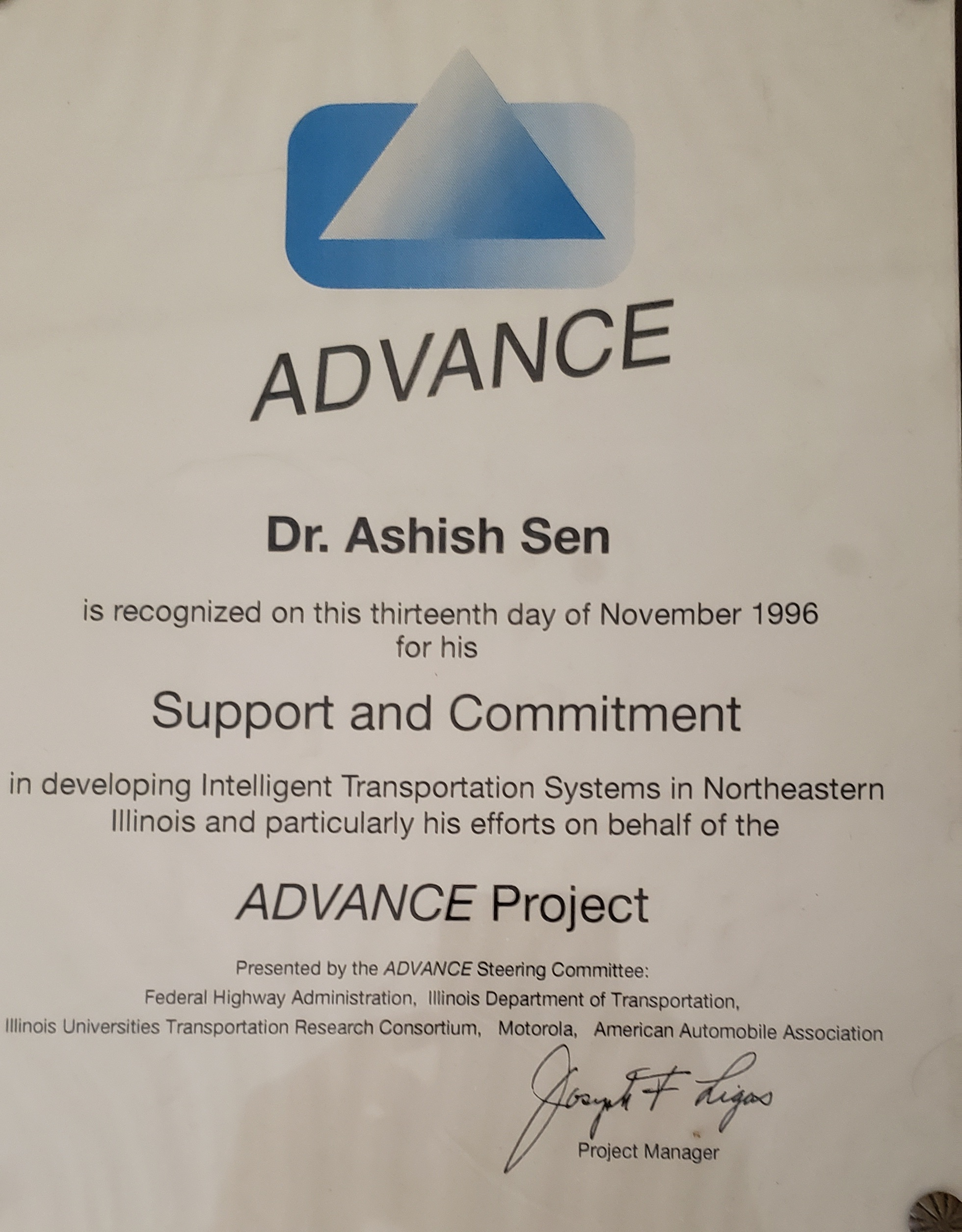
Award given for Advance Project by U.S. Federal Highway Administration

While at UIC, he wrote the proposal which resulted in the creation of the Urban Transportation Center. Sen became its director in 1996. He published extensively in statistics, transportation, urban planning, mathematics and geography journals and coauthored several widely circulated reports, including planning manuals for paratransit and transit. He also wrote two books: Regression Analysis: Theory, Methods and Applications (with M.S. Srivastava) and Gravity Models of Spatial Interaction Behavior (with Tony E. Smith). In the late 1980s, Sen worked on the ADVANCE project, a major research project on car navigation systems.

In 1980, Sen went on leave from UIC to work for the Government of India Planning Commission under the leadership of Manmohan Singh. In 1990, Sen was appointed to the Chicago Board of Education, where he chaired the Real Estate and Budget/Finance Committees.

In 1998, Sen was nominated by President Bill Clinton and confirmed by the U.S. Senate as Director of the Bureau of Transportation Statistics (BTS) in the Department of Transportation. The responsibility of the Bureau was to collect and analyze data related to transportation to help improve the national transportation system. Projects he initiated won the prestigious Computerworld/Sun Microsystems iForce Award for the best e-Business solution. Under him BTS's work on performance measurement of transportation under the Government Performance Reporting Act (GPRA) was judged appropriate for 'all of government to emulate' by the Mercatus Center, which evaluates GRA efforts of Federal departments and agencies.

During his time at BTS he served on the executive committee of the Transportation Research Board and was one of the lead authors of Changing Face of Transportation, the Clinton Administration's transportation legacy document, which reviewed the last 25 years of transportation and speculated on the next 25. He chaired the DOT-NASA Committee on Remote Sensing.

Sen is active in the political activities of the Asian diaspora in America. He was on the Founding Board of the Indo-American Center and the Asian American Institute. In 2010 he was elected president of the Indo American Democratic Organization and in 2013 he was elected the President of South-East Asia Center.

In 2012, Governor Pat Quinn appointed Sen to the Chicago Transit Authority's board and the following year appointed him to Northeastern Illinois Public Transit Task Force, created to recommend overhauling the entire region's transit system. In 2015, board members of Chicago Transit Authority elected Sen as vice chairman.

Sen was a Senior Fellow at the National Institute of Statistics Sciences and is a Fellow of the American Statistical Association and the Royal Statistical Society.

== Personal life ==
Sen is married to Colleen Taylor Sen, an author, and lives in Chicago.

== Bibliography ==
- Regression Analysis: Theory, Methods and Applications, co-authored with Muni Srivastava.
- Gravity Models of Spatial Interaction Behavior, co-authored with Tony E. Smith.
