= Sharon Banks =

Sharon D. Banks was the first African-American women to head the San Francisco East Bay's Alameda-Contra Costa Transit District, known as "AC Transit". She made California her home after completing her law degree in San Francisco. Banks was revered as a national public transit leader. She was committed to sustainable transportation which positioned AC Transit as a industry leader in environmental stewardship. In 1998, Banks was named chairwoman of the National Academy of Sciences' Transportation Research Board.

== Early life and education ==
Born and raised in Cairo, Illinois, she first earned a B.S. in Speech Pathology and Audiology from Southern Illinois University and a master's degree in Education from California State University Hayward before pursuing a law degree from Hastings College of the Law in San Francisco.

== Legal career ==
Banks served as an attorney in the Oakland Unified School District's legal advisor's office. She then became deputy city attorney of Oakland from 1983 to 1987.

== Transit career ==
Banks joined AC Transit in March 1990 as general counsel and stepped in as interim chief by the end of 1990. In May 1991, she was named General Manager and oversaw 2,100 transit workers who serviced 230,000 Bay Area bus riders a day. At the time, the AC Transit budget was $186 million.

In her transit career, Banks was known best for her empowerment leadership style and for "introducing environmentally friendly buses, and implementing community-focused initiatives". She held a position in the Conference of Minority Transportation Officials (COMTO).

She received numerous awards in her role as a public transit leader. She won the American Public Transit Association "Civil Rights Leadership Award". She was also awarded the "Special Transportation Employee Award" by the Metropolitan Transportation Commission.

In 1998, Banks was named chairwoman of the National Academy of Sciences' Transportation Research Board. Before taking on this role, she had chaired the California Transit Association representing for transit operations across the state.

== Death and legacy ==
Banks died in 1999 at 53 years old while AC Transit's General Manager.

Banks was recognized for her personalized leadership style, as observed by the Deputy General Manager, Jim Gleich, who said at her wake that "one of her unique strengths was that she had a personal connection with every one of us who are employees here."

The Transportation Safety Board named a recurring award for Banks. They give the Sharon Banks Award for Humanitarian Leadership in Transportation every two years to someone who makes "a significant difference in the lives of those who use, deliver, or support transportation services" and who has the "caring nature and depth of character" exemplified by Banks
