= Mudan Evening Post =

Chinese newspaper

- Native name: 牡丹晚报
- Type: Daily newspaper
- Publisher: Heze Daily Agency
- Founded: January 1995
- Language: Chinese
- Headquarters: Heze, Shandong
- Website: Mudan Evening Post

Mudan Evening Post (Chinese: 牡丹晚报), also known as Peony Evening News or Mudan Evening Daily News Paper, is a comprehensive evening newspaper published in simplified Chinese in the People's Republic of China. The newspaper is a Heze-based lifestyle newspaper, sponsored and supervised by the Heze Daily Agency.

In January 1995, based on the original Caozhou Evening Post (曹州晚报), the Caozhou Daily Agency (曹州日报社) founded the Mudan Evening Post, which was published under the original CN Serial Number of the Caozhou Evening Post.
