= National Transportation Library =

U.S. national library

Coordinates: 38.8757°N 77.0037°W

- Seal of the Department of Transportation

Agency overview
- Formed: 1998
- Jurisdiction: Federal government of the United States
- Headquarters: 1200 New Jersey Avenue SE, Washington, D.C.
- Parent agency: Bureau of Transportation Statistics
- Key document: Transportation Equity Act for the 21st Century (TEA-21)
- Website: ntl.bts.gov

The National Transportation Library (NTL) maintains and facilitates access to information necessary for transportation decision-making in government and coordinates with public and private transportation libraries and information providers to improve information sharing among the transportation community. It is currently under the administration of the Bureau of Transportation Statistics (BTS).

== History ==
NTL was created under the Transportation Equity Act for the 21st Century (TEA-21) in 1998. From 2008-2015, the director of NTL also served as director of the US Department of Transportation Library.

In 2012 NTL's authorized role was expanded by Moving Ahead for Progress in the 21st Century Act (MAP-21) to include the acquisition, preservation, and management of transportation information; as well as expanded services provided to the USDOT, other Federal agencies, transportation professionals, and the public.

In response to the 2013 Office of Science and Technology Policy (OSTP) Memorandum for the Heads of Executive Departments and Agencies entitled "Increasing Access to the Results of Federally Funded Scientific Research", the USDOT created a Public Access Plan to ensure access to publications and datasets created through USDOT research and development. The OSTP Memorandum "hereby directs each Federal agency with over $100 million in annual conduct of research and development expenditures to develop a plan to support increased public access to the results of research funded by the Federal Government."

== Services ==
=== ROSA P ===
The Repository & Open Science Access Portal, known as ROSA P, is the NTL digital repository and is the full-text archive for the transportation research community. ROSA P contains resources from the USDOT, state DOTs, and transportation organizations. Resources available in ROSA P include full-text electronic publications, datasets, images, videos, and maps. ROSA P also includes Collections of shared topics:

- BTS Data Dictionary
- Intelligent Transportation Systems Joints Program Office Electronic Library
- Federal Transit Administration - 50th Anniversary Document Collection
- NHTSA - Behavioral Safety Research
- US Transportation Collection
- Volpe National Transportation Systems Center, Technical Reference Center
- Federal Highway Administration Research Library
- Federal Motor Carrier Safety Administration

All of these resources are free to access, are in the public domain, and/or include permissions from the rights holder to NTL.

=== References ===
The NTL reference staff provides services within the USDOT, to Congress, and to the public via Ask-A-Librarian. Reference is provided for all modes of transportation and statistical products. The reference staff also maintain FAQs on a variety of subjects.

=== Freight Data Dictionary ===
The Freight Data Dictionary (FDD) contains over 6,300 data elements and 13,000 glossary terms compiled from multiple freight data sources. The FDD is useful for identifying and harmonizing differences in data element definitions, improving production with precision.

=== Transportation Librarians Roundtable ===
The Transportation Librarians Roundtable (TLR) is a month web conference series and is a partnerships between NTL, the American Association of State Highway and Transportation Officials (AASHTO), the Transportation Research Board (TRB), and the Special Libraries Association - Transportation Division.

=== National Transportation Knowledge Network ===
National Transportation Knowledge Networks (TKNs) have been established in three geographic regions: east, midwest, and west. These TKNs pool expertise and knowledge sharing while leveraging resources through lending agreements and coordinated acquisitions or resources. NTL acts as a sponsor and national representative for the TKNs.
