= State Security Bulletin =

State Security Bulletin 国家安全通讯
- Cover of the February 2003 issue of State Security Bulletin.
- Discipline: Intelligence, national security
- Language: Chinese
- Edited by: Wang Hailiang

Publication details
- History: 1985–present
- Publisher: Ministry of State Security (China)
- Frequency: Monthly

Links
- CNKI

State Security Bulletin (Chinese: 国家安全通讯; pinyin: Guójiā Ānquán Tōngxùn) is a monthly peer-reviewed academic journal covering intelligence, published by China's Ministry of State Security (MSS). It is comparable in scope to Studies in Intelligence, a quarterly journal published by the U.S. Central Intelligence Agency. Published since 1985, it is edited by Wang Hailiang (王海亮). The journal's stated purpose is "to strengthen the national security awareness of the broad masses of cadres and the masses, establish and consolidate the people's defense line against treachery and anti-dispersion, and provide a good public opinion and working environment for national security work."

The journal's CN Serial Number is 11-2348/D.

== History ==
According to the CIA, the State Security Bulletin emerged from the belief by early leaders of the then-new MSS that "a public intelligence history and associated discussion of intelligence and security issues would help raise awareness of espionage and subversion threats to the PRC and provide a sympathetic operational environment for those professionally responsible for countering them." The journal is open to submissions by any Chinese citizen with academic credentials, but it requires prospective authors to specify their ethnicity if anything other than Han Chinese.
