= Colleen Taylor Sen =

Canadian author

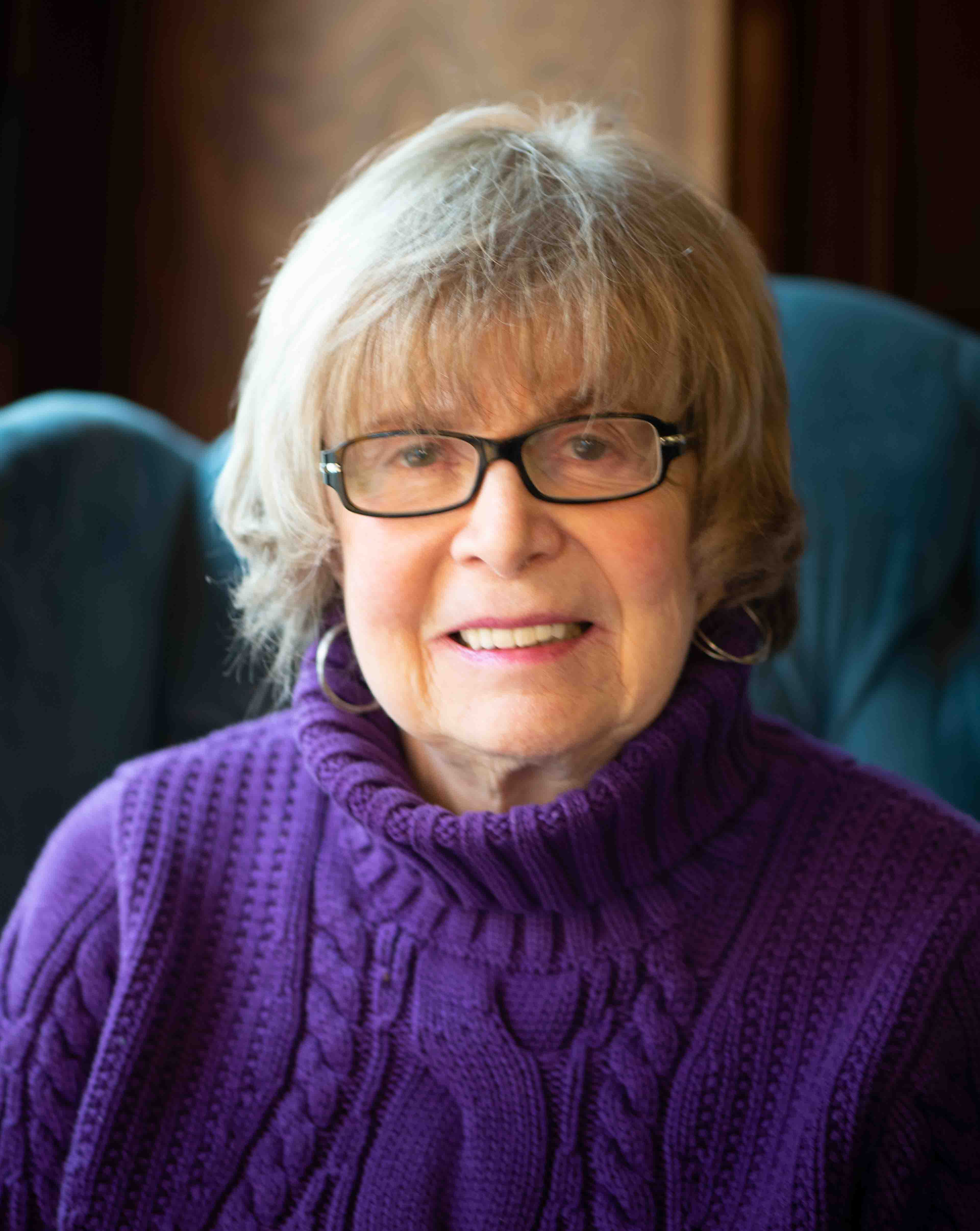
- Born: Toronto
- Education: University of Toronto; Columbia University
- Spouse: Ashish Sen
- Website: colleensen.net

Colleen Taylor Sen is a Canadian–American translator and author specializing in Indian cuisine. She has written or co-edited eight books and many articles and has also contributed entries to encyclopedias. Sen has given lectures at DePaul University, Indiana University, the Smithsonian Institution, The Oxford Food Symposia, K.R. Cama Oriental Institute (Mumbai), The National Council for Hotel Management and Catering Technology (New Delhi), The Indian International Centre (New Delhi), The Institute of Hotel Management (New Delhi), and other institutions.

== Early life ==
Sen was born in Toronto. She holds a B.A. and M.A. in Slavic Studies from the University of Toronto and a PhD in Slavic Languages from Columbia University. After completing her PhD, she participated in chess competitions, analyzed chess games for Channel 11, and was profiled in the Sun Times for her skills in playing chess.

== Career ==
In 1973–74 Sen taught Slavic languages at Roosevelt University, Chicago. She joined the Gas Technology Institute in 1975 and until retiring in 2013 held various positions in policy, external relations, and education. In 1990 she launched The LNG Observer, the world's first publication devoted to liquefied natural gas. She was editor (with Bob Nimocks) of The World LNG Source Book: An Encyclopedia of the Global LNG Industry.

From 1995 to 2010, she served as a member of the Steering Committee of the International Conferences on Liquefied Natural Gas.

=== Food author ===
Starting in the early 1970s, Sen contributed free-lance articles to such publications as Travel and Leisure, Food Arts, the Chicago Sun Times, the Chicago Tribune, The Christian Science Monitor, and The Globe and Mail. From 1996 to 2014 she was a regular participant in the Oxford Symposia on Food and Cookery.

Her first book, Food Culture in India, was published in 2004 followed by her next book Curry: A Global History. At the suggestion of a local restaurateur, she wrote Pakoras, Paneer, Pappadums: A Guide to Indian Restaurant Menus which was published in 2010.

In 2013, she and Bruce Kraig were coeditors of Street Food around the World: An Encyclopedia of Food and Culture, later republished as Street Food: Everything You Wanted to Know About Open Air Stands, Carts and Food Trucks Around the World The next year she teamed with Helen Saberi to write Turmeric: The Wonder Spice. In 2017 she coedited The Chicago Food Encyclopedia with Bruce Kraig and Carol Haddix.

Sen's Feasts and Fasts: A History of Food in India was published in England in 2015 and in India in 2016. Chicago Tribune called the book, "a richly detailed volume" and The Independent wrote that the book is "an ambitious tome which explores India's various dietary conventions and religions through the ages." Vir Sanghvi called Feasts and Fasts "a fascinating book because it overturns many of the layperson's most commonly held beliefs about Indian food". In December, Vogue included the book in its list of 16 best cookbooks of 2015 and wrote that it is "an irresistible edition to your kitchen shelf, the history inside is richer than any Indian dish you've ever tasted." Smithsonian Magazine selected Feasts and Fasts as one of the best books about food in 2016.

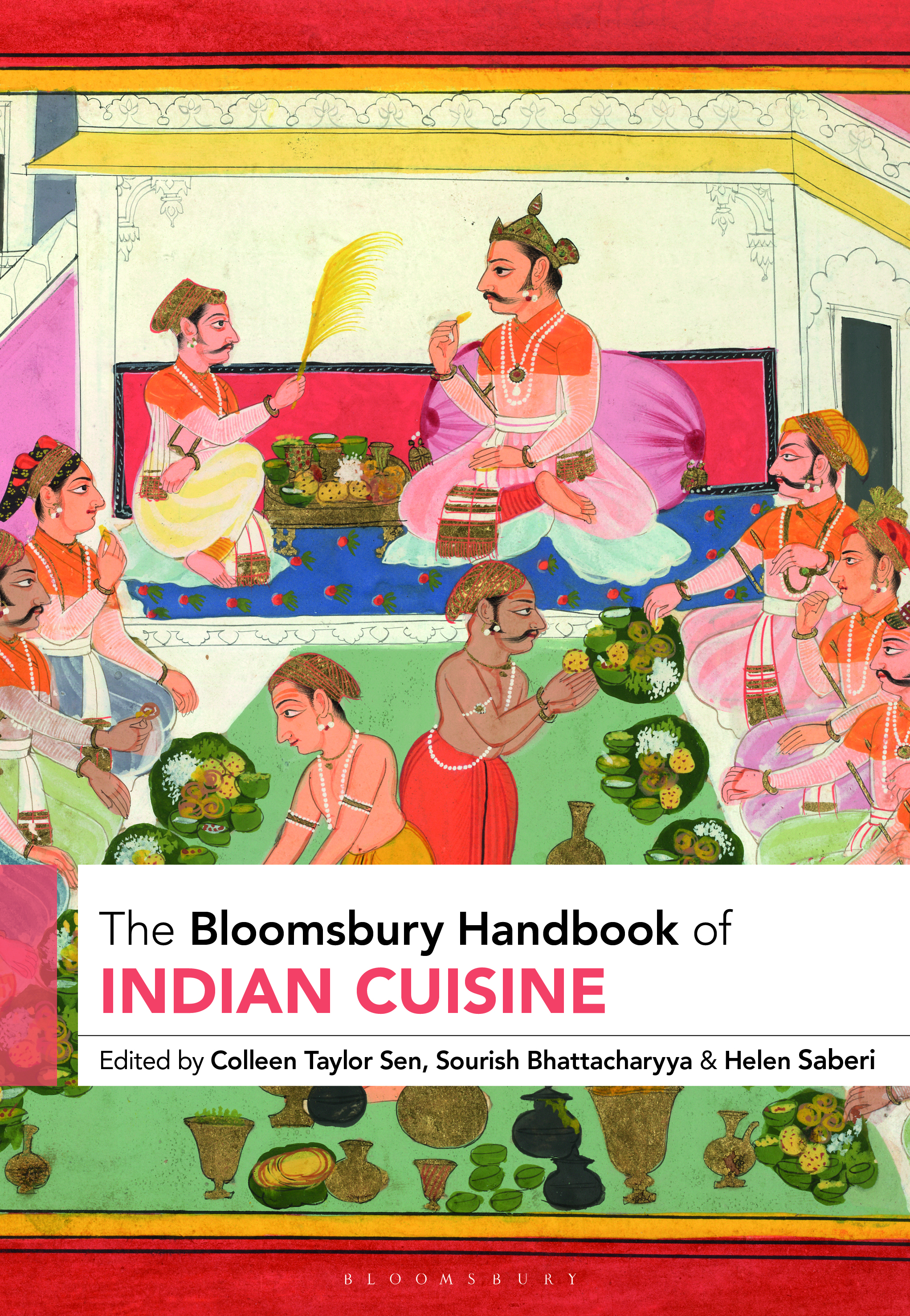
Cover of Handbook of Indian Cuisine, 2023

Ashoka and the Maurya Dynasty: The History and Legacy of Ancient India's Greatest Dynasty was published in October 2022. March 2023 saw the publication of The Bloomsbury Handbook of Indian Cuisine, coedited by Sourish Bhattacharyya and Helen Saberi, with entries by over 25 leading food historians and journalists.

Her books have been translated into Arabic, Japanese, Korean, and Chinese. She has also organized many culinary tours of Indian stores and has given talks and cooking demonstrations on Indian cuisine. Her website is www.colleensen.net.

== Awards and Associations ==
- Order des Palmes Academiques (Officier) awarded by the French Government
- Member of Board of Chicago Chapter of American Institute of Wine and Food 1995-2000; co-chair, Programming, 1997-1999
- Canadian Club of Chicago (president,1975–76) Les Dames d'Escoffier, Chicago Chapter
- Society of Midwest Authors

== Personal life ==
She is married to Ashish Sen, a professor and transportation statistician.

== Bibliography ==
=== Selected translations ===
- Let History Judge (Knopf, 1972)
- The National Question: Selected Writings of Rosa Luxemburg (Monthly Review Press, 1976)

=== Books ===
- Food Culture in India (Greenwood, 2006)
- Curry: A Global History (Reaktion, 2009)
- Pakoras, Paneer, Pappadums: A Guide to North American Indian Restaurants (Self-Published, 2010).
- Street Food around the World: An Encyclopaedia of Food and Culture (with Bruce Kraig), (ABC Clio, 2013). Republished as Street Food: Everything You Wanted to Know About Open Air Stands, Carts and Food Trucks Around the World (Agate, 2017)
- Turmeric: The Wonder Spice (with Helen Saberi) (Agate, 2014)
- Feasts and Fasts: A History of Food in India (Reaktion, 2015) (New Delhi: Speaking Tiger, 2016)
- The Indian Restaurant Menu Decoded (2014)
- The Chicago Food Encyclopedia (with Bruce Kraig and Carol Haddix) (University of Illinois Press, 2017)
- Ashoka and the Maurya Dynasty: The History and Legacy of Ancient India's Greatest Dynasty (Reaktion, 2022)
- The Bloomsbury Handbook of Indian Cuisine (with Sourish Bhattacharyya and Helen Saberi) (Bloomsbury Academic, 2023)
