= National Cooperative Highway Research Program =

- Founder: Transportation Research Board
- Established: 1962
- Focus: transportation research
- Head: Waseem Dekelbab
- Budget: $46 million (2023)
- Location: Washington, D.C., United States
- Website: www.trb.org/NCHRP

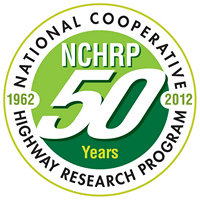
NCHRP 50th Anniversary Logo

The National Cooperative Highway Research Program (NCHRP) conducts research in problem areas that affect highway planning, design, construction, operation, and maintenance in the United States. They are an applied research program administered by the Transportation Research Board (TRB), part of the National Academies of Sciences Engineering and Medicine (NASEM), it is jointly supported by federal agencies, state departments of transportation (DOTs), and other nonprofit organizations.

== Funding ==
The National Cooperative Highway Research Program was established in 1962 under the Transportation Research Board. Governments needed to tackle what Rex M. Whitton termed "clearly a supreme challenge to research": moving people and goods in cities by using a fixed percentage of highway funding dedicated to research. Whitton envisioned that this research would encompass studies of human behavior, land use, employment, and new technologies. Another anecdote contributing to NCHRP's founding comes from the late 1950s, when it was noted that 32 state DOTs were researching the same topic without any knowledge of each other's work. This revelation provided incentive for the states to pool their resources on a national research program addressing common problems. The extent of duplicative and isolated research was mentioned in a conversation between Edward Holmes of the Bureau of Public Roads (BPR) and Alfred E. Johnson, the American Association of State Highway Officials (AASHO) executive director at the time.

It is sponsored by American Association of State Highway and Transportation Officials (AASHTO) and the U.S. Department of Transportation's Federal Highway Administration (FHWA). This program is funded by all the state highway and transportation departments. State departments of transportation are requested to contribute 5.5% of their State Planning and Research (SP&R) funds each year. Annual NCHRP funding has been approximately $37 million in recent years.

FHWA provides the funds to the NCHRP through a cooperative agreement with the National Academy of Sciences, the parent organization of the Transportation Research Board.

== Examples ==
=== Projects ===
Examples of research projects previously approved by NCHRP include:

- Barth, Matthew J.; et al. (2000). Development of a Comprehensive Modal Emissions Model (PDF) (Report). Transportation Research Board. NCHRP Project 25-11; Web-Only Document 122.
- Little, Dallas N.; Amit Bhasin; et al. (2006). Using Surface Energy Measurements to Select Materials for Asphalt Pavement (PDF) (Report). Transportation Research Board. NCHRP Project 9-37; Web-Only Document 104.
- Krenzke, Tom; et al. (2011). Producing Transportation Data Products from the American Community Survey That Comply With Disclosure Rules (PDF) (Report). Transportation Research Board. NCHRP Project 08-79; Web-Only Document 180.

=== Reports ===
Examples of NCHRP reports include:

- Isaac Shafran; Anne Strauss-Weider (2003). Financing and Improving Land Access to U.S. Intermodal Cargo Hubs (PDF) (Report). Transportation Research Board. NCHRP Report 497.
- Ralph D. Ellis Jr.; Scott Amos; Ashish Kumar (2003). Illumination Guidelines for Nighttime Highway Work (PDF) (Report). Transportation Research Board. NCHRP Report 498.
