= World Area Codes =

Codes used by Bureau of Transportation Statistics

The Bureau of Transportation Statistics (BTS), as part of the United States Department of Transportation (US DOT), maintains a list of U.S. state and country codes, named World Area Codes (WAC).

== (U.S.) State and (world) country codes ==
World Area Code (WAC)	WAC Sequence ID2	WAC Name	World area name	Country short name	Country type	Capital	Sovereignty	Country ISO code	State code	FIPS code	Start date	End date	Comments	Is active
1	101	Alaska	United States (Includes territories and possessions)	United States	Independent State in the World	Washington, DC		US	AK	02	1950-01-01		An organized territory on May 11, 1912 and the 49th state of the U.S. on January 3, 1959.	1
2	201	Hawaii	United States (Includes territories and possessions)	United States	Independent State in the World	Washington, DC		US	HI	15	1950-01-01		When it was annexed by the United States, becoming a territory in 1900, and a state in 1959.	1
3	301	Puerto Rico	United States (Includes territories and possessions)	United States	Independent State in the World	Washington, DC		US	PR	72	1990-01-01			1
4	401	U.S. Virgin Islands	United States (Includes territories and possessions)	United States	Independent State in the World	Washington, DC		US	VI	78	1990-01-01		The U.S. took possession of the islands on March 31, 1917 and the territory was renamed the Virgin Islands of the United States	1
5	501	U.S. Pacific Trust Territories and Possessions	United States (Includes territories and possessions)	United States	Independent State in the World	Washington, DC		US	TT	75	1990-01-01		WAC 005 Includes: Guam, Johnston Island, Commonwealth of Northern Mariana Islands, Midway Islands, and Wake Island. Palau was formerly part of the US Pacific Trust and Possessions. When Palau gained independence in October 1994, it was assigned WAC 854.	1
11	1101	Connecticut	United States (Includes territories and possessions)	United States	Independent State in the World	Washington, DC		US	CT	09	1950-01-01			1
12	1201	Maine	United States (Includes territories and possessions)	United States	Independent State in the World	Washington, DC		US	ME	23	1950-01-01			1
13	1301	Massachusetts	United States (Includes territories and possessions)	United States	Independent State in the World	Washington, DC		US	MA	25	1950-01-01			1
14	1401	New Hampshire	United States (Includes territories and possessions)	United States	Independent State in the World	Washington, DC		US	NH	33	1950-01-01			1
15	1501	Rhode Island	United States (Includes territories and possessions)	United States	Independent State in the World	Washington, DC		US	RI	44	1950-01-01			1
16	1601	Vermont	United States (Includes territories and possessions)	United States	Independent State in the World	Washington, DC		US	VT	50	1950-01-01			1
21	2101	New Jersey	United States (Includes territories and possessions)	United States	Independent State in the World	Washington, DC		US	NJ	34	1950-01-01			1
22	2201	New York	United States (Includes territories and possessions)	United States	Independent State in the World	Washington, DC		US	NY	36	1950-01-01			1
23	2301	Pennsylvania	United States (Includes territories and possessions)	United States	Independent State in the World	Washington, DC		US	PA	42	1950-01-01			1
31	3101	Delaware	United States (Includes territories and possessions)	United States	Independent State in the World	Washington, DC		US	DE	10	1950-01-01			1
32	3201	District of Columbia	United States (Includes territories and possessions)	United States	Independent State in the World	Washington, DC		US	DC	11	1950-01-01			1
33	3301	Florida	United States (Includes territories and possessions)	United States	Independent State in the World	Washington, DC		US	FL	12	1950-01-01			1
34	3401	Georgia	United States (Includes territories and possessions)	United States	Independent State in the World	Washington, DC		US	GA	13	1950-01-01			1
35	3501	Maryland	United States (Includes territories and possessions)	United States	Independent State in the World	Washington, DC		US	MD	24	1950-01-01			1
36	3601	North Carolina	United States (Includes territories and possessions)	United States	Independent State in the World	Washington, DC		US	NC	37	1950-01-01			1
37	3701	South Carolina	United States (Includes territories and possessions)	United States	Independent State in the World	Washington, DC		US	SC	45	1950-01-01			1
38	3801	Virginia	United States (Includes territories and possessions)	United States	Independent State in the World	Washington, DC		US	VA	51	1950-01-01			1
39	3901	West Virginia	United States (Includes territories and possessions)	United States	Independent State in the World	Washington, DC		US	WV	54	1950-01-01			1
41	4101	Illinois	United States (Includes territories and possessions)	United States	Independent State in the World	Washington, DC		US	IL	17	1950-01-01			1
42	4201	Indiana	United States (Includes territories and possessions)	United States	Independent State in the World	Washington, DC		US	IN	18	1950-01-01			1
43	4301	Michigan	United States (Includes territories and possessions)	United States	Independent State in the World	Washington, DC		US	MI	26	1950-01-01			1
44	4401	Ohio	United States (Includes territories and possessions)	United States	Independent State in the World	Washington, DC		US	OH	39	1950-01-01			1
45	4501	Wisconsin	United States (Includes territories and possessions)	United States	Independent State in the World	Washington, DC		US	WI	55	1950-01-01			1
51	5101	Alabama	United States (Includes territories and possessions)	United States	Independent State in the World	Washington, DC		US	AL	01	1950-01-01			1
52	5201	Kentucky	United States (Includes territories and possessions)	United States	Independent State in the World	Washington, DC		US	KY	21	1950-01-01			1
53	5301	Mississippi	United States (Includes territories and possessions)	United States	Independent State in the World	Washington, DC		US	MS	28	1950-01-01			1
54	5401	Tennessee	United States (Includes territories and possessions)	United States	Independent State in the World	Washington, DC		US	TN	47	1950-01-01			1
61	6101	Iowa	United States (Includes territories and possessions)	United States	Independent State in the World	Washington, DC		US	IA	19	1950-01-01			1
62	6201	Kansas	United States (Includes territories and possessions)	United States	Independent State in the World	Washington, DC		US	KS	20	1950-01-01			1
63	6301	Minnesota	United States (Includes territories and possessions)	United States	Independent State in the World	Washington, DC		US	MN	27	1950-01-01			1
64	6401	Missouri	United States (Includes territories and possessions)	United States	Independent State in the World	Washington, DC		US	MO	29	1950-01-01			1
65	6501	Nebraska	United States (Includes territories and possessions)	United States	Independent State in the World	Washington, DC		US	NE	31	1950-01-01			1
66	6601	North Dakota	United States (Includes territories and possessions)	United States	Independent State in the World	Washington, DC		US	ND	38	1950-01-01			1
67	6701	South Dakota	United States (Includes territories and possessions)	United States	Independent State in the World	Washington, DC		US	SD	46	1950-01-01			1
71	7101	Arkansas	United States (Includes territories and possessions)	United States	Independent State in the World	Washington, DC		US	AR	05	1950-01-01			1
72	7201	Louisiana	United States (Includes territories and possessions)	United States	Independent State in the World	Washington, DC		US	LA	22	1950-01-01			1
73	7301	Oklahoma	United States (Includes territories and possessions)	United States	Independent State in the World	Washington, DC		US	OK	40	1950-01-01			1
74	7401	Texas	United States (Includes territories and possessions)	United States	Independent State in the World	Washington, DC		US	TX	48	1950-01-01			1
81	8101	Arizona	United States (Includes territories and possessions)	United States	Independent State in the World	Washington, DC		US	AZ	04	1950-01-01			1
82	8201	Colorado	United States (Includes territories and possessions)	United States	Independent State in the World	Washington, DC		US	CO	08	1950-01-01			1
83	8301	Idaho	United States (Includes territories and possessions)	United States	Independent State in the World	Washington, DC		US	ID	16	1950-01-01			1
84	8401	Montana	United States (Includes territories and possessions)	United States	Independent State in the World	Washington, DC		US	MT	30	1950-01-01			1
85	8501	Nevada	United States (Includes territories and possessions)	United States	Independent State in the World	Washington, DC		US	NV	32	1950-01-01			1
86	8601	New Mexico	United States (Includes territories and possessions)	United States	Independent State in the World	Washington, DC		US	NM	35	1950-01-01			1
87	8701	Utah	United States (Includes territories and possessions)	United States	Independent State in the World	Washington, DC		US	UT	49	1950-01-01			1
88	8801	Wyoming	United States (Includes territories and possessions)	United States	Independent State in the World	Washington, DC		US	WY	56	1950-01-01			1
91	9101	California	United States (Includes territories and possessions)	United States	Independent State in the World	Washington, DC		US	CA	06	1950-01-01			1
92	9201	Oregon	United States (Includes territories and possessions)	United States	Independent State in the World	Washington, DC		US	OR	41	1950-01-01			1
93	9301	Washington	United States (Includes territories and possessions)	United States	Independent State in the World	Washington, DC		US	WA	53	1950-01-01			1
106	10601	Belize	Middle America	British Honduras - UK	Independent State in the World	Belmopan		BZ			1950-01-01	1973-05-31	Independence: September 21, 1981. The official name of the territory was changed from British Honduras to Belize in June 1973, and full independence was granted on September 21, 1981.	0
106	10602	Belize	Middle America	Belize - UK	Independent State in the World	Belmopan		BZ			1973-06-01	1981-08-31	Independence: September 21, 1981. The official name of the territory was changed from British Honduras to Belize in June 1973, and full independence was granted on September 21, 1981.	0
106	10603	Belize	Middle America	Belize	Independent State in the World	Belmopan		BZ			1981-09-01		Independence: September 21, 1981. The official name of the territory was changed from British Honduras to Belize in June 1973, and full independence was granted on September 21, 1981.	1
110	11001	Costa Rica	Middle America	Costa Rica	Independent State in the World	San Jose		CR			1950-01-01			1
118	11801	El Salvador	Middle America	El Salvador	Independent State in the World	San Salvador		SV			1950-01-01			1
127	12701	Guatemala	Middle America	Guatemala	Independent State in the World	Guatemala		GT			1950-01-01			1
131	13101	Honduras	Middle America	Honduras	Independent State in the World	Tegucigalpa		HN			1950-01-01			1
148	14801	Mexico	Middle America	Mexico	Independent State in the World	Mexico		MX			1950-01-01			1
153	15301	Nicaragua	Middle America	Nicaragua	Independent State in the World	Managua		NI			1950-01-01			1
160	16001	Panama Canal Zone	Middle America	Panama	Independent State in the World	Panama		PA			1950-01-01	1999-12-31	The Canal Zone and its government ceased to exist when the treaties entered into force and Panama assumed jurisdiction over Canal Zone territories and functions, a process that was finalized on December 31, 1999. From 1979 to 1999 the canal itself was under joint U.S.-Panamanian control. Since 1980, it took the country code of Panama (PA). Retired. Panama Canal Zone area was returned to Panama. The area is now under WAC 162.	1
162	16201	Panama	Middle America	Panama	Independent State in the World	Panama		PA			1950-01-01			1
174	17401	San Andres Island	Middle America	Colombia	Independent State in the World	Bogota		CO			1950-01-01	1989-02-28	Retired. San Andres Island area is included under WAC 327	1
202	20201	Anguilla	Caribbean, Bahamas, and Bermuda	Anguilla	Dependency and Area of Special Sovereignty	The Valley	United Kingdom	AI			1980-01-01		Anguilla became a separate British dependency (now termed a British overseas territory) in 1980.	1
204	20401	Bahamas	Caribbean, Bahamas, and Bermuda	The Bahamas	Independent State in the World	Nassau		BS			1973-07-01		Became independent July 10, 1973	1
205	20501	Barbados	Caribbean, Bahamas, and Bermuda	Barbados	Independent State in the World	Bridgetown		BB			1966-11-01		Became independent November 30, 1966	1
206	20601	Antigua and Barbuda	Caribbean, Bahamas, and Bermuda	Antigua and Barbuda	Independent State in the World	Saint John's		AG			1981-11-01		The islands became an independent state within the British Commonwealth of Nations in 1981. Independence: November 1, 1981.	1
207	20701	Bermuda	Caribbean, Bahamas, and Bermuda	Bermuda	Dependency and Area of Special Sovereignty	Hamilton	United Kingdom	BM			1950-01-01			1
209	20901	Carriacou	Caribbean, Bahamas, and Bermuda	Carriacou	Dependency and Area of Special Sovereignty	Hillsborough	United Kingdom				1950-01-01	1974-01-31	Retired. Area is now under WAC 273 that has beginning date of 2/1/1974	1
219	21901	Cuba	Caribbean, Bahamas, and Bermuda	Cuba	Independent State in the World	Havana		CU			1950-01-01			1
221	22101	Dominica	Caribbean, Bahamas, and Bermuda	Dominica	Independent State in the World	Roseau		DM			1978-11-01		On November 3, 1978, the Commonwealth of Dominica was granted independence by the United Kingdom	1
224	22401	Dominican Republic	Caribbean, Bahamas, and Bermuda	Dominican Republic	Independent State in the World	Santo Domingo		DO			1950-01-01			1
233	23301	Cayman Islands	Caribbean, Bahamas, and Bermuda	Cayman Islands	Dependency and Area of Special Sovereignty	George Town	United Kingdom	KY			1962-08-01		From 1959 to 1962 Cayman Islands were part of the Federation of West Indies. Following Jamaica's independence from Great Britain in 1962, Cayman chooses to remain a Crown Colony. Area was originally under WAC 210 (Cayman Brac), but it was removed during WAC cleanup.	1
234	23401	Grand Turk	Caribbean, Bahamas, and Bermuda	Turks and Caicos Islands	Dependency and Area of Special Sovereignty	Grand Turk	United Kingdom	TC			1950-01-01	1984-12-31	Retired. Area is now under WAC 281	1
235	23501	Guadeloupe	Caribbean, Bahamas, and Bermuda	Guadeloupe	Dependency and Area of Special Sovereignty		France	GP			1950-01-01		Includes: French Antilles. French Guiana, Guadeloupe, Martinique and Reunion are departments (first-order administrative units) of France, and are therefore not dependencies or areas of special sovereignty. They are included in this list only for the convenience of the user (State department)	1
236	23601	Saint Martin	Caribbean, Bahamas, and Bermuda	Saint Martin	Dependency and Area of Special Sovereignty	Marigot	France	MF			2007-04-01		It was part of Guadeloupe (WAC 235). In 2003, the populace of the islands voted to secede from Guadeloupe and in 2007 the island became a French overseas collectivity.	1
237	23701	Saint Barthelemy	Caribbean, Bahamas, and Bermuda	Saint Barthelemy	Dependency and Area of Special Sovereignty	Gustavia	France	BL			2007-04-01		It was part of Guadeloupe (WAC 235). In 2003, the populace of the islands voted to secede from Guadeloupe and in 2007 the island became a French overseas collectivity.	1
238	23801	Haiti	Caribbean, Bahamas, and Bermuda	Haiti	Independent State in the World	Port-au-Prince		HT			1950-01-01			1
243	24301	Jamaica	Caribbean, Bahamas, and Bermuda	Jamaica	Independent State in the World	Kingston		JM			1962-08-01		Independence: August 6, 1962.	1
252	25201	Martinique	Caribbean, Bahamas, and Bermuda	Martinique	Dependency and Area of Special Sovereignty		France	MQ			1950-01-01		French Guiana, Guadeloupe, Martinique and Reunion are departments (first-order administrative units) of France, and are therefore not dependencies or areas of special sovereignty. They are included in this list only for the convenience of the user (State department)	1
256	25601	Montserrat	Caribbean, Bahamas, and Bermuda	Montserrat	Dependency and Area of Special Sovereignty	Plymouth	United Kingdom	MS			1950-01-01			1
257	25701	Mustique	Caribbean, Bahamas, and Bermuda	Saint Vincent and the Grenadines	Independent State in the World	Kingstown		VC			1979-10-01	1988-12-31	Retired. Area is now under WAC 279 (St. Vincent Grenadines Includes: Union Island, Mustique, Palm Island)	1
259	25901	Netherlands Antilles	Caribbean, Bahamas, and Bermuda	Netherlands Antilles	Dependency and Area of Special Sovereignty	Willemstad	Netherlands	AN			1950-01-01	2010-09-30	Netherlands Antilles comprises two groupings of islands: Curacao and Bonaire are located off the coast of Venezuela; Saba, Sint Eustatius, and Sint Maarten (the Dutch two-fifths of the island of Saint Martin) lie 800 km to the north.	1
260	26001	Bonaire, Sint Eustatius, and Saba	Caribbean, Bahamas, and Bermuda	Bonaire, Sint Eustatius, and Saba	Dependency and Area of Special Sovereignty	Oranjestad	Netherlands	BQ			2010-10-01		It was part of the Netherlands Antilles (WAC 259) which dissolved on October 10, 2010. It now falls under the direct administration of the Netherlands.	1
261	26101	St. Kitts and Nevis - UK	Caribbean, Bahamas, and Bermuda	Saint Kitts and Nevis - UK	Dependency and Area of Special Sovereignty	Basseterre	United Kingdom				1971-07-01	1983-08-31	Retired. Area is now under WAC 275. Anguilla broke away from this confederation in 1971 though officially in 1980.	1
262	26201	Curacao	Caribbean, Bahamas, and Bermuda	Curacao	Dependency and Area of Special Sovereignty	Willemstad	Netherlands	CW			2010-10-01		It was part of the Netherlands Antilles (WAC 259) which dissolved on October 10, 2010. It became an autonomous territory of the Kingdom of the Netherlands.	1
264	26401	Sint Maarten	Caribbean, Bahamas, and Bermuda	Sint Maarten	Dependency and Area of Special Sovereignty	Marigot	Netherlands	SX			2010-10-01		It was part of the Netherlands Antilles (WAC 259) which dissolved on October 10, 2010. It became an autonomous territory of the Kingdom of the Netherlands.	1
267	26701	Providenciales	Caribbean, Bahamas, and Bermuda	Turks and Caicos Islands	Dependency and Area of Special Sovereignty	Grand Turk	United Kingdom	TC			1950-01-01	1984-12-31	Retired. Area is now under WAC 281 (Although independence was agreed upon for 1982, the policy was reversed and the islands remain a British overseas territory).	1
268	26801	Puerto Rico	Caribbean, Bahamas, and Bermuda	Puerto Rico	Dependency and Area of Special Sovereignty	San Juan	United States	PR			1950-01-01	1989-12-31	Retired. Area is now under WAC 003 (territory of the US with commonwealth status)	1
273	27301	Grenada and South Grenadines	Caribbean, Bahamas, and Bermuda	Grenada	Independent State in the World	Saint George's		GD			1974-02-01		Includes Carriacou	1
274	27401	Antigua and Barbuda - UK	Caribbean, Bahamas, and Bermuda	Antigua and Barbuda - UK	Dependency and Area of Special Sovereignty	Saint John's	United Kingdom				1950-01-01	1981-10-31	Retired. Area is now under WAC 206 (The islands became an independent state within the British Commonwealth of Nations in 1981). Also see comment for WAC 206 that begin on 11/01/1981	1
275	27501	St. Kitts and Nevis	Caribbean, Bahamas, and Bermuda	Saint Kitts and Nevis	Independent State in the World	Basseterre		KN			1983-09-01		Independence: September 19, 1983 (from United Kingdom). In 1998, a vote in Nevis on a referendum to separate from Saint Kitts fell short of the two-thirds majority needed. Nevis continues in its efforts to separate from Saint Kitts.	1
276	27601	St. Lucia	Caribbean, Bahamas, and Bermuda	Saint Lucia	Independent State in the World	Castries		LC			1979-02-01		On February 22, 1979, Saint Lucia became an independent state of the Commonwealth of Nations	1
277	27701	Aruba	Caribbean, Bahamas, and Bermuda	Aruba	Dependency and Area of Special Sovereignty	Oranjestad	Netherlands	AW			1986-01-01		A Constitutional Conference Agreement on Separate Status was granted to Aruba by the Netherlands on January 1, 1986. It has been given a unique code in recognition of this status.	1
279	27901	St. Vincent and North Grenadines	Caribbean, Bahamas, and Bermuda	Saint Vincent and the Grenadines	Independent State in the World	Kingstown		VC			1979-10-01		Includes: Union Island, Mustique, Palm Island	1
280	28001	Trinidad and Tobago	Caribbean, Bahamas, and Bermuda	Trinidad and Tobago	Independent State in the World	Port-of-Spain		TT			1962-08-01		Independence Day, 31 August (1962)	1
281	28101	Turks and Caicos Islands	Caribbean, Bahamas, and Bermuda	Turks and Caicos Islands	Dependency and Area of Special Sovereignty	Grand Turk	United Kingdom	TC			1950-01-01		Includes Providenciales	1
282	28201	British Virgin Islands	Caribbean, Bahamas, and Bermuda	British Virgin Islands	Dependency and Area of Special Sovereignty	Road Town	United Kingdom	VG			1950-01-01			1
283	28301	U.S. Virgin Islands	Caribbean, Bahamas, and Bermuda	Virgin Islands	Dependency and Area of Special Sovereignty	Charlotte Amalie	United States	VI			1950-01-01	1989-12-31	Retired. Area is now under WAC 004 (Organized, unincorporated territory of the US with policy relations between the Virgin Islands and the US under the jurisdiction of the Office of Insular Affairs).	1
303	30301	Argentina	South America	Argentina	Independent State in the World	Buenos Aires		AR			1950-01-01			1
312	31201	Bolivia	South America	Bolivia	Independent State in the World	La Paz (administrative), Sucre (constitutional)		BO			1950-01-01			1
316	31601	Brazil	South America	Brazil	Independent State in the World	Brasília, DF		BR			1950-01-01			1
324	32401	Chile	South America	Chile	Independent State in the World	Santiago		CL			1950-01-01			1
327	32701	Colombia	South America	Colombia	Independent State in the World	Bogota		CO			1950-01-01		Includes San Andres Island	1
337	33701	Ecuador	South America	Ecuador	Independent State in the World	Quito		EC			1950-01-01			1
340	34001	Falkland Islands	South America	Falkland Islands (Islas Malvinas)	Dependency and Area of Special Sovereignty	Stanley	United Kingdom	FK			1950-01-01		U.K. Overseas Territory (also claimed by Argentina)	1
344	34401	French Guiana	South America	French Guiana	Dependency and Area of Special Sovereignty		France	GF			1950-01-01		French Guiana, Guadeloupe, Martinique and Reunion are departments (first-order administrative units) of France, and are therefore not dependencies or areas of special sovereignty. They are included in this list only for the convenience of the user (State department)	1
350	35001	Guyana	South America	Guyana	Independent State in the World	Georgetown		GY			1966-05-01		Independence: May 26, 1966; Republic, February 23, 1970	1
365	36501	Paraguay	South America	Paraguay	Independent State in the World	Asunción		PY			1950-01-01			1
368	36801	Peru	South America	Peru	Independent State in the World	Lima		PE			1950-01-01			1
379	37901	Suriname	South America	Suriname	Independent State in the World	Paramaribo		SR			1975-11-01		SURINAM (SURINAME): Independence: November 25, 1975.	1
385	38501	Uruguay	South America	Uruguay	Independent State in the World	Montevideo		UY			1950-01-01			1
388	38801	Venezuela	South America	Venezuela	Independent State in the World	Caracas		VE			1950-01-01			1
401	40101	Albania	Europe	Albania	Independent State in the World	Tirana		AL			1950-01-01			1
402	40201	Andorra	Europe	Andorra	Independent State in the World	Andorra la Vella		AD			1950-01-01			1
403	40301	Austria	Europe	Austria	Independent State in the World	Vienna		AT			1950-01-01			1
405	40501	Armenia	Europe	Armenia	Independent State in the World	Yerevan		AM			1992-01-01			1
407	40701	Azerbaijan	Europe	Azerbaijan	Independent State in the World	Baku		AZ			1992-01-01			1
409	40901	Belgium	Europe	Belgium	Independent State in the World	Brussels		BE			1950-01-01			1
410	41001	Bosnia and Herzegovina	Europe	Bosnia and Herzegovina	Independent State in the World	Sarajevo		BA			1992-09-01			1
411	41101	Bulgaria	Europe	Bulgaria	Independent State in the World	Sofia		BG			1950-01-01			1
413	41301	Belarus	Europe	Belarus	Independent State in the World	Minsk		BY			1992-01-01			1
415	41501	Croatia	Europe	Croatia	Independent State in the World	Zagreb		HR			1992-09-01			1
417	41701	Czechoslovakia	Europe	Czechoslovakia	Independent State in the World	Prague					1950-01-01	1992-12-31	On 1 January 1993, the country underwent a velvet divorce into its two national components, the Czech Republic and Slovakia. WAC 418 is Czech Republic and WAC 483 Slovakia.	1
418	41801	Czech Republic	Europe	Czech Republic	Independent State in the World	Prague		CZ			1993-01-01			1
419	41901	Denmark	Europe	Denmark	Independent State in the World	Copenhagen		DK			1950-01-01			1
422	42201	Estonia	Europe	Estonia	Independent State in the World	Tallinn		EE			1992-01-01			1
425	42501	Finland	Europe	Finland	Independent State in the World	Helsinki		FI			1950-01-01			1
427	42701	France	Europe	France	Independent State in the World	Paris		FR			1950-01-01		Includes Corsica	1
428	42801	East Germany	Europe	East Germany	Independent State in the World			DD			1950-01-01	1990-09-30	Retired. Area is now combined with retired WAC 430, under WAC 429	1
429	42901	Germany	Europe	West Germany	Independent State in the World	Berlin		DE			1950-01-01	1990-09-30	See comments for WAC 428	0
429	42902	Germany	Europe	Germany	Independent State in the World	Berlin		DE			1990-10-01		See comments for WAC 428	1
430	43001	Berlin	Europe	Berlin	Dependency and Area of Special Sovereignty						1950-01-01	1990-09-30	East Berlin and West Berlin	1
431	43101	Gibraltar	Europe	Gibraltar	Dependency and Area of Special Sovereignty	Gibraltar	United Kingdom	GI			1950-01-01			1
432	43201	Georgia	Europe	Georgia	Independent State in the World	Tbilisi		GE			1992-01-01			1
433	43301	Greece	Europe	Greece	Independent State in the World	Athens		GR			1950-01-01			1
437	43701	Hungary	Europe	Hungary	Independent State in the World	Budapest		HU			1950-01-01	2012-03-31		0
437	43702	Hungary	Europe	Hungary	Independent State in the World	Budapest		HU			2012-04-01			1
439	43901	Iceland	Europe	Iceland	Independent State in the World	Reykjavmk		IS			1950-01-01			1
441	44101	Ireland	Europe	Ireland	Independent State in the World	Dublin		IE			1950-01-01			1
450	45001	Italy	Europe	Italy	Independent State in the World	Rome		IT			1950-01-01			1
451	45101	Latvia	Europe	Latvia	Independent State in the World	Riga		LV			1992-01-01			1
452	45201	Lithuania	Europe	Lithuania	Independent State in the World	Vilnius		LT			1992-01-01			1
453	45301	Liechtenstein	Europe	Liechtenstein	Independent State in the World	Vaduz		LI			1994-01-01			1
454	45401	Luxembourg	Europe	Luxembourg	Independent State in the World	Luxembourg		LU			1950-01-01			1
455	45501	Macedonia	Europe	Macedonia	Independent State in the World	Skopje		MK			1992-09-01		Macedonia gained its independence from Yugoslavia (WAC 497 retired), but international recognition was delayed.	1
456	45601	Malta	Europe	Malta	Independent State in the World	Valletta		MT			1964-09-01		Independence: September 21, 1964.	1
457	45701	Moldova	Europe	Moldova	Independent State in the World	Chisinau		MD			1992-01-01			1
458	45801	Monaco	Europe	Monaco	Independent State in the World	Monaco		MC			1950-01-01			1
459	45901	Montenegro	Europe	FRY	Independent State in the World	Belgrade		YU			1992-09-01	2003-01-31	Retired 2003-01-31. In February 2003, Serbia (WAC 480) and Montenegro (WAC 459) asserted the formation of a joint independent state. The new entity Serbia and Montenegro (WAC 477) was recognized as a state by the United States effective 2/2003.	0
459	45902	Montenegro	Europe	Montenegro	Independent State in the World	Podgorica		ME			2006-10-01		Effective October 2006, the joint independent state of Serbia and Montenegro (WAC 477), formerly Montenegro (WAC 459) and Serbia (WAC 480), was once again recognized as separate states. WAC 477 was retired and their original WACs of 459 and 480 were reactivated.	1
461	46101	Netherlands	Europe	Netherlands	Independent State in the World	Amsterdam		NL			1950-01-01			1
465	46501	Norway	Europe	Norway	Independent State in the World	Oslo		NO			1950-01-01			1
467	46701	Poland	Europe	Poland	Independent State in the World	Warsaw		PL			1950-01-01			1
469	46901	Portugal	Europe	Portugal	Independent State in the World	Lisbon		PT			1950-01-01		Includes: Azores and Madeira Islands	1
473	47301	Romania	Europe	Romania	Independent State in the World	Bucharest		RO			1950-01-01			1
475	47501	Russia (European Part)	Europe	Russia	Independent State in the World	Moscow		RU			1992-01-01		Demarcation line between Russia in Europe and Russia in Far East: Ural Mountains and Western Boundary of Kazakhstan and Caspian Sea.	1
477	47701	Serbia and Montenegro	Europe	Serbia and Montenegro	Independent State in the World	Belgrade		CS			2003-02-01	2006-09-30	Created 2003-02-01. In February 2003, Serbia (WAC 480) and Montenegro (WAC 459) asserted the formation of a joint independent state. The new entity Serbia and Montenegro (WAC 477) was recognized as a state by the United States effective 2/2003. Retired 2006-09-30. Effective October 2006, the joint independent state of Serbia and Montenegro (WAC 477), formerly Montenegro (WAC 459) and Serbia (WAC 480), was once again recognized as separate states. WAC 477 was retired and their original WACs of 459 and 480 were reactivated.	1
479	47901	San Marino	Europe	San Marino	Independent State in the World	San Marino		SM			1950-01-01			1
480	48001	Serbia	Europe	FRY	Independent State in the World	Belgrade		YU			1992-09-01	2003-01-31	Retired 2003-01-31. In February 2003, Serbia (WAC 480) and Montenegro (WAC 459) asserted the formation of a joint independent state. The new entity Serbia and Montenegro (WAC 477) was recognized as a state by the United States effective 2/2003.	0
480	48002	Serbia	Europe	Serbia	Independent State in the World	Belgrade		RS			2006-10-01		Effective October 2006, the joint independent state of Serbia and Montenegro (WAC 477), formerly Montenegro (WAC 459) and Serbia (WAC 480), was once again recognized as separate states. WAC 477 was retired and their original WACs of 459 and 480 were reactivated.	1
481	48101	Slovenia	Europe	Slovenia	Independent State in the World	Ljubljana		SI			1992-09-01			1
482	48201	Spain	Europe	Spain	Independent State in the World	Madrid		ES			1950-01-01		Includes: Balearic Islands and Canary Island	1
483	48301	Slovakia	Europe	Slovakia	Independent State in the World	Bratislava		SK			1993-01-01			1
484	48401	Sweden	Europe	Sweden	Independent State in the World	Stockholm		SE			1950-01-01			1
486	48601	Switzerland	Europe	Switzerland	Independent State in the World	Bern		CH			1950-01-01			1
488	48801	Ukraine	Europe	Ukraine	Independent State in the World	Kyiv		UA			1992-01-01			1
489	48901	U.S.S.R. (European Part)	Europe	U.S.S.R.	Independent State in the World	Moscow		SU			1950-01-01	1991-12-31	Retired. Area was divided under WACs: 405, 407, 413, 422, 432, 451, 452, 457, 475, 488.	1
493	49301	United Kingdom	Europe	United Kingdom	Independent State in the World	London		GB			1950-01-01		Includes: Great Britain, Channel Islands, Hebrides, Shetland Islands, Isle of Man, and Northern Ireland.	1
494	49401	Kosovo	Europe	Kosovo	Independent State in the World	Pristina		KV			2008-03-01		Kosovo declared its independence from Serbia on February 17, 2008.	1
497	49701	Yugoslavia	Europe	Yugoslavia	Independent State in the World	Belgrade		YU			1950-01-01	1962-12-31	Current WACs for former Yugoslavian subentities are: 410, 415, 455, 459, 480, and 481.	0
497	49702	Yugoslavia	Europe	Yugoslavia	Independent State in the World	Belgrade		YU			1963-01-01	1992-08-31	Current WACs for former Yugoslavian subentities are: 410, 415, 455, 459, 480, and 481.	1
500	50001	Algeria	Africa	Algeria	Independent State in the World	Algiers		DZ			1962-07-01		Independence: July 5, 1962 (from France).	1
501	50101	South Sudan	Africa	South Sudan	Independent State in the World	Juba		SS			2011-08-01		A Split From Sudan	1
502	50201	Angola	Africa	Angola	Independent State in the World	Luanda		AO			1975-11-01		Independence: November 11, 1975.	1
503	50301	Burundi	Africa	Burundi	Independent State in the World	Bujumbura		BI			1962-07-01		Independence: July 1, 1962 (from Belgium).	1
504	50401	Cameroon	Africa	Cameroon	Independent State in the World	Yaoundi		CM			1960-01-01		Independence: January 1, 1960 (for areas formerly ruled by France) and October 1, 1961 (for territory formerly ruled by Britain).	1
506	50601	Canary Island	Africa	Spain	Independent State in the World	Madrid		ES			1950-01-01	1989-12-31	Canary Islands-Spain. Retired. Area is now under WAC 482.	1
507	50701	Cape Verde Islands	Africa	Cape Verde	Independent State in the World	Praia		CV			1975-07-01		Independence: July 5, 1975.	1
509	50901	Central African Republic	Africa	Central African Republic	Independent State in the World	Bangui		CF			1960-08-01		Independence: August 13, 1960.	1
510	51001	Botswana	Africa	Botswana	Independent State in the World	Gaborone		BW			1966-09-01		Independence: September 30, 1966.	1
511	51101	Chad	Africa	Chad	Independent State in the World	N'Djamena		TD			1960-08-01		Independence: August 11, 1960 (from France).	1
513	51301	Comoros	Africa	Comoros	Independent State in the World	Moroni		KM			1975-07-01		Independence: July 6, 1975 (Mayotte remains under French administration).	1
515	51501	Republic of the Congo	Africa	Congo (Brazzaville)	Independent State in the World	Brazzaville		CG			1960-08-01		Congo (Brazzaville): Independence: August 15, 1960.	1
517	51701	Democratic Republic of the Congo	Africa	Congo (Kinshasa)	Independent State in the World	Kinshasa		CD			1960-06-01		Congo (Kinshasa): Independence: June 30, 1960 (from Belgium). Formerly called Zaire until name change in 1997.	1
519	51901	Benin	Africa	Benin	Independent State in the World	Porto-Novo		BJ			1960-08-01		The territory became a French Colony in 1872 and achieved independence on 1 August 1960, as the Republic of Benin. Formerly known as Dahomey.	1
521	52101	Equatorial Guinea	Africa	Equatorial Guinea	Independent State in the World	Malabo		GQ			1968-10-01		12 October 1968 (Independence from Spain)	1
522	52201	Ethiopia	Africa	Ethiopia	Independent State in the World	Addis Ababa		ET			1950-01-01			1
523	52301	Eritrea	Africa	Eritrea	Independent State in the World	Asmara		ER			1993-05-01		Split from Ethiopia (522) and became an independent country in 5/1/1993	1
525	52501	Djibouti	Africa	Djibouti	Independent State in the World	Djibouti		DJ			1977-06-01		Independence: June 27, 1977 (from France)	1
526	52601	Gabon	Africa	Gabon	Independent State in the World	Libreville		GA			1960-08-01		Independence: August 17, 1960 (from France)	1
527	52701	The Gambia	Africa	The Gambia	Independent State in the World	Banjul		GM			1965-02-01		Independence: February 18, 1965 (from UK)	1
529	52901	Ghana	Africa	Ghana	Independent State in the World	Accra		GH			1957-03-01		GHANA: Independence: March 6, 1957 (from UK)	1
531	53101	Guinea	Africa	Guinea	Independent State in the World	Conakry		GN			1958-10-01		2 October 1958 (from France)	1
533	53301	Cote d'Ivoire	Africa	Cote d'Ivoire	Independent State in the World	Yamoussoukro		CI			1960-08-01		Independence: 7 August 1960 (from France). Formerly known as Ivory Coast.	1
535	53501	Kenya	Africa	Kenya	Independent State in the World	Nairobi		KE			1963-12-01		12 December 1963 (from UK)	1
536	53601	Lesotho	Africa	Lesotho	Independent State in the World	Maseru		LS			1966-10-01		4 October 1966 (from UK)	1
537	53701	Liberia	Africa	Liberia	Independent State in the World	Monrovia		LR			1950-01-01			1
538	53801	Libya	Africa	Libya	Independent State in the World	Tripoli		LY			1951-12-01	2011-10-31	LIBYA: Independence: December 24, 1951 (from UN trusteeship)	0
538	53802	Libya	Africa	Libya	Independent State in the World	Tripoli		LY			2011-11-01		LIBYA: Independence: December 24, 1951 (from UN trusteeship)	1
540	54001	Madeira Islands	Africa	Portugal	Independent State in the World	Lisbon		PT			1950-01-01	1989-12-31	Madeira Islands-Portugal. Retired. Area is now under WAC 469	1
541	54101	Madagascar	Africa	Madagascar	Independent State in the World	Antananarivo		MG			1960-06-01		MADAGASCAR (MALAGASY REPUBLIC): Independence: June 26, 1960 (from France)	1
542	54201	Malawi	Africa	Malawi	Independent State in the World	Lilongwe		MW			1964-07-01		6 July 1964 (from UK)	1
543	54301	Mali	Africa	Mali	Independent State in the World	Bamako		ML			1960-09-01		MALI: Independence: September 22, 1960 (from France)	1
545	54501	Mauritania	Africa	Mauritania	Independent State in the World	Nouakchott		MR			1960-11-01		MAURITANIA: Independence: November 28, 1960 (from France)	1
546	54601	Mauritius	Africa	Mauritius	Independent State in the World	Port Louis		MU			1968-03-01		MAURITIUS: Independence: March 12, 1968 (from UK, became a republic in 1992)	1
547	54701	Mayotte	Africa	Mayotte	Dependency and Area of Special Sovereignty	Mamoudzou	France	YT			1950-01-01			1
548	54801	Morocco	Africa	Morocco	Independent State in the World	Rabat		MA			1956-03-01		Independence: March 2, 1956 (from France). WAC 579 Western Sahara is created by mistake, which belongs to 548.	1
550	55001	Mozambique	Africa	Mozambique	Independent State in the World	Maputo		MZ			1975-06-01		MOZAMBIQUE: Independence: June 25, 1975 (from Portugal)	1
554	55401	Niger	Africa	Niger	Independent State in the World	Niamey		NE			1960-08-01		3 August 1960 (from France)	1
555	55501	Nigeria	Africa	Nigeria	Independent State in the World	Abuja		NG			1960-10-01		1 October 1960 (from UK)	1
559	55901	Guinea-Bissau	Africa	Guinea-Bissau	Independent State in the World	Bissau		GW			1973-09-01		GUINEA BISSAU: Independence: September 24, 1973 (proclaimed unilaterally); September 10, 1974 (de jure from Portugal).	1
562	56201	South Africa	Africa	South Africa	Independent State in the World	Pretoria (administrative)		ZA			1950-01-01			1
563	56301	Reunion Island	Africa	Reunion	Dependency and Area of Special Sovereignty		France	RE			1950-01-01		French Guiana, Guadeloupe, Martinique and Reunion are departments (first-order administrative units) of France, and are therefore not dependencies or areas of special sovereignty. They are included in this list only for the convenience of the user (State department)	1
565	56501	Zimbabwe	Africa	Zimbabwe	Independent State in the World	Harare		ZW			1980-04-01		18 April 1980 (from the UK)	1
566	56601	Rwanda	Africa	Rwanda	Independent State in the World	Kigali		RW			1962-07-01		1 July 1962 (from Belgium-administered UN trusteeship)	1
567	56701	Sao Tome and Principe	Africa	Sao Tome and Principe	Independent State in the World	Sco Tomi		ST			1975-07-01			1
568	56801	Rodrigues Islands	Africa	Mauritius	Independent State in the World	Port Louis		MU			1968-03-01		RODRIGUES ISLANDS-MAURITIUS: In 1968, Rodrigues was forcefully joined with Mauritius when it attained independence; today it is an autonomous region of Mauritius which aspires to full sovereignty.	1
569	56901	Senegal	Africa	Senegal	Independent State in the World	Dakar		SN			1960-04-01		SENEGAL: Independence: 4 April 1960 (from France); note - complete independence achieved upon dissolution of federation with Mali on 20 August 1960	1
570	57001	Seychelles Islands	Africa	Seychelles	Independent State in the World	Victoria		SC			1976-06-01		Independence: 29 June 1976 (from UK)	1
571	57101	Sierra Leone	Africa	Sierra Leone	Independent State in the World	Freetown		SL			1961-04-01		27 April 1961 (from UK)	1
573	57301	Somalia	Africa	Somalia	Independent State in the World	Mogadishu		SO			1960-07-01		1 July 1960 (from a merger of British Somaliland, which became independent from the UK on 26 June 1960, and Italian Somaliland, which became independent from the Italian-administered UN trusteeship on 1 July 1960, to form the Somali Republic	1
575	57501	Namibia	Africa	Namibia	Independent State in the World	Windhoek		NA			1990-03-01		Independence: 21 March 1990 (from South African mandate)	1
580	58001	Saint Helena, Ascension, and Tristan da Cunha	Africa	Saint Helena, Ascension, and Tristan da Cunha	Dependency and Area of Special Sovereignty	Jamestown	United Kingdom	SH			1950-01-01		In 2009, Saint Helena and its two territories received equal status under a new constitution, and the British Overseas Territory was renamed Saint Helena, Ascension, and Tristan da Cunha.	1
582	58201	Swaziland	Africa	Swaziland	Independent State in the World	Mbabane (administrative)		SZ			1968-09-01		Independence Day, 6 September (1968)	1
583	58301	Sudan	Africa	Sudan	Independent State in the World	Khartoum		SD			1956-01-01		Independence Day, 1 January (1956)	1
585	58501	Tanzania	Africa	Tanzania	Independent State in the World	Dar es Salaam		TZ			1964-04-01		Tanganyika united with Zanzibar 26 April 1964 to form the United Republic of Tanganyika and Zanzibar; renamed United Republic of Tanzania 29 October 1964	1
586	58601	Togo	Africa	Togo	Independent State in the World	Lomi		TG			1960-04-01		Independence Day, 27 April (1960)	1
588	58801	Tunisia	Africa	Tunisia	Independent State in the World	Tunis		TN			1956-03-01		Independence Day, 20 March (1956);	1
590	59001	Uganda	Africa	Uganda	Independent State in the World	Kampala		UG			1962-10-01		Independence Day, 9 October (1962)	1
591	59101	Egypt	Africa	Egypt	Independent State in the World	Cairo		EG			1950-01-01		Name change 6/18/1953	1
593	59301	Upper Volta	Africa	Upper Volta	Independent State in the World	Ouagadougou		HV			1960-08-01	1984-09-30	Independence gained 8/5/1960. Originally known as Republic of Upper Volta	0
593	59302	Burkina Faso	Africa	Burkina Faso	Independent State in the World	Ouagadougou		BF			1984-10-01		Independence gained 8/5/1960. Originally known as Republic of Upper Volta	1
597	59701	Zambia	Africa	Zambia	Independent State in the World	Lusaka		ZM			1964-10-01		Independence Day, 24 October (1964)	1
599	59901	Rhodesia	Africa	Rhodesia	Dependency and Area of Special Sovereignty	Salisbury	United Kingdom				1950-01-01	1980-03-31	Zimbabwe (formerly Rhodesia) should have retained WAC 565 that starts on 4/1/1980.	1
605	60501	Bahrain	Middle East	Bahrain	Independent State in the World	Manama		BH			1971-08-01		National Day, 16 December (1971); note - 15 August 1971 was the date of independence from the UK, 16 December 1971 was the date of independence from British protection	1
611	61101	Cyprus	Middle East	Cyprus	Independent State in the World	Nicosia		CY			1960-08-01		Independence: August 16, 1960.	1
632	63201	Iran	Middle East	Iran	Independent State in the World	Tehran		IR			1950-01-01	1979-11-30	Constitution: Ratified in December 1979, revised 1989	0
632	63202	Iran	Middle East	Iran	Independent State in the World	Tehran		IR			1979-12-01		Constitution: Ratified in December 1979, revised 1989	1
634	63401	Iraq	Middle East	Iraq	Independent State in the World	Baghdad		IQ			1950-01-01			1
636	63601	Israel	Middle East	Israel	Independent State in the World	Jerusalem		IL			1950-01-01		Independence Day, 14 May (1948); note - Israel declared independence on 14 May 1948, but the Jewish calendar is lunar and the holiday may occur in April or May	1
639	63901	Jordan	Middle East	Jordan	Independent State in the World	Amman		JO			1950-01-01			1
644	64401	Kuwait	Middle East	Kuwait	Independent State in the World	Kuwait		KW			1961-06-01		Independence: 19 June 1961 (from the UK)	1
647	64701	Lebanon	Middle East	Lebanon	Independent State in the World	Beirut		LB			1950-01-01			1
658	65801	Oman	Middle East	Oman	Independent State in the World	Muscat		OM			1950-01-01			1
664	66401	Qatar	Middle East	Qatar	Independent State in the World	Doha		QA			1971-09-01		Independence: 3 September 1971 (from the UK)	1
667	66701	People's Democratic Republic of Yemen	Middle East	South Yemen	Independent State in the World	Aden		YD			1950-01-01	1990-04-30	Merged into WAC 694 on May 22, 1990.	1
670	67001	Saudi Arabia	Middle East	Saudi Arabia	Independent State in the World	Riyadh		SA			1950-01-01			1
676	67601	Syria	Middle East	Syria	Independent State in the World	Damascus		SY			1950-01-01			1
678	67801	United Arab Emirates	Middle East	United Arab Emirates	Independent State in the World	Abu Dhabi		AE			1971-12-01		Independence Day, 2 December (1971)	1
679	67901	Turkey	Middle East	Turkey	Independent State in the World	Ankara		TR			1950-01-01			1
694	69401	Yemen	Middle East	North Yemen	Independent State in the World	Sana'a		YE			1950-01-01	1990-04-30		0
694	69402	Yemen	Middle East	Yemen	Independent State in the World	Sana'a		YE			1990-05-01			1
701	70101	Afghanistan	Far East	Afghanistan	Independent State in the World	Kabul		AF			1950-01-01			1
702	70201	Bhutan	Far East	Bhutan	Independent State in the World	Thimphu		BT			1950-01-01			1
703	70301	Bangladesh	Far East	Bangladesh	Independent State in the World	Dhaka		BD			1971-12-01		Defeated Pakistani forces 12/16/1971. Next day declared independent Republic of Bangladesh	1
704	70401	Brunei	Far East	Brunei	Independent State in the World	Bandar Seri Begawan		BN			1984-01-01		National Day, 23 February (1984); note - 1 January 1984 was the date of independence from the UK, 23 February 1984 was the date of independence from British protection	1
705	70501	Bonin Islands	Far East	Bonin Islands	Dependency and Area of Special Sovereignty		United States				1950-01-01	1968-05-31	Retired. Area is now under WAC 736. The United States returned control of the islands to Japan in June 1968. (No airports in this WAC.)	1
706	70601	Myanmar	Far East	Burma	Independent State in the World	Rangoon		MM			1950-01-01			1
707	70701	British Indian Ocean Territory	Far East	British Indian Ocean Territory	Dependency and Area of Special Sovereignty	None	United Kingdom	IO			1968-03-01		Became member of British Commonwealth on 3/12/1968. Includes: Chagos Islands	1
709	70901	Cambodia	Far East	Cambodia	Independent State in the World	Phnom Penh		KH			1953-11-01		Cambodia got its independence from France on Nov. 9, 1953	1
711	71101	Sri Lanka	Far East	Sri Lanka	Independent State in the World	Colombo		LK			1950-01-01			1
713	71301	China	Far East	China	Independent State in the World	Beijing		CN			1950-01-01		See also Taiwan. With the establishment of diplomatic relations with China on January 1, 1979, the US Government recognized the People's Republic of China as the sole legal government of China and acknowledged the Chinese position that there is only one China.	1
729	72901	Hong Kong	Far East	Hong Kong	Dependency and Area of Special Sovereignty		China (July 1, 1997), previously United Kingdom	HK			1950-01-01		Under a Sino-British declaration of September 1984, Hong Kong reverted to Chinese control on July 1, 1997. It is now a semi-autonomous special administrative region of China.	1
733	73301	India	Far East	India	Independent State in the World	New Delhi		IN			1950-01-01			1
736	73601	Japan	Far East	Japan	Independent State in the World	Tokyo		JP			1950-01-01		Includes: Okinawa and Bonin Islands	1
738	73801	Kazakhstan	Far East	Kazakhstan	Independent State in the World	Astana		KZ			1992-01-01			1
743	74301	Kyrgyzstan	Far East	Kyrgyzstan	Independent State in the World	Bishkek		KG			1991-08-01		Independence: August 31, 1991 (from the Soviet Union).	1
744	74401	Laos	Far East	Laos	Independent State in the World	Vientiane		LA			1950-01-01			1
747	74701	Macau	Far East	Macau	Dependency and Area of Special Sovereignty	Macau	China (December 20, 1999), previously Portugal	MO			1950-01-01		Under the Sino-Portuguese Joint Declaration on the Question of Macau signed in 1987, Macau reverted to Chinese control on December 20, 1999. It is now a semi-autonomous special administrative region of China.	1
749	74901	Malaysia	Far East	Malaysia	Independent State in the World	Kuala Lumpur		MY			1957-08-01		Got its independence from UK on Aug. 31, 1957.	1
750	75001	Maldives	Far East	Maldives	Independent State in the World	Male		MV			1965-07-01		Was under UK protection, independence Jul. 26, 1965.	1
751	75101	Mongolia	Far East	Mongolia	Independent State in the World	Ulaanbaatar		MN			1950-01-01			1
755	75501	Nepal	Far East	Nepal	Independent State in the World	Kathmandu		NP			1950-01-01			1
757	75701	North Korea	Far East	North Korea	Independent State in the World	Pyongyang		KP			1950-01-01			1
759	75901	North Vietnam	Far East	Vietnam	Independent State in the World	Hanoi		VN			1950-01-01	1976-06-30	Retired. Area is part of WAC 791 that starts on 7/1/1976.	1
761	76101	Okinawa/Ryukyu Islands	Far East	Okinawa/Ryukyu Islands	Dependency and Area of Special Sovereignty		United States				1950-01-01	1972-04-30	Retired. Area is now under WAC 736. The United States returned control of the islands to Japan in May 1972.	1
764	76401	Pakistan	Far East	Pakistan	Independent State in the World	Islamabad		PK			1950-01-01			1
766	76601	Philippines	Far East	Philippines	Independent State in the World	Manila		PH			1950-01-01			1
770	77001	Russia (Asian Part)	Far East	Russia	Independent State in the World	Moscow		RU			1992-01-01		Demarcation line between Russia in Europe and Russia in Far East: Ural Mountains and Western Boundary of Kazakhstan and Caspian Sea.	1
776	77601	Singapore	Far East	Singapore	Independent State in the World	Singapore		SG			1965-08-01		Split from Malaysian Federation on Aug. 9, 1965.	1
778	77801	South Korea	Far East	South Korea	Independent State in the World	Seoul		KR			1950-01-01			1
780	78001	South Vietnam	Far East	Vietnam	Independent State in the World	Hanoi		VN			1950-01-01	1976-06-30	Retired. Area is now under WAC 791	1
781	78101	Taiwan	Far East	Taiwan	Dependency and Area of Special Sovereignty	Tai-pei	China	TW			1950-01-01		Claimed by both the Government of the People's Republic of China and the authorities on Taiwan. Administered by the authorities on Taiwan.	1
782	78201	Thailand	Far East	Thailand	Independent State in the World	Bangkok		TH			1950-01-01			1
783	78301	Tajikistan	Far East	Tajikistan	Independent State in the World	Dushanbe		TJ			1992-01-01			1
785	78501	Turkmenistan	Far East	Turkmenistan	Independent State in the World	Ashgabat		TM			1992-01-01			1
786	78601	U.S.S.R. (Asian Part)	Far East	U.S.S.R.	Independent State in the World	Moscow		SU			1950-01-01	1991-12-31	Retired. Area was divided under WACs: 738, 743, 770, 783, 785, 788	1
788	78801	Uzbekistan	Far East	Uzbekistan	Independent State in the World	Tashkent		UZ			1992-01-01			1
791	79101	Vietnam	Far East	Vietnam	Independent State in the World	Hanoi		VN			1976-07-01			1
800	80001	American Samoa	Far East	American Samoa	Dependency and Area of Special Sovereignty	Pago Pago	United States	AS			1950-01-01	1989-12-31	Retired. Area is now under WAC 005	1
801	80101	Antarctica	Australasia and Oceania	Antarctica	Dependency and Area of Special Sovereignty		None	AQ			1998-01-01		ISO defines as the territory south of 60 degrees south latitude	1
802	80201	Australia	Australasia and Oceania	Australia	Independent State in the World	Canberra		AU			1950-01-01		Includes: Norfolk Island and Tasmania	1
803	80301	Christmas Island	Australasia and Oceania	Christmas Island	Dependency and Area of Special Sovereignty	The Settlement (Flying Fish Cove)	Australia	CX			1958-10-01		Christmas Island (in the Indian Ocean approx 225 miles south of Java) became an Australian possession in 1958. A second Christmas Island (one of the Line Islands in the Central Pacific Ocean south of Hawaii) is part of the Republic of Kiribati.	1
804	80401	Papua New Guinea	Australasia and Oceania	Papua New Guinea	Independent State in the World	Port Moresby		PG			1975-09-01		Its independence from Australian-Administered UN trusteeship on Sep.16, 1975.	1
809	80901	Palau Islands	Australasia and Oceania	Palau District (TTPI)	Dependency and Area of Special Sovereignty	Koror	United States				1950-01-01	1989-12-31	Retired. Area was under WAC 005 until October 1994. Area is now under WAC 854. History: Beginning in 1950, Palau was assigned WAC 809. In 1990, Palau became part of the US Pacific Trust and Possessions under WAC 005. In October 1994, Palau gained indepe	1
810	81001	Federated States of Micronesia	Australasia and Oceania	Federated States of Micronesia	Independent State in the World	Palikir		FM			1986-11-01		Got its independence from US-Administered UN trusteeship on Nov. 6 1986. Partial breakup of Palau Islands (WAC 809) Includes: Kosrae, Ponape, Yap, Ulithi, Truk	1
812	81201	Cocos (Keeling) Islands	Australasia and Oceania	Cocos (Keeling) Islands	Dependency and Area of Special Sovereignty	West Island	Australia	CC			1955-11-01		Territory of Australia.	1
813	81301	Cook Islands	Australasia and Oceania	Cook Islands	Dependency and Area of Special Sovereignty	Avarua	New Zealand	CK			1965-08-01		Free association with New Zealand as of Aug. 4, 1965.	1
817	81701	Tuvalu	Australasia and Oceania	Tuvalu	Independent State in the World	Funafuti		TV			1978-10-01		Got its independence from UK on October 1, 1978.	1
821	82101	Fiji Islands	Australasia and Oceania	Fiji	Independent State in the World	Suva		FJ			1970-10-01		Got its independence from UK on Oct. 10, 1970.	1
823	82301	French Polynesia	Australasia and Oceania	French Polynesia	Dependency and Area of Special Sovereignty	Papeete	France	PF			1958-10-01		Overseas territory of France. Includes: Austral Islands, Marquesas Islands, Tahiti	1
824	82401	Kiribati	Australasia and Oceania	Kiribati	Independent State in the World	Tarawa		KI			1979-07-01		Got its independence from UK on July. 12, 1979. Includes: Gilbert Islands, Kanton Island, and Line Islands. There is a second Christmas Island. It is one of the Line Islands in the Central Pacific Ocean south of Hawaii. This island is also part of the Republic of Kiribati.	1
826	82601	Guam	Australasia and Oceania	Guam	Dependency and Area of Special Sovereignty	Hagatna	United States	GU			1950-01-01	1989-12-31	Retired. Area is now under WAC 005	1
832	83201	Indonesia	Australasia and Oceania	Indonesia	Independent State in the World	Jakarta		ID			1950-01-01			1
834	83401	Johnston Island	Australasia and Oceania	Johnston Atoll	Dependency and Area of Special Sovereignty		United States				1950-01-01	1989-12-31	Retired. Area is now under WAC 005	1
840	84001	Loyalty Islands	Australasia and Oceania	New Caledonia	Dependency and Area of Special Sovereignty	Noumia	France	NC			1958-10-01		Part of the French territory of New Caledonia (separate WAC of 846), whose mainland is 100 km away.	1
841	84101	Northern Mariana Islands	Australasia and Oceania	Northern Mariana Islands	Dependency and Area of Special Sovereignty	Saipan	United States	MP			1950-01-01	1989-12-31	Retired. Area is now under WAC 005	1
842	84201	Midway Islands	Australasia and Oceania	Midway Islands	Dependency and Area of Special Sovereignty		United States				1950-01-01	1989-12-31	Retired. Area is part of WAC 005.	1
843	84301	Marshall Islands	Australasia and Oceania	Marshall Islands District (TTPI)	Dependency and Area of Special Sovereignty	Majuro	United States				1950-01-01	1986-09-30	Retired. Area is part of WAC 844 that starts on 10/1/1986.	1
844	84401	Marshall Islands	Australasia and Oceania	Marshall Islands	Independent State in the World	Majuro		MH			1986-10-01		Got its independence from US trusteeship on Oct. 21, 1986.	1
845	84501	Nauru	Australasia and Oceania	Nauru	Independent State in the World	Yaren District		NR			1968-01-01		Got its independence from US trusteeship on Jan. 31, 1968.	1
846	84601	New Caledonia	Australasia and Oceania	New Caledonia	Dependency and Area of Special Sovereignty	Noumia	France	NC			1958-10-01		Overseas territory of France. Excludes Loyalty Islands (separate WAC of 840).	1
849	84901	New Hebrides	Australasia and Oceania	New Hebrides	Dependency and Area of Special Sovereignty	Port-Vila	United Kingdom/France				1950-01-01	1980-06-30	Retired. Area now is part of WAC 885 that starts on 7/1/1980.	1
851	85101	New Zealand	Australasia and Oceania	New Zealand	Independent State in the World	Wellington		NZ			1950-01-01			1
852	85201	Niue	Australasia and Oceania	Niue	Dependency and Area of Special Sovereignty	Alofi	New Zealand	NU			1974-10-01		On 19 October 1974, Niue became a self-governing parliamentary government in free association with New Zealand.	1
853	85301	Norfolk Island	Australasia and Oceania	Norfolk Island	Dependency and Area of Special Sovereignty	Kingston	Australia	NF			1950-01-01	1974-12-31	Retired. Area is now under WAC 802	1
854	85401	Palau	Australasia and Oceania	Palau	Independent State in the World	Koror		PW			1994-10-01		Beginning in 1950, Palau was assigned WAC 809. In 1990, Palau became part of the US Pacific Trust and Possessions under WAC 005. In October 1994, Palau gained independence and was assigned WAC 854.	1
861	86101	East Timor	Australasia and Oceania	East Timor	Dependency and Area of Special Sovereignty	Dili	Indonesia	TP			1975-11-01	2002-04-30	Independence (from Portugal): November 28, 1975. Restoration of independence from Indonesia: May 20, 2002. Became WAC 262 Timor-Leste with new country code TL.	1
862	86201	Timor-Leste	Australasia and Oceania	Timor-Leste	Independent State in the World	Dili		TL			2002-05-01		On 20 May 2002, Timor-Leste was internationally recognized as an independent state. East Timor (WAC 261) controlled by Indonesia became WAC 262 with new country code TL.	1
874	87401	Solomon Islands	Australasia and Oceania	Solomon Islands	Independent State in the World	Honiara		SB			1978-07-01		Got its independence from UK on July 7, 1978.	1
881	88101	Tonga	Australasia and Oceania	Tonga	Independent State in the World	Nuku'alofa		TO			1970-06-01		Got its independence from UK proctoctrate on June 4, 1970,	1
885	88501	Vanuatu	Australasia and Oceania	Vanuatu	Independent State in the World	Port-Vila		VU			1980-07-01		Got its independence from UK and France on July 30, 1980.	1
888	88801	Wake Island	Australasia and Oceania	Wake Island	Dependency and Area of Special Sovereignty		United States				1950-01-01	1989-12-31	Retired. Area is now under WAC 005	1
890	89001	Wallis and Futuna Islands	Australasia and Oceania	Wallis and Futuna	Dependency and Area of Special Sovereignty	Mata-Utu	France	WF			1959-01-01		Overseas territory of France.	1
892	89201	Samoa	Australasia and Oceania	Samoa	Independent State in the World	Apia		WS			1962-01-01			1
906	90601	British Columbia	Canada and Greenland	Canada	Independent State in the World	Ottawa		CA	BC		1950-01-01			1
911	91101	Yukon Territory	Canada and Greenland	Canada	Independent State in the World	Ottawa		CA	YT		1950-01-01			1
916	91601	Alberta	Canada and Greenland	Canada	Independent State in the World	Ottawa		CA	AB		1950-01-01			1
921	92101	Saskatchewan	Canada and Greenland	Canada	Independent State in the World	Ottawa		CA	SK		1950-01-01			1
926	92601	Manitoba	Canada and Greenland	Canada	Independent State in the World	Ottawa		CA	MB		1950-01-01			1
931	93101	Northwest Territories	Canada and Greenland	Canada	Independent State in the World	Ottawa		CA	NT		1950-01-01			1
934	93401	Nunavut Territory	Canada and Greenland	Canada	Independent State in the World	Ottawa		CA	NU		1999-04-01		Nunavut is the largest and newest federal territory of Canada; it was separated officially from the Northwest Territories (WAC=931) on 4/1/1999 via the Nunavut Act.	1
936	93601	Ontario	Canada and Greenland	Canada	Independent State in the World	Ottawa		CA	ON		1950-01-01			1
941	94101	Quebec	Canada and Greenland	Canada	Independent State in the World	Ottawa		CA	QC		1950-01-01			1
946	94601	New Brunswick	Canada and Greenland	Canada	Independent State in the World	Ottawa		CA	NB		1950-01-01			1
951	95101	Nova Scotia	Canada and Greenland	Canada	Independent State in the World	Ottawa		CA	NS		1950-01-01			1
956	95601	Prince Edward Island	Canada and Greenland	Canada	Independent State in the World	Ottawa		CA	PE		1950-01-01			1
961	96101	Newfoundland and Labrador	Canada and Greenland	Canada	Independent State in the World	Ottawa		CA	NL		1950-01-01		Originally called Newfoundland (including Labrador) with state code NL. Changed in 2002 for all time periods.	1
975	97501	Greenland	Canada and Greenland	Greenland	Dependency and Area of Special Sovereignty	Nuuk (Godtheb)	Denmark	GL			1979-01-01		An extensive self-rule as part of the Kingdom of Denmark.	1
977	97701	Saint Pierre and Miquelon	Canada and Greenland	Saint Pierre and Miquelon	Dependency and Area of Special Sovereignty	Saint-Pierre	France	PM			1958-10-01		Territorial collectivity of France.	1

== Sources and external links ==
- http://www.transtats.bts.gov/Fields.asp
- http://www.transtats.bts.gov/DL_SelectFields.asp?Table_ID=315&DB_Short_Name=Aviation%20Support%20Tables
- http://github.com/opentraveldata/opentraveldata/tree/master/data/countries/DOT
