= Transport Research International Documentation =

US transportation research database

The TRID Database (Transportation Research International Documentation) is a database that combines the records from USA Transportation Research Board's Transportation Research Information Services (TRIS) database and the Organisation for Economic Co-operation and Development's (OECD) Joint Transport Research Centre's International Transport Research Documentation (ITRD) Database. The merging of these databases formed the world's largest and most comprehensive bibliographic resource on transportation research information. As of July 2020 TRID contains more than 1.25 million records of published and ongoing research, covering all modes and disciplines of air, ground, and water transportation—books, technical reports, conference proceedings, and journal articles. Many records contain links to full-text documents. The records in TRID are indexed with a standardized vocabulary from the Transportation Research Thesaurus (TRT) which has integrated both the TRIS and ITRD thesauri. Aspects of the Australian Road Research Board's ATRI and ROAD Thesauri are also incorporated.

Among the transportation modes covered are highways and streets, public transport, railroads, maritime traffic, aviation, pipelines, pedestrians and bicycles. Among the professional disciplines from which documents in TRID arise are: public planning, management, finance, design, engineering, construction, materials science, environmental issues, safety and human factors and ergonomics, and operations.

TRID indexes documents held by the TRB Transportation Research Library and ITRD and also receives records from several external sources: 1) the J-STAGE database maintained by the Japan Science and Technology Agency; 2) Northwestern University Transportation Library; 3) the Australian Transport Index (ATRI); and 4) SafetyLit. The TRID database publishes monthly an update of the more than 800 serials from which articles arise.
