= T. R. Lakshmanan =

1st Director of the Bureau of Transportation Statistics
- In office 1994–1998
- President: Bill Clinton
- Preceded by: Agency established
- Succeeded by: Ashish Sen

Personal details
- Born: May 28, 1932 Madras, Presidency of Fort St. George, British India
- Died: February 20, 2020 (aged 87)
- Education: University of Madras (BS, MA); Ohio State University (PhD)

Triruvarur R. (T.R.) Lakshmanan was an Indian-American academic, geographer, and the inaugural Director of the Bureau of Transportation Statistics at the United States Department of Transportation, holding that position from 1994 to 1998.

Aside from his work as BTS director, Lakshmanan served as a professor at Johns Hopkins University and Boston University.
