= World Conference on Transport Research Society =

The World Conference on Transport Research Society (WCTRS) is an international research organization dedicated to transportation research. The scope of the society is multi-modal, multi-disciplinary, and multi-sectorial transportation research. The Society organizes every three years the World Conferences on Transportation Research in different parts of the world. The WCTRS has representatives and members in 67 countries and geographical areas around the World. Currently Professor Tae Hoon Oum from the University of British Columbia (Canada) is the president.

The Society and the Conference intend to play a strong leadership role in bridging the gaps between research and practice. The objective of the WCTRS is to provide a forum for the interchange of ideas among transportation researchers, managers, policy makers, and educators from all over the world, from a perspective which is multi-modal, multi-disciplinary, and multi-sectorial.

== Conferences ==
The WCTRS organizes a triennial research conference. The next World Conference on Transportation Research will be organized in Toulouse, France, and will take place from July 6 to 10, 2026.

Previous conferences took place in Europe, the Americas, Asia, and Oceania

- 16th WCTR : Montréal, Canada, 2023
- 15th WCTR : Mumbai, India, 2019
- 14th WCTR : Shanghai, China, 2016
- 13th WCTR : Rio de Janeiro, Brazil, 2013
- 12th WCTR : Lisbon, Portugal, 2010
- 11th WCTR : Berkeley, USA, 2007
- 10th WCTR : Istanbul, Turkey, 2004
- 9th WCTR : Seoul, Korea, 2001
- 8th WCTR : Antwerp, Belgium, 1998
- 7th WCTR : Sydney, Australia, 1995
- 6th WCTR : Lyon, France, 1992
- 5th WCTR : Yokohama, Japan, 1989
- 4th WCTR : Vancouver, Canada, 1986
- 3rd WCTR : Hamburg, Germany, 1983
- 2nd WCTR : London, England, 1980
- 1st WCTR : Rotterdam, Netherlands, 1977
- Pre-WCTR conference : Bruges, Belgium, 1973

== See also ==
- Transportation Research Board
