= Bureau of Transportation Statistics =

US Department of Transportation unit

Agency overview
- Formed: October 19, 1992; 34 years ago
- Jurisdiction: Federal government of the United States
- Headquarters: Washington, DC
- Employees: 70-75
- Agency executives: Vacant, Director; Rolf R. Schmitt, Ph.D., Deputy Director
- Parent agency: United States Department of Transportation
- Website: www.bts.gov

The Bureau of Transportation Statistics (BTS), part of the United States Department of Transportation (USDOT), is a government office that compiles, analyzes, and publishes information on the nation's transportation systems across various modes; and strives to improve the DOT's statistical programs through research and the development of guidelines for data collection and analysis.

BTS is a principal agency of the U.S. federal statistical system.

== History ==
BTS was officially created by the Intermodal Surface Transportation Efficiency Act (ISTEA), passed on December 18, 1991, subsequently beginning operations as a modal administration with the USDOT on October 19, 1992. In 1995, BTS absorbed the former Civil Aeronautics Board's financial and operating statistics office, incorporating it as its Office of Airline Information. BTS gained the National Transportation Library in 1998, a stipulation of the Transportation Equity Act for the 21st Century (TEA-21). Following a Congressionally-directed reorganization of the Department in 2005, BTS ceased being an independent agency and was moved under the Research and Innovative Technology Administration (RITA). The BTS director went from being a Senate-confirmed, presidentially-nominated position to being a civil service appointee named by the Secretary of Transportation.

BTS was moved again in 2015, as required by the Fixing America's Surface Transportation (FAST) Act, and was shifted, along with the rest of RITA, to the Office of the Assistant Secretary of Transportation for Research and Technology.

=== Directors ===
Since its establishment, BTS has had four directors:

1. T. R. Lakshmanan, 1994–1998
2. Ashish Sen, 1998–2002
3. Richard Kowalewski (acting), 2002–2006
4. Steven Dillingham, 2006–2011
5. Patricia S. Hu, 2011–2025
6. Rolf Schmitt (acting), 2025–2026

== Offices ==
BTS is divided into seven offices:

- Office of Statistical and Economic Analysis
- Office of Data Development and Standards
- Office of Transportation Analysis
- Office of Spatial Analysis and Visualization
- Office of Airline Information
- Office of Information and Library Sciences
- Office of Safety Data and Analysis

== Services ==
=== Data catalogs ===
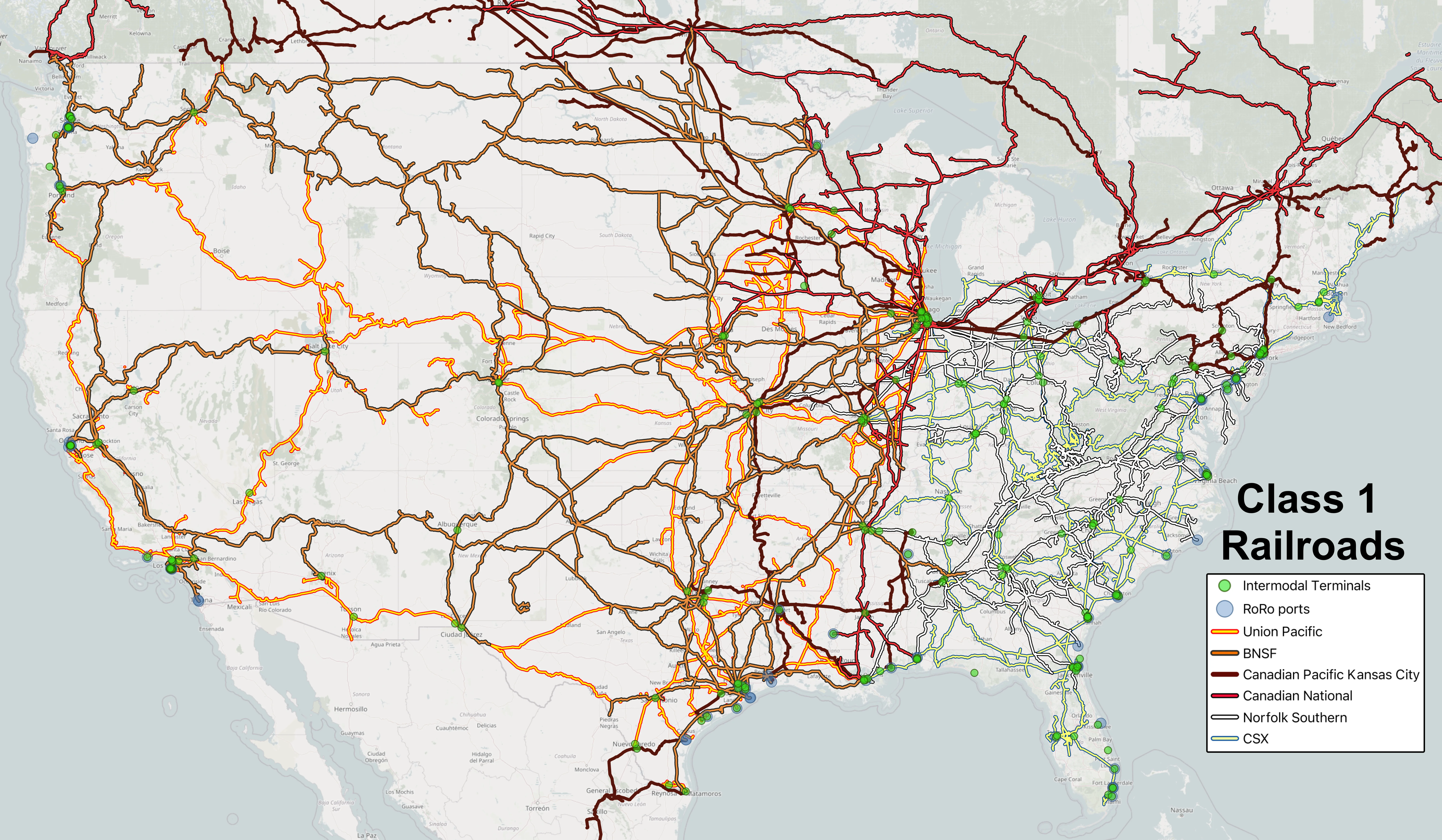
Class 1 railroads with intermodal terminals and maritime RoRo ports.

Users can access and explore BTS's collection of intermodal transportation databases through TranStats and the BTS Data Inventory; the latter also allows users to create their own visualizations from selected BTS data.

=== Office of Airline Information ===
BTS' Office of Airline Information is responsible for publishing regular reports—often monthly or quarterly—on airline performance in the United States. Topics include airline financials, origins and destinations, passenger traffic, on-time performance, and mishandled baggage. It is the direct successor to the statistics office from the former Civil Aeronautics Board.

One popular airline database included in the TranStats collection is the airline on-time performance database, which includes on-time performance of every flight, airline, and airport in the United States.

=== National Transportation Atlas Database ===
BTS maintains the National Transportation Atlas Database (NTAD), an open online repository of national-level geographic information systems data and applications related to transportation in the United States.

=== National Transportation Library ===
Another BTS product is the National Transportation Library (NTL), an online repository of transportation-centric research, reports, and datasets. Documents, which include products internal and external to the US Department of Transportation, can be accessed through a platform called RosaP.

== Products ==
=== Freight Analysis Framework ===
The FAF is a database with estimations of freight flows through the United States' transportation system, developed in collaboration with the Federal Highway Administration. Data are available at the federal, state, and metropolitan areas, representing the move of goods from 42 commodity types and across all modes of transport. Freight is quantified by weight, value, and activity, and are based on data inputs from the BTS Commodity Flow Survey, input-export records, and data acquired directly from key industries.

=== Transportation Statistics Annual Report ===
Required by the legislation that authorized BTS, the TSAR is published every year and contains high-level descriptions of the overall status of the national transportation system from the previous year. More specifically, it features information, statistics, and figures on core facets of transportation in the United States, including passenger travel, freight and logistics, economics, reliability, safety, energy use, and environmental impacts. Outside these theme areas, it also provides commentary on the state of transportation statistics and data production and recommends strategies to close or improve data gaps.

=== Vehicle Inventory and Use Survey ===
The VIUS is a regular survey of vehicle ownership, intended to better understand physical and operational characteristics of the wide range of vehicles that use the national roadway system, guide infrastructure investments, track changes in vehicle technology, and to stay tuned to critical safety needs. Done collaboration with the U.S. Census Bureau, Federal Highway Administration, and the Department of Energy, the most recent version was completed in 2022 and sampled data the owners of over 150,000 vehicles, including pick-up trucks, SUVs, minivans, light vans, straight trucks, and truck tractors.

=== Intercity Bus Atlas ===
Since 2017, BTS has been the home for the Intercity Bus Atlas, a map of all scheduled intercity passenger bus services in the United States. Using General Transit Feed Specification (GTFS) feeds collected from participating carriers, the Atlas shows the stops and routes being operated and is updated on a quarterly basis. The ICBA replaces defunct intercity bus maps and schedule services (namely Russell's Official National Motor Coach Guide) and shows the density, frequency, and extent of these operations across the country.

=== Other products ===
- COVID-19 and Transportation
- Border Crossing Data
- Commodity Flow Survey (CFS)
- Local Area Transportation Characteristics for Households (LATCH)
- National Census of Ferry Operators
- National Transit Map
- National Transportation Noise Map
- Pocket Guide App
- Port Performance Freight Statistics Program
- Tank Car Data
- TransBorder Freight Data
- Transportation Economic Trends
- Transportation Services Index
- National Transportation Statistics
- State Transportation Statistics
- County Transportation Profiles
- Congressional District Transportation Profiles
- The Week In Transportation

=== State and country codes ===
The BTS maintains its own list of codes, so-called World Area Codes (WAC), for state and country codes.

== See also ==
- Transportation in the United States
