= American Association of State Highway and Transportation Officials =

Transportation association

- Abbreviation: AASHTO
- Formation: December 12, 1914; 111 years ago
- Type: Non-governmental organization
- Tax ID no.: 53-0204654
- Legal status: 501(c)(3)
- Purpose: Coordination among state departments of transportation
- Headquarters: 555 12th Street NW, Suite 1000; Washington, D.C. 20004
- Region served: United States
- Executive Director: Jim Tymon
- President: Russell McMurry, GDOT
- Vice President: Marc Williams, TxDOT
- Treasurer: Justin Powell, SCDOT
- Affiliations: 50 state departments of transportation and in District of Columbia and Puerto Rico
- Revenue: $88.86 million (2019)
- Expenses: $81.58 million (2019)
- Employees: 134 (2016)
- Volunteers: 150 (2016)
- Website: www.transportation.org
- Formerly called: American Association of State Highway Officials

The American Association of State Highway and Transportation Officials (AASHTO) is a standards setting body which publishes specifications, test protocols, and guidelines that are used in highway design and construction throughout the United States. Despite its name, the association represents not only highways but air, rail, water, and public transportation as well.

Although AASHTO sets transportation standards and policy for the United States as a whole, AASHTO is not an agency of the federal government; rather it is an organization of the states themselves. Policies of AASHTO are not federal laws or policies, but rather are ways to coordinate state laws and policies in the field of transportation.

== Purpose ==
The American Association of State Highway Officials (AASHO) was founded on December 12, 1914. Its name was changed to American Association of State Highway and Transportation Officials on November 13, 1973. The name change reflects a broadened scope to cover all modes of transportation, although most of its activities are still specific to highways.

While AASHTO is not a government body, it does possess quasi-governmental powers in the sense that the organizations that supply its members customarily obey most AASHTO decisions.

== Membership ==
The voting membership of AASHTO consists of the department of transportation of each state in the United States, as well as those of Puerto Rico and the District of Columbia.

The United States Department of Transportation has a non-voting associate membership.

== Publications ==
Some noteworthy AASHTO publications are:

- A Policy on Geometric Design of Highways and Streets, often called "The Green Book" because of the color of its cover. This book covers the functional design of roads and highways including such things as the layout of intersections, horizontal curves, and vertical curves.
- Standard Specifications for Transportation Materials and Methods of Sampling and Testing.
- AASHTO LRFD Bridge Design Specifications. This manual is the base bridge design manual that all DOTs use across the US.
- Manual for Assessing Safety Hardware (MASH), crash testing criteria for safety hardware devices for use on highways; it updates and replaces NCHRP Report 350.

In addition to its publications, AASHTO performs or cooperates in research projects. One such project is the AASHO Road Test, which is a primary source of data used when considering transport policies and the structural design of roads. Much of AASHTO's current research is performed by the National Cooperative Highway Research Program (NCHRP) which is administered by the Transportation Research Board (TRB), a division of the National Academy of Sciences, Engineering, and Medicine.

AASHTO re:source, formerly the AASHTO Materials Reference Laboratory (AMRL), accredits laboratories. Accreditation is often required to submit test results to state DOTs. For example, a contract for the construction of a highway bridge may require a minimum compressive strength for the concrete used. The contract will specify AASHTO Test Designation T 22, "Compressive Strength of Cylindrical Concrete Specimens," as the means of determining compressive strength. The laboratory performing T 22 will be required to be accredited in that test.

AASHTO Product Evaluation and Audit Solution (AASHTO PEAS), formerly National Transportation Product Evaluation Program (NTPEP) provides audits and product acceptance testing. The program is widely used by many state DOTs to populate their approved product lists or approved supplier lists.

AASHTO coordinates the numbering of Interstate Highways, U.S. Highways, and U.S. Bicycle Routes.

== Standards ==
Current and withdrawn AASHTO standards include:

- AASHTO TP10: Standard Test Method for Determining the tensile strength and temperature at fracture of field or laboratory compacted bituminous mixtures by measuring the tensile load in a specimen which is cooled at a constant rate while being restrained from contraction.
- AASHTO T307: Standard Method of Test for Determining the Resilient Modulus of Soils and Aggregate Materials.
- AASHTO T321/TP4: Test Standard for Determining the Fatigue Life of Compacted Hot-Mix Asphalt (HMA) Subjected to Repeated Flexural Bending.
- AASHTO TP31: Standard Test Method for Determining the Resilient Modulus of Bituminous Mixtures by Indirect Tension
- AASHTO TP62: Standard Method of Test for Determining Dynamic Modulus of Hot-Mix Asphalt Concrete Mixtures
- AASHTO T321-03/TP8: Test Standard for Determining the Fatigue Life of Compacted Hot-Mix Asphalt (HMA) Subjected to Repeated Flexural Bending

== See also ==
- National Transportation Communications for Intelligent Transportation System Protocol (NTCIP)
- National Association of City Transportation Officials (NACTO)
