= ETransportation =

eTransportation
- Discipline: Engineering
- Language: English
- Edited by: Nelson Fumo

Publication details
- History: 2019-present
- Publisher: Elsevier
- Frequency: 4 per year
- Open access: Yes
- License: CC BY-NC-ND 3.0
- Impact factor: 1.65 (2021)

Standard abbreviations
- ISO 4: eTransportation

Indexing
- ISSN: 2590-1168
- OCLC no.: 1084327405

Links
- Journal homepage; Online access; Online archive

eTransportation is a peer-reviewed open-access scientific journal covering all modes of transportation by using electricity (vehicles, ships and airplanes). The journal was established in 2019 and is published by Elsevier. The editor-in-chief is Minggao Ouyang (Tsinghua University). It is emphasized that efforts to advocate UN's goals of sustainable development are welcomed, specifically "Affordable and clean energy".

== Abstracting and indexing ==
The journal is abstracted and indexed in Ei Compendex, Scopus, and the Science Citation Index Expanded. According to the Journal Citation Reports, the journal has a 2021 impact factor of 1.65.
