= Governors Highway Safety Association =

GHSA, the Governors Highway Safety Association is a non-profit organization located in Washington, D.C. Its members are the state highway safety offices of the 50 states, U.S. territories, and the Indian Nations. These offices administer federal funding for behavioral highway safety programs promoting safe driving, such as Click It or Ticket and 'Drunk Driving. Over the Limit. Under Arrest.'

In 1966, Congress passed the Highway Safety Act. Section 402 of this act set up the structure of state highway safety programs to be administered by the designee of each governor. The following year, these governors' representatives organized to form The National Conference of Governors' Highway Representatives. The organization's name changed in 2002 to the Governors Highway Safety Association. State highway safety programs are regulated by the National Highway Traffic Safety Administration, a branch of the U.S. Department of Transportation.

GHSA tracks information on current state highway safety laws, including cell phone and text messaging restrictions, seat belt laws, and drunk driving penalties. When analyzing road safety, it looks to "whether states have enacted proven safety enhancements such as motorcycle helmet laws and primary seat belt laws, which allow police to stop motorists solely for being unbuckled."

== See also ==
- National Child Passenger Safety Board
