= CN Serial Number =

Serial number system used in China

A CN Serial Number (CN; Chinese: 国内统一连续出版物号, also commonly known as Chinese: 国内统一刊号; lit. 'Domestic Standard Serial Number') is a serial number given by the National Press and Publication Administration used to uniquely identify a serial publication published in China.

== Code format ==
A CN Serial Number starts with "CN", followed by 1 space, 2 digits of administrative code, 1 hyphen "-", 4 digits of serial number, 1 slash "/" and not more than 3 digits of the publication under the Chinese Library Classification. Each serial publication is assigned a different number for each different media in which it is distributed. When a publication changes its title or is relocated to another provincial administrative region, it is necessary to apply for a new issue number in the new provincial administrative region.

Code format
C	N	A	A	-	B	B	B	B	/	C	C	C
Prefix		Administrative division code			Serial number within the administrative division					Additional code under the Chinese Library Classification		

The definitions of the digits in the issue number are as follows:

- Prefix: "CN" is the ISO 3166-1 code for China.
- Administrative division code: two digits, corresponding to the publication in the People's Republic of China in the administrative division of the corresponding provincial administrative code. Considering that there are more newspapers and magazines in some places, only one code will be insufficient, Beijing is additionally assigned with codes "09" and "10", and Shanghai is additionally assigned with code "30". The military system is the same, with additional code "81".
- Serial number within the administrative division: four digits representing the serial number of the periodical within the corresponding provincial administrative division. Specifically, 0001-0999 are assigned to print newspapers, 1000–5999 to print periodicals, 6000–8999 to web-based serial publications (web-based newspapers and web-based periodicals), and 9000–9999 to serialized electronic publications (including e-newspapers and e-journals).
- Additional code under the Chinese Library Classification: No more than three letters and figures that is the classification number under the Chinese Library Classification, this additional code is not applicable to most newspapers; (Note: Some journals also do not have classification numbers.) some journals publishing in both Chinese and minority language use the same issue number and are additionally labeled with the Hanyu Pinyin initials of the language of publication. Besides, the suffix "（J）" and "（G）" (Note: Must be full-width parentheses in this case.) are appended to military newspapers and university newspapers, respectively.

== See also ==
- ISSN
