= Transportation Research Board =

Group based in Washington, United States

- Abbreviation: TRB
- Formation: 1920; 106 years ago
- Type: NGO
- Headquarters: 500 Fifth Street NW; Washington, DC 20001
- Coordinates: 38°53′48″N 77°01′10″W
- Executive Director: Victoria Sheehan
- Parent organization: National Academies of Sciences, Engineering, and Medicine
- Website: www.trb.org
- Formerly called: National Advisory Board on Highway Research (1920-1925); Highway Research Board (1925-1974)

The Transportation Research Board (TRB) is a division of the U.S. National Academies of Sciences, Engineering, and Medicine (NASEM). TRB's mission is to mobilize expertise, experience, and knowledge to anticipate and solve complex transportation-related challenges. Committees, researchers, and staff are focused on advancing resilient infrastructure, exploring transformative technologies, and protecting the public’s health and safety. The board publishes research via four cooperative research programs and through consensus studies, which may be requested by the U.S. Congress.

As one of seven major divisions of the NASEM, TRB research is objective and interdisciplinary. TRB hosts nearly 200 standing technical committees that address specific aspects of transportation, and the TRB Annual Meeting attracts thousands of transportation professionals.

== History ==
The Transportation Research Board was established in 1920 as the "National Advisory Board on Highway Research" and changed its name to the "Highway Research Board" from 1925 until 1974, when it was renamed again as the "Transportation Research Board." It has commissioned ad hoc research since 1950, become more involved in multimodal transport in the 1960s, and continues to research across various transportation modes.

== Activities and organization ==
TRB's varied activities annually draw on over 8,000 engineers, planners, scientists, academics, and other transportation researchers from the public and private sectors, who volunteer expertise in the public interest by participating on TRB committees, panels, and task forces.

TRB hosts its annual meeting in Washington DC every January, gathering approximately 14,000 transportation professionals from across the United States and around the world.

At the 2025 TRB Annual Meeting, Nuria Fernandez was presented with the Frank Turner Medal for Lifetime Achievement in Transportation.

== Publications and databases ==
Publications include the Highway Capacity Manual, the Transportation Research Record: Journal of the Transportation Research Board (TRR) which publishes peer-reviewed papers, and a bi-monthly magazine called TR News. A history of transportation research and of TRB was published in January 2020 called The Transportation Research Board, 1920–2020: Everyone Interested Is Invited.

Transportation Research Information Services (TRIS) offers several databases for researchers:

- The TRID Database is an integrated database that combines the records from TRB's Transportation Research Information Services (TRIS) Database and the OECD's Joint Transport Research Centre's International Transport Research Documentation (ITRD) Database.
- The Research in Progress (RiP) Database contains transportation research projects, mostly those funded by the modal administrations of the U.S. Department of Transportation, state DOTs, University Transportation Centers, or by TRB's cooperative research programs.
- TRB Technical Activities standing committees identify, develop, and disseminate research need statements (RNS) for use by practitioners, researchers, and others in a Research Needs Statements Database.
- The TRB Publications Index (Pubsindex) contains bibliographic information on almost 48,000 papers, articles, and reports published by the Highway Research Board, Transportation Research Board, Strategic Highway Research Program, and the Marine Board.

== Funding ==
Although many activities are requested and funded by Congress and federal agencies, TRB and the National Academies do not receive direct federal appropriations. Programs receive support from state transportation departments, the various administrations of the U.S. Department of Transportation, and other federal agencies, industry associations, and other organizations and individuals interested in the development of transportation.

The Cooperative Research Programs receive funding. The Behavioral Traffic Safety Cooperative Research Program (BTSCRP) facilitates projects with support from the Governors Highway Safety Association. The Airport Cooperative Research Program (ACRP) is sponsored by the Federal Aviation Administration. The National Cooperative Highway Research Program (NCHRP), created in 1962, is sponsored by individual state departments of transportation of the American Association of State Highway and Transportation Officials and the Federal Highway Administration. The Transit Cooperative Research Program (TCRP) is sponsored by the Federal Transit Administration and carried out under a three-way agreement among the National Academy of Sciences, the Transit Development Corporation, Inc., and the American Public Transportation Association.

TRB offers selective research funding through the NCHRP, ACRP, and TCRP. Each of these programs has industry leaders who serve as references during the project.

== See also ==
- National Cooperative Highway Research Program
- World Conference on Transport Research Society
- Transportation safety in the United States
