= Logbook =

Book for recording activities

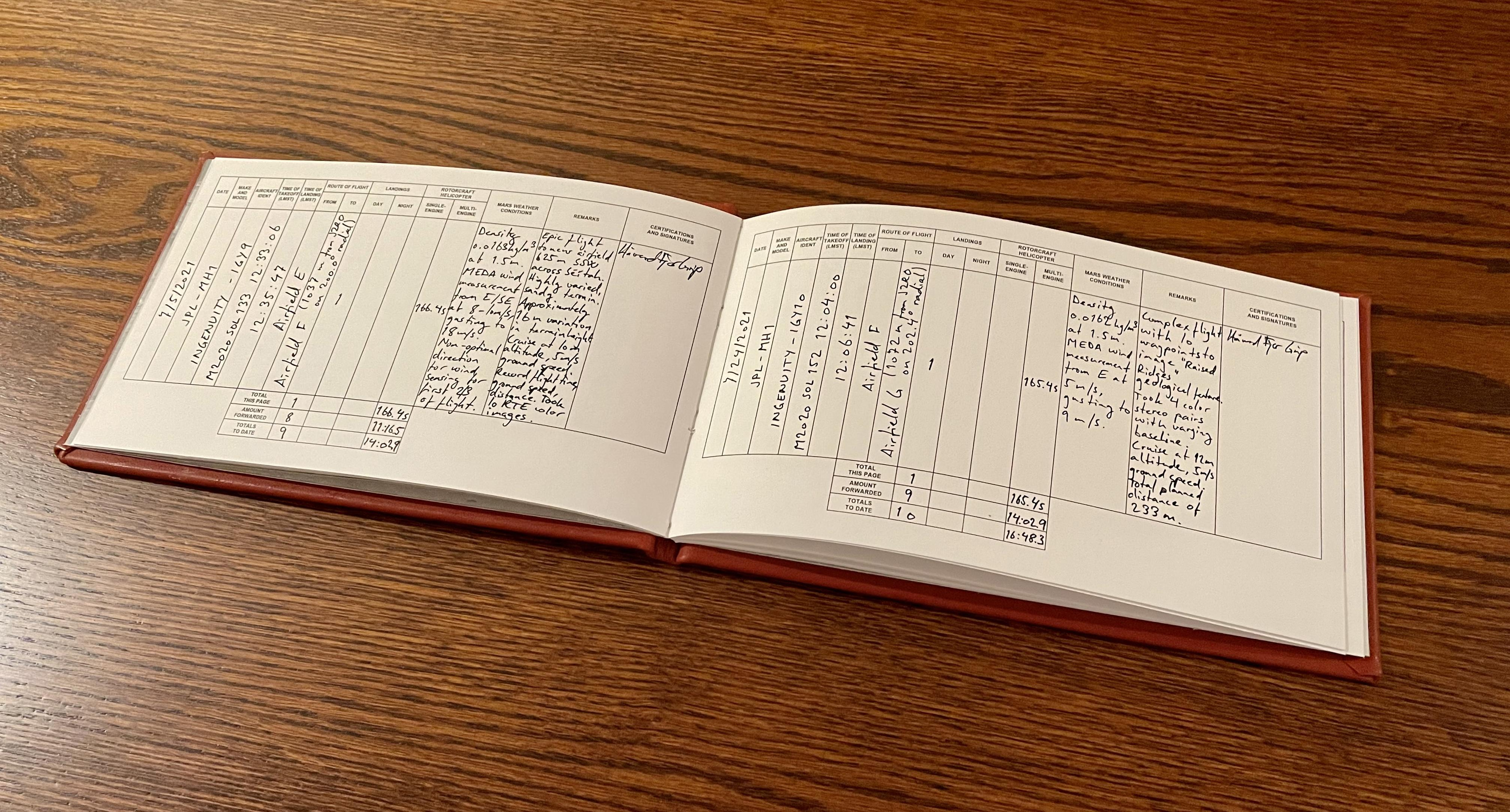
Logbook used for NASA's Mars Ingenuity helicopter

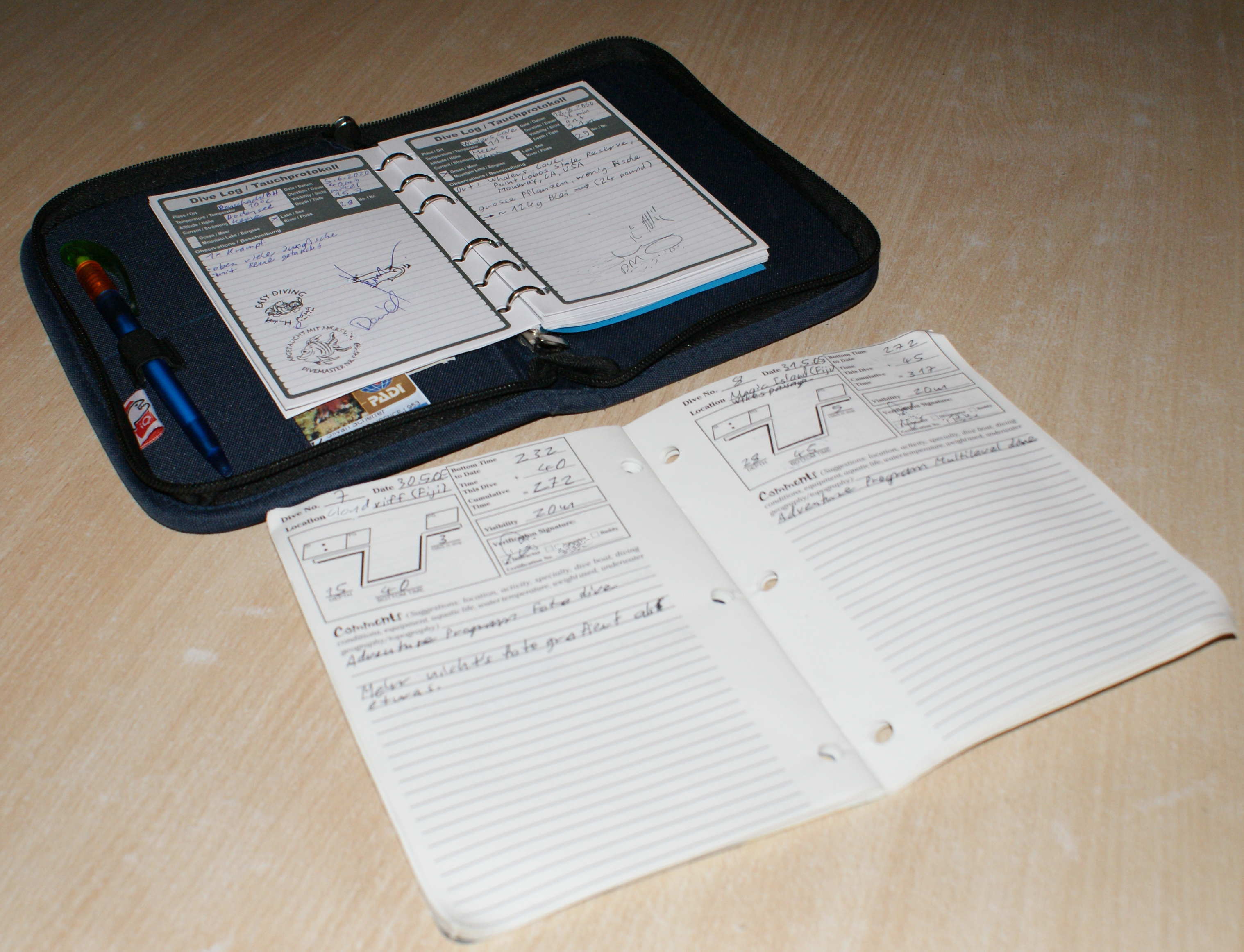
Two different logbooks for scuba divers.

A logbook (or log book) is a record used to record states, events, or conditions applicable to complex machines or the personnel who operate them. Logbooks are commonly associated with the operation of aircraft, nuclear plants, particle accelerators, and ships (among other applications).

The term logbook originated with the ship's log, a maritime record of important events in the management, operation, and navigation of a ship. The captain was responsible for keeping a log, as a minimum, of navigational wind, speed, direction and position.

== Format ==
Logbooks come in many varieties, but they are sometimes standardized in form and/or content within certain organizations or industries. In some applications like flight training or trucking hours of service, they contain specific information used to satisfy legal requirements.

=== Electronic logbooks ===
Prior to the advent of mobile computing, logbooks were almost exclusively printed and bound in hard copy form. While physical logbooks offer advantages in frontline applications with many users (like aircraft maintenance logs), the proliferation of cloud computing and mobile devices has enabled the development of electronic logbooks. They may be as complex as software packages, or as simple as editable spreadsheets, but electronic logbooks offer several advantages including virtually unlimited capacity and digital backups.

== Applications ==
=== Maritime logbooks ===
To record key navigation, engine watch, port calls and other operational activities on board vessels of all sizes, marine logbooks must meet the specific reporting requirements of IMO, SOLAS and flag states. When maritime logbooks are of the electronic variety, manually-inserted information is normally combined with data recorded from the vessel's instruments such as time and position. Typical marine logbooks are:

- Deck logbook – Records navigational events related to the voyage and operations on board
- Dynamic positioning logbook – Manual recording of operations related to Dynamic Positioning (DP) operations
- Engine logbook – Records engine events related to the engine and machinery operation
- Oil record book – Records events related to oil and dirty water as required by IMO's MARPOL convention
- Operational log – Records events related to vessel operation, i.e. performance, cargo handling and maritime operations. The Operational Log will typically need some customization to owner's requirement and trade.
- Port or harbor logbook – Records incoming and outgoing vessels at a port
- Radio logbook – Records events relevant to radio traffic as required by IMO and the flag states

The maritime industry is increasingly adopting digital logbooks to replace traditional paper-based records, aiming to enhance operational efficiency, ensure compliance with international regulations, and improve data accuracy. A significant development in this field is the creation of ISO 4891: Ships and Marine Technology – Interoperability of Smart Applications for Ships. This standard establishes a framework for the seamless integration of smart applications on vessels, facilitating efficient communication and data exchange between various systems. The standard was developed through a collaboration between DIN, the German Institute for Standardization, and the Japan Ship Technology Research Association and several reputed stakeholders of the maritime industry. The adoption of digital logbooks and the establishment of interoperability standards like ISO 4891 reflect a broader trend towards digital transformation in maritime operations, promoting safer, more efficient, and sustainable shipping practices.

=== Shift logbooks ===
On any industrial site, there is a continuous stream of operational, maintenance and safety events occurring at all levels and areas within the process. An electronic shift logbook is used at power plants and in process industry where several shift teams cooperate in maintaining production. Typically the electronic shift logbook is used to record state at the production plant, but it can also contain simple planning functions that notify personnel about upcoming maintenance activities. Compared to the paper logbook the electronic shift logbook enhance the value of the gathered information through;

- Search functions
- Defined plant hierarchy for registration of logbook entries
- Classification according to certain entry types
- Statistics about most problematic areas
- Management reports

Additionally, access to the information storage can be controlled through user authentication and authorizations mechanisms.

=== Manufacturing logbooks ===
Logbooks have been promoted within manufacturing for reasons including:

- Inventory and process analysis/management
- Quality control
- Maintenance management
- Regulatory and legal compliance where applicable

=== Other applications ===
It has since been applied to a variety of other uses, including:

- Aircraft pilots must maintain a pilot logbook to record their time spent flying and in a simulator. In addition, aircraft operators must maintain an aircraft technical logbook (or "tech logs") recording the aircraft's flights, maintenance and defects.
- In a project, a logbook is a recording which is compiled while it is being done may be called a project diary. In the PRINCE2 project management framework, daily logs are used to record issues, actions or events not caught by other types of registers or logs within the framework. Examples of other logs or registers in PRINCE2 include the lessons log, risk register, issue register, quality register or backlog.
- In skydiving, a logbook serves as a parachutist's personal history in the sport and also serves as an identifying document. It also provides drop zones proof to back one's skydiving licenses, ratings and currency.
- In scuba diving, the dive log documents the experience of a diver by logging a diver's dives.
- In the fishing industry, a logbook is used to record catch data as part of the fisheries regulations. It is then submitted to the fishing authorities of the vessel's flag state.
- For amateur radio, the logbook is where the hams register their contacts and other radio operations. There are several programs to help radio operators in the management of their logbook.
- For commercial vehicles: In Australia, Canada, the United States, New Zealand and other countries, a logbook is used to register driver and operator work time for commercial heavy vehicles. In the United States hours of service are recorded in a logbook. In New Zealand it is referred to as work-time.
- In the United Kingdom, a vehicle registration certificate (V5C) and service history is often referred to as a "logbook".
- A race car log book is a document certifying that a car is prepared to a given set of rules and is safe for competitions.
- Lab notebooks and electronic lab notebooks are used in research and scientific settings.

== See also ==
- Inventor's notebook
- Logging (computing)
- Service book (disambiguation)
- Timesheet
