= XRS Corporation =

- Formerly: Xata Corporation
- Traded as: Nasdaq: XRSC
- Industry: Trucking
- Founded: 1 January 1985
- Defunct: November 2, 2014
- Fate: Acquired by Omnitracs, LLC
- Headquarters: Eden Prairie, United States
- Website: xrscorp.com

XRS Corporation (NASDAQ: XRSC) (formerly XATA Corporation; NASDAQ: XATA) provided on-demand software and services to the trucking industry. Based in Eden Prairie, Minn., XRS's software solutions and services delivered data on vehicle and driver performance. Fleet managers, dispatchers and drivers collect, sort, view and analyze the data to improve savings, safety and regulatory compliance. Xata was the first company to introduce electronic driver logs and exception-based management reporting. Its fleet operations management systems have been installed on more than 100,000 commercial trucks at more than 2,000 customer locations. Its products helped fleet managers and drivers meet established and emerging electronic on-board recorder (EOBR) regulations from the Federal Motor Carrier Safety Administration. It was acquired by Omnitracs on November 2, 2014.

== History ==
On August 4, 2004, XATA Corporation restated its financial results for the third fiscal quarter ended June 30, 2004, to revise the accounting treatment of its Series B Preferred Stock dividends.

On April 7, 2009, XRS Corporation was sued among some other defendants over patent infringement.

In 2010, XRS earned the rank of 363 on the Technology Fast 500(TM) list, which is Deloitte LLP's ranking of 500 of the fastest growing technology, media, telecommunications, life sciences and clean technology companies in North America. The Minnesota High Tech Association (MHTA), in partnership with Enterprise Minnesota and LifeScience Alley, named Xata Corporation as the recipient of the 2009 Tekne Award in the Technology Services award category.

On August 13, 2012, during the Xata User Event (XUE) in Minneapolis the company announced both a change from their former name "XATA Corporation" and the introduction of an all-mobile platform for trucking compliance, performance and fleet optimization.

On November 2, 2014, XRS Corporation was acquired by Omnitracs.

== Products ==
=== XataNet ===
A "full fleet" tracking product for private and for-hire fleets.

=== Turnpike ===
Software that ran on drivers’ existing cell phones, smartphones and tablet computers.

=== Others ===
- RouteTracker
- Speed Management
