= Electronic on-board recorder =

Electronic device used to track the time a vehicle is being driven

An electronic on-board recorder (EOBR) is an electronic device attached to a commercial motor vehicle, which is used to record the amount of time a vehicle is being driven. This is similar to the tachograph, and is the American equivalent of the digital tachograph used in Europe. Trucks in the European Union are required to have digital tachographs installed, and are securely monitored by government agencies. However, in Europe, the new digital tachograph which is considered secure, can be tricked with a round magnet placed by drivers over the connection to the transmission box. Usually they tie a rope to that magnet, and with a simple pull, the magnet will disengage and will show that the driver started moving about half an hour ago (or whatever time the driver wants to set by stopping in a rest area after a sleeping period, and place the magnet on). The majority of carriers and drivers in the United States currently use paper-based log books. On January 31, 2011, the U.S. Federal Motor Carrier Safety Administration (FMCSA) proposed a rule requiring Electronic On-Board Recorders for interstate commercial truck and bus companies. The proposed rule covers interstate carriers that currently use log books to record driver's hours of service. The proposal would affect more than 500,000 carriers in the United States and carriers that currently use time cards would be exempt.

The only mandatory EOBR use is for companies with a poor compliance record that is slated to go into effect in June, 2012. On August 26, 2011, in a lawsuit brought by the Owner–Operator Independent Drivers Association (OOIDA), the 7th U.S. Circuit Court of Appeals vacated and remanded the rule back to the agency for further proceedings. According to Robert Digges, the American Trucking Associations (ATA) chief counsel, "Although the court decision specifically addresses the 2010 final rule, FMCSA also will also likely have to bring into compliance its Jan. 31 proposed rule mandating that nearly all motor carriers equip their trucks with EOBRs". This does not mean the FMCSA will suspend attempts to pass regulations regarding mandatory EOBR's but will mean delays in implementation of any rules.

The driving hours of commercial drivers (truck and bus drivers) are regulated by a set of rules known as the hours of service (HOS) The HOS are rules intended to prevent driver fatigue, by limiting the amount of time drivers spend operating commercial vehicles. The amount of time available under the HOS rules to operate a commercial motor vehicle depends, in part, upon how much time the driver both performs work or obtains rest when not driving. In order for an EOBR to accurately record and report a driver's compliance with the HOS rules, therefore, whenever the truck is not being operated the driver must manually input to the EOBR whether he or she is still on-duty (working - i.e. unloading the truck, inspecting or repairing the truck, filling out paperwork...etc.) or off-duty (not working). EOBRs do not automatically record changes in non-driving duty status and, therefore, is somewhat similar to paper logs being that it is only accurate while the truck is in motion. Companies are now offering extra on board components that can accurately record the amount of rest time a driver spends in the sleeper berth and electronically monitor hours a driver spends at rest or while sleeping.

Electronic Logging Devices (ELDs) is the most recent term to define an electronic device that is capable of recording a driver's driving hours and duty status automatically. In order to be considered an ELD, the device must meet specific technology requirements and be included on the Federal Motor Carrier Safety Administration's (FMCSA) registration site.

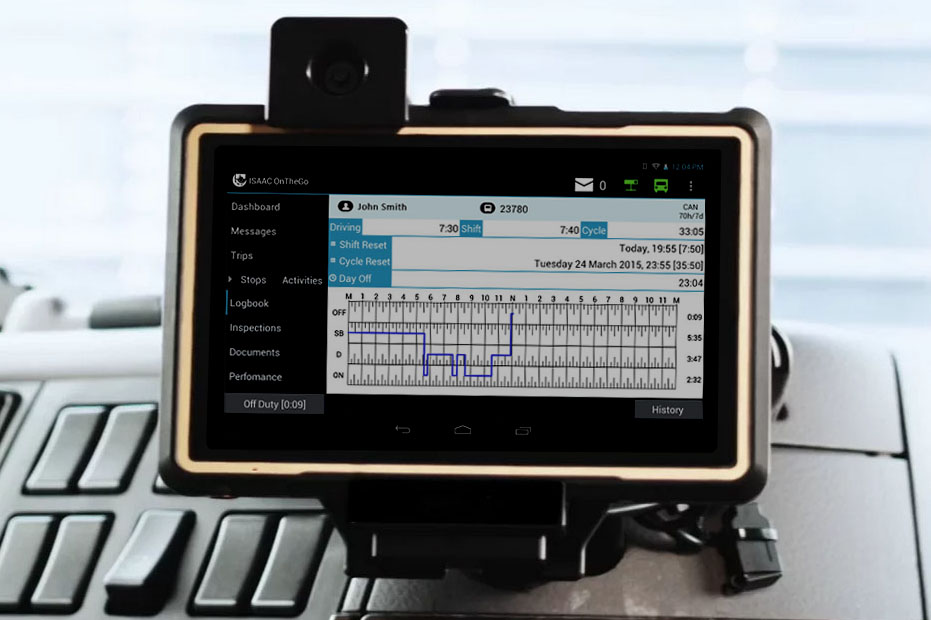
ISAAC InControl EOBR Model August 2015

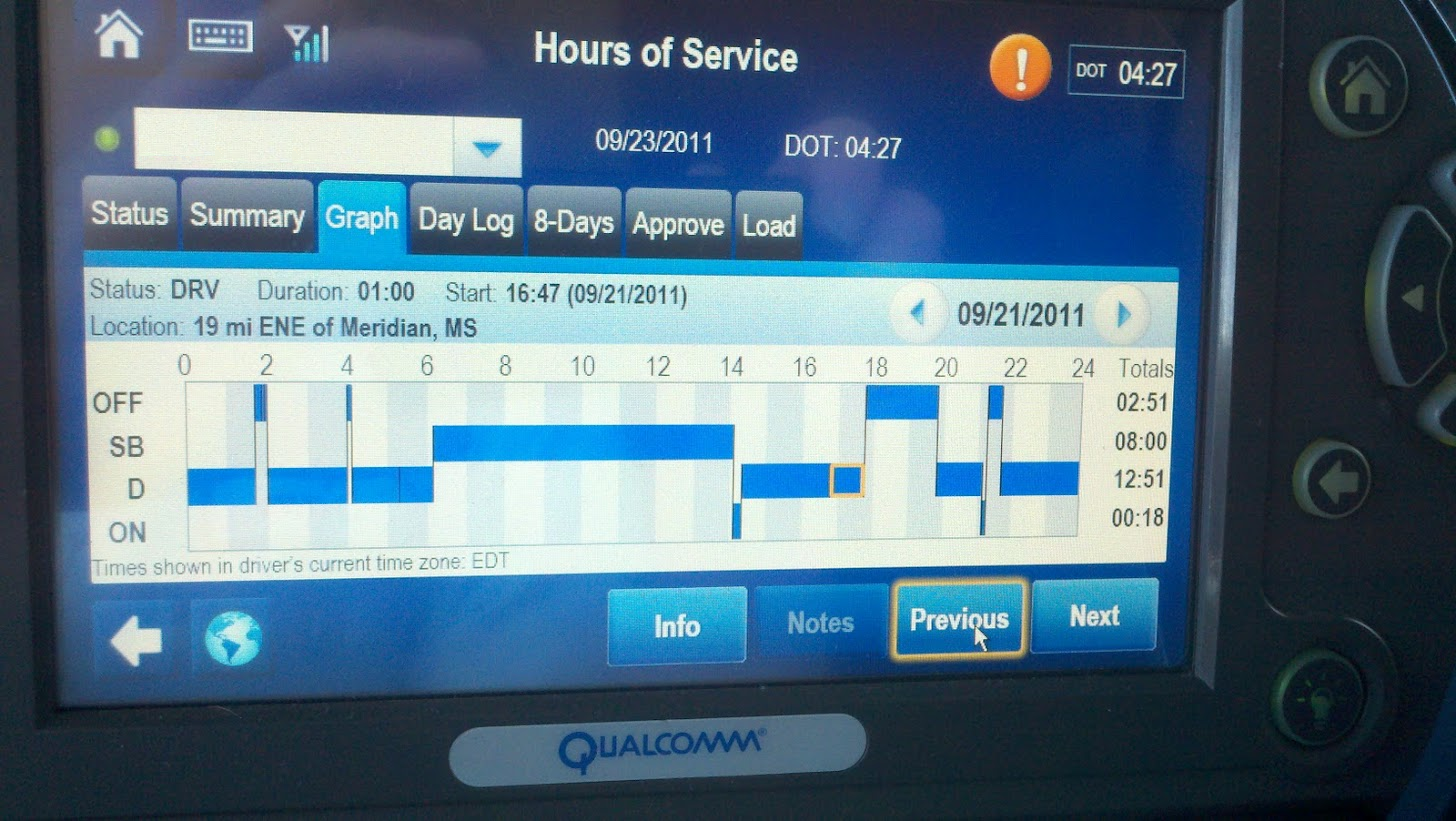
Qualcomm EOBR model MCP110 September 2011

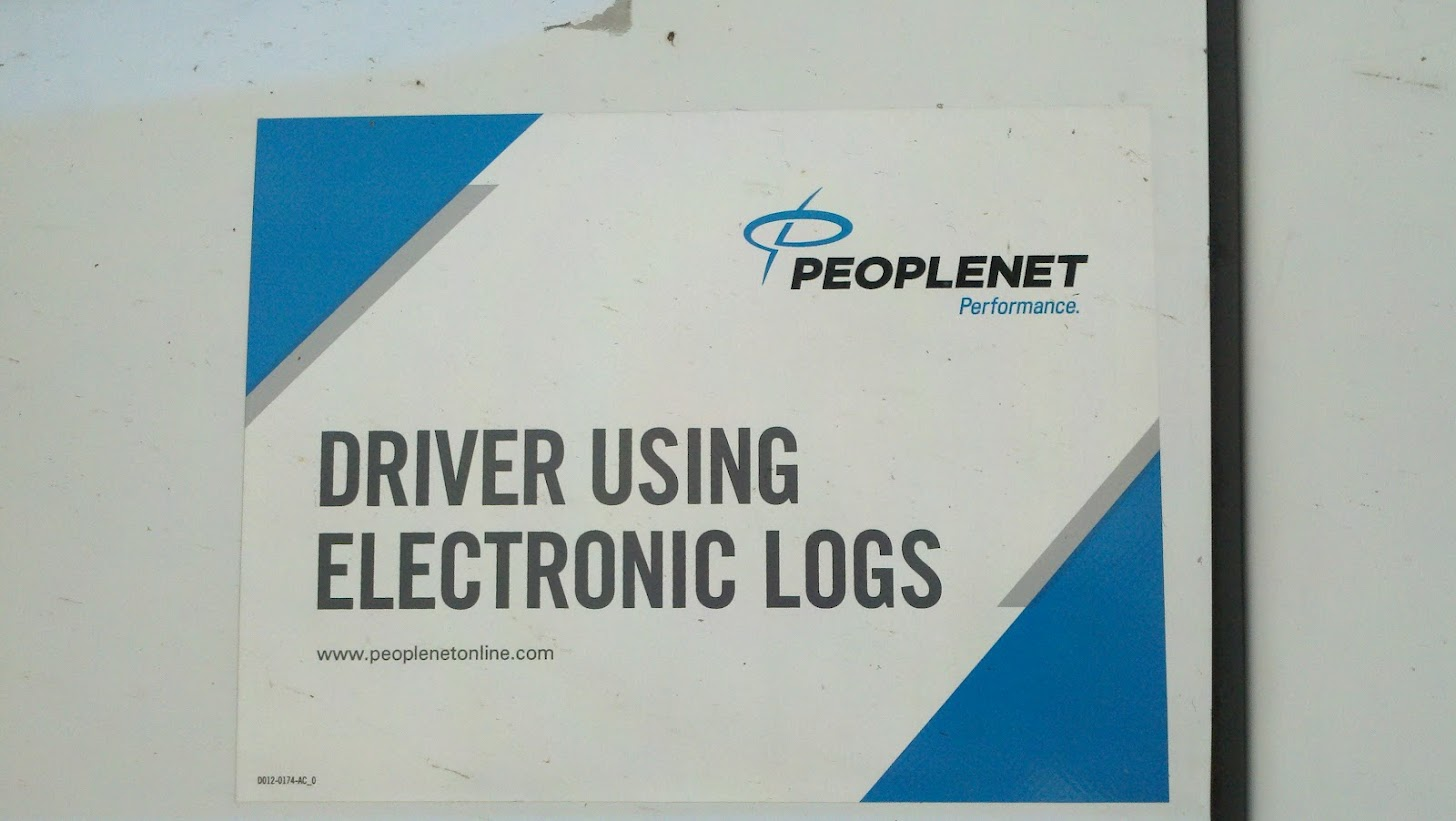
EOBR sticker on truck
