= GPSoverIP =

Technology for transmitting geocoordinates

- Developed by: GPSoverIP GmbH
- Introduced: 1998
- Industry: Cellular network
- Website: https://www.gpsoverip.de

GPSoverIP is a proprietary protocol for transmitting geocoordinates of moving objects to the internet. It is a very lean and narrow technology which can be used even in areas where the GSM network bandwidth is no longer sufficient for other transmission paths. The only requirement is a functioning GSM mobile phone network.

== History ==
The GPSoverIP technology was developed by the GPSoverIP GmbH, a spin-off of the Netzwerk GmbH. In 1998, the desire for a solution for the uninterrupted transmission of the geo-positions of vehicles in short intervals to the internet led to an increased focus on the then still young field of expertise. So-called standardized transport protocols (Transport Control Protocol, TCP) are frequently used for the wireless transmission of GPS data of moving objects on the internet. These are universal and data-intensive protocols designed for the wired internet. Their original purpose is to transfer data over the wired internet. Therefore, they are only partially suitable for the transmission of GPS data of moving objects on the internet. On the one hand, this is due to the size of the overheads, a complex and data-intensive confirmation procedure, the sending of unused layers (identification, flags, version, header, checksum, etc.); on the other hand, the fluctuating quality of the bandwidths in the networks of mobile network operators represents a considerable hurdle for the TCP/IP transport protocol. It can no longer be used if the bandwidth is too low. This leads to interruptions during the transmission.

For these reasons, GPSoverIP was developed to improve the systems' performance and is specially adapted to the specific requirements of the mobile internet. The technology was completed and successfully tested in 2004. The patent was filed in the same year. In 2005 GPSoverIP GmbH was established as an independent company on the market and the first product working with the protocol was launched. The protocol is established in the OEM area. The technology is used by equipment manufacturers as well as by institutions such as Deutsche Bahn.

The transmission technology GPSoverIP has been accompanied by another protocol since 2006: DATAoverIP. This is based on the same basic approach to meet the special requirements of the mobile internet. The task of DATAoverIP is to transfer data of different formats to the mobile internet. The background of this development was to transfer not only the GPS position but also other data for general communication (texts, pictures, etc.) as well as vehicle-specific data (FMS/CAN bus, RFID, digital tachographs, etc.).

== Functionality ==
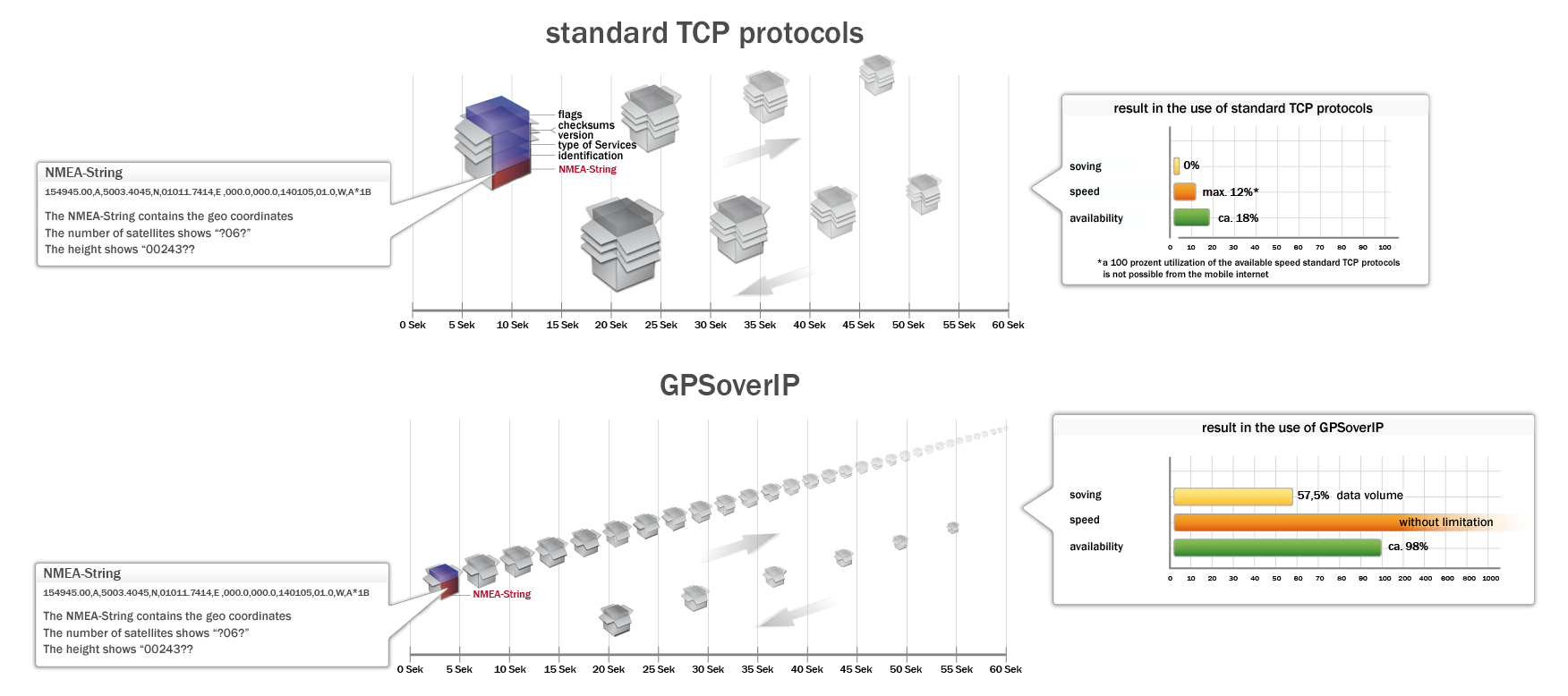
Comparison of GPSoverIP and TCP

Many systems use the TCP/IP transport protocol for the wireless transmission of GPS data of moving objects on the internet. TCP/IP is a universal transport protocol, which was designed for a wired internet. Its task is to transmit data on the internet, such as texts, sound, photos, or videos. However, it is not suitable for the transmission of GPS data of moving objects on the mobile internet. On the one hand, this is due to the size of its overhead, an elaborate and data-intensive confirmation procedure, the sending of unused layers, and on the other hand, the fluctuating bandwidth quality in the networks of mobile network operators also represents a major hurdle for the TCP/IP transport protocol.

GPSoverIP, which was developed specifically for data transmission in the mobile internet, compensates for the problems caused by TCP/IP. It does not contain any unused layers and is, including GPS and user data (longitude, latitude, direction, altitude, delivery time, speed, number of satellites, checksum, as well as backup and user data), many times smaller than a standard TCP/IP packet without any data. Thus GPSoverIP works stable even with fluctuating bandwidth quality in contrast to TCP/IP. Besides, it avoids overloaded headers and works with its confirmation procedure. The optimal header responsible for a fast and secure transmission is achieved when the GPS frame only needs one packet. This is the case with GPSoverIP.

With GPSoverIP, positions can be transmitted in short intervals, allowing much better visualization of vehicle movement; this is referred to as live positioning. Data sets generated by GPSoverIP are more accurate because there are hardly any data breaks, and GPS transmission errors are corrected immediately at GD-GATE. Based on these data sets, analyses, evaluations, or logbooks can be created reliably. GPSoverIP is a telematics protocol with which fleet control is possible. Compared with conventional methods, the package sizes for transmission are approx. only one-tenth as big. The GPS coordinates can be transmitted using the push method.

A GPSoverIP system always consists of a device with an integrated receiver and transmitter for geo-coordinates and user data. It sends its data via the proprietary GPSoverIP protocol to a gateway that works on the FIFO principle. From there, the GPSoverIP web service provides this information via the real-time API interface for query by GIS applications. The GPSoverIP protocol operates on OSI layers 3 and 4, while OSI layers 5 to 7 are available to any application developer with a defined interface to the GPSoverIP protocol.

== Applications ==
There is a wide range of users for the use of GPSoverIP. The possibilities to implement this geodata in the software are diverse. The stability and maintenance of this internet-based service have priority. The live display and access to historical data can be done in any software based on the open interface (API) of GPSoverIP. The description of the API with validated interfaces is available to every developer free of charge. Thus, the data generated by GPSoverIP can be integrated into already existing software solutions, such as merchandise management programs.

Companies such as Porsche, Toyota, BMW, Mercedes, Deutsche Bahn, Navigon, Deutsche Messe, Audi, Rohde & Schwarz, Deutsche Telekom and Putzmeister, as well as associations such as the ADAC all currently use GPSoverIP protocol and related technologies.

== Patent ==
- DE 02007001710A1 "Method for Loading Means of Transport With Persons and/or Goods to Be Transported and Associated System"

== Awards ==
- 2016: Mittelstandsunion Innovation Award
- 2018/2020: German Telematics Award
