= Motor carrier safety rating =

US interstate commercial motor carrier evaluation

The motor carrier safety rating is an evaluation given to an interstate commercial motor carrier (a company which employs truck or bus drivers) by the Federal Motor Carrier Safety Administration (FMCSA).

A safety rating is determined by a compliance review, an on-site examination of motor carrier operations, such as drivers' hours of service, maintenance and inspection, driver qualification, commercial drivers' license requirements, financial responsibility, accidents, hazardous materials, and other safety and transportation records to determine whether a motor carrier meets the safety fitness standard. A compliance review may be conducted in response to a request to change a safety rating, to investigate potential violations of safety regulations by motor carriers, or to investigate complaints, or other evidence of safety violations. The compliance review may result in the initiation of an enforcement action.

One of three safety ratings will be issued following a compliance review:

Satisfactory - A Satisfactory rating means that a motor carrier has in place and functioning adequate safety management controls to meet the safety fitness standard prescribed in §385.5 of the Federal Motor Carrier Safety Regulations (FMCSR). Safety management controls are adequate if they are appropriate for the size and type of operation of the particular motor carrier.

Conditional - This rating means a motor carrier does not have adequate safety management controls in place to ensure compliance with the safety fitness standard found in §385.5 of the FMCSR.

Unsatisfactory - An Unsatisfactory rating means a motor carrier does not have adequate safety management controls in place to ensure compliance with the safety fitness standard which has resulted in occurrences listed in §385.5 (a) through (k)of the FMCSR.

Generally, a motor carrier rated unsatisfactory is prohibited from operating a CMV. If a proposed unsatisfactory safety rating becomes final, the FMCSA will issue an order placing its interstate operations out of service. Any motor carrier that operates CMVs in violation of this section will be subject to the penalty provisions listed in 49 U.S.C. 521(b).

'What you can do: - All companies have a window after an audit where they can appeal the decision by proving they made an effort to improve their situation. This can include doing an entire company overhaul, replacing management, or hiring a reputable consultant to be on retainer for future incidents.

== Records requests ==
A carrier's current safety rating can be found on safer.fmcsa.dot.gov. The Safety and Fitness Electronic Records (SAFER) System offers company safety data to industry and the public over the internet. Data from the SAFER website is pulled from the Motor Carrier Management Information System, a database administered by the FMCSA.

MCMIS contains information on the safety fitness of commercial motor carriers and hazardous material (HM) shippers subject to the Federal Motor Carrier Safety Regulations and the Hazardous Materials Regulations.

A number of reports are available from the MCMIS. Anyone may request these reports for a fee, however, a "Company Snapshot" is available to the public, free of charge. This information includes:

- Carrier Legal Name/Doing Business As (DBA) Name
- Complete Address (Physical/Mailing)
- US Department of Transportation (DOT) Number
- Carrier Operation (e.g. Private/For Hire)
- Cargo(s) Carried
- Hazardous Material(s) Carried
- Fleet Size
- Number of Drivers
- Total Crashes
- Number of Fatalities/Injuries/Disabled Vehicles
- Total Inspections
- Number of Violations for Drivers/Vehicles
- Safety Rating

== Criticism of the effectiveness of motor carrier safety ratings ==
The audit activity and the resultant motor carrier safety rating has been criticized for being imperfect, and perhaps misleading. Studies have shown that for a considerable number of audit items, correlation coefficients between audit item outcome and actual safety performance have counter-intuitive signs: the better the compliance rating of firms, the worse their accident rates. Some elements of the audit are important predictors of actual safety performance, in particular questions concerning if a safety director is appointed, and background checks on new drivers. Nevertheless, "the overall conclusion is that the worse a firm does on a large part of the audit, the worse its accident record".

== See also ==
- Federal Motor Carrier Safety Administration
