= Electronic logging device =

Device for recording driving hours of a vehicle

An electronic logging device (ELD or E-Log) is a piece of electronic hardware attached to a commercial motor vehicle engine to record driving hours. The driving hours of commercial drivers (truck and bus drivers) are typically regulated by a set of rules known as the hours of service (HOS) in the United States and as drivers' working hours in Europe. The Commercial Vehicle Driver Hours of Service Regulations vary in Canada and the United States.

An ELD monitors a vehicle’s engine to capture data on whether the engine is running, whether the vehicle is moving, distance driven, and duration of engine operation.

An ELD in trucking can record the following data to keep track of duty status and assist drivers in also tracking their driving limits to avoid fatigue related issues

- Date
- Time
- Location
- Engine hours
- Vehicle miles
- Driver identification
- User authentication
- Vehicle
- Motor carrier

AOBRD (Automatic On-Board Recording Device) was the first in history with an appearance in 1988. Then came the paper logs or electronic on-board recorders (EOBR) were used for hours of service tracking. While recorder logs improve the accuracy of the data, the lack of a consistent data format meant that the logs needed to be regenerated to an equivalent hardware ("paper") format for review and enforcement. The Record of Duty Status (RoDS) definition within the ELD legislation provides a consistent format for enforcement personnel to review, so the ELD Mandate was created.

== United States ==
The Federal Motor Carrier Safety Administration (FMCSA) published its final rule on electronic logging devices on December 16, 2015. The rule required most drivers who must keep records of duty status (RODS) to use an ELD from December 18, 2017; carriers that had installed automatic on-board recording devices (AOBRDs) before that date could continue to use them until December 16, 2019.

Several groups are exempt from the ELD requirement but must still keep RODS: drivers operating under the short-haul timecard exception, drivers who keep RODS on no more than 8 days in any 30-day period, driveaway-towaway operations in which the vehicle being driven is the commodity being delivered, and drivers of vehicles manufactured before model year 2000. The rule also prohibits motor carriers from using ELDs to harass drivers, and limits the number of supporting documents carriers must keep to eight per 24-hour period.

ELD providers self-certify that their devices meet FMCSA's technical specifications, and carriers may only use devices on FMCSA's list of registered ELDs. FMCSA removes devices from the list when it finds they do not meet the requirements; carriers using a revoked device have 60 days to replace it, after which drivers can be cited for operating without an ELD.

Before the final rule of the ELD mandate was announced, fleets used the Automatic On-Board Recording Device (AOBRD), a much simpler version of the ELD device that did not provide fleets with many features. For instance, ELDs provide a standardized format and transfer process for roadside inspections, have more sophisticated location tracking, and enable drivers to accept or reject edits made to their driving logs – all of which are required under the ELD mandate.
