= Hours of service =

U.S. commercial motor vehicle driver working and rest period restrictions

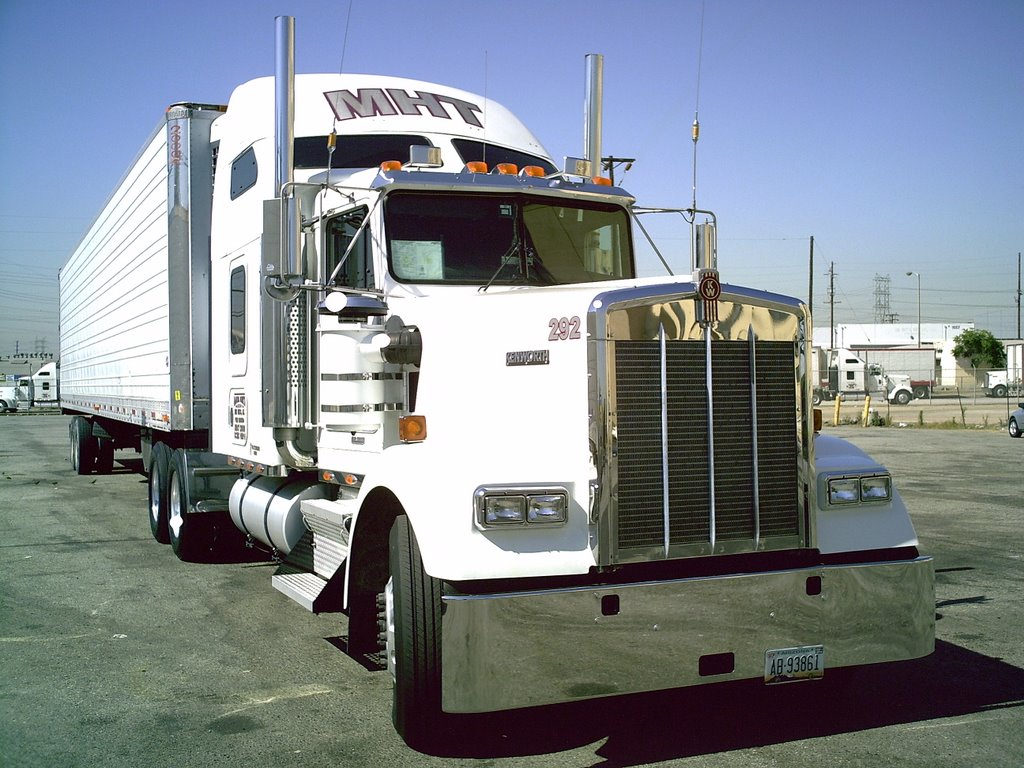
The hours of service limit the driving hours of truck drivers and bus drivers.

Hours of service (HOS) regulations are issued by the Federal Motor Carrier Safety Administration (FMCSA) and govern the working hours of anyone operating a commercial motor vehicle (CMV) in the United States. These regulations apply to truck drivers, commercial and intercity bus drivers, and school bus drivers who operate CMVs. These rules limit the number of daily and weekly hours spent driving and working, and regulate the minimum amount of time drivers must spend resting between driving shifts. For intrastate commerce, the respective state's regulations apply.

The FMCSA is a division of the United States Department of Transportation (DOT), which is generally responsible for enforcement of FMCSA regulations. The driver of a CMV is required to keep a record of working hours using a log book, outlining the total number of hours spent driving and resting, as well as the time at which the change of duty status occurred. In lieu of a log book, a motor carrier may keep track of a driver's hours using electronic logging devices (ELDs). These devices are a form of telematics used in fleet management to automatically record driving time and other vehicle data.

The HOS's main purpose is to prevent accidents caused by driver fatigue. This is accomplished by limiting the number of driving hours per day, and the number of driving and working hours per week. Fatigue is also prevented by keeping drivers on a 21- to 24-hour schedule, maintaining a natural sleep/wake cycle (or circadian rhythm). Drivers are required to take a daily minimum period of rest, and are allowed longer "weekend" rest periods to combat cumulative fatigue effects that accrue on a weekly basis.

Enforcement of the HOS is generally handled by DOT officers of each state, and are sometimes checked when CMVs pass through weigh stations. Drivers found to be in violation of the HOS can be forced to stop driving for a certain period of time, which may negatively affect the motor carrier's safety rating. Requests to change the HOS are a source of contentious debate, and many surveys indicate some drivers get away with routinely violating the HOS. These facts have started another debate on whether motor carriers should be required to use ELDs in their vehicles, instead of relying on paper-based log books.

== Purpose ==
A graph outlining the relationship between number of hours driven and the percent of crashes related to driver fatigue. Source: Federal Motor Carrier Safety Administration

Drivers subject to the HOS include any driver of a vehicle which has a gross vehicle weight of 10,001 pounds (4,536 kg) or more; which is designed or used to transport more than 8 passengers (including the driver) for compensation; which is designed or used to transport more than 15 passengers (including the driver) and is not used to transport passengers for compensation; or which is used to transport hazardous materials in quantities requiring the vehicle to be marked or placarded under the hazardous materials regulations.

The purpose of the HOS is to reduce accidents caused by driver fatigue. As the graph to the right illustrates, the number of hours spent driving has a strong correlation to the number of fatigue-related accidents. According to numerous studies, the risk of fatigue is also greatest between midnight and 6:00 a.m., and increases with the total length of the driver's trip. The blanket assignment of midnight as the time of day when all drivers gain fresh hours may therefore not be the safest choice possible.

The FMCSA identifies three main factors in driver fatigue: Circadian rhythm effects, sleep deprivation and cumulative fatigue effects, and industrial or "time-on-task" fatigue.

Circadian rhythm effects describe the tendency for humans to experience a normal cycle in attentiveness and sleepiness through the 24-hour day. Those with a conventional sleep pattern (sleeping for seven or eight hours at night) experience periods of maximum fatigue in the early hours of the morning and a lesser period in the early afternoon. During the low points of this cycle, one experiences reduced attentiveness. During the high points, it is difficult to sleep soundly. The cycle is anchored in part by ambient lighting (darkness causes a person's body to release the hormone melatonin, which induces sleep), and a person's imposed pattern of regular sleeping and waking times. The influence of the day-night cycle is never fully displaced (standard artificial lighting is not strong enough to inhibit the release of melatonin), and the performance of night shift workers usually suffers. Circadian rhythms are persistent and can only be shifted by one to two hours forward or backward per day. Changing the starting time of a work shift by more than these amounts will reduce attentiveness, which is common after the first night shift following a "weekend" break during which conventional sleep times were followed.

Sleep deprivation and cumulative fatigue effects describe how individuals who fail to have an adequate period of sleep (7–8 hours in 24 hours) or who have been awake longer than the conventional 16–17 hours will suffer sleep deprivation. A sleep deficit accumulates with successive sleep-deprived days, and additional fatigue may be caused by breaking daily sleep into two shorter periods in place of a single unbroken period of sleep. A sleep deficit is not instantly reduced by one night's sleep; it may take two or three conventional sleep cycles for an individual to return to unimpaired performance.

Industrial or "time-on-task" fatigue describes fatigue accumulated during the working period and affects performance at different times during the shift. Performance declines the longer a person is engaged in a task, gradually during the first few hours and more steeply toward the end of a long period at work. Reduced performance has also been observed in the first hour of work as an individual adjusts to the working environment.

== Definition of terms ==
Parts of a driver's work day are defined in four terms: On-duty time, off-duty time, driving time, and sleeper berth time.

FMCSA regulation §395.2 states:

On-duty time is all time from when a driver begins to work or is required to be in readiness to work until the driver is relieved from work and all responsibility for performing work.

On-duty time includes:

- All time at a plant, terminal, facility, or other property of a motor carrier or shipper, or on any public property, waiting to be dispatched, unless the driver has been relieved from duty by the carrier
- All time inspecting, servicing, or conditioning any CMV at any time
- Crossing a border
- All driving time as defined in the term "driving time"
- All time, other than driving time, in or upon any CMV except time spent resting in a sleeper berth
- All time loading or unloading a CMV, supervising, or assisting in the loading or unloading, attending a CMV being loaded or unloaded, remaining in readiness to operate the CMV, or in giving or receiving receipts for shipments loaded or unloaded
- All time repairing, obtaining assistance, or remaining in attendance upon a disabled CMV
- All time spent providing a breath sample or urine specimen, including travel time to and from the collection site, to comply with random, reasonable suspicion, post-accident, or follow-up drug testing
- Performing any other work in the capacity, employ, or service of a motor carrier
- Performing any compensated work for a person who is not a motor carrier (This rule does not explicitly forbid a driver from obtaining a second or part-time job; it simply prevents a driver switching from a non-driving job to a driving job without the required 10 hours of rest)

Driving time is all time spent at the driving controls of a CMV.

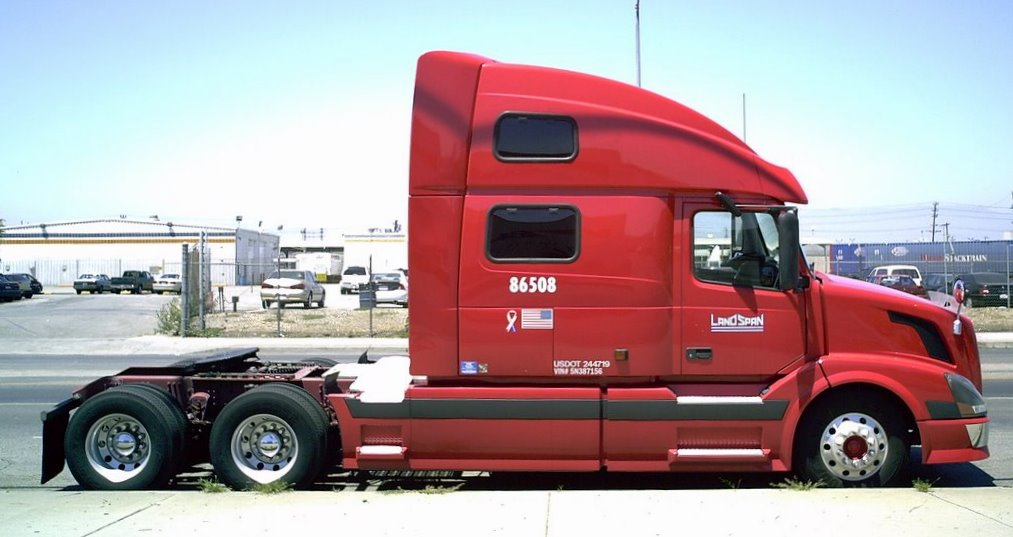
The sleeper berth is the area toward the rear of the truck cab (with the dark tinted windows).

Sleeper berth time is any amount of time spent inside the sleeper berth (e.g., resting or sleeping). FMCSA regulation §393.76 gives the minimum requirements for a space to be defined as a sleeper berth. The simple definition is an area separate from (usually immediately behind) the driving controls that includes a bed. The rules do not explicitly require that a driver must sleep, only that a driver must take a period of "rest" within the sleeper berth or off-duty (i.e., home). A statement made by the ICC in 1937 gives the reason: "We have no control over the manner in which a driver may spend his time off-duty, although some of his spare time activities may tire him as much as any work would do. We can only emphasize, by this comment, the responsibility which is the driver's own to assure himself of adequate rest and sleep, in the time available for this purpose, to ensure safety of his driving, and likewise the employer's responsibility to see that his drivers report for work in fit condition."

Off-duty time is any time not spent on-duty, driving, or in the sleeper berth.

== History ==
Summary of changes to the hours of service
Year Enforced	Driving Hours	On-Duty Hours	Off-Duty Hours	Minimum Duty Cycle	Maximum Hours On-Duty Before 30 Minute Rest Break
1938	12	15	9	24	None
1939	10	None	8	24	None
1962	10	15	8	18	None
2003^{1}	11	14	10	21	None
2013^{1}	11	14	10	34	8	^{1} Applies to property-carrying vehicles only.

In 1938, the now-abolished Interstate Commerce Commission (ICC) enforced the first HOS rules. Drivers were limited to 12 hours of work within a 15-hour period. Work was defined as loading, unloading, driving, handling freight, preparing reports, preparing vehicles for service, or performing any other duty pertaining to the transportation of passengers or property. The ICC intended the 3-hour difference between 15 hours on-duty and 12 hours of work to be used for meals and rest breaks. The weekly maximum was limited to 60 hours over 7 days (non-daily drivers), or 70 hours over 8 days (daily drivers). These rules allowed for 12 hours of work within a 15-hour period, 9 hours of rest, with 3 hours for breaks within a 24-hour day.

Within a short time, however, representatives of organized labor (including the American Federation of Labor, the Teamsters, and the International Association of Machinists) petitioned for a stay of the original regulations. A few motor carriers made a similar request. The ICC agreed, and oral arguments were heard again. Labor wanted HOS limits of 8 hours per day and 48 hours per week. The ICC commented "there was no statistical or other information which would enable [them] to say definitely how long a driver can safely work."

The evidence before us clearly does not suffice to enable us to conclude that a duty period as low as 8 hours in 24 is required in the interest of safety. We may call attention, as did the division, to the contrast between factory operations, generally sustained in character, and the operation of buses and trucks, generally characterized by frequent stops ... because of conditions encountered in highway and street traffic. The monotony or nervous and physical strain of driving such vehicles is alleviated by these breaks in the periods devoted to driving, and the period of actual work is considerably below the period on-duty.

— Interstate Commerce Commission (12 July 1938)

Within six months of the original ruling, the ICC ultimately decided to change the 12-hour work limit in 24 hours to a 10-hour driving limit in 24 hours, and the 15-hour on-duty limit was rescinded. Motor carriers were required to give drivers 8, rather than 9, consecutive hours off-duty each day. These rules allowed for 10 hours of driving and 8 hours of rest within a 24-hour day.

In 1962, for reasons it never clearly explained, the ICC eliminated the 24-hour cycle rule, and reinstated the 15-hour on-duty limit. With 10 hours of driving and 8 hours of sleep, drivers were allowed to maintain an 18-hour cycle, disrupting the driver's natural 24-hour circadian rhythm. This change allowed up to 16 hours of driving per day, allowing the driver to exhaust their weekly limits in as little as five days. Later, an added exception for trucks equipped with sleeper berths meant drivers were allowed to "split" their 8-hour off-duty time into two parts. With the new splitting provision, a driver could take two 4-hour periods of rest. Using one of these short rest periods would effectively "stop the on-duty clock", allowing the driver to split the 15-hour on-duty time limit into two parts as well. These rules allowed for 10 hours of work within a 15-hour time limit, and 8 hours of rest within an 18-hour day.

Between 1962 and 2003, there were numerous proposals to change the HOS again, but none were ever finalized. By this time, the ICC had been abolished, and regulations were now issued by the FMCSA. The 2003 changes applied only to property-carrying drivers (i.e., truck drivers). These rules allowed 11 hours of driving within a 14-hour period, and required 10 hours of rest. These changes would allow drivers (using the entire 14-hour on-duty period) to maintain a natural 24-hour cycle, with a bare minimum 21-hour cycle (11 hours driving, 10 hours rest). However, the retention of the split sleeper berth provision would allow drivers to maintain irregular, short-burst sleeping schedules.

The most notable change of 2003 was the introduction of the "34-hour restart." Before the change, drivers could only gain more weekly driving hours with the passing of each day (which reduced their 70-hour total by the number of hours driven on the earliest day of the weekly cycle). After the change, drivers were allowed to "reset" their weekly 70-hour limit to zero, by taking 34 consecutive hours off-duty. This provision was introduced to combat the cumulative fatigue effects that accrue on a weekly basis, and to allow for two full nights of rest (e.g., during a weekend break).

In 2005, the FMCSA changed the rules again, practically eliminating the split sleeper berth provision. Drivers are now required to take a full 8 hours of rest, with 2 hours allowed for off-duty periods, for a total of 10 hours off-duty. This provision forced drivers to take one longer uninterrupted period of rest, but eliminated the flexibility of allowing drivers to take naps during the day without jeopardizing their driving time. Today's rule still allows them to "split" the sleeper berth period, but one of the splits must be 8 hours long and the remaining 2 hours do not stop the 14-hour on-duty period. This rule is confusing and impractical for most drivers, resulting in the majority of drivers taking the full 10-hour break.

In the years since 2005, groups such as Public Citizen Litigation Group, Parents Against Tired Truckers (PATT), Owner-Operator Independent Drivers Association (OOIDA), Citizens for Reliable and Safe Highways (CRASH, which has merged with PATT), and the American Trucking Associations (ATA), have been working to change the HOS again. Each group has their own ideas about what should be changed, and different agendas on why the rules should be changed.

== Property-carrying vehicles ==
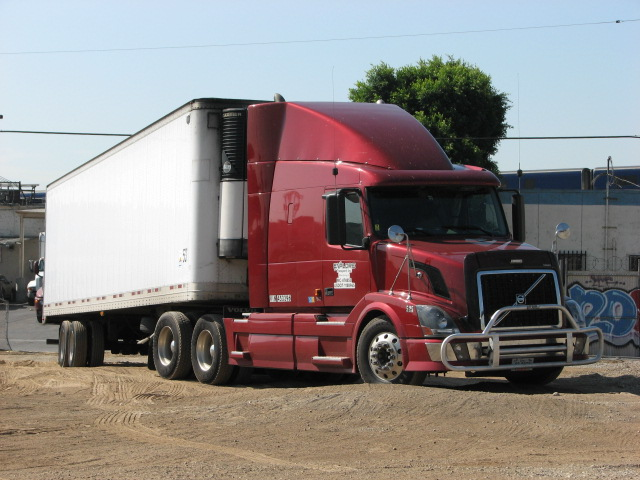
A property-carrying vehicle

FMCSA rules prohibit driving a property-carrying CMV (e.g., trucks) more than 11 hours or to drive after having been on-duty for 14 hours. The 3-hour difference between the 11-hour driving limit and the 14-hour on-duty limit gives drivers the opportunity to take care of non-driving working duties such as loading and unloading cargo, fueling the vehicle, and required vehicle inspections, as well as non-working duties such as meal and rest breaks. After completing an 11- to 14-hour on-duty period, the driver must spend 10 hours off-duty.

FMCSA rules prohibit drivers from operating a CMV after having been on-duty 60 hours in 7 consecutive days (if the motor carrier does not operate CMVs every day of the week), or after having been on-duty 70 hours in 8 consecutive days (if the motor carrier operates CMVs every day of the week).

After accumulating, for example, 70 hours of driving and on-duty time within a period of 8 days, a driver's daily driving limit may be reduced (70 / 8 = 8.75 driving hours per day). A driver may be allowed (but not required) to take 34 hours off-duty to reset the weekly total back to zero (also known as a "34-hour restart").

== Passenger-carrying vehicles ==
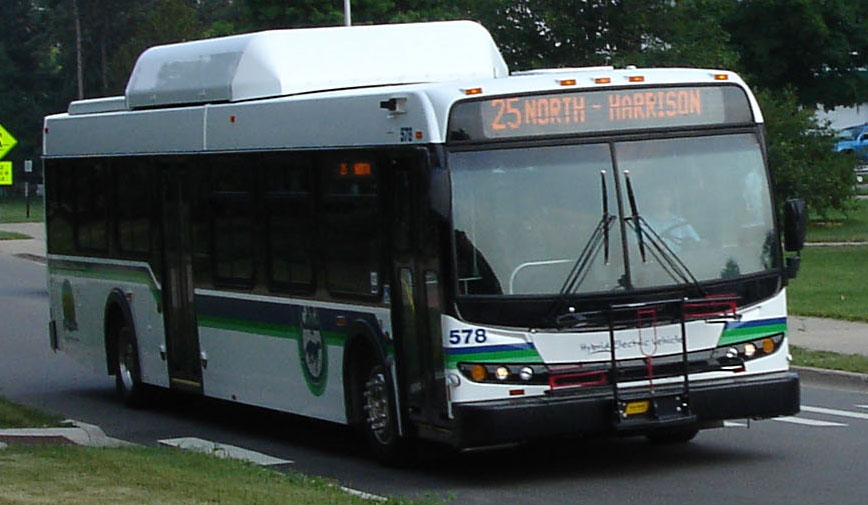
A passenger-carrying vehicle

FMCSA rules prohibit driving a passenger-carrying CMV (e.g., commercial and intercity buses, passenger vans, and school buses) for more than 10 hours, or to drive after having been on-duty for 15 hours. The 5-hour difference between the 10-hour driving limit and the 15-hour on-duty limit gives drivers the opportunity to take care of non-driving work-related duties such as loading and unloading of passengers and luggage, and fueling the vehicle, as well as non-working duties such as meal and rest breaks. After completing a 10 to 15-hour on-duty period, the driver must be allowed 8 hours off-duty.

The FMCSA weekly hours limitations for passenger-carrying vehicles are identical to those for property-carrying vehicles.

After accumulating, for example, 60 hours of driving and on-duty time within a period of 7 days, a driver's daily driving limit may be reduced (60 / 7 = 8.57 driving hours per day). The driver of a passenger-carrying vehicle may not use the 34-hour restart provision.

== Log book ==
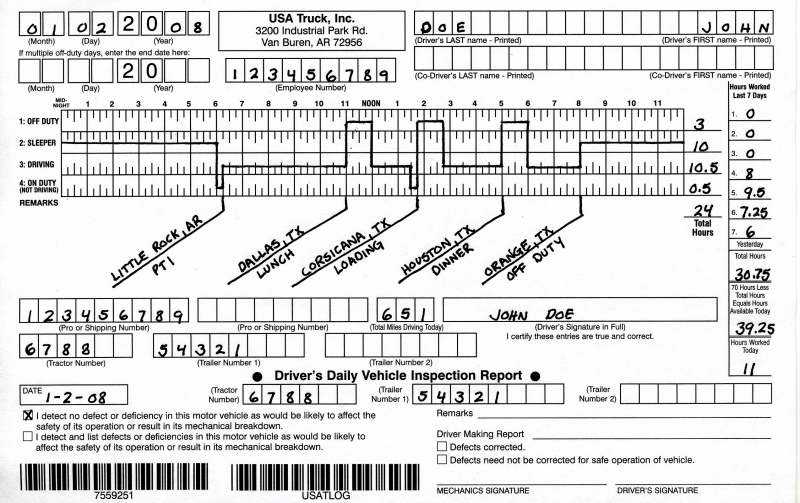
An example of a driver's log book, showing the time grid, cities where the driver has stopped driving, along with the vehicle, driver, and load information.

Every driver of a CMV is required to keep track of their time with a log book or an ELD. A log book is simply a notebook with a grid pattern on every page, dividing the 24-hour day into 15-minute (1/4-hour) segments. Drivers are required to make carbon copies of each page, so one page may be kept with the driver (to be produced upon inspection by DOT officers), and so the other copy may be sent to the driver's employer.

Electronic Logging Devices can be thought of as an automated electronic log book. An ELD records the same information as a manual paper log book, and requires less input from the driver. The ELD automatically records driving time and location, leaving the driver responsible only for reporting on-duty and off-duty time. In these respects, the ELD is less susceptible to forgery than a paper log book.

FMCSA rules require that a log book (or ELD) must record for each change of duty status (e.g., the place of reporting for work, or starting to drive), the name of the city, town or village, with state abbreviation. If a change of duty status occurs at a location other than a city, the highway number and nearest milepost or the nearest two intersecting roadways followed by the name of the nearest city must be recorded. In addition to the time grid, a log book must record the date, total miles driven for the day, truck and trailer number, name of carrier, bill of lading number, and the driver's signature. The driver is required to retain a copy of each log page for the previous seven consecutive days which must be in their possession and available for inspection while on-duty.

== Exceptions ==
There are numerous exceptions to these rules, some of these include but are not limited to:

- During adverse weather or emergency driving conditions, drivers are permitted to exceed the 11 hour maximum daily driving time. However, drivers may not extend the 14 hour on duty time. This changed as of 29 September 2020, and now drivers may extend their 14-hour limits by up to 2 hours for adverse conditions. This exception includes unusual traffic conditions but not recurring traffic conditions which should reasonably have been anticipated.
- Drivers who venture less than a 150 air-mile radius from their work reporting location are not required to maintain log books (but are not exempt from limits on driving time), provided their employers maintain accurate records of their driving time.
- Drivers who start and stop their work day at the same location for at least the previous 5 work days may drive past the 14 hour mark, for an extra 2 hours, if 11 driving hours are not exceeded. The 16-hour rule extends the work day by two hours, but does not extend the allowable driving hours. The 16-hour rule may be invoked once per 34 hour reset, if the 5 day pattern has been established. The driver must be relieved from work after the 16th hour.
- Drivers for oilfield operations in the petroleum industry, groundwater drilling operations, construction materials, and utility service vehicles are permitted to take a 24-hour restart.
- Retail store drivers who venture less than a 100 air-mile (115.08 statute miles or 185.2 kilometers) radius are allowed to exceed daily driving limits to make store deliveries from 10 December to 25 December, because of the demands of the Christmas shopping season.
- Drivers in Alaska can drive up to 15 hours within a 20-hour period.
- Drivers in Hawaii are not required to maintain log books, provided their employers keep accurate records of their driving time.
- Drivers in California are allowed up to 12 driving hours and 16 on duty hours.
- Drivers for theatrical or television motion picture productions are exempt if the driver operates within a 100 air-mile radius of the location where the driver reports to and is released from work. These drivers may take an 8-hour break, and are allowed 15 hours on duty.

== Enforcement ==
The HOS are issued, among other industry-related regulations, by the FMCSA. In this instance, federal regulations apply only to interstate commerce. Commerce which does not involve the crossing of state lines is considered intrastate, and is under the jurisdiction of the respective state's laws. However, most states have adopted intrastate regulations which are identical or very similar to the federal HOS regulations.

Enforcement of the HOS rules is generally handled by DOT officers of their respective states, although any ordinary police officer may inspect a driver's log book. States are responsible for maintaining weigh stations commonly located at the borders between states, where drivers are pulled in for random vehicle inspections (although some of the inspections are based on the motor carrier's safety rating). Otherwise, a driver may be pulled over for random checks by police officers or DOT officials at any time. Drivers are required to maintain their log books to current status, and if inspections reveal any sort of discrepancy, drivers may be put "out of service" until the driver has accumulated enough off-duty time to be back in compliance. Being put out of service means a driver may not drive his truck during the prescribed limit under risk of further penalty. Repeated violations can result in fines from $1,000 to $11,000 and a downgrade in the motor carrier's safety rating.

Long-haul drivers are normally paid by the mile, not by the hour. Legally, truck drivers are not required to receive overtime pay for hours worked in excess of the standard 40-hour work week. Some drivers may choose to violate the HOS to earn more money. Being paid by the mile, any work performed that is not actual driving is of no value to the driver, providing incentive to falsify the amount of time spent performing non-driving duties. Drivers who falsify their log books often under-report their non-driving duties (such as waiting to be loaded and unloaded) which they are not paid for, and under-report their driving time or total miles. Many drivers who receive mileage pay are not paid by logged miles or actual miles, instead, motor carriers use computer mapping software (such as PC Miler) or published mileage guides (such as the Rand McNally Household Goods Carriers' Bureau Mileage Guide). PATT suggests that paying all drivers by the hour would reduce HOS violations by removing the incentive to "cheat the system" by driving more miles than are being logged. Surveys by OOIDA report 80% of drivers are not paid for waiting times while loading and unloading, and the majority of those drivers log these times as off-duty (while regulations require they be logged as on-duty). These same drivers reported they would log these times as on-duty if they were paid reasonably for such delays.

Drivers can get away with this rule-breaking because of their paper-based log books. As drivers record their time spent behind the wheel, there is very little to stop them from forging their log books. There is very superficial oversight and some drivers take advantage of this fact. Surveys indicate that between 25% and 75% of drivers violate the HOS. Other drivers maintain more than one log book, showing falsified versions to enforcement officers.

Trucking companies (motor carriers) can also play a role in HOS violations. Certain carriers may choose to knowingly ignore HOS violations made by their drivers, or even encourage their drivers to do so. Allowing drivers to violate the HOS is an effective cost-cutting measure used mostly by non-union, long haul carriers. Permitting HOS violations allows a carrier to hire fewer drivers, and run on fewer trucks than a company which follows the rules. To comply with the HOS, these companies would have to hire more drivers (possibly driving up wages) and purchase additional trucks and trailers. Making a change to comply with the law is complicated by competition with carriers that already comply with HOS regulations. Because of this competition, carriers who choose to switch from non-compliance could not pass on all of their increased costs associated with HOS compliance to their customers.

In 1999, two trucking company officials were sentenced to federal prison for violating hours of service regulations. Charles Georgoulakos Jr. and his brother, James Georgoulakos were sentenced to four months in prison, eight months in home confinement, and one year of supervised release. Their company, C&J Trucking Company of Londonderry, New Hampshire, was placed on two years probation and fined $25,000 (the maximum amount). The sentences were the result of an investigation which began when one of the trucking company's drivers was involved in a collision on Interstate 93 in Londonderry on 2 Aug. 1995, in which four individuals were killed.

The defendants admitted that they knowingly and willfully permitted employee truck drivers to violate hours of service safety regulations. The corporation executed a scheme to hide illegal hours of driving from detection by Federal Highway Administration (FHWA) safety investigators who conduct periodic examinations of trucking companies' records. The scheme involved paying drivers "off the books" for illegal driving time through an account other than the normal payroll account.

— U.S. Department of Transportation

Several private and public motor carriers such as Frito-Lay, United Parcel Service, and Werner Enterprises, have voluntarily implemented electronic on-board recorders to ensure drivers are in compliance with the federal regulations, to reduce the errors and hassles associated with paper log books, and to improve driver retention and recruitment. EOBRs automatically record the driving time and cannot be easily forged. Any violation of the HOS will automatically be recorded and reported to the company.

The FMCSA posted a notice of proposed rule making (NPRM) concerning Electronic logging devices (ELD's), as part of the move to require mandatory ELD's for all carriers, on 18 January 2007. On 18 December 2017, ELD rules were implemented as part of the Congressionally mandated MAP-21 Act, for all carriers subjected to the record of duty status (RODS) requirements.

The Federal Motor Carrier Safety Administration (FMCSA) announced the Final Rule of the ELD mandate, and ELD regulations being implemented in several phases with a compliance date of 18 December 2017. Fleets had until December 2017 to implement certified ELDs to record hours. Fleets already equipped with loggers or recorders had until December 2019 to ensure compliance with the published specifications

== Rewriting the hours of service ==
The 2011 final rule kept the 11- and 14-hour limits, required drivers to take a 30-minute break within the first 8 hours of on-duty time, and limited use of the 34-hour restart to once per week (168 hours). Congress suspended the once-per-week restart limit and related restart provisions in December 2014, and FMCSA later removed them from the regulations, restoring the earlier restart rule. Up to 2 hours either side of a sleeper-berth period while in the passenger seat will count as off-duty. Drivers inside a parked CMV who are not in the sleeper berth must log it as on-duty.

This regulation has been codified into the Final Rule, and came into force on 27 February 2013 (for the additional Off Duty allowances) and 1 July 2013 (for the break rules, and restart limits).

HOS Final Rule On 27 December 2011 (76 FR 81133), FMCSA published a final rule amending its hours-of-service (HOS) regulations for drivers of property-carrying commercial motor vehicles (CMVs). The final rule adopted several changes to the HOS regulations, including a new provision requiring drivers to take a rest break during the work day under certain circumstances. Drivers may drive a CMV only if 8 hours or less have passed since the end of the driver's last off-duty or sleeper-berth period of at least 30 minutes. FMCSA did not specify when drivers must take the 30-minute break, but the rule requires that they wait no longer than 8 hours after the last off-duty or sleeper-berth period of that length or longer to take the break. Drivers who already take shorter breaks during the work day could comply with the rule by taking one of the shorter breaks and extending it to 30 minutes. The new requirement took effect on 1 July 2013.

On 2 August 2013, the U.S. Court of Appeals for the District of Columbia Circuit issued its ruling on the Hours of Service litigation brought by the American Trucking Associations and Public Citizen. The Court upheld the 2011 Hours of Service regulations in all aspects except for the 30-minute break provision as it applies to short haul drivers. While the decision does not officially take effect until the mandate is issued 52 days after the decision (unless a party files a petition for rehearing, either by the panel or en banc, or moves to stay the mandate pending the filing of a petition for certiorari in the Supreme Court), FMCSA announces the Agency will immediately cease enforcement of the 30-minute rest break provision of the HOS rule against short-haul operations. The Agency requests that its State enforcement partners also cease enforcement of this provision. States that do so will not be found in violation of the Motor Carrier Safety Assistance Program (MCSAP). ENFORCEMENT POLICY Effective 2 August 2013, FMCSA will no longer enforce 49 CFR 395.3(a)(3)(ii) against any driver that qualifies for either of the "short haul operations" exceptions outlined in 49 CFR 395.1(e)(1) or (2). The Agency requests that State and local enforcement agencies also refrain from enforcing the 30-minute rest break against these drivers. Specifically, the following drivers would not be subject to the 30-minute break requirement:

- All drivers (CDL and non-CDL) that operate within 150 air-miles of their normal work reporting location and satisfy the time limitations and record keeping requirements of 395.1(e)(1).
- Non-CDL drivers that operate within a 150 air-mile radius of the location where the driver reports for duty and satisfy the time limitations and record keeping requirements of 395.1

=== 2018 ===
An Advanced Notice of Proposed Rule making (ANPRM) was published in August 2018, to revisit the 2013 HOS rules with possible changes that would include the 30 minute break. The ANPRM was in response to a Congressional mandate and industry concerns that may lead to hours of service rule reforms concerning the air-mile "short-haul" exemption, modification to the 14-hour on-duty limitation, revision of the current mandatory 30-minute break for truck drivers after 8 hours of continuous driving, and reinstating split-sleeper berth options.

=== 2020 final rule ===
On June 1, 2020, FMCSA published a final rule revising the hours-of-service regulations, which took effect on September 29, 2020. The rule:

- expanded the short-haul exception to 150 air-miles and allowed a 14-hour duty period under it;
- allowed the driving window to be extended by up to 2 hours in adverse driving conditions;
- required the 30-minute break only after 8 hours of cumulative driving time, rather than on-duty time, and allowed it to be satisfied by any non-driving period, on-duty or off-duty;
- allowed drivers to split the required 10 hours off duty into one period of at least 7 hours in the sleeper berth and another of at least 2 hours, with neither period counting against the 14-hour driving window.

== See also ==
- Airline pilot
- Bus driver
- Commercial driver's license
- Drivers' working hours (European Union)
- Federal Motor Carrier Safety Administration
- Helmsman
- List of trucking industry terms in the United States
- Public Citizen Litigation Group
- Railroad engineer
- Tachograph
- Truck driver
- Trucking industry in the United States
- U.S. Department of Transportation
