= Anne S. Ferro =

American government official (born 1958)

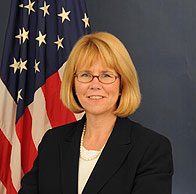

Administrator of the Federal Motor Carrier Safety Administration
- In office November 13, 2009 – August 15, 2014
- President: Barack Obama
- Preceded by: John Hill
- Succeeded by: Scott Darling

Personal details
- Education: St. John's College; University of Maryland
- Website: Official website

Anne S. Ferro (born 1958, Baltimore) is an American government official, currently serving as president and CEO of the American Association of Motor Vehicle Administrators, a nonprofit organization creating model programs in motor vehicle administration, law enforcement, and highway safety. She previously served as president of the Maryland Motor Truck Association, administrator of the United States Federal Motor Carrier Safety Administration, and as administrator of the Maryland Motor Vehicle Administration of the Maryland Department of Transportation.

Ferro's focus on truck driver's safety during her time as administrator of the United States Federal Motor Carrier Safety Administration is perhaps her most notable work. Ferro emphasized using real-time data on driver behavior to minimize trucker-related accidents, she also fought against excessive disciplining of truck drivers. As Ferro once said during a 2011 interview with the Journal of Commerce, “It’s all about the driver”.
