= Service book =

Service book or Service Book may refer to:

- Liturgical book, giving the text of a religious service
- Seaman Service Book, a continuous record of a seaman's service.
- Service book (motor vehicle), recording service history of the vehicle

== See also ==
- Logbook
