= Robin Hutcheson =

American transportation official

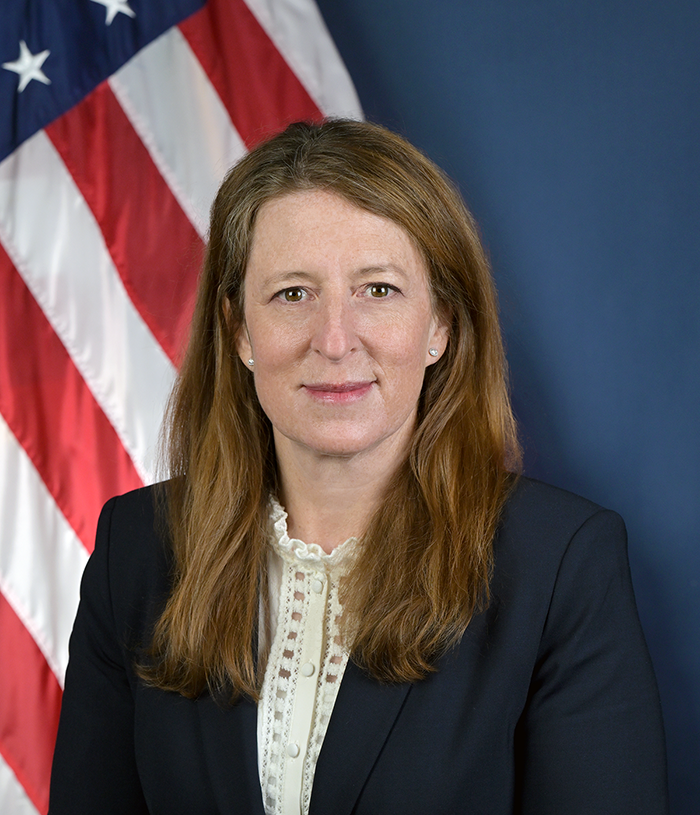

Former Administrator of the Federal Motor Carrier Safety Administration
- In office September 26, 2022 – January 26, 2024
- President: Joe Biden
- Preceded by: Raymond P. Martinez (2019)
- Succeeded by: Derek Barrs

Personal details
- Education: University of Colorado; Boulder (BS); University of Utah (MS)

Robin Meredith Cohn Hutcheson is an American transportation official who served as administrator of the Federal Motor Carrier Safety Administration.

== Early life and education ==
A native of Connecticut, Hutcheson earned a bachelor's from the University of Colorado Boulder and a master's degree from the University of Utah.

== Career ==
From 2004 to 2006, Hutcheson worked as a transit planner in Karlsruhe, Germany. She then returned to Salt Lake City, where she worked as a senior associate at Fehr & Peers from 2006 to 2010. From 2012 to 2016, she was the transportation director of Salt Lake City. From 2016 to 2021, she served as the director of public works for Minneapolis. She was also the president of the National Association of City Transportation Officials.

In January 2021, Hutcheson became a deputy assistant secretary of transportation for safety policy in the United States Department of Transportation. She became deputy administrator and acting administrator of the Federal Motor Carrier Safety Administration (FMCSA) in January 2022. In April 2022, President Joe Biden announced her nomination as the administrator of the FMCSA. Hearings on her nomination were held before the Senate Commerce Committee on June 8, 2022. Her nomination was favorably reported to the Senate floor on June 22, 2022. She was confirmed by the United States Senate via voice vote on September 22, 2022. Her last day in that position was January 26, 2024.

In December 2025, Hutcheson was appointed as the chair of the Metropolitan Council in the Minneapolis-St. Paul region.
