= Derek Barrs =

American government official (born 1973)

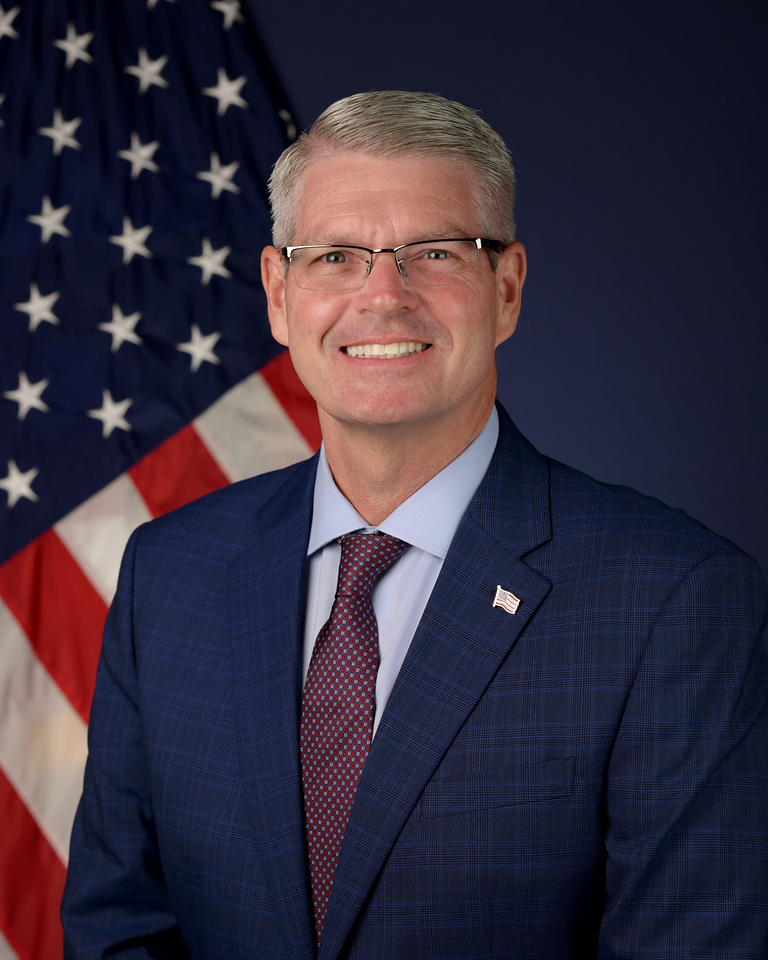

8th Administrator of the Federal Motor Carrier Safety Administration
- Incumbent
- Assumed office October 8, 2025
- President: Donald Trump
- Preceded by: Robin Hutcheson

Personal details
- Born: Derek D. Barrs; March 16, 1973 (age 53) Valdosta, Georgia, U.S.
- Party: Republican
- Relatives: 2
- Education: North Florida College (AS); Flagler College (BS)

Derek D. Barrs (born March 16, 1973) is an American government official currently serving as the eighth administrator of the Federal Motor Carrier Safety Administration.

== Early life and education ==
Barrs was born in Valdosta, Georgia. He attended North Florida Community College, graduating in 1997 with an associate's degree in Criminal justice. He later attended Flagler College graduating in 2012 with a bachelor's degree in Public administration.

== Career ==
Barrs began his service in law enforcement in 1991 as a deputy sheriff in Madison County, Florida. In 2001, Deputy Barrs joined the Florida Highway Patrol retiring in 2020 as chief.

Outside of law enforcement, Barrs served his Florida community as a high school football coach and mentor.

In the business world, Barrs was employed by the HNTB Corporation. During his five-year career at HNTB, Barrs rose from deputy program manager to associate vice president.

In July 2024, Barrs ran for a seat on the Flagler County District 3 school board. He began his membership on the District 1 school board in November 2024.

On October 7, 2025, Barrs was confirmed as the 8th Administrator of the Federal Motor Carrier Safety Administration.

== Personal life ==
Barrs has two children, a son serving in the United States Army and a daughter.
