= Digital tachograph =

Digital recorder for speed and distance of a vehicle

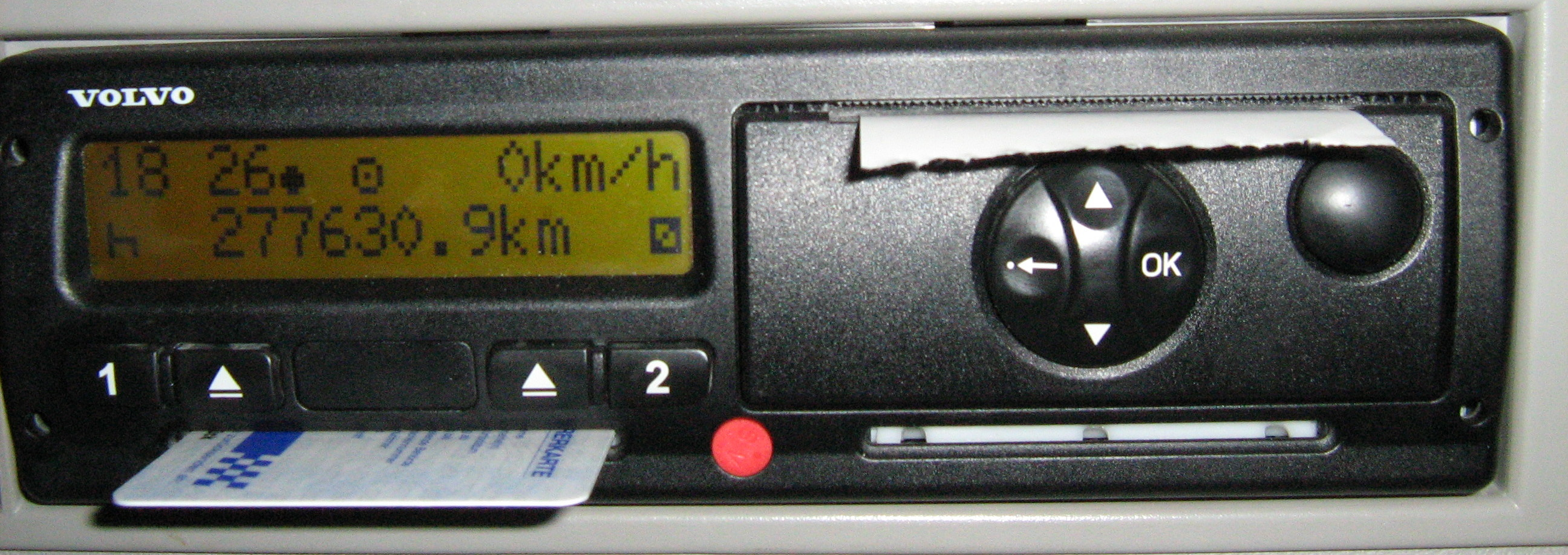
A digital tachograph in operation, with a driver card inserted.

A digital tachograph is a device fitted to a vehicle that digitally records its speed and distance, together with the driver's activity selected from a choice of modes.

In Europe, it succeeded the analogue tachograph as a result of European Union regulation 1360/2002 that made digital tachographs mandatory for all relevant vehicles manufactured after August 1, 2005. Digital tachographs would be required as of May 1, 2006 for all new vehicles for which EWG regulation VO(EWG)3820/85 applies, as is published in the official newsletter of the European Union L102 from April 11, 2006.

== Digital tachograph system ==
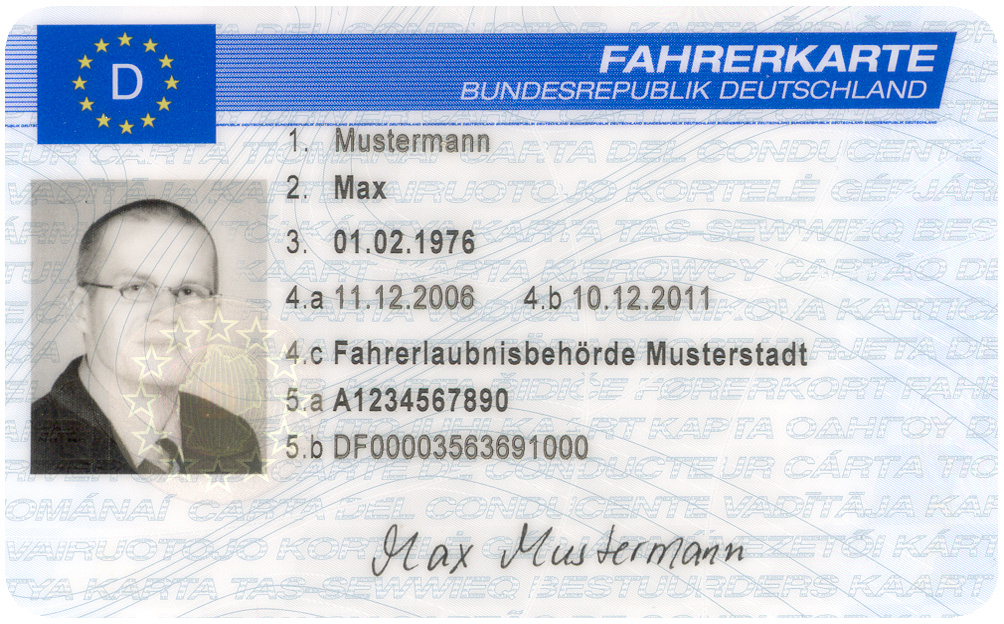
German Driver Card, front side (2007)

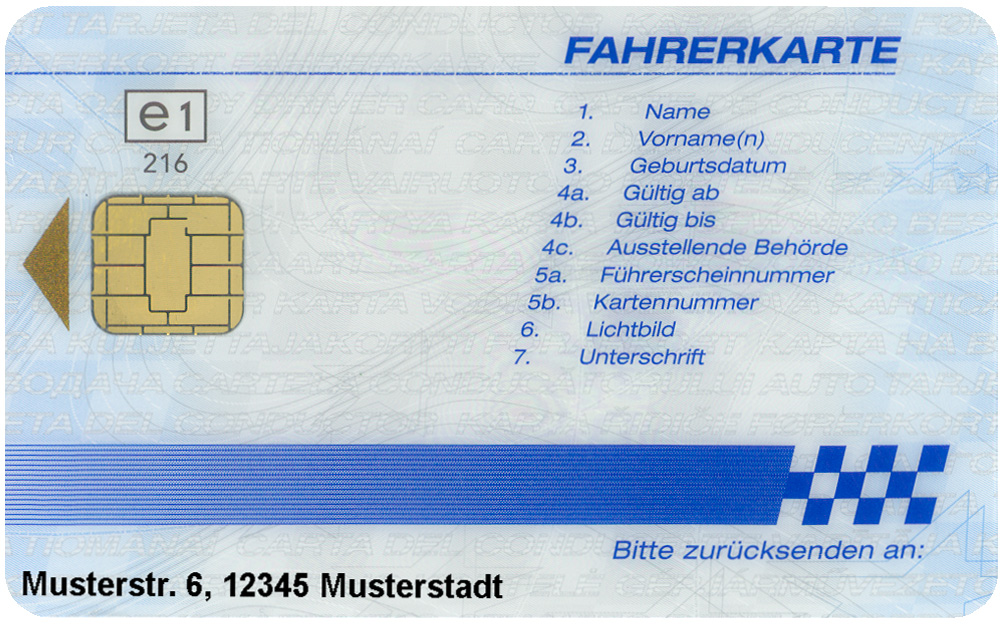
German Driver Card, rear side

A digital tachograph system consists of a digital driver card, the tachograph head, and a sender unit mounted to the vehicle gearbox. The sender unit produces electronic pulses as the gearbox output shaft turns. These pulses are interpreted as speed data by the head.

The sender unit and head are electronically paired and the pulses from the sender to the head are encrypted, therefore deterring tampering by intercepting or replicating the pulse signal in the intermediate wiring.

As well as automatically receiving speed data, the tachograph records the driver's activity selected from a choice of modes. The 'drive mode' is activated automatically when the vehicle is in motion, and digital tachograph heads usually default to the 'other work' mode upon coming to rest. The 'rest' and 'availability' modes can be manually selected by the driver whilst stationary.

In Europe, drivers are legally required to accurately record their activities, retain the records and produce them on demand to transport authorities who are charged with enforcing regulations governing drivers' working hours. Regulation (EC) 561/2006 of the European Parliament and of the Council defines drivers hours.

=== Digital tachograph head models ===
- VDO DTCO 1381 / VDO DTCO 2.2 / VDO DTCO 4.0-4.0e (Smart) / VDO DTCO 4.1(Smart version 2)
- Stoneridge Electronics SE5000
- Actia SmarTach
- Efkon Efas 3 / Intellic Efas 4

=== Digital card types ===
There are several types of digital card, depending on the function of the card owner:

- Driver cards are used by drivers to record driving information.
- Company cards are used by operators to retrieve data regarding their employees from the tachograph head. It also allows a company to lock information so that it cannot be subsequently obtained by another operator.
- Control cards are used by law enforcement agencies to retrieve data from the tachograph head. A control card overrides any company locks put in place by operators.
- Workshop cards are used by authorized tachograph technicians to fit and calibrate tachographs.

== Data storage ==
The activity information is stored in the tachograph head's internal memory and simultaneously onto the flash memory chip contained within the digital driver card whilst it is inserted into the head.

A digital driver card is issued to an individual driver by a country's driving authority on application. In the UK this is the DVLA.

Speed information is also stored, but only on the tachograph head's internal memory. Speed data is stored in at least 1-hertz intervals, depending on the model of tachograph head.

When either memory bank is full, the oldest data is automatically overwritten with the current data. Design specifications prevent data being altered or deleted, therefore ensuring the integrity of the data for subsequent analysis and presentation in a court case.

Data can be locked in the tachograph head by using a company card. This ensures that the data cannot be retrieved by another company should the vehicle subsequently change ownership, or in the case or lease or hire vehicles that are used by many companies during their life. All data can still be retrieved by use of a control card or a workshop card.

The retrieved data should be stored as described in European Regulation 1360/2002 in file that can be imported into tachograph analysis software.

These files needs to be named properly as required by authorities in certain countries. The extensions used for the stored files are DDD, V1B or C1B in France and TGD in Spain.

== Comparison with the analogue system ==
=== Advantages of digital tachographs ===
The digital data stored by the tachograph system can be analysed by computer and infringements automatically identified.

Digital data is encrypted and cannot be altered or deleted by the driver once stored on the card or in the head.

Information is more explicitly defined in digital form and is less likely to be misinterpreted. When an analogue chart is visually analysed, a margin of error is present, dependent on the quality of the recording and the skill level of the analyst.

=== Disadvantages of digital tachographs ===
Without a digital card reader, computer and analysis software, the data can be more difficult to interpret as it is not visually represented as the analogue chart is, and requires mathematical calculations to decipher the information from its presented format. Some Renault branded tachograph heads can produce printed information in a graphical format, similar in appearance to the activity trace on an analogue tachograph chart.

== Newer models of tachographs or smart tachographs (Annex 1C) ==
Tachograph regulation Annex 1C introduced the second generation of digital tachographs called Smart tachographs or 1C tachographs.

These newer models connected with GPS receivers, secondary speed sensors and radio communication interfaces for authorities to remotely check for possible infringements avoiding this way the unnecessary roadside checks.

Position data is recorded every 3 hours of work and border crossings are also stored.

Version 2 of smart tachographs also records Load and unload operations and also has the possibility to enter load types.

== Data retrieval ==
All digital tachographs can be downloaded through their front connector with a specialized device.

Newer models also provide a remote download interface on their C connector.

Installing the remote download units requires a workshop and many countries require the tachograph to be calibrated after installation.

Mostly all manufacturers of download devices can deliver manual or front connector download devices or completely automated tachograph download systems.

== See also ==
- Tachograph
- Electronic logging device, similar device used in the US and Canada
- Drivers working hours
- Odometer
