= Tachograph =

Device that records the speed and distance of a vehicle

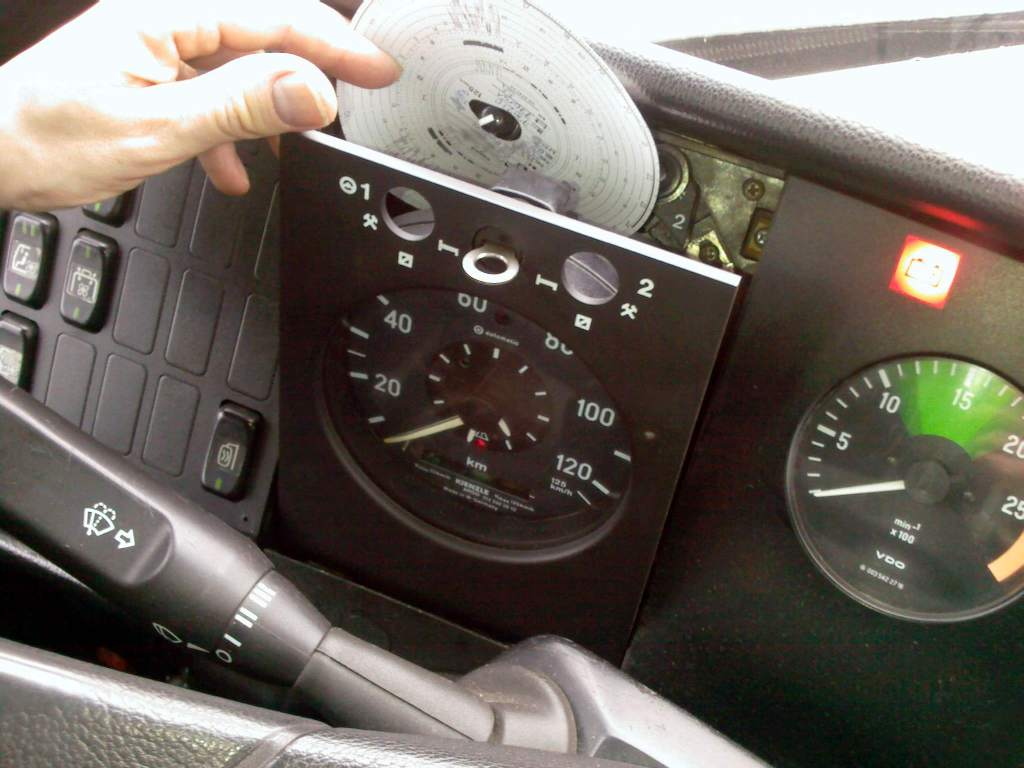
Analogue tachograph

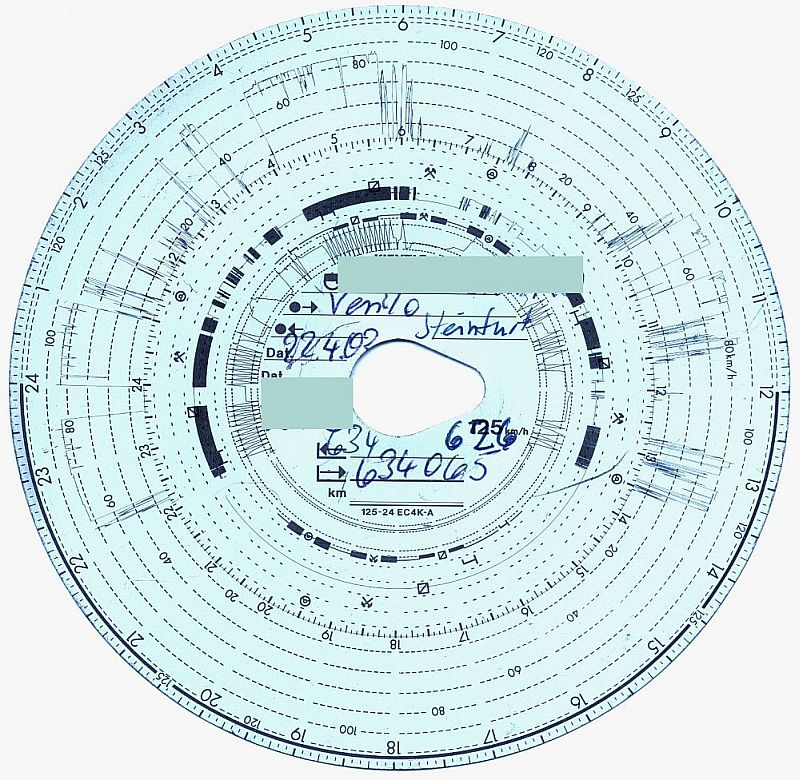
Tachograph chart

A tachograph is a device fitted to a vehicle that automatically records its speed and distance, together with the driver's activity selected from a choice of modes. The drive mode is activated automatically when the vehicle is in motion, and modern tachograph heads usually default to the other work mode upon coming to rest. The rest and availability modes can be manually selected by the driver whilst stationary.

A tachograph system comprises a sender unit mounted to the vehicle gearbox, the tachograph head and a recording medium. Tachograph heads are of either analogue or digital types. All relevant vehicles manufactured in the EU since 1 May 2006 must be fitted with digital tachograph heads. The recording medium for analogue heads are wax coated paper discs, and for digital heads there are two recording mediums: internal memory (which can be read out with one of a variety of download devices into a so-called .ddd file) and digital driver cards containing a microchip with flash memory. Digital driver cards store data in a format that can later also be read out as a .ddd file. These files – both those read from internal memory with a download device, and those read from the driver cards – can be imported into tachograph analysis/archival software, often as part of a larger fleet digitalisation system.

Drivers and their employers are legally required to accurately record their activities, retain the records (files from internal memory and from driver cards must both be retained) and produce them on demand to transport authorities who are in charge of enforcing regulations governing drivers' working hours.

They are also used in the maritime world, for example through the Central Commission for Navigation on the Rhine.

== Origins ==
The tachograph was originally introduced for the railways so that companies could better document irregularities. The inventor was Max Maria von Weber, a civil servant, engineer and author. The Daniel Tachometer has been known in the railway industry since 1844. The Hasler Event recorder was introduced in the 1920s.

== Regulations ==
For reasons of public safety, many jurisdictions have limits on the working hours of drivers of certain vehicles, such as buses and trucks. A tachograph can be used to monitor this and ensure that appropriate breaks are taken. The data collected is also used in some fleet management systems for driver scoring to analyse performance and encourage safer driving habits.

=== In Germany (historical) ===
The Verkehrs-Sicherungs-Gesetz (German Traffic Safety Law) of 19 December 1952, made tachographs mandatory in Germany for all commercial vehicles weighing over 7.5 tonnes. Since 23 March and 23 December 1953, all new commercial vehicles and buses must be equipped with the device per law Straßenverkehrs-Zulassungs-Ordnung § 57a.

Tachographs are mandatory for vehicles allowed to carry a total weight of over 3.5 tonnes and vehicles built to carry at least 9 passengers, if the vehicle is used for commercial purposes. They are used to review the driving and rest time of drivers during reviews by traffic standards organisations or accident investigation. A driver must carry the tachograph records with him for all days of the current week and the last day of the previous week that he drove. Companies must keep the records for 1 year. In Germany, § 16 of the work time regulations lengthens this time to 2 years if the records will be used as proof of work time.

=== Russia ===
In Russia, buses with more than 8 seats and trucks with a permitted gross weight of more than 3.5 tons (Order of the Ministry of Transport of Russia dated 13 February 2013, No. 36) must be equipped with tachographs in order to ensure safe conditions. A tachograph is mandatory for vehicles of class M2, M3, N2, N3. Vehicles must be equipped with on-board monitoring devices in accordance with regulatory documents.

From 1 April 2014, in the absence of a tachograph, fines will be applied to the following types of transport: - buses with more than 8 seats; - vehicles used to transport dangerous goods; — According to the order of the Ministry of Transport dated 17 December 2013 No. 470, Moscow "On Amendments to the Order of the Ministry of Transport of the Russian Federation dated 13 February 2013 No. 36", penalties will be applied to freight vehicles with a gross weight of over 15 tons engaged in intercity transportation starting 1 July 2014, penalties will be applied to freight vehicles with a gross weight of over 12 tons engaged in intercity transportation starting 1 September 2014, and penalties will be applied to freight vehicles with a gross weight of over 3.5 tons engaged in intercity transportation starting 1 April 2015.

Russian tachographs use a cryptographic information protection tool (CIPF). Requirements for the use of the CIPF unit as part of tachographs are established by Order of the Ministry of Transport of Russia No. 36 dated 13.02.2013.

==== Digital tachograph ====
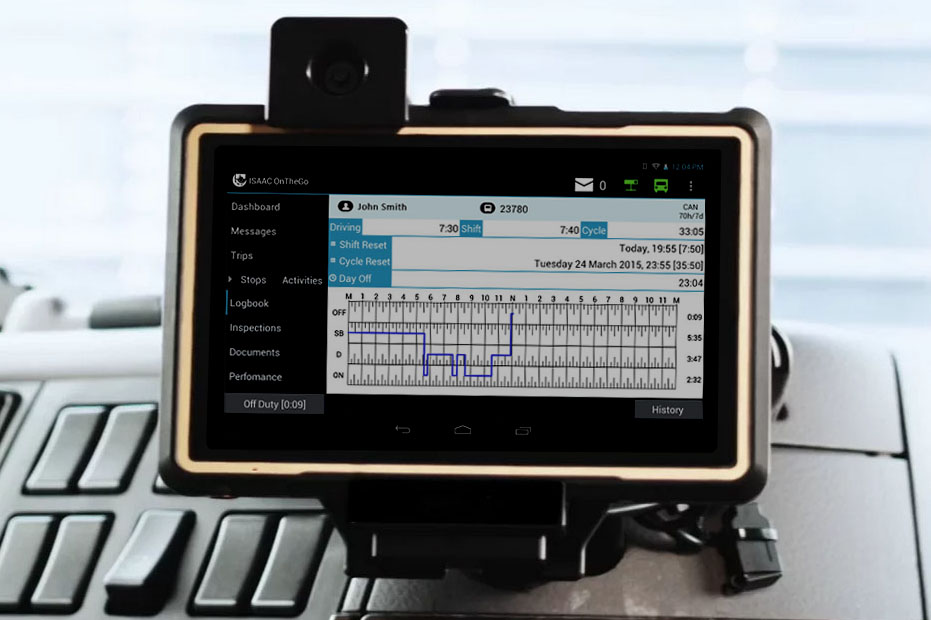
Digital tachograph

Digital tachographs appeared in Russia on 16 June 2010 (digital tachographs appeared before the specified date). Starting from 16 June 2010, the Russian Federation was supposed to implement the European digital tachography system on its territory for international transportation, but by that date the digital tachography infrastructure was not ready, as was the case in a number of other countries, as a result the first AETR digital tachograph cards were issued at the end of 2010 in accordance with the international agreement of the countries that joined the AETR. Before that date, no later than 3 months, all interested parties (drivers, inspectors, mechanics, administrators of motor transport enterprises) must be provided with special cards.

Unlike analogue devices, the disks of which were easily counterfeited, this device cannot be opened or the recorded information changed in any way. All information is recorded on an individual driver card and transmitted to the central computer of the motor transport enterprise.

Since 23 January 2012, the tachograph in Russia has become mandatory for installation and use when transporting passengers and dangerous goods. This is evidenced by the Technical Regulations on the Safety of Wheeled Vehicles in the latest edition. And since 1 April 2013, the presence of a digital tachograph has become mandatory for all wheeled transport owned by legal entities and individual entrepreneurs (including GAZelles and taxis), which is in operation on the territory of Russia, as reported in Federal Law No. 78-FZ adopted on 14 June 2012 (Article 1 and Article 12).

In accordance with Order No. 36 dated 13 February 2013 of the Ministry of Transport of Russia, the following categories and types of vehicles issued for circulation and in operation on the territory of the Russian Federation are equipped with tachographs:

- Vehicles used to carry passengers, having, in addition to the driver's seat, more than eight seats, the maximum mass of which does not exceed 5 tons (category M2);
- Vehicles used to carry passengers, having, in addition to the driver's seat, more than eight seats, the maximum mass of which exceeds 5 tons (category M3);
- Vehicles intended to carry goods, having a maximum mass of over 3.5 tons, but not more than 12 tons (category N2);
- Vehicles intended to carry goods, having a maximum mass of over 12 tons (category N3).

On 16 December 2015, the Order of the Ministry of Transport of Russia No. 348 was published, which amends order No. 273. Order No. 348 changes the deadline for equipping vehicles of categories N2, N3, M2, M3 with digital tachographs. Now vehicles must be equipped with digital tachographs by 1 July 2016.

=== European Union ===
EEC regulation 3821/85 on recording equipment in road transport from 20 December 1985 made tachographs mandatory throughout the EEC as of 29 September 1986. (Regulation 1463/70 amended by regulation 2828/77 made tachographs mandatory by 1 July 1979, reference to these regulations can be found in Regulation 3821/85).

A "European arrangement in regard to the work of driving personnel engaged in international traffic" (AETR, from French Accord Européen sur les Transports Routiers) became effective on 31 July 1985.

Regulation 561/2006/EC of the European Union, adopted on 11 April 2007, specified the driving and rest times of professional drivers. These time periods can be checked by the employers, police and other authorities with the help of the tachograph. Regulation (EU) 165/2014 of the European Parliament and of the Council on tachographs in road transport, issued on 4 February 2014, repealed Regulation 3821/85 and amended Regulation 561/2006. The 2014 regulation introduced the specification for a so-called "smart" tachograph. A "smart" tachograph records the position of a vehicle automatically via a global navigation satellite system at the places where the daily working period begins and ends, and at every three hour interval of accumulated driving.

== Operation ==
Before departure, the completed tachograph disc or driver card is inserted into the device. The driver must set the appropriate time group symbol according to the activity. The symbols mean the following:

- ⊙ – Steering wheel symbol (cannot be set on automatic tachographs): to be set when driving
- ⚒ – crossed hammers symbol: set for all other active activities outside of driving, such as loading and unloading the vehicle, repairs, washing, etc.
- ⧄ – Symbol square with diagonal line: to be set when ready for work or during waiting times, passive activities such as waiting for loading and unloading, travelling as a passenger (also in the sleeping cabin). Also applies if the journey is interrupted due to a complete road closure.
- ⑁ – Symbol bed: to be set for breaks and rest periods when the vehicle is stationary and the driver can dispose of the time as they wish.

== Analogue tachographs ==
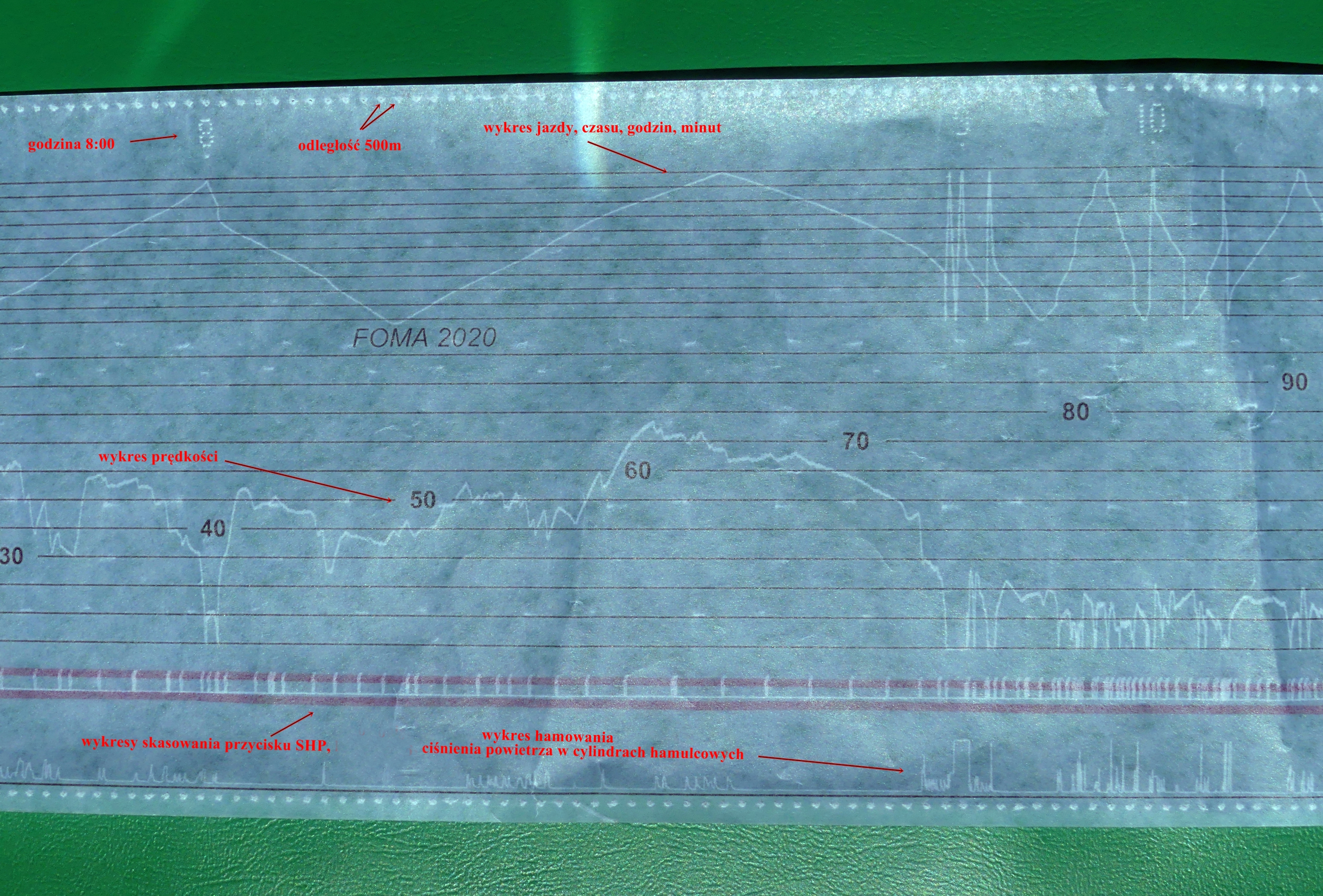
Data recording, (Hasler Bern RT-9) on tape, analogue tachograph

Most tachographs produced prior to 1 May 2006 were of the analogue type. Later analogue tachograph head models are of a modular design, enabling the head to fit into a standard DIN slot in the vehicle dashboard. This would enable a relatively easy upgrade to the forthcoming digital models, which were manufactured to the same physical dimensions.

The analogue tachograph head uses styli to trace lines on a wax coated paper disc that rotates throughout the day, where one rotation encompasses a 24-hour period. If the disc is left in the head over 24 hours, a second trace will be written onto the first, and so on until the disc is removed. It is an infringement of EU Regulation 561/2006 to use a disc for a period longer than it is designed for. Multiple overlapping traces may still be deciphered in the speed and distance fields, but it is far more difficult for the activity field where one trace can easily be obliterated by another. Analogue tachograph heads provide no indication to the driver of the need to change the disc.

Analogue data is retrieved visually, and can be assisted by manual analysis tools. Analogue discs can also be electronically scanned and analysed by computer, although this analogue to digital conversion process still requires human expert interpretation for best results, due to imperfections in the source disc such as dirt and scratch marks in the wax surface that can be incorrectly read as trace marks.

=== The analogue chart (EU) ===
The analogue chart must be EU type approved. The country of type approval can be found on the rear of the chart, i.e. a mark of E11 would indicate the chart to have been approved in the UK for use in the EU. The chart is manufactured out of heavyweight paper with a black printed face that is thinly coated with a white wax, upon which is printed a number of features. The surface can be scratched or rubbed to reveal the black paper underneath. This enables the traces to be made without the use of ink. The chart features a pear-shaped aperture in the centre, ensuring it is perfectly aligned upon insertion into the tachograph head. There is no facility to prevent it being inserted back to front, where the styli would be prevented from making contact with the wax surface.

The centrefield is used by the driver to store certain handwritten information. This includes the drivers name, the date(s) the disc refers to, the start and end odometer readings and the registration mark of the vehicle.

Three traces are made in the wax surface by the head. These traces are either made by three separate styli or a single multipurpose stylus.

The trace closest to the centrefield is the distance trace. The stylus moves up and down with distance travelled, producing a zig-zag pattern, often referred to as a 'V' trace. A complete deflection is created every 5 kilometres, and therefore each completed 'V' represents 10 kilometres travelled. By counting the zig-zags, the total distance travelled can be calculated and compared against the stated odometer readings in the centrefield. By comparing the end position of the trace for a particular day against the start position for the following day, it can be seen if the vehicle has moved in the intermediate period.

The trace in the central area is the mode trace. The driver's activity is displayed in this area, and is always displayed as either drive, other work, availability or rest. Earlier tachograph heads displayed the mode as a thin line in one of four concentric tracks within the activity band. These heads are known as manual heads as the activity was manually selected using the mode switch. Automatic heads succeeded manual heads, and differ from them in two main areas. Firstly, the automatic head will always display the drive mode when the vehicle is in motion, regardless of the setting of the mode switch. For this reason, the drive mode is no longer available to be selected by the mode switch. Secondly, the activity is displayed on the chart as a sequence of block traces of differing thickness. The rest mode appears as a thin line, availability as a slightly thicker line, other work as slightly thicker again and the drive trace being the thickest.

The trace closest to the outer edge is the speed trace. The disc is preprinted with a speed scale and the stylus produces a mark corresponding with the speed of the vehicle at any given time. It is important that the maximum speed (V_{max}) specification of the chart matches that of the tachograph head for the speed to be correctly recorded. It can be expected that a high speed trace will correlate with a tightly spaced zig-zag pattern within the distance trace.

The disc is preprinted with a 24-hour scale that completes the outer circumference.

The rear face of the chart is printed with a grid that enables the driver to make handwritten additions or amendments to the information on the front.

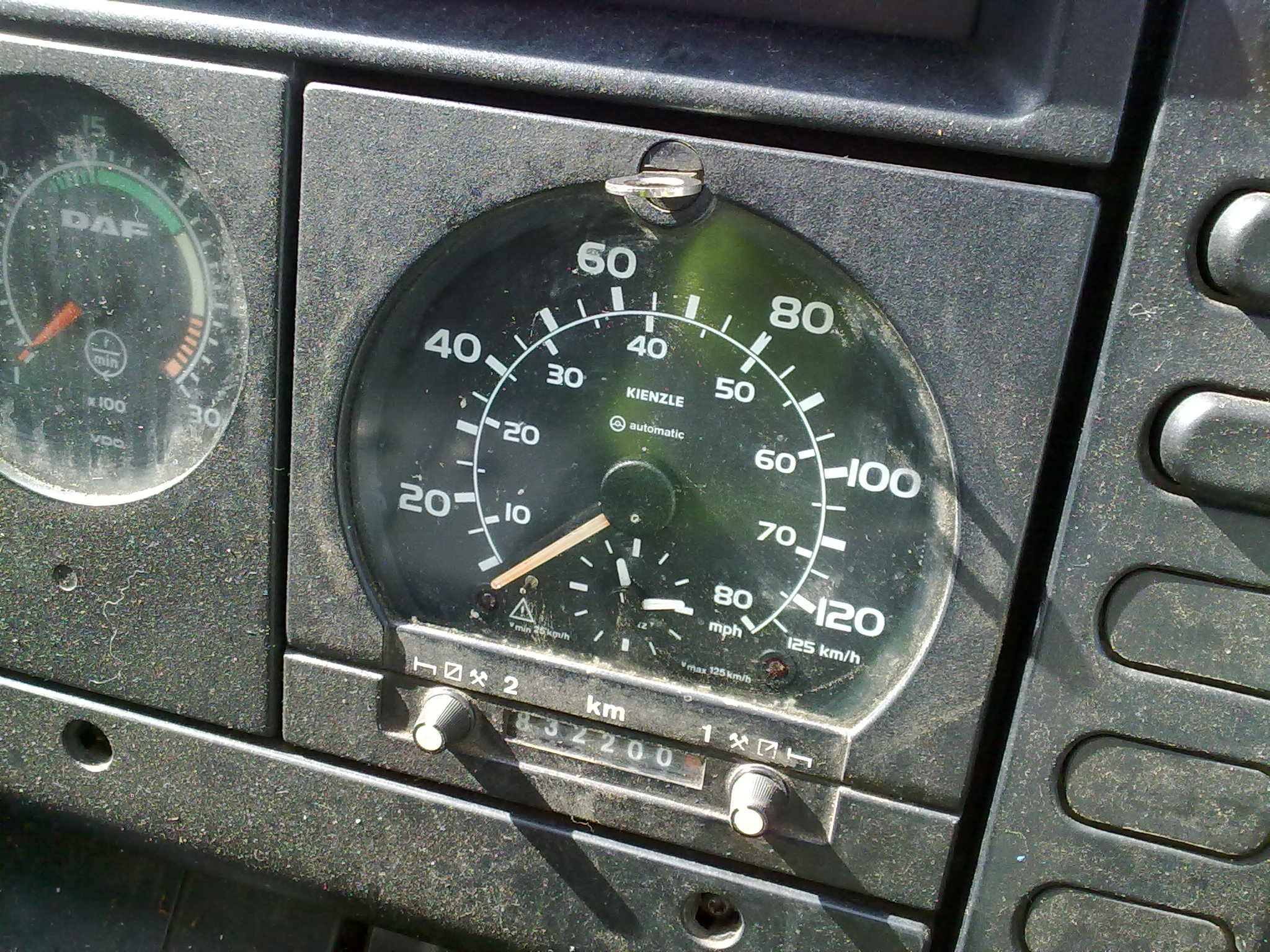
VDO Kienzle 1318

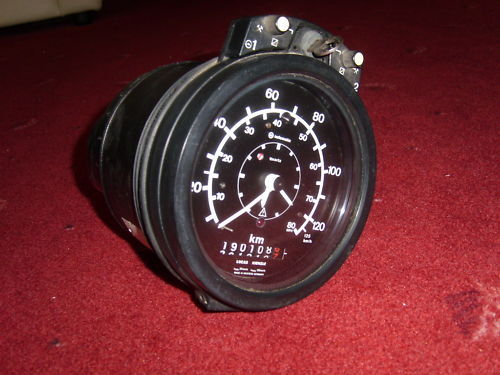
Kienzle 1314

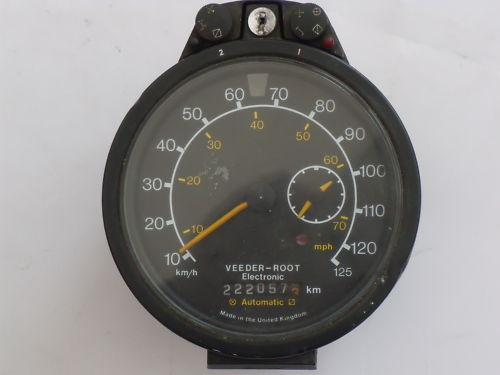
Veeder Root 1426

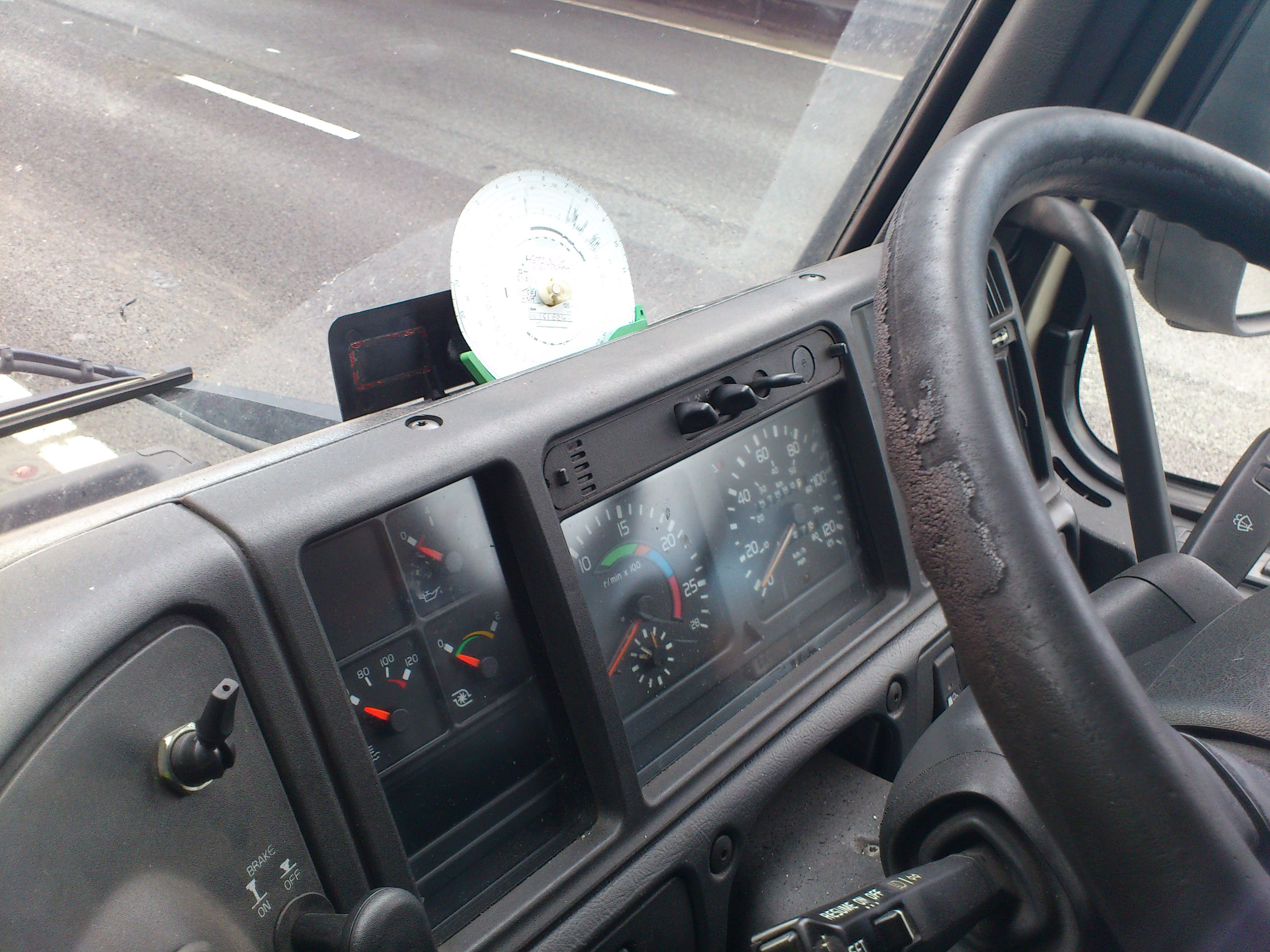
Motometer

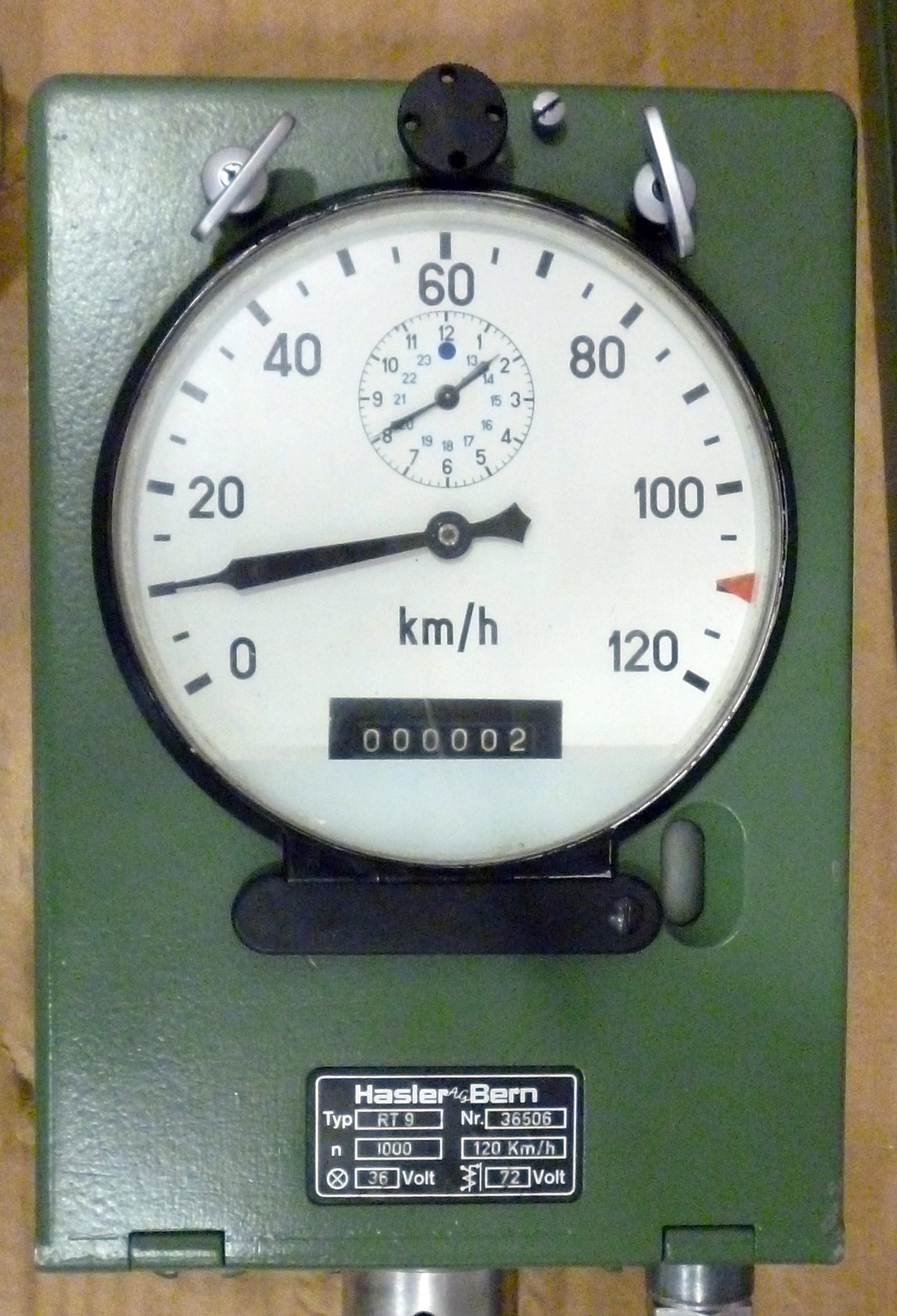
Hasler Bern, mechanical tachograph (analogue) of a rail vehicle

== Its use in accident investigation ==
Apart from enforcing regulations, tachographs are often used in Germany to investigate and punish speeding. This practice was approved by the German high regional court in the 1990s. Also, after an accident, the discs are often examined with a microscope to discover the events that took place at a collision site.

== Tampering ==
Tachographs can be tampered with in various ways, such as slightly twisting the marker, blocking the path of the arm with a piece of rubber or foam, short-circuiting the unit for short periods, intentionally preventing the detection of gear movement with a magnet, or interrupting the (older analogue) tachograph's power supply with a blown fuse to stop operation completely thus recording no information whatsoever. There is also "forgetting to insert" the chart when beginning duty. Unauthorised changing of the discs (and then discarding one of the two, so that some activities are "forgotten") is well known throughout Europe. "Ghosting" is another common trick when false driver information is entered onto a second chart to give the appearance that there is a second driver present in the long-distance runs that cannot be completed within a single driver's daily driving period.

== Digital tachographs ==
=== Introduction of the digital tachograph in the EU ===
Digital tachographs make tampering much more difficult by sending signals in an encrypted manner. EU regulation 1360/2002 makes digital tachographs mandatory for all vehicles described in the above section Regulations and manufactured after 1 August 2005. Digital tachographs have been required as of 1 May 2006 for all new vehicles for which EWG regulation VO(EWG)3820/85 applies, as was published in the official newsletter of the European Union L102 from 11 April 2006.

Digital tachographs have been implemented in Mexico since 1994, but this is not a federal regulation. The last implementations developed in Mexico have GPS capabilities such as mapping, altitude and location-activated video triggering.

== See also ==
- Event data recorder
- Electronic Logging Devices, comparable device used in the US and Canada
- Odometer
- Tachometer
- Taximeter
