= Drivers' working hours =

Legal term

Drivers' working hours is the commonly used term for regulations that govern the activities of the drivers of commercial goods vehicles and passenger carrying vehicles. In the United States, they are known as hours of service.

Within the European Union, Directive 2002/15/EC defines the rules regarding working time for drivers carrying out road transport activities in the European Union from the point of view of improving road safety, health and safety of drivers and ensure fair competition among transport operators. Working time of mobile workers is a strictly national obligation to implement and to check and it cannot be imposed to drivers from third countries. Regulation (EC) 561/2006 is the regulation complementing the aforementioned Directive in view of driving times, breaks and rest periods required to be taken by professional drivers of vehicles carrying goods or passengers in international or national transport operations. There are special circumstances when carriages and thus drivers may be exempt from the Directive 2002/15/EC. The Regulation (EC) 561/2006 applies to the carriage by road of goods by vehicles with a total mass exceeding 3.5 tonnes and to the transport by road of passengers by vehicles that are adapted to carry more than nine people (including the driver). It applies, irrespective of the country of registration of the vehicle, to carriage by road in the EU and between EU countries, Switzerland and European Economic Area countries. The Regulation exempts from its scope of application ten categories of carriages (Art. 3), but there are also specific national exemptions offered in Art. 13. Though EU countries have to inform the Commission of those specific national exemptions.

UNECE have adopted in 1970 the European Agreement Concerning the Work of Crews of Vehicles Engaged in International Road Transport (AETR). This Agreement is common for EU, EEA countries, and Switzerland as well as other non-EU countries of the European continent. All vehicles crossing an AETR signatory country during its transport operations (carriages) should obey the common rules set by the AETR agreement.

Since September 2010, AETR rules have been amended to align closely with EU Regulation 561/2006.

Under certain circumstances, drivers may instead fall within scope of the domestic rules of that country.

In addition to the above requirements, drivers in the EU must also abide with the European Working Time Directive 2003/88/EC.

== Regulations ==
In the European Union, drivers' working hours are regulated by EU regulation (EC) No 561/2006 which entered into force on 11 April 2007.

Driving time and breaks

The cumulative driving time without taking a break must not exceed 4.5 hours. Before surpassing 4.5 hours of cumulated driving time, the driver must take a break period of at least 45 minutes. However, this can be split into 2 breaks, the first being at least 15 minutes, and the second being at least 30 minutes in length.

The daily driving time shall not exceed 9 hours. The daily driving time may be extended to at most 10 hours not more than twice during the week. The weekly driving time may not exceed 56 hours. In addition to this, a driver cannot exceed 90 hours driving in a fortnight.

Daily rest

Within each period of 24 hours after the end of the previous daily/weekly rest period a driver must take a new daily rest period. An 11-hour (or more) daily rest is called a regular daily rest period. Alternatively, a driver can split a regular daily rest period into two periods. The first period must be at least 3 hours of uninterrupted rest and can be taken at any time during the day. The second must be at least 9 hours of uninterrupted rest, giving a total minimum rest of 12 hours.

A driver may reduce his daily rest period to no less than 9 continuous hours, but this can be done no more than three times between any two weekly rest periods; no compensation for the reduction is required. A daily rest that is less than 11 hours but at least 9 hours long is called a reduced daily rest period.

'Multi-manning'

The situation where, during each period of driving between any two consecutive daily rest periods, or between a daily rest period and a weekly rest period, there are at least two drivers in the vehicle to do the driving. For the first hour of multi-manning the presence of another driver or drivers is optional, but for the remainder of the period it is compulsory. This allows for a vehicle to depart from its operating centre and collect a second driver along the way, providing that this is done within 1 hour of the first driver starting work.

Vehicles manned by two or more drivers are governed by the same rules that apply to single-manned vehicles, apart from the daily rest requirements.

Where a vehicle is manned by two or more drivers, each driver must have a daily rest period of at least 9 consecutive hours within the 30-hour period that starts at the end of the last daily or weekly rest period. Organising drivers' duties in such a fashion enables a crew's duties to be spread over 21 hours. The maximum driving time for a two-man crew taking advantage of this concession is 20 hours before a daily rest is required (although only if both drivers are entitled to drive 10 hours). Under multi-manning, the 'second' driver in a crew may not necessarily be the same driver from the duration of the first driver's shift but could in principle be any number of drivers as long as the conditions are met. Whether these second drivers could claim the multi-manning concession in these circumstances would depend on their other duties.

On a multi-manning operation the first 45 minutes of a period of availability will be considered to be a break, so long as the co-driver does no work.

Journeys involving ferry or train transport

Where a driver accompanies a vehicle that is being transported by ferry or train, the daily rest requirements are more flexible. A regular daily rest period may be interrupted no more than twice, but the total interruption must not exceed 1 hour in total. This allows for a vehicle to be driven on to a ferry and off again at the end of the crossing. Where the rest period is interrupted in this way, the total accumulated rest period must still be 11 hours. A bunk or couchette must be available during the rest period.

Weekly rest

A regular weekly rest period is a period of at least 45 consecutive hours. An actual working week starts at the end of a weekly rest period, and finishes when another weekly rest period is commenced. A weekly rest can start at any hour, during any day of the calendar week (Monday–Sunday). This is perfectly acceptable – the working week is not required to be aligned with the 'fixed' (calendar) week defined in the rules, provided all the relevant limits are complied with.

Alternatively, a driver can take a reduced weekly rest period of a minimum of 24 consecutive hours. If a reduction is taken, it must be compensated for by an equivalent period of rest taken in one block before the end of the third week following the week in question. The compensating rest must be attached to a period of rest of at least 9 hours – in effect either a weekly or a daily rest period.

For example, where a driver reduces a weekly rest period to 33 hours in week 1, he must compensate for this by attaching a 12-hour period of rest to another rest period of at least 9 hours before the end of week 4. This compensation cannot be taken in several smaller periods. A weekly rest period that falls in two weeks may be counted in either week but not in both. However, a rest period of at least 69 hours in total may be counted as two back-to-back weekly rests (e.g. a 45-hour weekly rest followed by 24 hours). A weekly rest period shall start no later than 144 hours (6 periods of 24 hours) from the end of the previous weekly rest period.

Regular weekly rest periods and weekly rest periods of at least 45 consecutive hours (taken in compensation for a previous reduction) cannot be taken in a vehicle. They must be taken provide suitable gender-friendly accommodation with adequate sleeping and sanitary facilities, and the employer must cover any costs of the accommodation.

Unforeseen events

Provided that road safety is not jeopardised, and to enable a driver to reach a suitable stopping place, a departure from the EU rules may be permitted to the extent necessary to ensure the safety of persons, the vehicle or its load. Drivers must note all the reasons for doing so on the back of their tachograph record sheets (if using an analogue tachograph) or on a printout or temporary sheet (if using a digital tachograph) at the latest on reaching the suitable stopping place (see relevant sections covering manual entries). Repeated and regular occurrences, however, might indicate to enforcement officers that employers were not in fact scheduling work to enable compliance with the applicable rules.

== Parties to the AETR ==
- Albania
- Andorra
- Armenia
- Austria
- Azerbaijan
- Belarus
- Belgium
- Bosnia and Herzegovina
- Bulgaria
- Croatia
- Cyprus
- Czech Republic
- Denmark
- Estonia
- Finland
- France
- Georgia
- Germany
- Greece
- Hungary
- Ireland
- Israel
- Italy
- Kazakhstan
- Kyrgyzstan
- Latvia
- Liechtenstein
- Lithuania
- Luxembourg
- Malta
- Monaco
- Montenegro
- Netherlands
- North Macedonia
- Norway
- Poland
- Portugal
- Moldova
- Romania
- Russia
- San Marino
- Serbia
- Slovakia
- Slovenia
- Spain
- Sweden
- Switzerland
- Tajikistan
- Turkey
- Turkmenistan
- Ukraine
- United Kingdom
- Uzbekistan

== Tachograph ==
An approved tachograph is the required instrument by which the activity of drivers subject to the EU or AETR drivers' hours rules, the vehicle's speed and distance, and the time are recorded. There are two main types of tachograph – analogue and digital.

== See also ==
- Tachograph
- Digital tachograph
- European Working Time Directive 2003/88/EC
- United States - Hours of Service
- New Zealand - Work-time
