= Work-time =

New Zealand equivalent of drivers' working hours

Work-time is the New Zealand equivalent of drivers' working hours, or time spent doing work-related tasks in an occupation subject to Land Transport Rule Work Time and Logbooks 2007, Rule 62001.

== Work-time application ==
The rules are applied to drivers and transport operators and govern maximum periods of work time and minimum rest times. The rules apply if, at any time during a cumulative work period, a person drives or operates a vehicle that:

- requires a class 2, 3, 4 or 5 heavy vehicle driver licence, or
- is driven or operated in a transport service (other than a rental service), or
- is used in circumstances in which the vehicle must, or ought to be operated under a transport service licence, or
- is used to carry goods for hire or reward.

== Exemptions ==
There are numerous potential exemptions to work-time requirements where any of the following applies. It is a:

- vehicle which requires a class 1 or 2 licence and is used within a 50km radius of the operator's usual business location or from a "base of operations" (a site office established for at least 24 hours, or a local depot to which drivers report daily)
- vehicle not used for hire or reward
- school bus
- police or army vehicle
- motorhome
- mobile crane
- vintage heavy vehicle
- special-type vehicle such as a forklift truck, road roller or roadside maintenance vehicle
- vehicle recovery service vehicle
- urban bus

== Logbooks and time-keeping ==
All drivers of vehicles subject to work-time rules must keep one current logbook in the vehicle while driving. The logbook must be up-to-date to the most recent period of rest time. Drivers complete a logbook course as part of class 2 heavy vehicle licence training.

Paper logbooks are available in two variants:

- Heavy vehicle (vehicles over 3500kg)
- Small passenger service vehicle (e.g. taxi)

They are triplicate (employee) or duplicate (self-employed). Each logbook sheet has a white top copy, a yellow duplicate for the employer and a pink copy that may be requested by enforcement officers.

Electronic logbooks are available and must be approved by NZ Transport Agency. They are seen as a way to avoid falsification of logbook records.

Completed logbooks must be kept for at least 12 months after the date of the last entry.

=== Work-time limits ===
Drivers and operators are permitted to work up to 5.5 hours before they must take a rest period of at least 30 minutes; taxi drivers taking short fares can work up to 7 hours before taking a break. The maximum number of work hours before a minimum break of 10 hours is taken is 13. This is called the cumulative work day. Work-time can be extended through:

- unavoidable delays
- civil emergency
- essential repair work
- authorised work-time variations

The maximum number of work hours before a minimum break of 24 hours is taken is 70. There are no exemptions or exceptions. This is called the cumulative work period.

Secondary employment is counted towards the cumulative work day and cumulative work time.
