= Federal Motor Carrier Safety Administration =

Agency of the US Department of Transportation

- FMCSA logo

Agency overview
- Formed: January 1, 2000; 26 years ago
- Jurisdiction: United States government
- Headquarters: Washington, D.C.
- Employees: 1,000
- Annual budget: $926.6 million (Fiscal Year 2026, budget estimate)
- Agency executives: Derek Barrs, Administrator; Jesse Elison, Deputy Administrator
- Parent agency: United States Department of Transportation
- Website: Federal Motor Carrier Safety Administration Website

The Federal Motor Carrier Safety Administration (FMCSA) is an agency in the United States Department of Transportation that regulates the trucking industry in the United States. The primary mission of the FMCSA is to reduce crashes, injuries, and fatalities involving large trucks and buses.

== History ==
The agency was established as a separate administration within U.S. Department of Transportation on January 1, 2000, pursuant to the "Motor Carrier Safety Improvement Act of 1999." FMCSA is headquartered in Washington, D.C., and employs more than 1,000 people in all 50 states and the District of Columbia, with the goal of making "roadways safer for the public and the CMV industry".

== Leadership ==
Raymond P. Martinez was sworn in as administrator of the FMCSA on February 28, 2018. Previously, Martinez served as chairman and chief administrator of the New Jersey Motor Vehicle Commission. He left office on October 31, 2019, and the post has been without a permanent occupant ever since.

Cathy F. Gautreaux became the agency's deputy administrator in November 2019 after having served as the executive director of the Louisiana Motor Transportation Association for 29 years. She left office on January 20, 2021.

=== List of administrators ===
Administrator	Term started	Term ended
Joseph M. Clapp	October 4, 2001	December 2002
Annette Sandberg	August 5, 2003	March 1, 2006
John H. Hill	August 10, 2006	January 20, 2009
Anne S. Ferro	November 13, 2009	August 15, 2014
Scott Darling	August 16, 2014	January 20, 2017
Raymond P. Martinez	February 20, 2018	October 31, 2019
Jim Mullen (acting)	October 31, 2019	August 29, 2020
Wiley Deck (acting)	August 30, 2020	January 20, 2021
Meera Joshi (acting)	January 20, 2021	January 1, 2022
Jack Van Steenburg (acting)	January 1, 2022	January 19, 2022
Robin Hutcheson	January 19, 2022	September 26, 2022 (acting)
Robin Hutcheson	September 26, 2022	January 26, 2024
Sue Lawless (acting)	January 26, 2024	June 25, 2024
Vinn White (acting)	June 25, 2024	January 20, 2025
Sue Lawless (acting)	January 20, 2025	March 7, 2025
Adrienne Camire (acting)	March 7, 2025	March 21, 2025
Sue Lawless (acting)	March 21, 2025	July 23, 2025
Jesse Ellison (acting)	July 23, 2025	October 8, 2025
Derek Barrs	October 8, 2025	Present

== Organization ==
The FMCSA is divided into eight offices:

- Office of the Administrator: MC-A
- Office of Administration: MC-M
- Office of Chief Counsel: MC-C
- Office of Chief Financial Officer: MC-B
- Office of Safety: MC-S
- Office of Policy: MC-P
- Office of Research and Registration: MC-R

== Main programs ==
=== Compliance, Safety, Accountability (CSA) ===
Compliance, Safety, Accountability (CSA) is described by FMCSA as its "data-driven safety compliance and enforcement program designed to improve safety and prevent commercial motor vehicle crashes, injuries, and fatalities". This program oversees carriers' safety performance through roadside inspections and crash investigations, issuing violations when instances of noncompliance with safety regulations are uncovered. The Agency's safety investigation team and state law enforcement partners are small compared to the millions of CMV companies and commercial driver license (CDL) holders nationwide. A key component of the CSA program – known as the Safety Measurement System (SMS) – relies on data analysis to identify non-compliant and unsafe companies to prioritize them for enforcement interventions.

While the methodology for calculating SMS safety scores has evolved over time in response to suggestions from stakeholders, the program has proven effective at identifying unsafe, high-risk carriers. FMCSA is expected to publicly release additional changes to SMS designed to strengthen the Agency's ability to identify companies for investigation before they are involved in a crash. The program's future remains in doubt as it has been the subject of heavy criticism from the DOT's own Inspector General, the Government Accountability Office, and Congress itself in the FAST Act. That Act requires the National Research Council of the National Academies of Science (NAS) to conduct a thorough study of the Compliance, Safety, Accountability (CSA) program, specifically the Safety Measurement System (SMS).

=== Hours of Service (HOS) and Driver Restart Study ===
In July 2013, FMCSA updated HOS regulation to help reduce the incidence of CMV driver fatigue on the nation's roadways. The final rule required truck drivers who use the "34-hour restart" provision to maximize their weekly work hours to limit the restart to once a week and to include in the restart period at least two nights off duty from 1:00 to 5:00 a.m., when one's 24-hour body clock supposedly needs and benefits from sleep the most.

In December 2014, Congress passed the FAST Act, which suspended the new 34-hour restart provision in the HOS rule and instructed FMCSA to study its effectiveness. In 2015, FMCSA selected Virginia Tech Transportation Institute (VTTI) to conduct the largest naturalistic study of its kind that the Agency had ever undertaken. FMCSA released the findings to Congress in March 2017. The study was unable to demonstrate that the 2013 restart rule provided a greater net benefit compared to the previous rule.

=== National Registry ===
Implemented in 2014, the National Registry rule requires all Medical Examiners (ME) who conduct physical examinations and issue medical certifications for interstate CMV drivers to complete training on FMCSA's physical qualification standards, pass a certification test, and demonstrate competence through periodic training and testing. CMV drivers whose medical certifications expire must use MEs on the National Registry for their examinations.

=== Entry-Level Driver Training (ELDT) ===
FMCSA’s Entry Level Driver Training (ELDT) regulations set a baseline set of minimum training requirements for entry-level commercial motor vehicle (CMV) drivers. These regulations also created a Training Provider Registry (TPR) to retain a record of which CDL applicants have completed the new ELDT training and certification process.

Since 2022 ELDT regulations apply to all individuals obtaining a commercial driver's license, upgrading an existing CDL license, or obtaining a passenger, school bus, or hazmat endorsement. As of Feb. 7, 2022 training providers are required to register with the TPR and upload documents to confirm applicants for CDL licenses have met the EDLT minimum standards.

== CSA overhaul ==
In 2015 a Congressional mandate, that was part of the Fixing America's Surface Transportation Act (FAST Act), directed a full review of the CSA program by the Inspector General of the U.S. Department of Transportation and the National Academy of Sciences (NAS). The review (study) was named the "Correlation Study Corrective Action Plan". The FMCSA had already started implementing changes in the CSA but withdrew these after the study was published.

Fleet mileage will be included in the new plan and the FMCSA will study sharing information with the International Registration Plan (IRP) and International Fuel Tax Agreement (IFTA) organizations with consideration of incentives for voluntary mileage updates. The FMCSA will partner with the National Highway Traffic Safety Administration in getting states to participate in uniform crash reporting standards.

In September 2018 the FMCSA began small-scale testing using an Item Response Theory (IRT) model to replace the Safety Measurement System with plans for full testing in 2019. The FMCSA currently uses percentile comparisons (relative rankings) of similar fleets when computing the "Behavioral Analysis and Safety Improvement Categories" (BASIC) scores but will study if absolute measures of safety should be used instead. The Safety Measurement System (SMS) website was changed in September 2018 with certain previous public information on property carrier's compliance and safety performance information now withheld. Ten organizations, including the American Trucking Association (ATA), Truckload Carriers Association (TCA), and OOIDA, co-signed a letter to then Department of Transportation Secretary Anthony Foxx, requesting that CSA scores not be available to the public. Industry concerns have long been that the CSA scoring is "highly defective", has inconsistencies with the Safety Measurement System, and has "significant shortcomings".

=== Concerns ===
Shippers and brokers have used the CSA scores as a bench-mark to find safe carriers. With this hidden there may be more calls for legislation establishing uniform federal standards for qualifying carriers. House Bill H.R.1568 was introduced, that was referred to the subcommittee of the Subcommittee on Highways and Transit, and Senate Bill S.1345 was introduced, that was read twice and referred to the Committee on Commerce, Science, and Transportation. The insurance industry also used the CSA scores to evaluate the overall fitness and risk profile of carriers and drivers.

The American Transportation Research Institute (ATRI) released a report in 2015 criticizing the CSA scoring, citing that a lack of "crash accountability or crash weighting in CSA has long-plagued the program", negatively affecting scores on crashes that are not the fault of the carrier or driver. The ATRI report found that negative scores resulted from trucks colliding with an animal in the roadway, another driver hitting a legally parked truck, another driver running a red light or stop sign and hitting a truck, another driver being under the influence of drugs or alcohol and hitting a truck, and truck-assisted suicide by a pedestrian and that non-preventable crashes needs to be removed from carriers' CSA records.

== Consumer protection initiatives ==
=== "Look Before You Book" ===
FMCSA's "Look Before You Book" campaign encourages trip planners and passengers to think about more than price and to consider safety first when choosing bus companies and drivers. The program features DOT's first app – SaferBus – that provides safety data on each bus company under FMCSA's jurisdiction. The primary audiences for this campaign are travel planners that serve faith-based organizations, seniors and student groups.

=== Protect Your Move ===
Of the estimated 35 million Americans who move each year, about 600,000 hire a company to move their household goods across state lines. FMCSA receives about 3,000 complaints annually about deceptive practices and fraud by dishonest operators.

== See also ==
- United States Department of Transportation
- Motor carrier safety rating
- Freight broker bond

== Sources ==
1. Federal Motor Carrier Safety Administration - About Us

2. Federal Motor Carrier Safety Administration - Key Programs

3. Comprehensive Safety Analysis 2010
