= Trucking industry in the United States =

American industry

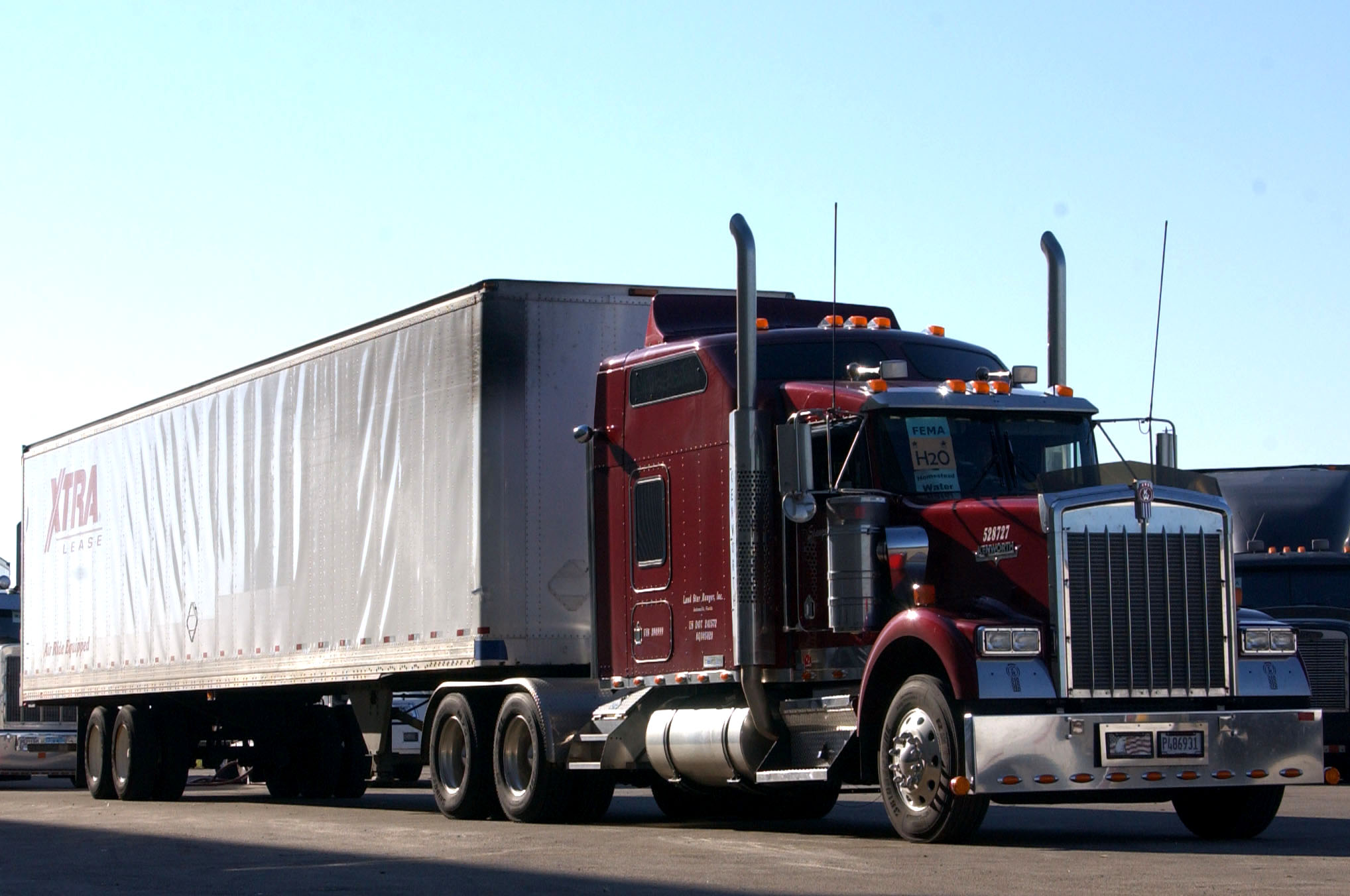
A common property-carrying commercial vehicle in the United States is the tractor-trailer, also known as an "18-wheeler" or "semi".

The trucking industry serves the American economy by transporting large quantities of raw materials, works in process, and finished goods over land—typically from manufacturing plants to retail distribution centers. Trucks are also used in the construction industry. Dump trucks and concrete mixers are required to transport rocks, dirt, concrete, and other building materials used in construction. Trucks in America are responsible for the majority of freight movement over land and are used in the manufacturing, transportation, and warehousing industries.

Driving large trucks requires a commercial driver's license (CDL). Drivers of commercial motor vehicles (CMVs) must adhere to the hours of service, which are regulations governing the driving hours of commercial drivers. Drivers must be at least 21 years old to drive on the interstates, with efforts being made to reduce the age to 18. These and all other rules regarding the safety of interstate commercial driving are issued by the Federal Motor Carrier Safety Administration (FMCSA). The FMCSA is a division of the United States Department of Transportation (USDOT), which governs all transportation-related industries such as trucking, shipping, railroads, and airlines. Some other issues are handled by another branch of the USDOT, the Federal Highway Administration (FHWA).

Developments in technology, such as computers, satellite communication, and the Internet, have increased the productivity of company operations and provided more accessible forms of entertainment to truckers who often spend long periods of time away from home. In 2006, the United States Environmental Protection Agency implemented revised emission standards for diesel trucks (reducing airborne pollutants emitted by diesel engines) which promises to improve air quality and public health.

== History ==
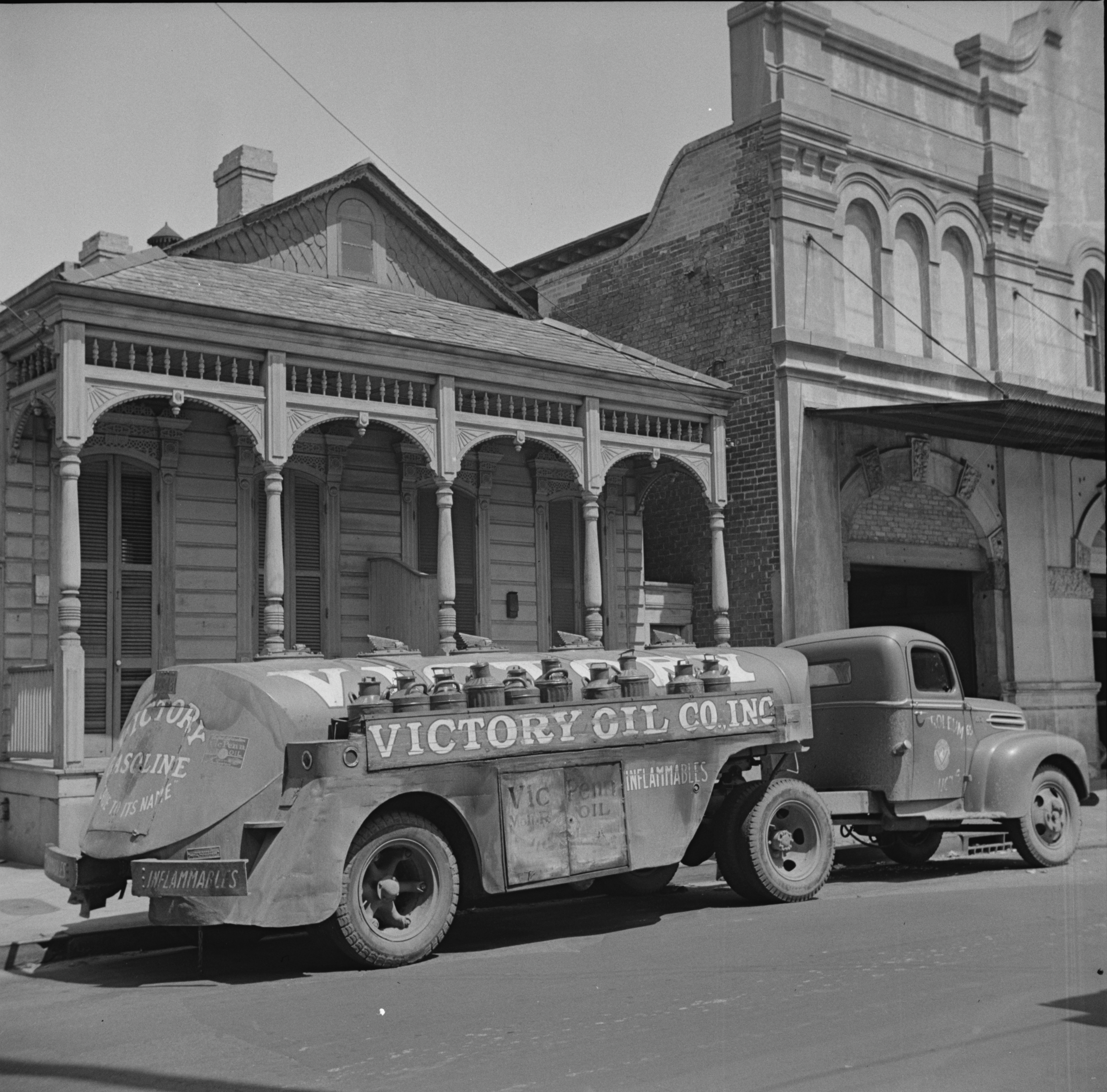
A "Victory Oil" semi-trailer truck from 1943

The trucking industry has affected the political and economic history of the United States in the 20th century. Before the invention of automobiles, most freight was moved by train or horse-drawn vehicle.

The number of trucks rose steadily over the period 1900-1920. In 1904, there were 700 trucks in the United States, whereas by 1920, there were approximately 1,1 million trucks. During this time period, trucks were an effective substitute for short-haul railroading. The nascent trucking industry benefitted from hidden subsidies (such as government funding of road construction and maintenance) and from an absence of the kinds of regulations that limited profitability in the railroad sector.

Trucks were first used extensively by the military during World War I. With the increase in construction of paved roads, trucking began to achieve a significant foothold in the 1930s. Public safety concerns made it necessary to implement various government regulations (such as the 1965 hours of service rule, later revised with a compliance date of July 1, 2012) of how long drivers were allowed to work and drive each day/week. In 1956, Taxpayers provided funds to build the Interstate Highway System, an extensive network of highways and freeways that linked major cities across the continent. The addition of Interstate Highway System also made it possible for the trucking industry to grow substantially in the late 1950s and early 1960s and trucking has come to dominate the freight industry in the latter portion of the 20th century.

Trucking achieved national attention during the 1960s and 70s when songs and movies about truck driving were major hits. Truck drivers participated in widespread strikes against the rising cost of fuel, during the energy crises of 1973 and 1979. Congress deregulated the trucking industry with the passage of the Motor Carrier Act of 1980.

== 1990s-present ==
Advances in modern technology have enabled significant improvements within the trucking industry. Trucks are commonly equipped with satellite communication features, automatic transmissions are gaining in popularity, and truck stops featuring WiFi Internet access are now commonplace.

=== Exhaust emissions ===
The Interstate Highway system (2007)

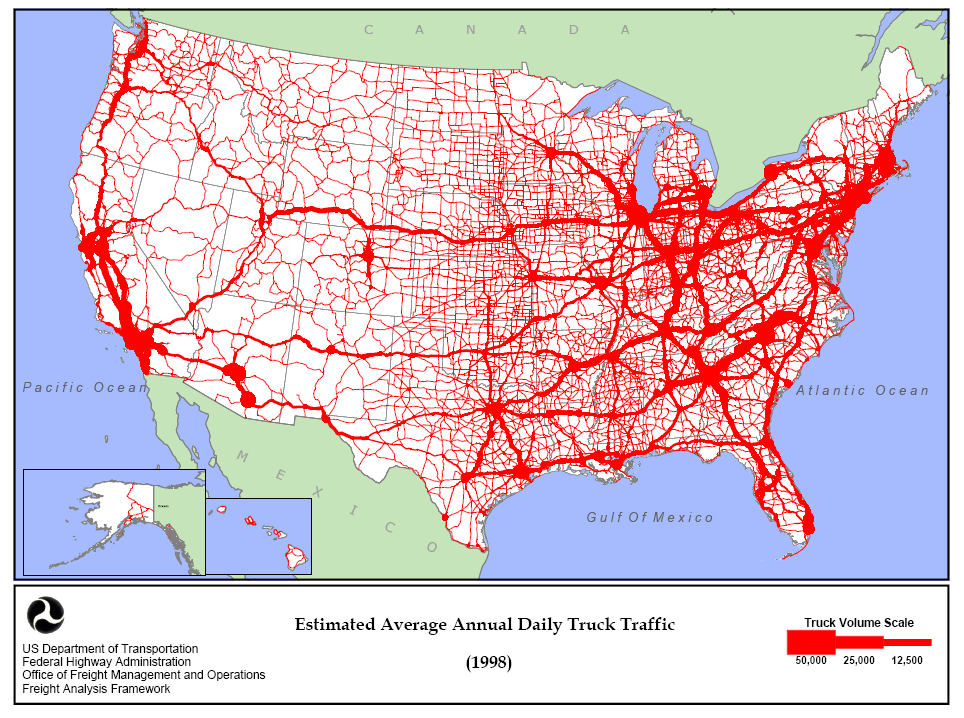
Estimated average annual daily truck traffic for Interstate and major US Highways (1998)

Components of diesel exhaust were confirmed as an animal carcinogen in 1988 by the National Institute for Occupational Safety and Health, and by 2002, the U.S. Environmental Protection Agency (EPA) considered it "likely to be carcinogenic to humans". The particulate matter of diesel exhaust has been linked to (among other health effects) lung cancer, chronic bronchitis, and aggravated asthma; it has also been identified as a greenhouse gas. " For these and other reasons, alternatives and improvements to standard diesel fuel have been developed.

Biodiesel (in its pure form) is a non-toxic, biodegradable form of diesel fuel made from vegetable oil, usually soybean oil or recycled restaurant grease. Biodiesel promises a reduction in some exhaust emissions, as well as reduced dependence on foreign petroleum supplies.

Starting in June 2006, petroleum refiners were required by the EPA to begin producing ultra-low sulfur diesel (ULSD) fuel, which has 97% less sulfur than the previous low sulfur diesel fuel. When fuel containing sulfur is burned, sulfur dioxide is produced, a main component of acid rain. ULSD, together with new air pollution control technologies required in trucks (starting with model year 2007), will reduce harmful emissions by 90%.

By the time the action is fully implemented, the EPA estimates that 2.6 million tons of smog-causing nitrogen oxide emissions will be eliminated each year. Soot or particulate matter will be reduced by an estimated 110,000 tons a year. The reduction in sulfur will also prevent an estimated 8,300 premature deaths, 5,500 cases of chronic bronchitis and 17,600 cases of acute bronchitis in children. In addition, an estimated 360,000 asthma attacks and 386,000 cases of respiratory symptoms in asthmatic children will also be avoided every year.

When not driving, truck drivers need to idle their engines to maintain climate control within the truck cab (interior), as well as provide electricity for appliances. Engine idling is inefficient and only adds to the problem of air pollution. This unnecessary idling can be remedied with shore power (which is a term and idea borrowed from the shipping industry), or Truck Stop Electrification. When ships are docked in a port, they connect to a land-based power supply to provide electricity and eliminate the need to idle their engines. The idea of shore power was transferred to the trucking industry, and now there are companies such as IdleAire and Shorepower which provide electricity to diesel trucks, which eliminates the need for the driver to idle the engine. IdleAire also provides access to the Internet, cable television, and land line phone services. IdleAire promises to eliminate one-eighth of nitrogen oxide pollution through "electrified parking", however, particulate pollution may increase in those areas where the electricity is provided by coal burning power plants. Some drivers are also experimenting with hydrogen fuel cells, which provide clean and silent power for appliances when trucks are not running.

=== Fuel efficiency ===
With the fuel price increases of the 2000s, the EPA and many companies have sought to increase diesel truck fuel economy. One such example is the hydraulic hybrid vehicle, which stores energy in hydraulic tanks and hydraulic motors (as opposed to the electric hybrid vehicle which uses batteries and regenerative brakes). Electric hybrid vehicles are another option, with savings of 35% to 60% over traditional vehicles. Drivers themselves may improve fuel efficiency by using a method called progressive shifting, in which the driver shifts through the gears (typical trucks may have between 10 and 18 gears) in such a manner as to optimize the power range of the engine.

Pure electric trucks that claim zero emissions are also being increasingly deployed in US fleets across industries. These trucks run purely on electric power without any dependence on fossil fuels. As of February 2022, there were over 1,000 all-electric trucks deployed in the United States from manufacturers such as Hyundai, Orange EV, MAN Truck & Bus, and E-FORCE ONE. The braking system in these trucks are designed to put the energy that is normally lost as heat in the brake pads and drum back into the battery by using the motor as a generator.

=== Fuel consumption ===
According to research from a survey conducted by students from the University of Michigan in cooperation with the American Transportation Research Institute (ATRI), as of 2015 "54 billion gallons of fuel were consumed by trucks for business purposes—39 billion gallons of diesel fuel and 16 billion gallons of gasoline. Combination vehicles, which are powered nearly exclusively by diesel fuel, accounted for 75 percent of this diesel fuel consumption."

=== Technology ===
Like many other industries, the trucking industry has benefited from the use of computers and the Internet. The Internet helps firms explore new opportunities by aggressive sales and marketing. The incremental cost of conducting business transactions on the Internet is as little as one-fifteenth as expensive as paper transactions.

Given the limitations on truck weight and size, increased productivity in the industry comes from two sources: fewer empty miles and less time waiting between loads. U.S. Department of Transportation figures indicate that empty routes have continued to account for 29% of single-unit truck traffic; this has been equated to an annualized 15 billion gallons of gasoline, $30 billion cost, or 149 million tons of excess carbon emissions. Traditional freight brokers acted as intermediaries to manage the coordination of freight, helping independent drivers or companies match loads with available empty trucks. Increasingly, computerized brokers are threatening the future of traditional human brokers by offering increased efficiency. In addition, shipper-driven brokerage over the Internet enables shippers to post loads and solicit bids directly from carriers. Instead of relying upon traditional freight brokers, shippers function as their own brokers, dealing directly with freight companies.

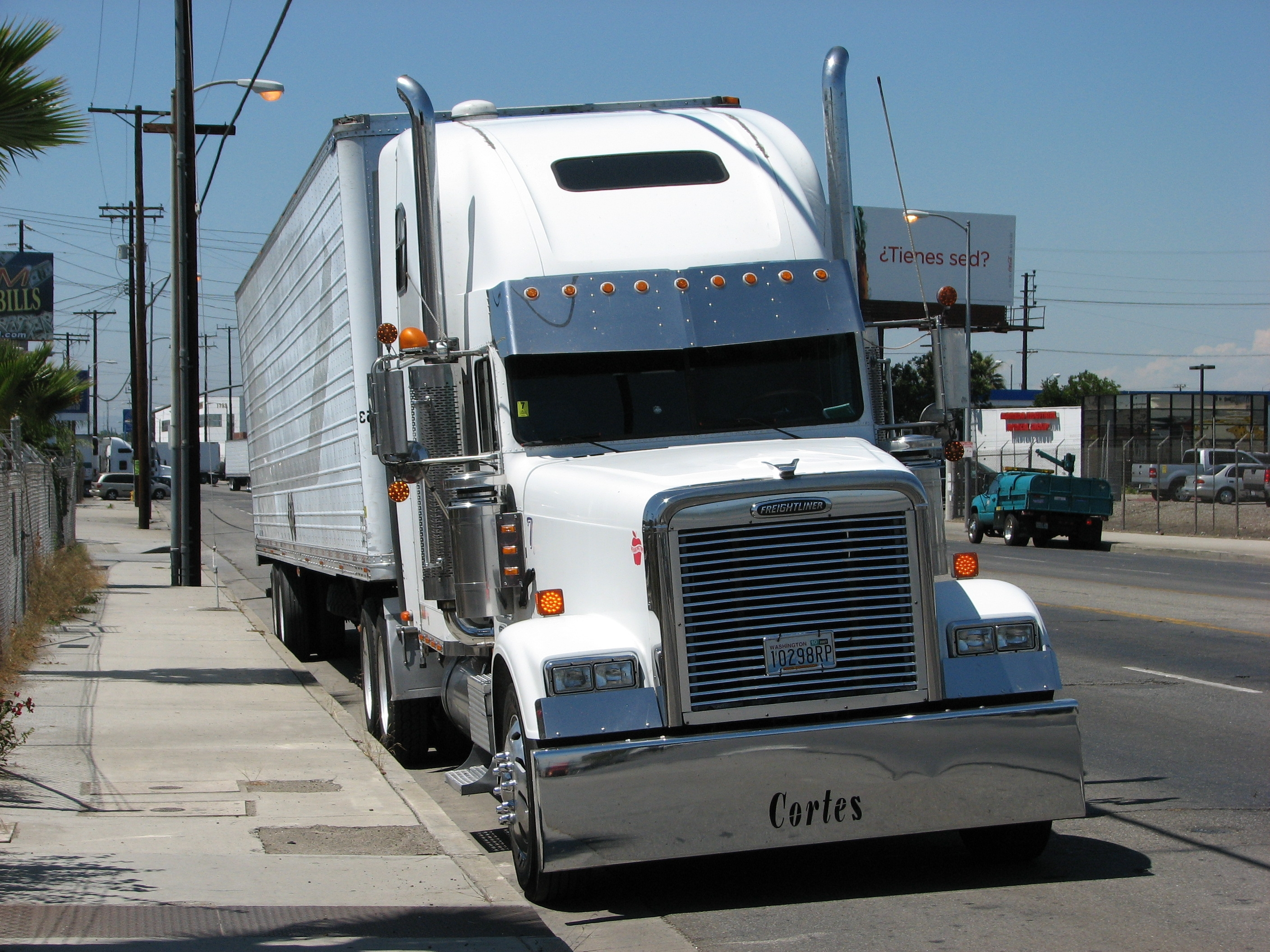
The satellite communications link (a white dome-shaped plastic shell) can be seen on top of the truck cab.

Developments in satellite technology have fostered increased communication and productivity within the trucking industry. Drivers may input the information from a bill of lading into a simple text-only dot matrix display screen (commonly called a "Qualcomm", for its ubiquitous OmniTRACS system). This allows the driver to communicate with their dispatcher, who is normally responsible for determining and informing the driver of their pick-up and drop-off locations. Drivers are no longer required to find the nearest public phone in order to relay information regarding their load status, it can be done without leaving the truck cab.

The driver inputs the information, using a keyboard, into an automated system of pre-formatted messages known as macros. There are macros for each stage of the loading and unloading process, such as "loaded and leaving shipper" and "arrived at final destination". This system also allows the company to track the driver's fuel usage, speed, gear optimization, engine idle time, location, direction of travel, and amount of time spent driving. According to trucking industry technologist, Phil Callaghan, in the United States every truck is like "a note on the system" and this digital transparency is driving a standards change globally

Trucks equipped with GPS satellite navigation units have enabled drivers to forgo a traditional paper-based map, saving time and effort. Drivers willing to pay for satellite radio or who work for a company that pays for it can listen to commercial-free music, sports, news, and talk radio coast-to-coast without interruption of signals between cities (as terrestrial radio signals are limited to a certain radius from the broadcasting tower). Digital satellite television allows smaller dish sizes, which means truck drivers are not limited to free terrestrial broadcast television and have more options about what they watch during their off-duty periods.

=== Automatic transmissions ===
Increasingly, companies have been equipping their trucks with automatic transmissions for a variety of reasons. Operating a manual transmission requires more skill and attention of the driver, partly due to the unsynchronized transmission found in heavy-duty trucks. Companies have found that automatic transmission has many benefits, including higher fuel efficiency, higher driver retention (drivers frustrated by a manual transmission may quit his/her job), lower wear of transmission gears (inexperienced drivers sometimes grind the gears if they do not follow proper shifting techniques), lower driver fatigue, and fewer accidents (manual transmissions require more attention from the driver, thus increasing the chances for an accident). All of these factors reduce costs for the company.

=== Top US trucking firms ===
According to the American Trucking Associations, 91.5% of carriers operate 10 or fewer trucks. The U.S. Census Bureau reported that 587,000 trucking businesses were single-person nonemployer operations, representing the majority of the industry's approximately 711,000 total businesses. Therefore, even the top corporate operators only hold a small share of the total market. According to the industry market research firm IBISWorld, J.B. Hunt Transport Services holds an estimated 2.5% market share, YRC Worldwide holds 1.8%, FedEx holds 1.6%, United Parcel Service of America owns 1.5%, and Con-way holds 1.4%.

Top 10 trucking companies by revenue in 2015:

Parent company	Primary service	Public/ Private	Revenue (millions) (2015)
UPS Freight	Parcel	Public	$29,829
FedEx Freight	Parcel	Public	$19,827
J.B. Hunt	FCL	Public	$6,188
YRC Worldwide	LTL	Public	$4,832
Swift Transportation	FCL & FTL	Public	$4,229
Hub Group	FCL	Public	$3,526
Schneider National	FCL & FTL	Public	$3,423
Landstar System	FTL	Public	$3,364
XPO, Inc.	FCL & LTL	Public	$3,273
Old Dominion Freight Line	LTL	Public	$2,788

== Economic impact ==
The importance of trucking in America is communicated by the industry adage: "If you bought it, a truck brought it." Retail stores, hospitals, gas stations, garbage disposal, construction sites, banks, and even a clean water supply depends entirely upon trucks to distribute vital cargo. Even before a product reaches store shelves, the raw materials and other stages of production materials that go into manufacturing any given product are moved by trucks.

Commercial Freight Activity in the US by Mode of Transportation
Transportation mode	Estimates in millions		Relative shares in percents
Transportation mode	Value	Tons	Value	Tons
Truck	$9,075,000	11,712	69.5	60.1
Rail	$392,000	1,979	3.0	10.2
Water	$673,000	1,668	5.2	8.6
Pipeline	$896,000	3,529	6.9	18.1
Other modes (incl. air, intermodal)	$2,015,000	600	15.4	3.0
Total	$13,052,000	19,847	100.0	100.0
Source: 2002 estimate by the Bureau of Transportation Statistics; Note: Weights listed are measured in short tons.

Today, railroads are primarily used to haul bulk quantities of cargo over long distances. Unless a manufacturing or distribution facility has a direct connection to the railroad, the remainder of the trip must be handled by truck. Recent implementation of "just in time" strategies have resulted in the increased use of trucks to help satisfy businesses' fluid inventory needs. Using this strategy, businesses gain the ability to reduce the costs associated with excess inventory and larger warehousing facilities by requiring more frequent deliveries. According to an industry group, many retail, commercial, and government services require daily or weekly deliveries to keep supplies or merchandise on hand. Many hospitals have also moved to "just in time" inventory systems. The nation's busiest gas stations require deliveries of fuel several times per day, while the average station receives fuel every two to three days. Grocery stores require deliveries of perishable food items every two to three days.

Trucks are vitally important to U.S. industry, however, measuring the impact of trucking on the economy is more difficult, because trucking services are so intertwined with all sectors of the economy. According to the measurable share of the economy that trucking represents, the industry directly contributes about 5 percent to the gross domestic product annually. In addition, the industry plays a critical support role for other transportation modes and for other sectors of the economy such as the resource, manufacturing, construction, and wholesale and retail trade industries.

Within the energy industry, approximately 4 percent of crude oil and petroleum products were shipped by truck in 2012. These shipments are handled by oil and gas logistics firms, which are midstream service providers that also handle transport by pipeline, rail, and barge. Dominant companies in this space include Aux Sable, Bridger Group, DCP Midstream, Enbridge Energy Partners, Enterprise Products Partners, Genesis Energy, Gibson Energy, Inergy Midstream, Kinder Morgan Energy Partners, Oneok Partners, Sunoco Logistics, Targa Midstream Services, TransCanada, and Williams Companies.

Agricultural products totaling $118,832,000, or 82.7 percent, were shipped by truck in 2007 (excluding animal feed, cereal grains, and forage products). About half of that agricultural freight was shipped by for-hire trucks and half by private trucks. More than 92 percent of prepared foods, including dairy products and prepared fruit, vegetable, and nut products, were moved by truck in 2007.

Within the health care industry, trucking moved $501,445,000 worth, or 65 percent of the total value, of pharmaceutical products in 2007.

Lumber and other wood products totaling $168,913,000 were shipped by truck in 2007, accounting for 91.9 percent of this class of product.

Over 80 percent of all communities in the US rely exclusively on trucks to deliver all of their fuel, clothing, medicine, and other consumer goods. The trucking industry employs 10 million people (out of a total national population of 300 million) in jobs that relate directly to trucking. The trucking industry is the industry of small business, considering 93 percent of interstate motor carriers (over 500,000) operate 20 or fewer trucks.

== Rules and regulations ==
A division of the U.S. Department of Transportation, the Federal Motor Carrier Safety Administration (FMCSA) regulates nearly all aspects of the trucking industry. In 2018, 885 large truck occupants died, while 4,678 people died in collisions with large trucks. Truck drivers are limited by the number of daily and weekly hours they may drive, the roads and highways they may drive upon, and a lower legal definition of drunkenness. The Federal Highway Administration has established 0.04 percent as the blood alcohol concentration (BAC) level at or above which a CMV driver is deemed to be driving under the influence of alcohol. States maintain a BAC level between 0.08 and 0.10 percent for non-CMV drivers. In some states, trucks also have special speed limits, in addition to restrictions on driving in certain lanes (normally the far right lanes of multi-lane highways).

=== Commercial driver's license ===
Trucks come in many different sizes, creating the need for a truck classification system. Truck drivers are required to have a commercial driver's license (CDL) to operate a CMV carrying more than 16 passengers, carrying a certain amount of hazardous materials, or weighing in excess of 26,000 pounds (12,000 kg). Acquiring a CDL requires a skills test (driving test), and knowledge test (written test) covering the unique handling qualities of driving a large, heavily loaded 18-wheeler (e.g., backing maneuvers), and the mechanical systems required to operate such a vehicle (e.g., air brakes and vehicle inspection procedures). It costs thousands of dollars to attend a CDL school. One ATA survey found that 86% of truckload carriers had a formal relationship with a noncarrier CDL school; 88% of those had a relationship with a private, for-profit CDL school. Critics cite these relationships as evidence that CDL schools are driver mills for trucking companies.

=== Hours of service ===
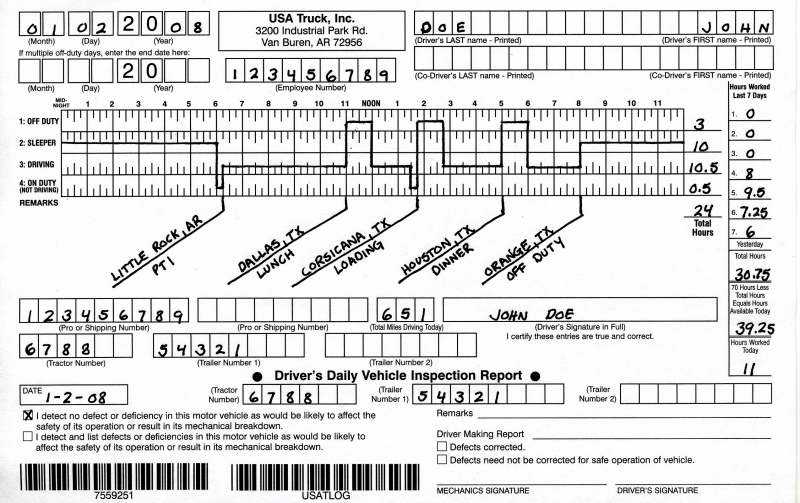
Drivers are required to keep track of driving hours in a log book, using a time grid for each day along with information identifying the vehicle, driver, and company.

The FMCSA defines a CMV as a single or combination (truck and trailer) vehicle with a gross weight of 10,001 pounds (4,536 kg) or more, or a vehicle used to transport hazardous materials in quantities requiring the vehicle to be marked or placarded under the hazardous materials regulations. The length of time a driver may spend operating a CMV is limited by a set of rules known as the hours of service (HOS). These laws are designed to protect the general motoring public by reducing accidents caused by driver fatigue.

The first version of the HOS was enacted in 1938, and four revisions have been made since. The more recent revisions have relied on research into the human circadian rhythm (the tendency for humans to follow a natural 24-hour cycle with 8 hours of uninterrupted sleep). As of July 1, 2013, a driver operating under federal property carrying regulations is limited to 11 hours of actual driving within a 14-hour period, and requires a 30-minute break during the first 8 hours of on duty time. After which drivers must rest for 10 hours. The rules do not explicitly require that a driver must sleep, only that a driver must take a period of "rest" within the sleeper berth or off duty (i.e., at home). Distinct regulations exist for passenger carrying drivers as well as vehicles designed specifically for oilfield operations as well as construction related activities. Some US States also allow for special intrastate regulations to be followed if the vehicle is operating entirely within the bounds of the given state.

Keeping track of a driver's HOS requires the use of a log book. A truck driver's log book is a legally defined form containing a grid outlining the 24-hour day into 15-minute increments. Drivers must specify where and when stops occur between driving shifts, what duties were performed (if any), along with the driver's name, truck number, company info, and other information. The driver must also present his or her log book to authorities upon request, for inspection. In lieu of a log book, a motor carrier may substitute an electronic on-board recorder to record the driver's hours.

On December 16, 2019, a new (Electronic Logging Device) Mandate will come into full force. This new mandate requires that drivers utilize specifically designed electronic logging equipment which records driving time based upon a direct communication link with a vehicles engine. Once a vehicle reaches a speed of 5 mph it is considered to be "driving" and a vehicle must remain at a speed of zero mph in order for a driving event to be ended automatically.

=== Weight, size, and route restrictions ===
The FMCSA regulates the length, width, and weight limits of CMVs for interstate commercial traffic. Interstate commercial traffic is generally limited to a network of interstate freeways, U.S. highways and state highways known as the National Network (NN). Provided the truck remains on the NN, they are not subject to the state limits. State limits (which can be lower or higher than federal limits) come into effect for intrastate commercial traffic, provided the vehicle is not on the NN.

There is no federal height limit, and states may set their own limits which range from 13 feet 6 inches (4.11 m) (mostly on the east coast) to 14 feet (4.3 m) (west coast)., As a result, the majority of trucks are somewhere between 13 feet 6 inches (4.11 m) and 14 feet (4.3 m) high. Truck drivers are responsible for checking bridge height clearances (usually indicated by a warning sign) before passing underneath an overpass or entering a tunnel. Not having enough vertical clearance can result in a "top out" or "bridge hit," causing considerable traffic delays and costly repairs for the bridge or tunnel involved.

The federal gross weight limit for a Class 8 truck is 80,000 pounds (36,000 kg) (combined weight of truck, trailer, and cargo) with axle weights limited to 12,000 pounds (5,400 kg) (steering axle) and 34,000 pounds (15,000 kg) (tandem axles). Truck drivers are responsible for checking their own vehicle's weight, usually by paying to be weighed at a truck stop scale. CMVs are subject to various state and federal laws regarding limitations on truck length (measured from bumper to bumper), and truck axle length (measured from axle to axle, or fifth wheel kingpin to axle for trailers). The relationship between axle weight and spacing, known as the Federal Bridge Gross Weight Formula, is designed to protect bridges. Truck weights and sizes are checked by state authorities at a weigh station or port-of-entry.

== Types of vehicles used in trucking ==
=== Tractor ===
The cab and drive axle portion of a large capacity truck and trailer. Since the primary purpose of the cab is to pull the trailer, it is rightly referred to as a tractor. The various kinds of tractors are yard, day, and sleepers.

When a tractor is operated without a trailer attached, it can be referred to as a bobtail.

=== Flatbed ===
The flatbed is essentially a trailer without the enclosed portion on the back. The back or bed is flat and open. These are often referred to as stake beds.

=== Dry van ===
An enclosed trailer 53 feet (16 m) long, although they can be shorter.

=== Reefer ===
A refrigerated container is an insulated enclosed trailer typically 53 feet (16 m) in length. They have a stand-alone engine (usually ThermoKing or Carrier) unit mounted at the front or underside of the trailer to cool the cargo. They also have their own fuel tank as to not rely on a tractor for power. They can keep frozen down to −20 °F (−29 °C)

=== Panel van ===
The panel van comes in various sizes. As small as a mini-van and up to having a fairly large box on the bed of a truck. These are seen as box trucks.

=== Hotshot ===
Hotshot trucking is a more downsized version of semi trucking. In semi-trucking, most companies are larger sized companies with multiple trucks, trailers, drivers, etc., whereas, Hotshot trucking is typically single person companies run and operated by the driver themselves. Most hotshots are run using larger 1 ton and heavier Pickup trucks (ex, Ram 3500, Ford F-350, Chevrolet Silverado 3500). These are typically paired with larger fifth wheel trailers or gooseneck trailers such as made by Big-Tex, PJ Trailers, Gatormade and Diamond-C. Most Hotshots run mixed freight and or vehicles, as do semi trucks. One big upside to Hotshot trucking is a Commercial Drivers License (CDL) is not required by law, so long as the Gross Vehicle Weight (GVW) does not exceed 26,000 total pounds (13 tons).

== Truck drivers ==
=== Definition ===
Truck drivers are persons employed as the operator of a CMV. CMVs can be of varying shapes and sizes, from 10,000-pound (4,500 kg) pickup trucks assigned to haul specialized or small quantities of freight, all the way up to 105,500-pound (47,900 kg) semi-trailer trucks. Trucks are assigned a class rating based upon the gross vehicle weight rating (GVWR). The facts in this section refer to drivers of "heavy duty" trucks (with a GVWR of at least 26,000 pounds (12,000 kg), which require a commercial driver's license to operate).

=== Working environment ===
Truck drivers spend up to 11 hours per day driving, and up to 14 hours per day in driving, fueling, paperwork, vehicle inspections and repairs. Long-haul drivers often spend weeks away from home, spending their time off and sleeping at truck stops or rest areas. Driving is relatively dangerous work, as truck drivers account for 12% and the highest total number of all work-related deaths, and are five times more likely to die on the job than the average worker. Drivers lead generally risk-prone lifestyles due to smoking, lack of exercise, unhealthy eating and work-related injuries. A survey by the National Institutes of Health found 67% of long-haul drivers were smokers or former smokers. A global meta-analysis found that a large proportion of long-haul truckers take amphetamines to get through long shifts. Results varied by country, but in one study 30% of long-haul truckers admitted to amphetamine use while driving. A study that employed drug-testing found that 8% of the drivers tested positive for amphetamine use.

=== Turnover ===
In 2006, the U.S. trucking industry employed 1.8 million drivers of heavy trucks. A major problem for the long-haul trucking industry is that a large percentage of these drivers are aging, and are expected to retire. Very few new hires are expected in the near future, resulting in a driver shortage. As of 2005, within the long-haul sector, there is an estimated shortage of 20,000 drivers. That shortage was projected to increase to 111,000 by 2014, however the actual shortage of truck drivers in 2014 was around 38,000. The trucking industry (especially the long-haul sector) is also facing an image crisis due to the long working hours, long periods of time away from home, the dangerous nature of the work, and lower earnings than other labor (for example, 1% lower than construction in 2004).

Employee turnover in long-haul trucking is notorious for being high. In the 4th quarter of 2005, turnover for the largest carriers in the industry reached a record 136%, which means that for every 100 new employees hired, 136 quit their jobs. This results in a "revolving door" within most long-haul trucking companies, as drivers are constantly switching jobs or leaving the industry. In the short-haul and less-than-truckload (LTL) sectors, driver turnover is only around 15%, mainly due to the better working conditions, higher pay, and unionized workers. One study suggests that larger companies with irregular routes, longer average haul, and older equipment experience much higher rates of driver turnover. Some believe that the turnover benefits trucking companies by causing wages to be mostly entry-level.

=== Serial killings ===
In 2009, the Federal Bureau of Investigation (FBI) released the results of a five-year-long study (the Highway Serial Killings Initiative) investigating the unsolved murders of prostitutes, hitchhikers, and stranded motorists. Over 500 female victims have been compiled in a database, most of whom were killed or discarded at truck stops, hotels, and roadsides. The FBI has speculated that many of these victims were murdered by long-haul truck drivers, some of whom may be serial killers. Investigators speculate that the easy access to potential victims, mobility, and lack of supervision enjoyed by long-haul truck drivers have contributed to this phenomenon. The head of the initiative, Michael Harrigan, says most of the victims lead high-risk lifestyles (e.g., prostitution) which left them particularly vulnerable. In 2004, the FBI began investigating a string of murders in which the victims were found along the Interstate 40 corridor in Oklahoma and several other states, which sparked the creation of the Highway Serial Killings Initiative.

In response to the investigation, the executive vice president of the Owner-Operator Independent Drivers Association, Todd Spencer, said "Truckers are just absolutely outraged that various media sources or the FBI would draw the conclusion that truckers are over-represented in the ranks of serial killers".

== Trade groups ==
- Women In Trucking Association, Inc
- Owner-Operator Independent Drivers Association
- NorthAmerican Transportation Association

== Trucking organizations ==
- Teamsters Union
- National Motor Freight Traffic Association
- American Trucking Associations

== See also ==
- Glossary of trucking industry terms
- List of electric truck makers
- Truck manufacturers in the United States
- Long combination vehicle
- Oversize load
- Self-driving truck
- Semi trailer
- Semi-trailer truck
