= Glossary of the American trucking industry =

Index of General
- 1. Bill of lading 2. Broker; 3. Bulk cargo 4. Bulk freight 5. Cargo; 6. Consignee; 7. Consignment; 8. Consignor; 9. Deadheading; 10. Electronic on-board recorder 11. Float shifting 12. Freight; 13. Hazardous materials 14. Intermodal; 15. Just in time 16. Log book 17. Manifest; 18. Operating authority 19. Oversize load 20. Pallet; 21. Receiver; 22. Shipper; 23. Terminal; 24. Tractor; 25. Truck stop electrification

Index of Drivers and carriers
- 1. Common carrier 2. Company driver 3. Contract carrier 4. Dedicated route 5. For-hire carrier 6. Irregular route 7. Less-than-truckload; 8. Long-haul; 9. Motor carrier 10. Over-the-road; 11. Owner-operator; 12. Private carrier 13. Regional route 14. Regular route 15. Team drivers

Index of Vehicles
- 1. Big rig 2. Big truck 3. Bobtail; 4. Bob truck 5. Box truck 6. Cab over 7. Combination vehicle 8. Conventional truck 9. Day cab 10. Dump truck 11. Eighteen-wheeler; 12. Semi-truck; 13. Straight truck 14. Tractor-trailer

Index of Vehicle parts
- 1. Baffle; 2. Bulkhead; 3. Bunk; 4. Cab; 5. Cabin; 6. Cheater axle 7. Engine brake 8. Fifth wheel 9. Glad hands 10. Headache rack 11. Jake brake 12. Kingpin; 13. Landing gear 14. Lift axle 15. Retarder; 16. Sleeper berth 17. Super single 18. Tandem; 19. Tandem axle 20. Tandem wheel

Index of Trailers
- 1. Auto transport 2. Belly dump 3. Bottom dump 4. Bull wagon 5. Car hauler 6. Container; 7. Container skeletal carrier 8. Covered wagon 9. Curtainside; 10. Deep-drop van 11. Double decker 12. Dropdeck; 13. Dry bulk 14. Dry van 15. Dump; 16. Flatbed; 17. Gooseneck lowboy 18. Grain; 19. Hopper; 20. Livestock; 21. Logger; 22. Lowboy; 23. Platform; 24. Portable parking lot 25. Pup; 26. Rear dump 27. Reefer; 28. Refrigerated van 29. Side kit 30. Sideloader; 31. Skateboard; 32. Stepdeck; 33. Tank; 34. Tanker; 35. Timber

Index of Trailer configurations
- 1. Rocky Mountain Double; 2. Standard; 3. Triple; 4. Turnpike Double

A specialized set of jargon used within — or to describe the tools, equipment, types of employment, people and organizations involved in — the trucking industry in the United States.

The list below is not necessarily confined to the US: some of its component terms are used within, and indeed many originated from, trucking industries in other, mostly English-speaking, countries.

Some terms, either with similar or with different meanings, are used also in other parts of the broader freight or logistics industry, of which trucking is only a part (freight is generally thought to include at least transport of goods by air, rail, and ship, as well as some specialized manufacturing industries). For example, shore power is used to describe truck stop electricifcation, but it was initially a term borrowed from the shipping industry (it refers, in shipping, to electrical power transferred from land lines on shore to ships while in port, removing the need for ships to idle their own, inefficient and locally polluting engines so as to generate electricity). Another example of such borrowing, in this case from the aviation industry, is the term landing gear (referring, in the trucking context, not to the wheel assembly of a plane but to the legs which support the front end of a semi-trailer when it is not connected to a semi-truck).

Some terms used in the industry are obvious wordplay, such as portable parking lot (referring to a truck that carries automobiles).

This glossary is organized into several subject-matter categories (general terms, drivers and carriers, vehicles, vehicle parts, trailers, and trailer configurations) and then, within each of these categories, alphabetically by American English spelling.

== General terms ==
Bill of lading (BOL, BL, B/L)
A paper document between a shipper and a carrier acknowledging the receipt of goods for transport. Usually describes the nature of the cargo; hazardous materials classification (if any); amount of cargo by weight, size, and/or number of pallets, boxes, barrels, etc; and the origin and destination of the cargo.

Bobtailing
Operating a tractor unit with no trailer attached.

Broker
A person or company that arranges for the truck transportation of cargo belonging to others, using for-hire carriers to provide the actual truck transportation.

Bulk cargo
Large quantities of undivided or unpackaged cargo, such as grain or dry powder.

Bulk freight
See bulk cargo.

Cargo
See freight.

CB
See CB radio - Citizen's Band Radio.
CB radio equipment is found in the vast majority of 18-wheelers and is used by truckers for various purposes, including talking to other truckers on the highway, discussing road and weather conditions, coordinating activity at distribution centers and truckstops and various other purposes, including emergency communications. In the United States, many truckers monitor CB channel 19 (27.185 MHz), commonly known as the "highway channel" or "trucker's channel".

Consignee
The person or entity transferring legal responsibility or ownership of the cargo (or consignment) from the carrier.

Consignment
An agreement between a consignee and a consignor in which the goods are taken responsibility for and transported by a third party, the carrier. May also simply refer to the consigned goods (i.e., the cargo).

Consignor
The person or entity transferring legal responsibility or ownership of the cargo (or consignment) to the carrier.

Deadheading
Operating a truck empty.

Electronic on-board recorder (EOBR)
A device hooked into the truck which transmits useful management information such as truck location, speed, and idle time.

Float shifting
Shifting gears without using the clutch pedal. Also called "slip shifting" or "dead sticking".

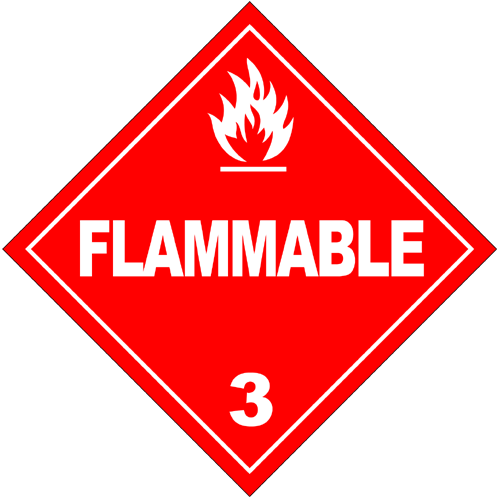
A hazardous materials placard

Freight
The materials or goods being transported.

Hazardous materials (Haz-mat)
Explosive, flammable, poisonous or otherwise potentially dangerous cargo. Large amounts or especially hazardous cargo are required to be placarded under haz-mat regulations.

Intermodal
A single trailer or container that encounters multiple forms of transportation along its route, such as truck/ship/rail.

Just-in-time
A method of inventory control in which warehousing is either nonexistent or kept to a minimum. The freight arrives "just in time", and only when it is needed.

Log book
A form which describes the working duties of truck drivers for each 24-hour period.

Load Board
An online or physical marketplace where freight brokers and shippers post loads to be hauled, and truck drivers or carriers search for available freight. Load boards help match carriers with available cargo, often showing details such as origin, destination, weight, and payment terms.

Manifest
A document that describes the contents of a shipment in greater detail than a bill of lading. Commonly used as a checklist during unloading.

Operating authority
Motor carriers for-hire must apply for the authority to engage in interstate commerce with the Federal Motor Carrier Safety Administration.

Oversize load
A unit of cargo that is larger than the legally defined limits for width, length, height, and/or weight; it cannot be broken down into smaller units.

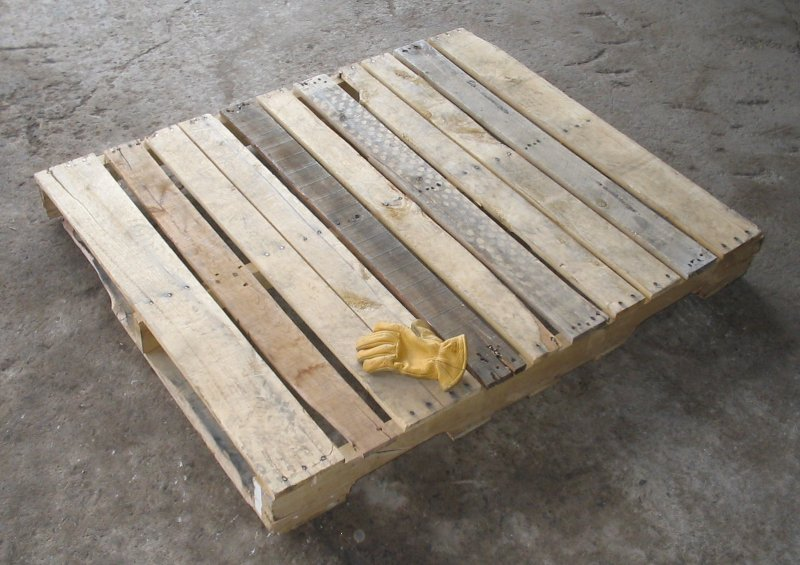
A typical wooden pallet

Pallet
A wooden (or sometimes plastic) platform on which boxes or cargo are stacked and sometimes shrink-wrapped. Usually refers to the entire palletized stack of boxes, although it can refer to the platform itself.

Receiver
Consignee, importer, or buyer (who may or may not be the same) named in the bill of lading as the party responsible for receiving a shipment.

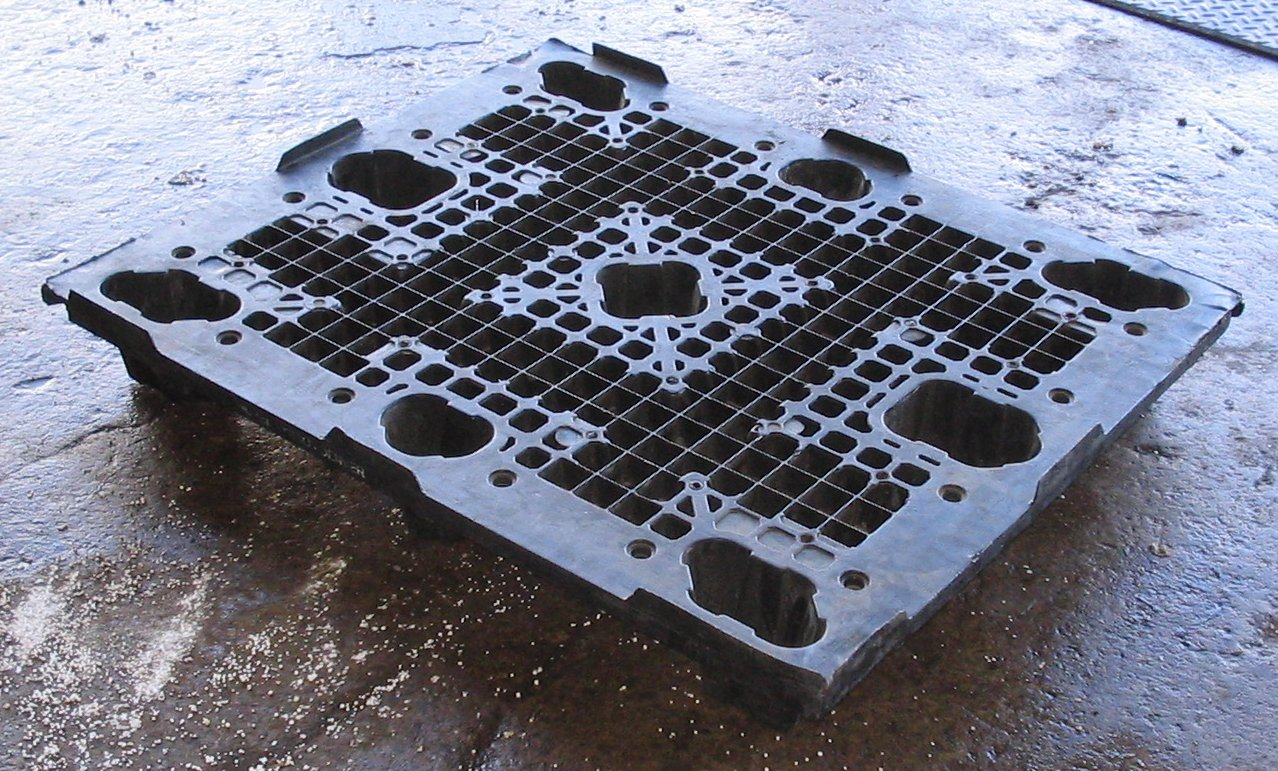
A plastic pallet

Shipper
A consignor, exporter, or seller (who may or may not be the same) named in the bill of lading as the party responsible for initiating a shipment.

Terminal
A dock or hub where freight originates, terminates, or is handled in the transportation process; or a location where motor carriers maintain operating facilities.

Tractor
A semi-truck (powered unit) used to pull a load or semi-trailer (unpowered unit) by means of a fifth wheel mounted over the rear axle(s) in a semi-truck/semi-trailer combination.

Truck stop electrification (TSE)
The capability to connect a truck to a land-based electric power supply ("shore power") at a truck stop. Eliminates the need for engine idling while parked, and in the case of IdleAire, also supplies land-based climate control within the truck cab, as well as Internet and TV access.

Weigh station
A chosen point off the highway, where the state highway patrol examines the weight of a vehicle that weigh over 10,000 pounds.

== Drivers and carriers ==
Common carrier
A for-hire carrier that is obligated to serve the general public.

Company driver
Employee of a carrier who is assigned to drive company-owned trucks.

Contract carrier
A for-hire carrier contracted to one particular shipper. A contract carrier enters into a contract whose terms are negotiated between a specific carrier and specific customer.

Dedicated route
A driver or carrier who transports cargo between regular, prescribed routes. Regular route drivers usually are at home on regular intervals, given the scheduled nature of their routes.

For-hire carrier
A licensed carrier that holds itself out to hire under either a public tariff for the general public (for-hire common carrier) or under a contract filed with a specific shipper (contract carrier). For-hire carriers must apply for operating authority with the Federal Motor Carrier Safety Administration.

Irregular route
See over-the-road.

Less-than-truckload (LTL)
A driver or carrier who specializes in, or a load composed of many different types of cargo, each typically weighing less than 10,000 pounds (4,500 kg), with many different destinations. Generally involves the use of terminal facilities to break and consolidate shipments. A LTL driver normally has a dedicated or regional route.

Long-haul
See over-the-road.

Motor carrier
A person or company providing transportation of property or passengers using commercial motor vehicles.

Over-the-road (OTR)
A driver or carrier who transports cargo to any place at any time, without prescribed schedules or routes. Long-Haul OTR involves being away for weeks, or months at a time, often cross-country or international (Canada and Mexico), given the unscheduled nature of their routes.

Owner-operator (O/O)
Self-employed independent drivers who operate privately owned or leased trucks, as opposed to a company driver.

Private carrier
A not-for-hire carrier contracted to or owned by a shipper that does not offer services to the general public, and operates primarily to transport its own goods. Private carriers are not required to obtain operating authority by the Federal Motor Carrier Safety Administration (FMCSA).

Regional route
A driver or carrier who transports cargo in a limited geographical area, usually within a certain radius of one's own home or company terminal, and may or may not maintain a schedule.

Regular route
See dedicated route.

Team drivers
A team of two or more drivers who ride together and drive the same truck in shifts, essentially allowing the truck to remain in motion almost constantly. Primarily used for time-sensitive freight.

== Vehicles ==
Big rig
See semi-truck.

Big truck
See semi-truck.

Bobtail
A tractor without a trailer. In verb form, this also refers to operating a truck without a trailer.

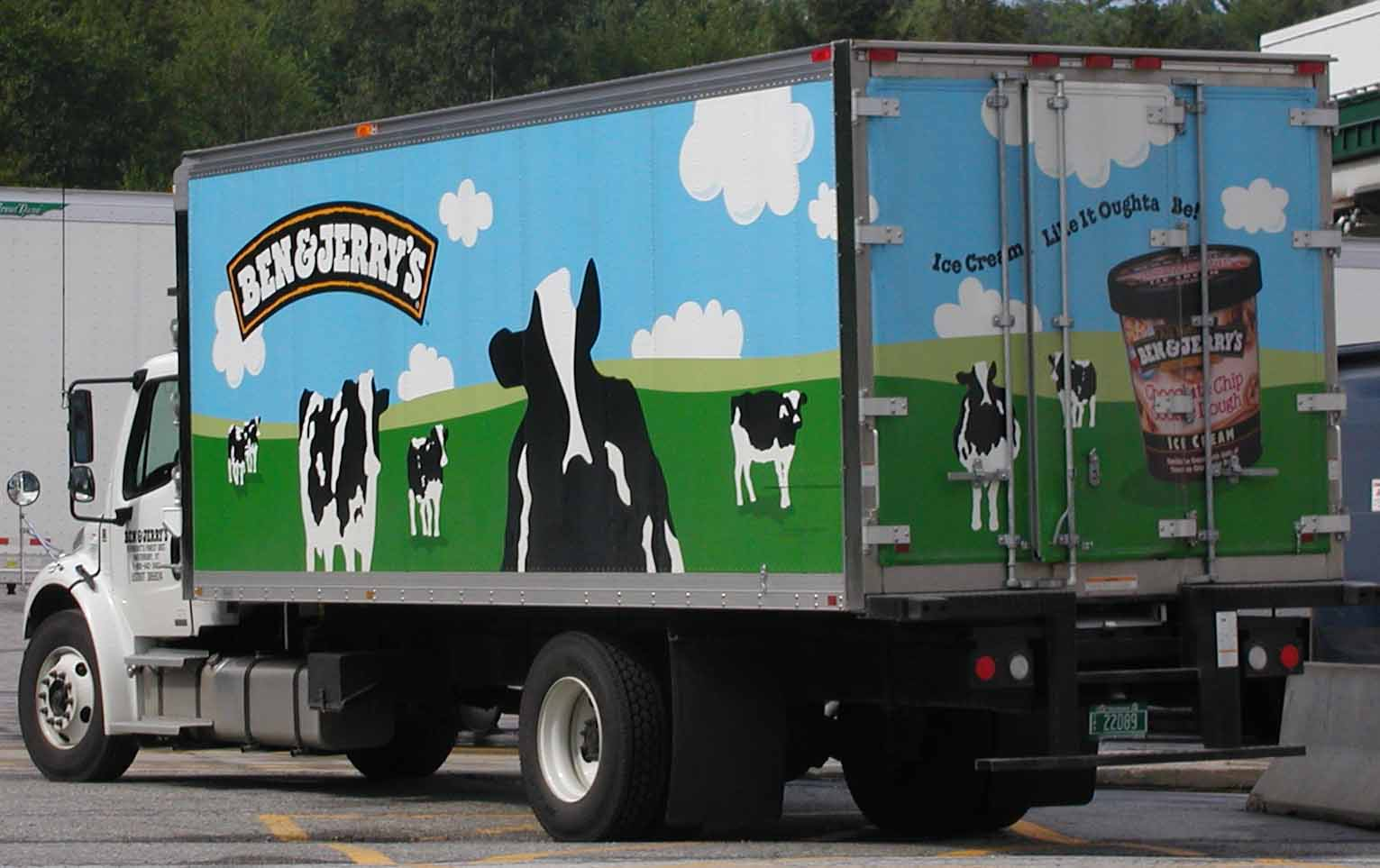
A straight truck or box truck

Cab over
A short, box-shaped tractor with no hood (UK: bonnet), and a steep vertical front. The "cab" rides "over" the engine and front steering axle. Used when a shorter wheelbase is needed.

Combination vehicle
A vehicle composed of two or more separate units, a tractor (powered unit, semi-truck) and a trailer (unpowered unit, semi-trailer).

Conventional truck
A truck or tractor featuring an engine forward of the cab, with a conventional hood configuration.

Day cab
A truck cab without a sleeper berth.

Dump truck
A truck with a bucket-like cargo area which the front can be raised, hinging on the rear, allowing the load to slide ("dump") out of the cargo area. Often a straight truck, semi-trailers are also common. Flatbeds and refuse container trucks can often "dump", but are rarely called that.

Eighteen-wheeler
This term is derived from the number of tires that the typical OTR tractor-trailer configuration has. See also semi-truck.

Semi-truck
An articulated (jointed) combination vehicle, often composed of a 10-wheeled (three axle) tractor and a 4-wheeled (two axle) trailer. There are also two axle tractors, single axle trailers, and occasionally combinations with extra lift axles. In some applications a semi can pull additional full trailers (doubles and triples) with the use of a single axle or tandem axle converter dolly. The use of the term "semi" in the name comes from the semi-trailer, a vehicle whose load is carried partly by its own axles and partly by the pulling vehicle, which is commonly included in tractor-trailer rigs.

Straight truck
A single vehicle, with no articulation. Normally 2 or 3 axles, sometimes with lift axles.

Tractor-trailer
See semi-truck.

Truck crane
A special truck (carrier) with a permanently mounted crane (upper). This design allows faster moves from site to site than conventional cranes.

== Vehicle parts ==
See also Semi-trailer truck#Construction for a diagram of truck parts.

Baffle
A partition or separator within a liquid tank, used to inhibit the flow of fluids within the tank. During acceleration, turning, and braking, a large liquid-filled tank may produce unexpected forces on the vehicle due to the inertia of liquids.

Bulkhead
A strong wall-like structure placed at the front of a flatbed trailer used to protect the driver against shifting cargo during a front-end collision. May also refer to any separator within a dry or liquid trailer (also called a baffle for liquid trailers) used to partition the load. See also: headache rack.

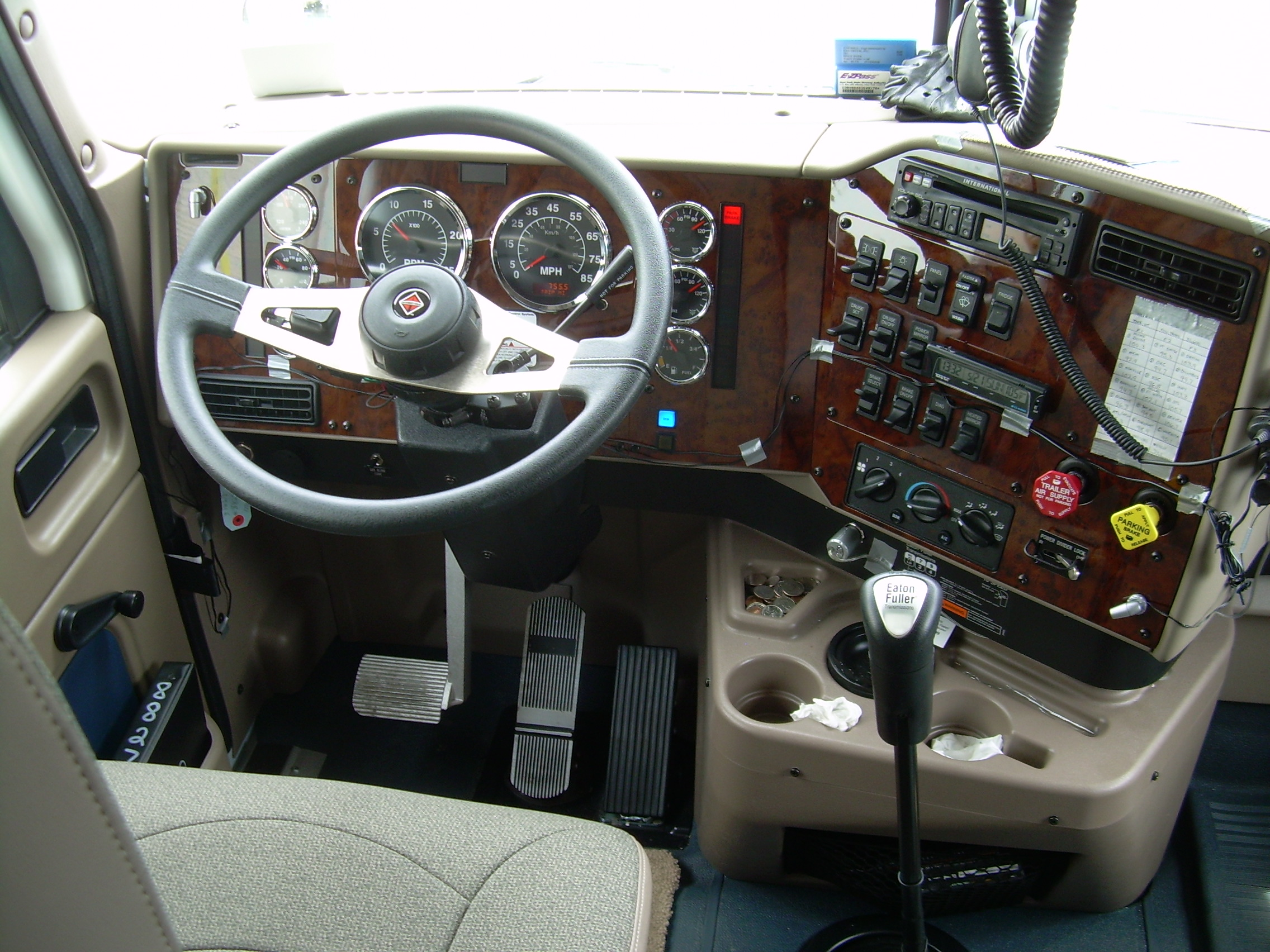
The cab of an 18-wheeler

Bunk
See sleeper berth.

Cab
The interior of a truck where the driver sits to operate the vehicle.

Cheater axle
See lift axle.

Dual wheels
A pair of tire and wheel assemblies mounted side-by-side on a single axle hub. In some applications it is replaced by a super single. On pickup trucks it is sometimes called a dually. The assembly has a greater load carrying ability as compared to a single wheel. It also provides redundancy so if one of the two tires fail the second will maintain support preventing loss of vehicle control and allowing the vehicle to travel to a repair facility.

Engine brake
A braking system that utilizes the back pressure from the engine's pistons to slow down the vehicle. Commonly used to prevent heavy trucks from accelerating out of control while driving on steep downhill grades.

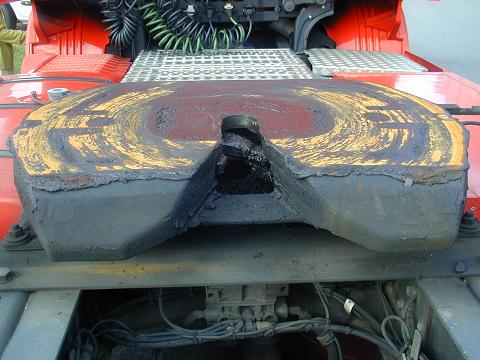
A fifth wheel coupling platform

Fifth wheel
A pivoting platform on the rear of a truck tractor, used to support the front end of the trailer being towed that contains locking jaws that engage the trailer kingpin.

Float
A popular name for a wide tire used on the steer (front) axle (originally known as a Super Single). Floats distribute the weight on the front axle over a wider area, preventing the tire sinking into softer ground. Commonly used on dump trucks, cement mixers, etc.

Glad hands
Interlocking connectors attached to air hoses that supply air from the tractor to the trailer for air brakes.

Headache rack
A sturdy aluminum wall or steel mesh structure affixed to the tractor between the cab and the fifth wheel to protect the tractor occupants from the load on the trailer. See also: #Bulkhead

Jake brake
A popular brand of engine brake. See also engine brake.

Kingpin
A large pin, underneath the front of a trailer, which interlocks with the fifth wheel.

Landing gear
A set of retractable, crank-up legs that support the front of a trailer when it is not connected to a tractor.

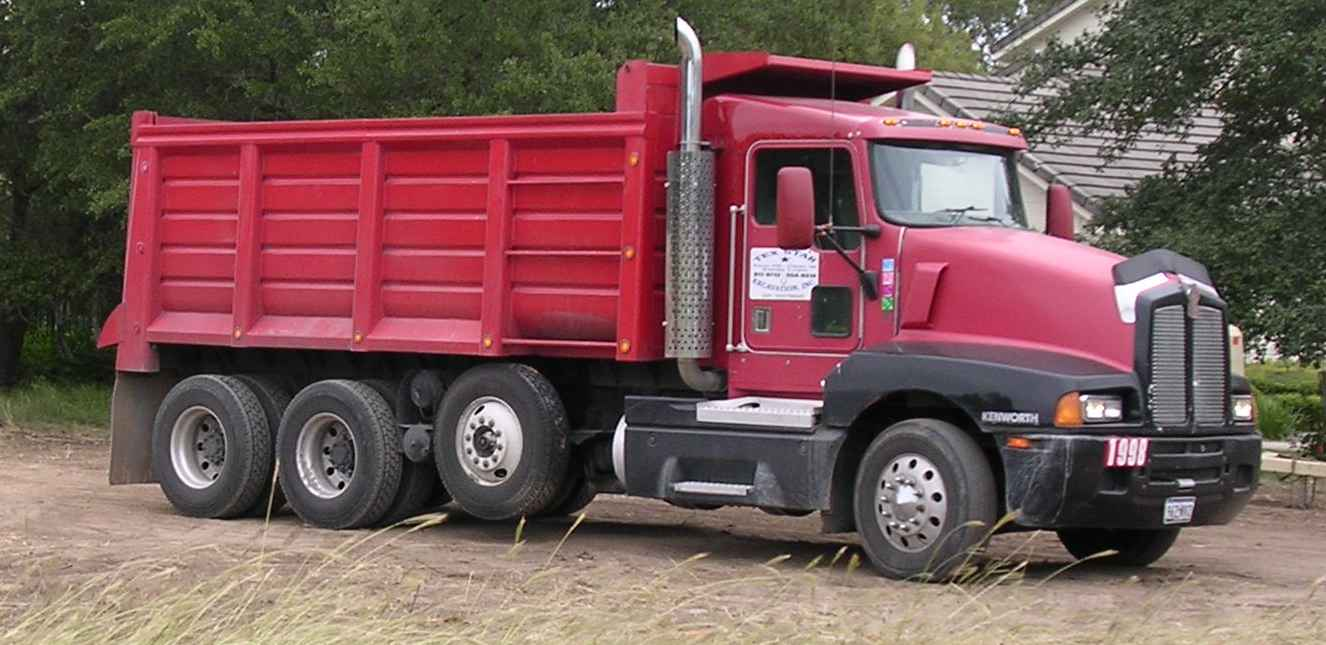
A dump truck with a raised lift axle

Lift axle
An air-powered axle that may be raised or lowered to the ground to provide greater load-carrying capacity, or to comply with axle weight requirements (see also Federal Gross Weight Bridge Formula).

Retarder
A device used to assist braking that does not use friction. such as engine braking or axle-mounted electromagnetic retarders. See also engine brake.

Sleeper berth
The portion of the truck's interior designated for sleeping, legally must contain a bed.

Super single
A popular name for a single, larger wheel and tire, (properly called a "wide-base tire"), substituted for dual wheels, an adjacent pair assembly. The main benefit of a super single is a reduction in weight; combined with lower rolling resistance the super single promises better fuel economy. It also prevents rocks from being stuck in between, damaging tires or other vehicles (fling out). The disadvantage is the lack of tire redundancy from which dual wheels benefit, as tire failure can disable the vehicle and increased highway wear, through the high point loading and scrubbing of road surfaces when making tight turns.

Tandem axle
A set of axles spaced close together, legally defined as more than 40 and less than 96 inches apart by the USDOT.

== Trailers ==
Auto transport
A specialized trailer or truck/trailer combination used for transporting passenger vehicles.

Belly dump
See bottom dump.

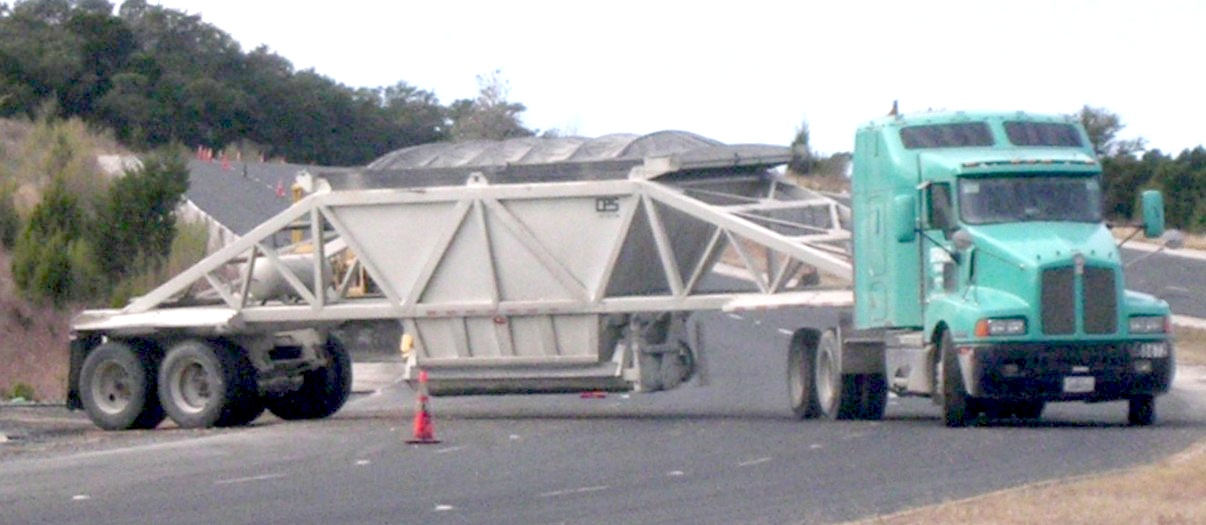
A bottom dump trailer

Beverage trailer
A trailer between 26 feet (7.9 m) and 29 feet (8.8 m) used primarily for the transport of beverages. Colloquially known as a sidebanger, sideloader, or route trailer.

Bottom dump
A dump with a funnel-shaped floor for unloading through the bottom.

Bull wagon
See livestock.

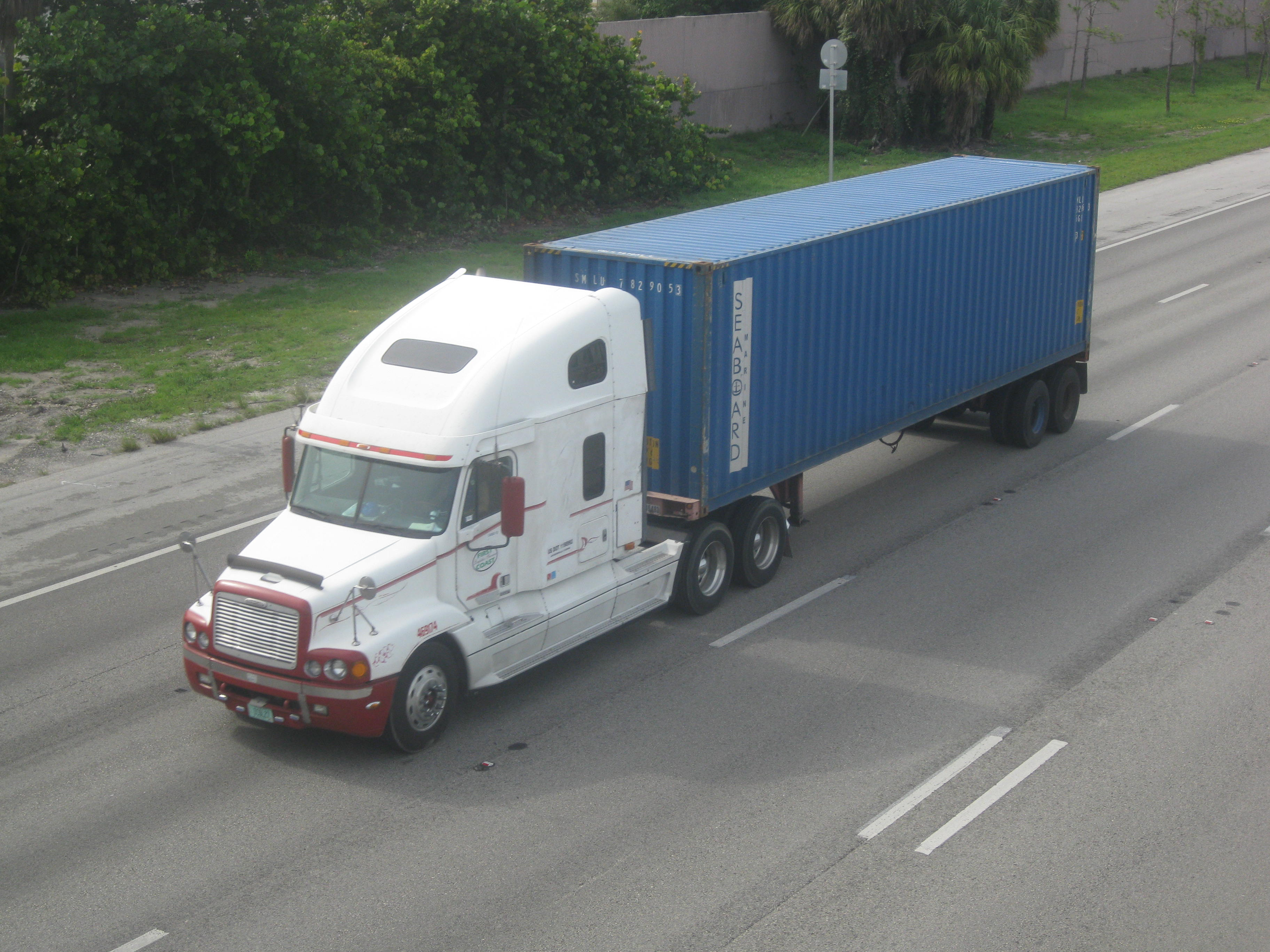
An intermodal container trailer

Car hauler
See auto transport.

Chip van
specially designed bulk dry van with open top for wood byproducts.

Container
A simple, enclosed box of standardized sizes, used for intermodal transport.

Container skeletal carrier
A skeletal trailer composed of a simple chassis for the mounting of an intermodal container.

Covered wagon
A flatbed with specially fitted side plates and curved ribs supporting a tarp covering, commonly referred to as a "side kit". Named for the resemblance to horse-drawn covered wagons.

Curtainside
Can be either a dry box with tarp sides, or a flatbed with a movable frame of squared ribs supporting a tarp.

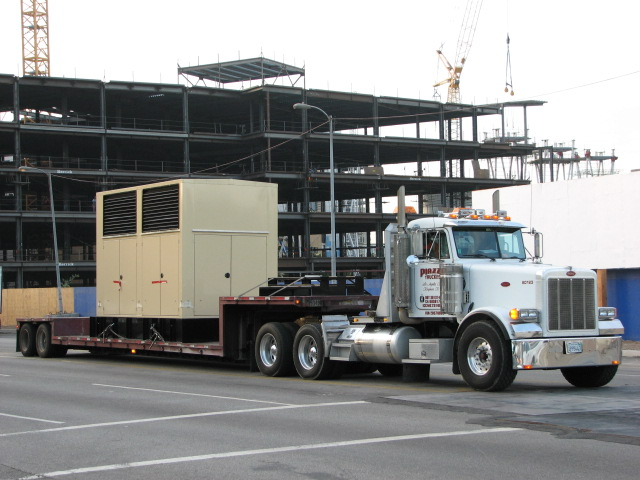
A double dropdeck flatbed trailer

Deep-drop van
A specialized dry van that maximizes interior space, with a lowered floor and higher roof. Normally used to transport bulky, relatively light cargo, such as furniture and electronics.

Double decker
A specialized trailer with 2 floors to allow for more cargo space.

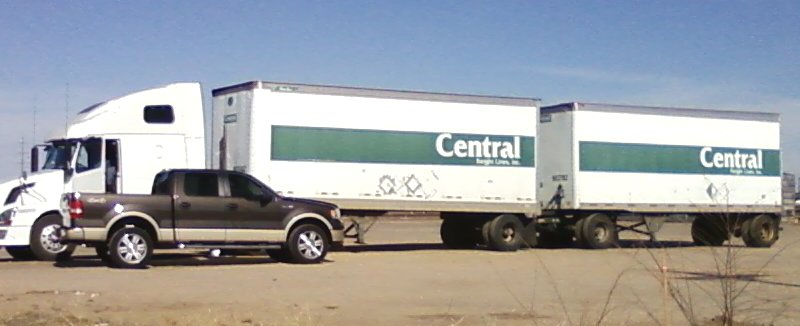
Twin pup trailers

Doubles trailer
A trailer between 26 feet (7.9 m) and 29 feet (8.8 m) long that can be used singularly as a delivery trailer in congested areas or in combination with another trailer for over the road.

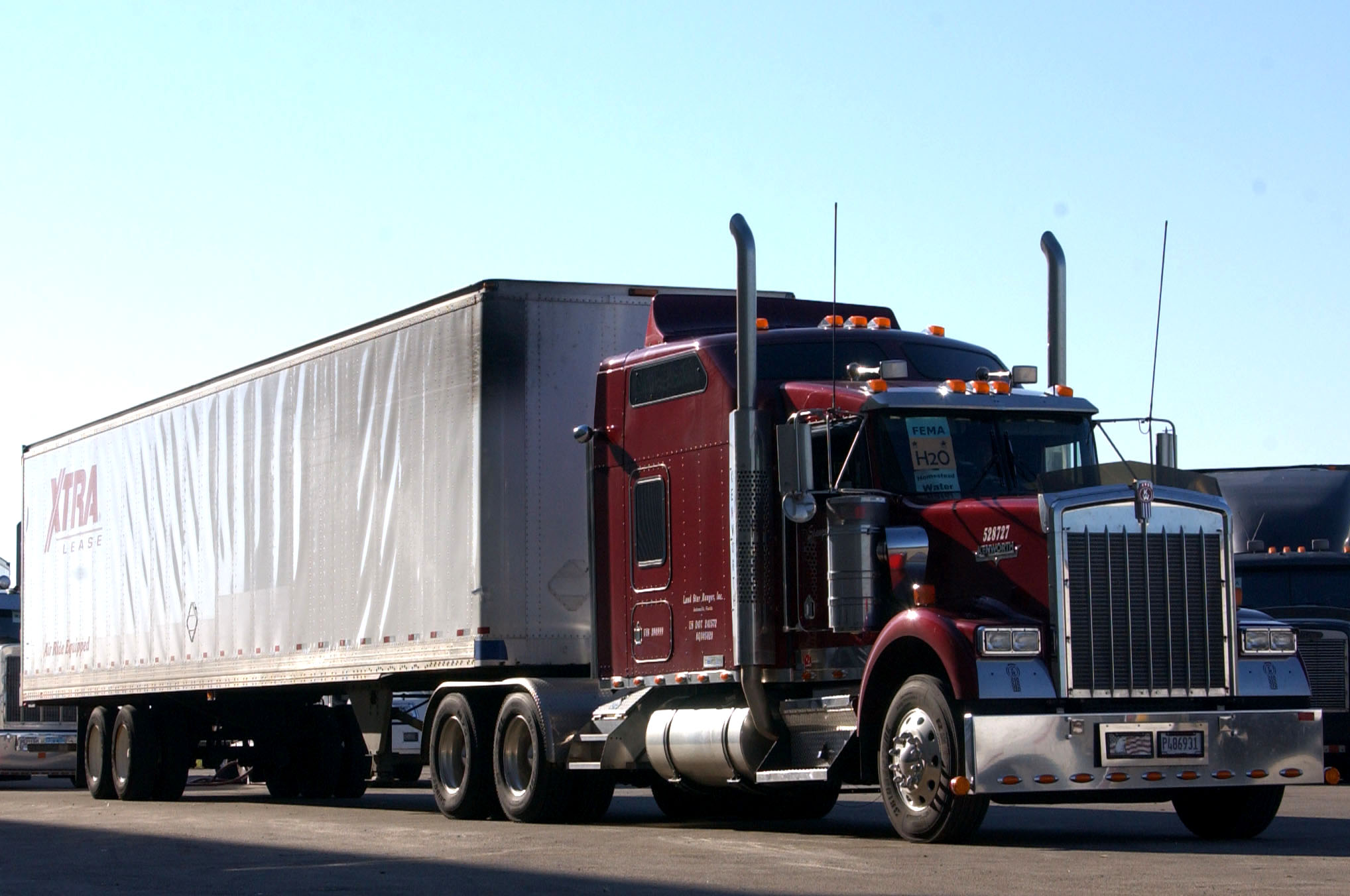
A standard dry van trailer

Dropdeck
A flatbed with a lowered deck, featuring a raised step at the front, where the trailer attaches to the fifth wheel.

Dry bulk
A variation of the liquid tank trailer, with a funnel-shaped bottom, used for hauling bulk quantities of dry powder (sometimes called bulk pneumatic). Sometimes referred to as a 'Teat Truck' or 'Teater' due to its appearance. Usually loaded through holes in the top, unloaded through the bottom or through pneumatic force.

Dry van
A simple, enclosed non-climate controlled rectangular trailer that carries general cargo, including food and other products that do not require refrigeration. Usually loaded/unloaded through the rear doors, requiring elevated access for forklifts to enter the trailer.

Dump
A bucket-like trailer with an open top for loading, commonly used for hauling bulk quantities of dirt, rock, gravel, etc. See dump truck.

Flatbed
A flat trailer with no enclosure or doors. Can be loaded/unloaded from the sides or above, and does not require elevated access for forklifts.

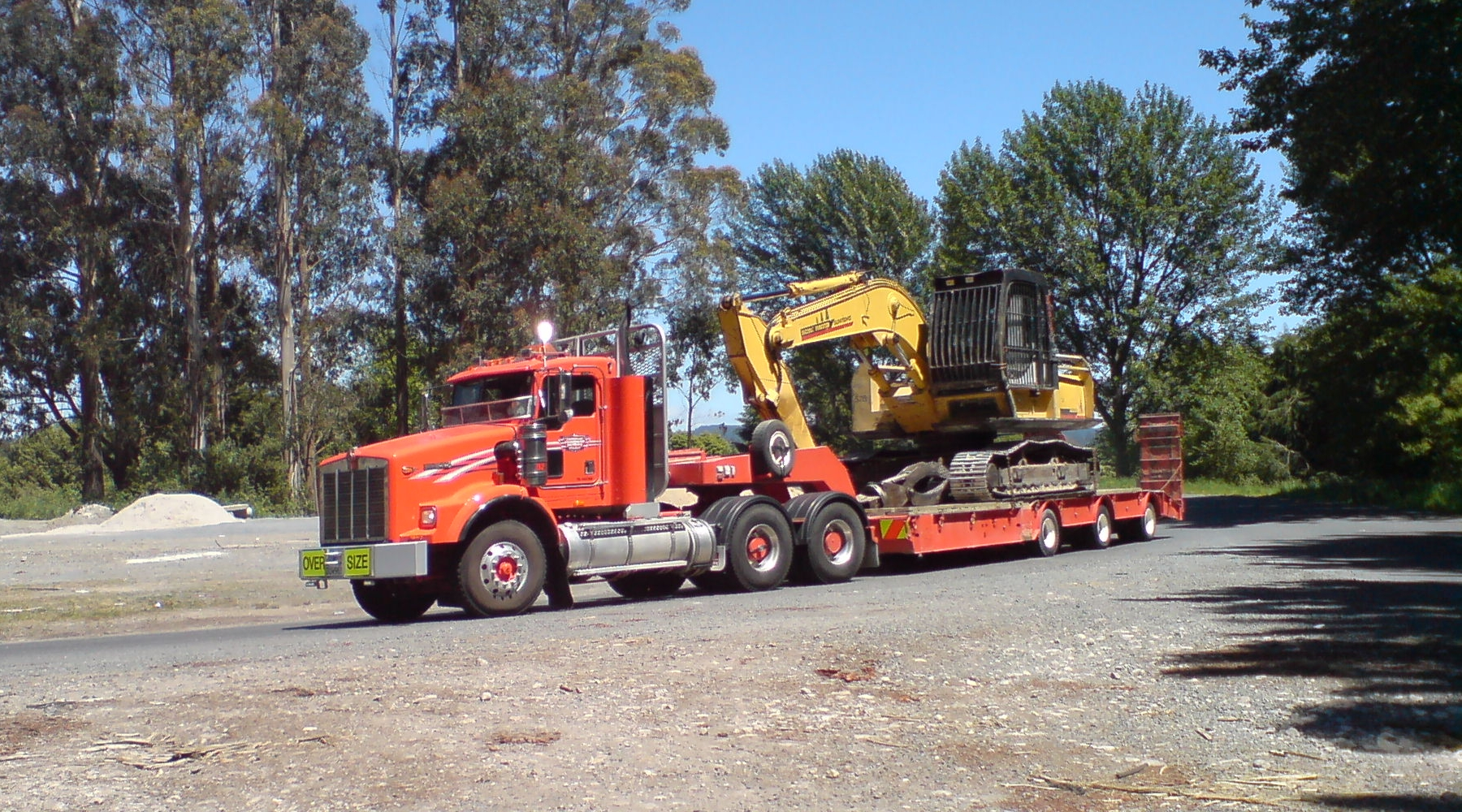
A gooseneck lowboy trailer with an oversized load

Gooseneck lowboy
A specialized lowered flatbed trailer featuring an arched coupling arm, normally used for oversize/overweight loads.

Grain or hopper-bottom trailer
A rectangular enclosure with an open top for bulk loading, covered with a tarp, and a funnel shaped bottom for unloading grain, fertilizer, etc.

Hopper
See grain.

Livestock
A rectangular enclosure with sides featuring numerous ventilation holes, an interior with multiple levels, and usually a ramp in the rear for loading/unloading. Used for hauling cows, pigs, sheep, etc.

Live-bottom
A dry van with solid or openable roof with a moveable mechanized floor for unloading.

Logger
See timber.

Lowboy
See double dropdeck, or gooseneck lowboy.

Platform
See flatbed.

Portable parking lot
See auto transport.

Pup
A trailer between 26 feet (7.9 m) and 29 feet (8.8 m) long that can be used singularly as a delivery trailer in congested areas or in combination with another trailer for over the road.

Rear dump
A dump with a rear pivot point allowing the front of the cargo area to be raised vertically for unloading through the rear.

Reefer
See refrigerated van.

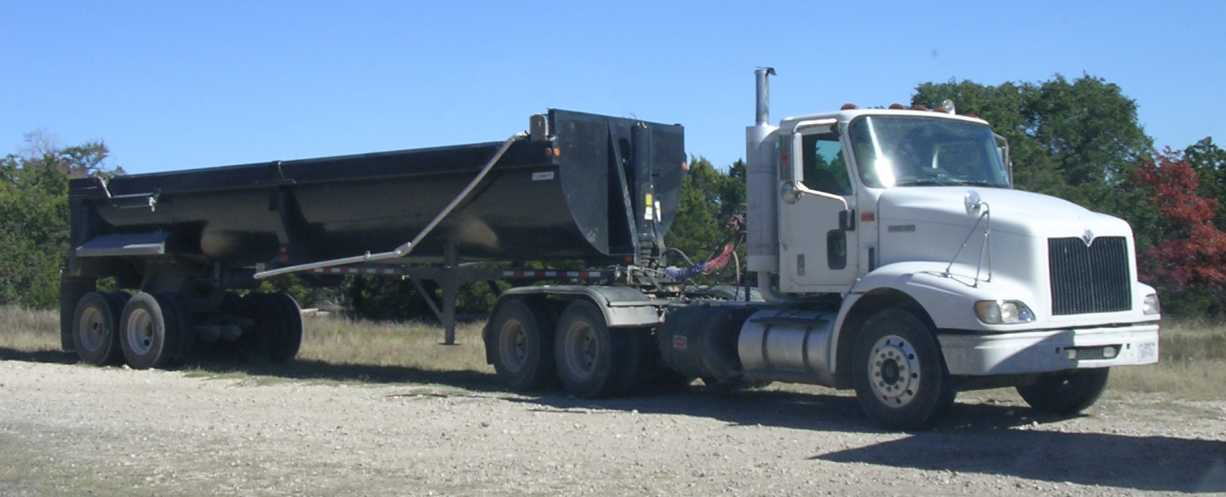
A rear dump trailer with a daycab tractor

Refrigerated van
A refrigerated and insulated box trailer.

Side kit
See covered wagon.

Sideloader
(aka Sidelifter) A specialized container trailer with cranes on the front and rear to allow for on-the-spot loading and unloading.

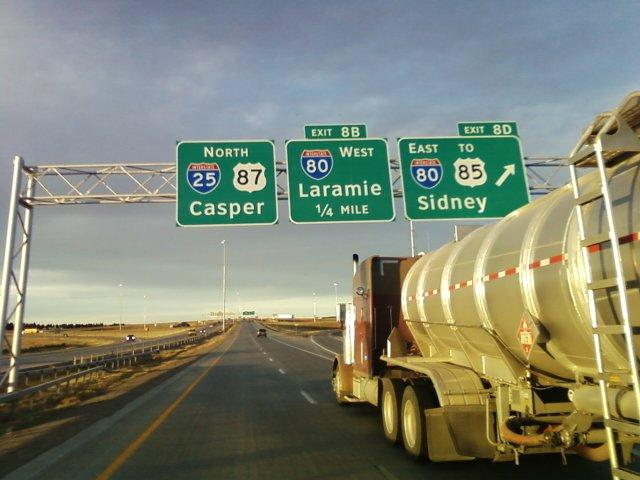
A tank trailer on Interstate 25 at Interstate 80 in Cheyenne, Wyoming

Skateboard
See flatbed.

Stepdeck
See dropdeck.

Tank
An enclosed cylinder-shaped tank used for hauling bulk quantities of liquid.

Tanker
See tank.

Timber
A specialized trailer, used for transporting logs, consisting of a basic chassis with vertical stakes along the sides to hold the logs in place. There are several types of timber trailers: long wood trailers; usually with four stakes, but can have more, evenly spaced for tree length logs to be carried longwise on the trailer; short wood trailers, with two separated sets of four of stakes, commonly referred to as a double bunk, and piggyback trailers. These trailers can be self loaded onto the back of a truck

== Trailer configurations ==
'B' train Double
A special set-of-doubles: the second (usually shorter) trailer is hooked directly to the first via a fifth wheel on the rear of the first one (two semis).

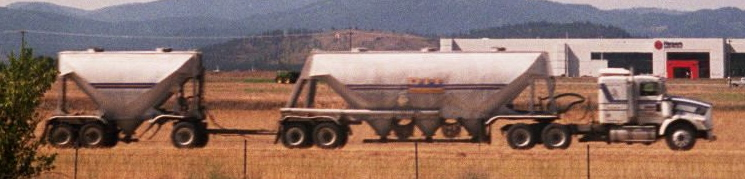
A rocky mountain double configuration with two dry bulk trailers

Rocky Mountain Double (occasionally called an 'A' train)
A combination of a standard trailer and a shorter pup trailer. Legal in more than 20 states, use is usually restricted to toll roads, freeways, or by permit.

Standard
A single trailer. Common dimensions range from 45 feet (14 m) to 53 feet (16 m) long, and up to 13.5 feet (4.1 m) tall.

Triple
A combination of three pup trailers. Legal in 17 states, usually restricted to major highways, toll roads, or freeways.

Turnpike Double
A combination of two standard trailers. Legal in 18 states, these unusually long combinations are usually restricted to toll roads or freeways.
