= Braun's Express =

American transportation and logistics company

Braun's Express, Inc.
- Type: Private
- Industry: Transportation and logistics
- Founded: 1967; 59 years ago
- Founder: Joe Braun
- Headquarters: Dalton, Georgia, U.S.
- Area served: Northeastern United States; Midwestern United States
- Owners: David Normandin; Cynthia Normandin
- Website: braunsexpress.com

Braun's Express, Inc. is a privately owned and operated American freight company serving the Northeast, Mid-Atlantic, and Midwest United States. Braun's specializes in supply-chain management for carpeting and flooring products, but also offers general less-than-truckload (LTL) shipping.

== History ==
Braun's Express was founded in the 1930s by Joe Braun of Medway, Massachusetts as a single-truck delivery business. The business was purchased and incorporated in 1967 by Roy Nutting. The company's growth accelerated when it developed delivery of airfreight outside the Boston-Route 128 area. In 1978 Braun's became one of the first trucking companies in the area to use computers in the office. The company was bought by David and Cynthia Normandin in 1982. David had joined the company as a driver in 1978 and became Braun's president in 1981. Cynthia, owner of LTL and truckload carrier Normandin Transportation and a former math teacher, joined the company in 1985.

In 2009, Braun's operated five terminals along the east coast and by 2011 was operating 120 power units and 300 trailers from four terminals. The next year, Braun's acquired Surfaces Transport, Inc. and expanded its service area to include the Midwest, with new terminals in Illinois, Minnesota, and Wisconsin.

In 2015, a Braun's Express vehicle being operated in Brooklyn, New York, struck and killed a pedestrian.

In 2022, Braun's opened new terminals in Elkhart, IN and Taylor, MI and added service to the states of Indiana and Michigan. This was followed by another terminal in Washington Court House, OH and service to all of Ohio. In 2024 the company launched service to all of Iowa.

== Operations ==
Braun's Express operates terminals in the following cities:

- Dalton, Georgia
- Hopedale, Massachusetts
- Bolingbrook, Illinois
- Cranbury, New Jersey
- Elkhart, Indiana
- Elkridge, Maryland
- Milwaukee, Wisconsin
- Saint Paul, Minnesota
- Syracuse, New York
- Taylor, Michigan
- Washington Court House, Ohio

== Sustainability ==
Braun's Express joined the Environmental Protection Agency (EPA) SmartWay Transport Partnership at the program's inception in 2004. The company was an early adopter of fuel-saving strategies, including single-wide tires, automatic tire-inflation systems, and battery-powered auxiliary power units (APUs) versus the more common diesel-powered units. Braun's was named a "Massachusetts Energy Leader" in 2009 and was awarded an Environmental Merit Award by the EPA's New England region in 2010 and 2016.

== See also ==
- Averitt Express
