= Idle reduction =

Attempts to reduce idling of vehicle engines

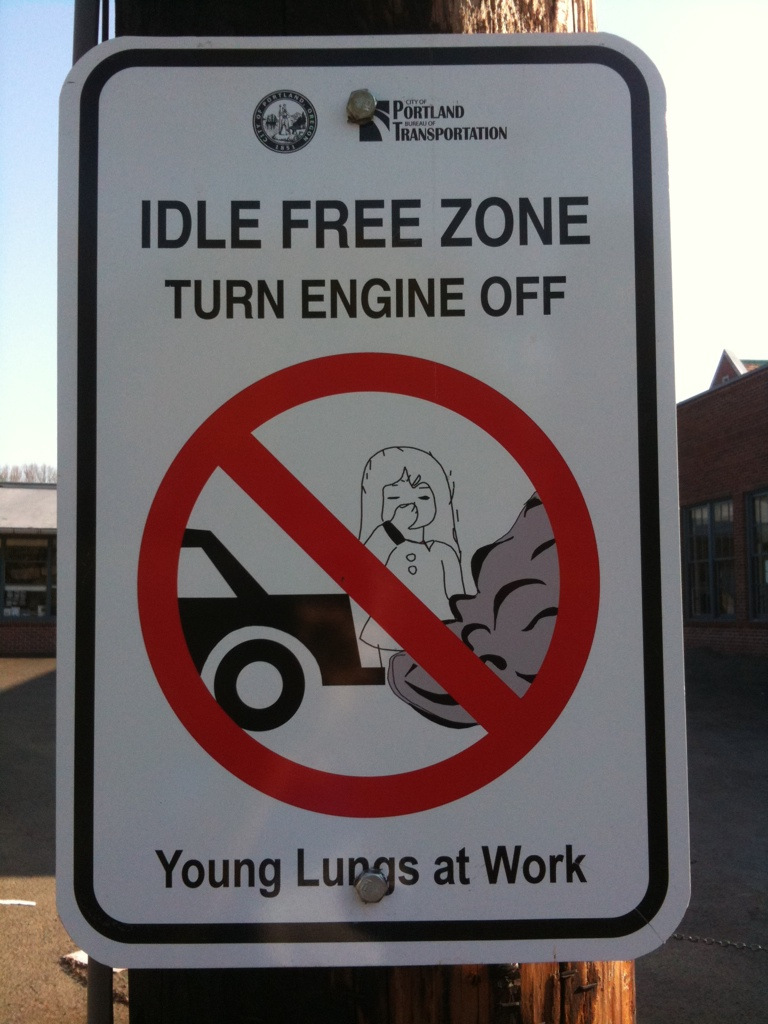
Idle free zone turn engine off sign

Idle reduction describes technologies and practices that minimize the amount of time drivers idle their engines. Avoiding idling time has a multitude of benefits including: savings in fuel and maintenance costs, extending vehicle life, and reducing damaging emissions. An idling engine consumes only enough power to keep itself and its accessories running, therefore, producing no usable power to the drive train.

For cargo ships, the need to run the ship's engines for power in port is eliminated by techniques collectively described as cold ironing.

Idle reduction equipment is aimed at reducing the amount of energy wasted by idling trucks, rail locomotives or automobiles. When a vehicle's engine is not being used to move the vehicle, it can be shut off entirely — thereby conserving fuel and reducing emissions— while other functions like accessories and lighting are powered by an electrical source other than the vehicle's alternator. Each year, long-duration idling of truck and locomotive engines emits 11 million tons of carbon dioxide, 200,000 tons of oxides of nitrogen, and 5,000 tons of particulate matter into the air.

There are other technologies that can reduce the use of fuel to heat or cool the cab when the vehicle is traditionally idling overnight. These can be battery or fuel powered but in either case, use less fuel, do no harm to the vehicle's engine, and reduce or eliminate emissions. Other vehicles, including police, military, service trucks, news vans, fire trucks, ambulances, and hydraulic bucket trucks can be equipped with mobile power idle reduction systems, similar to a rechargeable battery. The systems are usually installed in the trunk and can provide up to 10 hours of additional power for equipment operation without engine engagement. When used by law enforcement and the military, idle reduction technology increases mission capability by extending operational time and providing increased situational awareness and safety.

Idle reduction is a rapidly growing trend in US federal, state, local and fleet policy. Idling contributes significantly to the transportation sector's portion of yearly greenhouse gas emissions. The US Department of Energy is putting forth a huge effort through the Energy Efficiency and Renewable Energy Program to increase public awareness about decreasing petroleum use; idle-reduction being one of the methods. The Alternative Fuels and Advanced Vehicles Data Center is a reliable resource for information regarding idle-reduction methods such as fuel-operated heaters, auxiliary power units and truck stop electrification.

== Background and problem ==
In the public sector, idling is common. Police officers, public works employees, fire fighters, and EMTs who operate city fleet vehicles run them at idle to perform their duties which require them to operate equipment. The emissions generated from these tasks by cities all over the U.S. contribute to the fact that each year U.S. passenger cars, light trucks, medium-duty trucks, and heavy-duty vehicles consume more than 6 billion gallons of diesel fuel and gasoline — without even moving. As fuel prices continue to rise, a major challenge in fleet management is how to keep service vehicles on the road to serve the public while staying within budget. Reducing idle time also reduces emission of carbon dioxide, one of the prime factors in causing global warming. By some estimates, an automobile with a 3-liter engine burns 1.5 L (0.4 US gal; 0.33 imp gal) of gasoline per hour of idling, and generates about 0.5 kg (1 lb) of CO_{2} every 10 minutes.

Idle reduction is particularly significant for vehicles in heavy traffic and trucks at the estimated 5,000 truck stops in the US. Many hybrid electric vehicles employ idle reduction to achieve better fuel economy in traffic. America's fleet of around 500,000 long-haul trucks consumes over a 3.8 billion L (1 billion US gal; 0.83 billion imp gal) of diesel fuel per year. The trucking industry has analyzed the impact of idling on engines, both in terms of maintenance and engine wear costs. Long-duration idling causes more oil and oil filter deterioration and increases the need for more oil and filter changes. Similarly, the longer the idling time, the sooner the engine itself will need to be rebuilt. The trucking industry estimates that long duration idling costs the truck owner $1.13 per day, based on the need for more frequent oil changes and sooner overhaul costs. Services such as AireDock, IdleAire and Shorepower provide power at truck stops to resting truckers who would otherwise need to continue idling during mandatory breaks. Because the United States Department of Transportation mandates that truckers rest for 10 hours after driving for 11 hours, truckers might park at truck stops for several hours. Often they idle their engines during this rest time to provide their sleeper compartments with air conditioning or heating or to run electrical appliances such as refrigerators or televisions.

The problem of anti-idling is most commonly associated with heavy duty diesel engines because they are the biggest contributors when idling. As an example of the need for idling an engine, school bus drivers on a cold morning may go out to their bus and turn it on to warm up the engine in order to provide direct heat to the cabin when they return to their bus to start their morning routes, which brings up two of the main reasons for idling, driver mentality and the need for passenger comfort. This idling period can be considered excessive, though excessive idling is defined and regulated differently in different parts of the country.

== In the United States ==
Policies at the federal level are more focused towards research and development of technologies, economic incentives, and education. The Department of Energy (DOE) is sponsoring several corporate companies in the R&D of new anti-idling technologies with the hope that this technology will be installed and incorporated in the assembly line or possibly at the dealer as an option. The Environmental Protection Agency (EPA) also has many ways to promote idle reduction. The EPA established the SmartWay Transport Partnership that provides information about available anti-idling technologies, possible strategies for idle reduction, and resources for obtaining financing on anti-idling projects. The program also serves as an EnergyStar-like program with a label available to companies that commit “to improve the environmental performance of their freight delivery operations.” The EPA has a national campaign called the Clean School Bus Campaign which works to reduce diesel fuel consumption in school buses across the nation. Several regions were awarded millions of dollars through grant projects including idle-reduction pilot projects.

Various states and localities have passed laws pertaining to idling. Some of the laws are more strict and stringent than others. Thirty-one states currently have some sort of existing regulations pertaining to anti-idling. Of these states, California has the most codes and regulations. The California Air Resources Board has enacted numerous laws that regulate idling in the state. For example, in Virginia, the excessive idling threshold is ten minutes, though, in many west coast states such as Hawaii and California, where there is a larger presence of greener policies in relation to fuel consumption, the thresholds are drastically smaller and may even have no idling tolerance at all. According to Hawaii Administrative Rules §11-60.1-34, no idling is permitted “while the motor vehicle is stationary at a loading zone, parking or servicing area, route terminal, or other off street areas” with a couple of exceptions. “Each year, long-duration idling of truck and locomotive engines consumes over 1 billion US gallons (3,800,000 m^{3}) of diesel fuel and emits 11 million tons of carbon dioxide, 200,000 tons of oxides of nitrogen, and 5,000 tons of particulate matter into the air.”

At the local level, there are many municipalities that have enacted anti-idling regulations. New York is an example of states making their idling policies more strict. In early 2009, New York Mayor Michael Bloomberg signed legislation that reduced the amount of time non-emergency vehicles could idle when they are located near schools. The new legislation reduced the allowed idling time from three minutes to one minute. In addition, the new law authorized the Department of Parks and Recreation and the Department of Sanitation to enforce the new idling laws. Previously, only the police department and the Department of Environmental Protection had this authority. Civilians are also allowed to report violations under the new law. New York's Citizens Air Complaint Program allows citizens to report idling vehicles – citizens get a share of the collected fine. The New York Times reported in 2022 that the program led to a massive increase in complaints against idling vehicles.

In 2017, the City of Palo Alto began considering a proposal to stop drivers from running engines when parked.

Truckers argue for the need for idling to keep their cabins comfortable overnight at truck stops. Further complaints have come from the lack of concurrence among state and local idling laws. This disparity in laws requires truckers travelling across the country to be aware of the local idling laws in every place they visit. Even consistency between state and local laws has been a concern. Some truckers have expressed concern that some idling laws could prevent them from complying with other laws, For example, laws requiring truckers to get a certain amount of uninterrupted rest might be interfered with by anti-idling laws. The transportation blog uShip.com, Ship Happens states that “[anti-idling] laws fail to consider the truckers well-being and place drivers at risk of debilitating fines for noncompliance.” These fines could run as high as $25,000 in Connecticut for idling for more than three minutes.

== United Kingdom ==
Unnecessary vehicle idling is an offence against the Road Traffic (Vehicle Emissions) (Fixed Penalty) (England) Regulations (Statutory Instrument 2002 No. 1808) and may incur fines

The regulations apply in zones designated as Air quality management areas by local authorities. The Department for Environment, Food and Rural Affairs has published a list of local authorities with air quality management areas.

There is similar legislation in Scotland and Wales, but it is unclear whether Northern Ireland has similar regulations. Fines are set at £20, but local authorities may decide to set them higher. However, enforcement is minimal.

== Europe ==
In Europe, vehicles increasingly include a Start-stop system to prevent idling.

== Hong Kong ==
Hong Kong introduced an anti-idling bill in 2010.

== Technologies ==
=== Fuel-operated coolant heaters ===
Fuel-operated coolant heaters reduce the need to run engines at idle to warm vehicles such as buses. Directly heating the coolant is more fuel-efficient than using the engine's waste heat, reducing fuel consumption and emissions. In general, coolant heaters burn 1/8 as much fuel as an idling engine would, simultaneously emitting 1/20 of the emissions and directing heat significantly faster to the passenger compartment.

=== Auxiliary power units ===
Auxiliary power units (APUs) are commonly used on semi-trucks to provide electric power to the cabin at times when the cabin or cargo need to be heated or cooled while the vehicle is not in motion for an extended period of time. This period of time is usually overnight, when the truck driver has parked at a truck stop for some rest. Instead of having to keep the engine idling all night just to maintain the temperature in the cabin, the APU can turn on and provide power. Most commonly, the APU will have its own cooling system, heating system, generator, and air conditioning compressor. Sometimes the APU will be integrated into those components of the semi itself. APUs are also commonly used in police cruisers as an alternative to idling. Since a significant amount of time is spent in the cruiser while stationary, idling becomes a major source of cost to police fleets, though, most police fleets have idling policies. The drawback of APUs on police cruisers is that they are normally kept in the trunk where they take up valuable space.

=== Truck stop electrification ===
Federal safety regulations developed by the Federal Motor Carrier Safety Administration, require that truckers must rest ten hours for every eleven hours of consecutive driving. As a result, drivers spend extended periods of time resting and sleeping inside the cabs of their trucks. To maintain comfort and amenities, most long haul truck drivers idle their engines for close to ten hours per day to power their heating systems and air conditioners, generate electricity for on-board appliances, charge their vehicle's batteries, and to warm their engines in colder weather. Given that trucks typically consume 0.8 gallons (3.03 L) of diesel fuel per hour of idling, between 900 and 1,400 gallons (3406 to 5300 L) of fuel are consumed each year per truck, resulting in significant greenhouse gas emissions. Truck-stop electrification (TSE) and auxiliary power unit technologies provide long-haul truckers with the ability to heat, cool, and power additional auxiliary devices at truck stops without requiring them to idle their engines.

The United States Department of Transportation estimates there are approximately 5,000 truck stops on the U.S. highway system that provide overnight parking, restrooms, showers, stores, restaurants and fueling stations. The United States Department of Energy maintains a website that lists current TSE sites throughout the United States. As of October 2013, the website records 115 TSE stations throughout the country.

Truck stop electrification allows a trucker to “plug-in” to power their on and off-board electrical needs. There are two types of truck stop electrification, on-board and off-board systems. On board TSE solutions allow trucker's the ability to recharge their batteries at truck stops via standard 120 Volt electrical outlets. Truckers can then utilize the truck's batteries to power appliances and provide heating and cooling to the truck cab. Typically, on-board TSE solutions require some vehicle modification. Off-board TSE solutions do not typically require any vehicle modifications, as they provide heating and air conditioning services via an overhead unit and hose that connects to the truck's window. In addition to heating and cooling, these connections can also offer standard electrical outlets, internet access, movies and satellite programming. Normally, private companies provide and regulate either system and can charge an hourly rate for services, typically around $1.00-$2.00 an hour. Both of these options can generate revenue for truck stop operators, and decrease operating expenses for truckers relative to the cost of diesel fuel. The cost of electricity to provide overnight power to trucks can save up to $3,240 of fuel that would normally be consumed by idling per parking space. Truck stop electrification can allow truck drivers to abide local idling regulations and reduce noise to neighboring establishments.

The cost of implementing a single TSE site can vary greatly, depending on the type of technology that is employed. Installation costs for technology that provides external power to operate equipment on board a truck range from $4,500 to $8,500 per space, whereas the costs to provide a window based power unit (i.e. an off board apparatus) range from $10,000 to $20,000 per space. Costs for an individual truck operator to install an on-board system capable of utilizing shore power from a TSE space can cost up to $2,000.

=== Idle management/control ===
Idle management technologies have been developed as an upfitting solution to answer idling concerns. Similar to a start-stop system, idle management technologies can control the vehicle while in Park are Neutral, which allows for extensive control when the vehicle is in its primary state of issue—at idle. Some idle management technologies are so comprehensive, they are able to manage the engine's on/off ignition while retaining control of auxiliary functions, such as vehicle climate, anti-theft, operator security, and more, even when the engine is powered off.

Idle reduction can also be achieved by more efficient control of stop lights and reducing congestion on roadways. States and municipalities that have employed data analytics to reduce bottlenecks and improve traffic flow—which reduces idling—include Austin, Texas and the state of Florida.

== See also ==
- Start-stop system
