= Truck stop =

Refueling facility for truck drivers

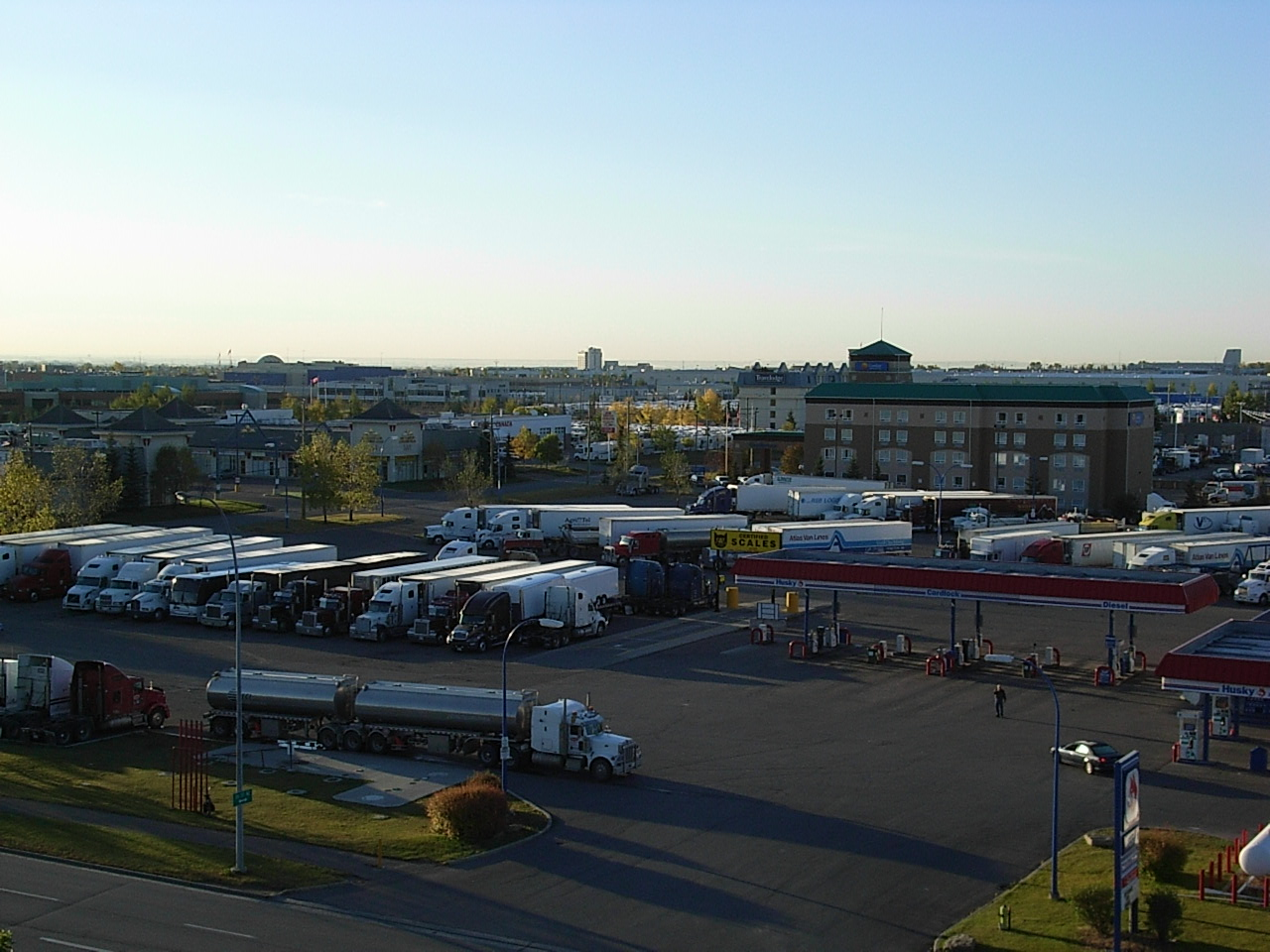
A Husky truck stop in Calgary in Alberta, Canada

A truck stop (known as a service station in the United Kingdom, a travel center by major chains in the United States and a roadhouse in rural Australia) is a commercial facility which provides refueling, rest (parking), food, and other services to motorists and truck drivers. Truck stops are usually located on or near a busy road.

== Truck stop services ==
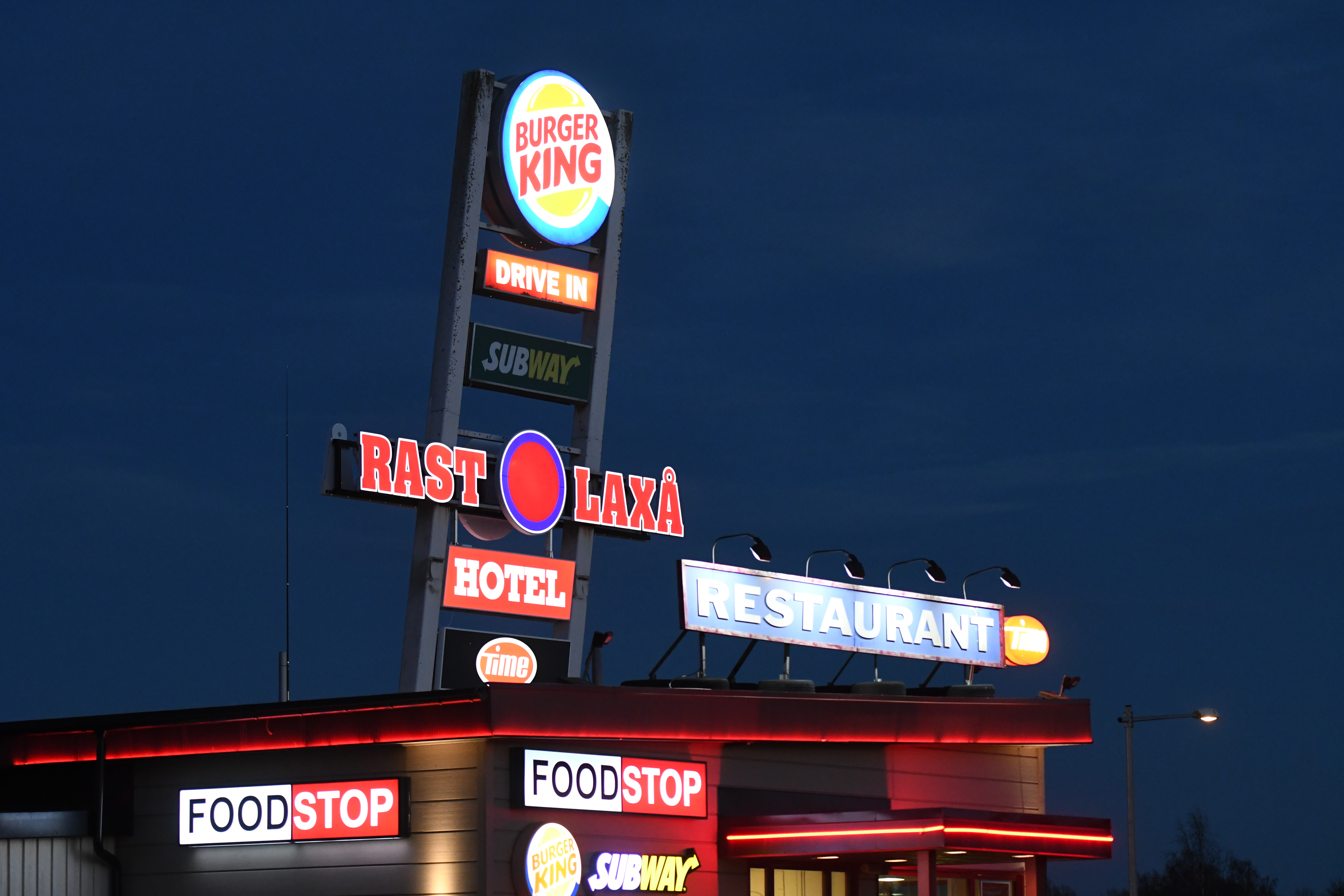
English signs at truck stop in Laxå, Sweden.

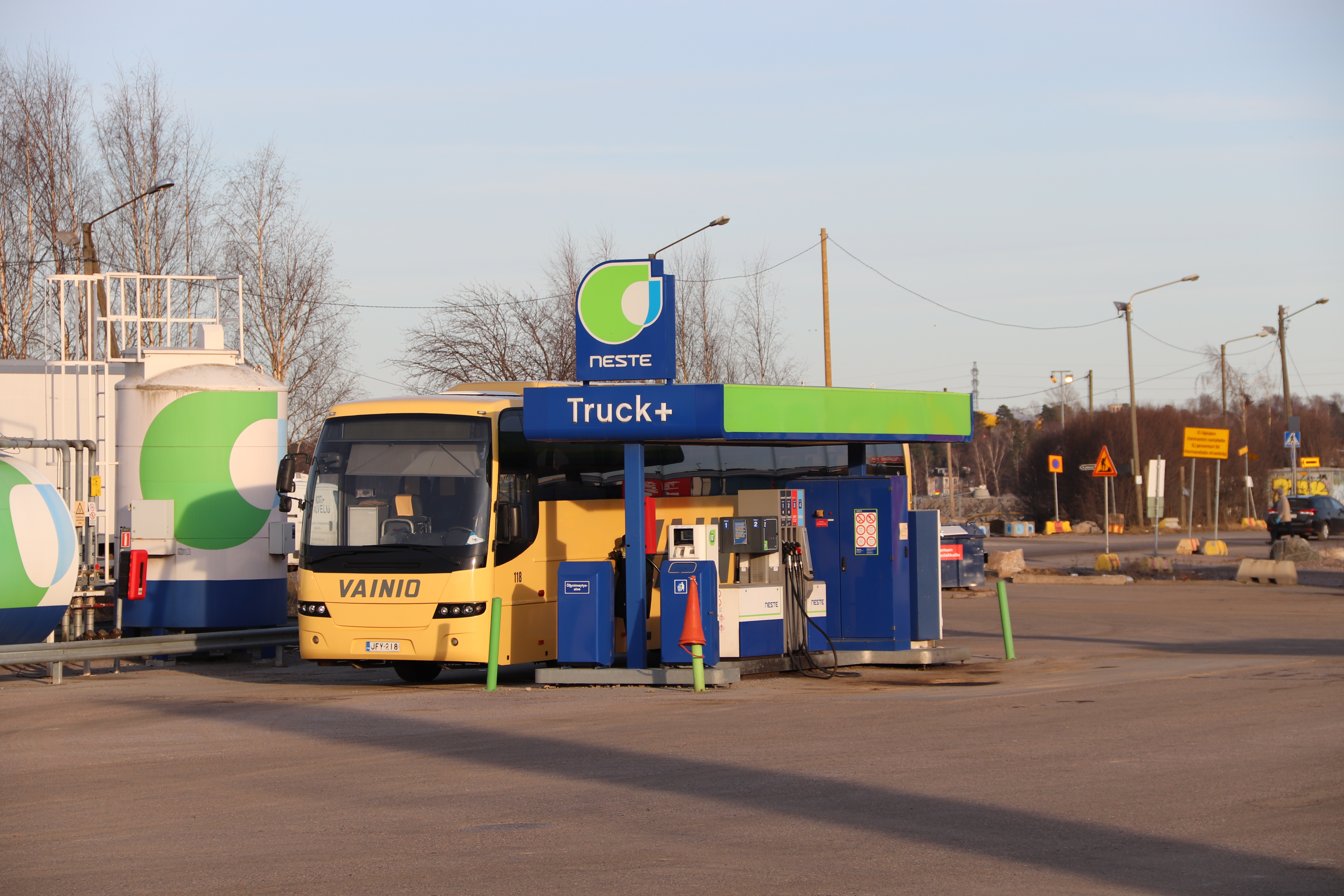
Neste's petrol station for trucks and buses in Helsinki, Finland.

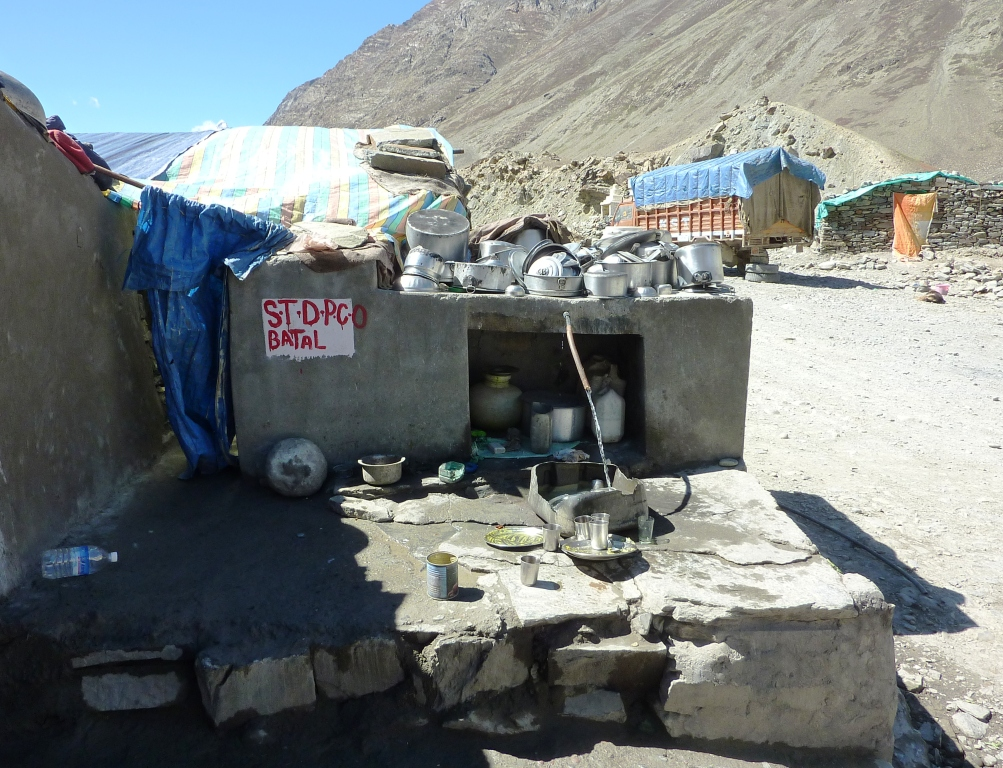
Truck stop on route between Leh and Key Monastery.

Smaller truck stops might consist of only a parking area, a fueling station, and perhaps a diner restaurant, or transport café (U.K. English). Larger truck stops might have convenience stores of various sizes, showers, a small video arcade, and a TV/movie theater (usually just a projector with an attached DVD player). The largest truck stops, like Iowa 80 (the largest in the world), might have several independent businesses operating under one roof, catering to a wide range of travelers' needs, and might have several major and minor fast-food chains operating a small food court. Larger truck stops also tend to have full-service maintenance facilities for heavy trucks, as well as vehicle wash services that can handle anything from passenger vehicles to large trucks. Some truck stops operate motels or have them adjacent. Most truck stops now offer separate fueling areas, often with dedicated entrances, for standard-sized passenger vehicles. The truck refueling area almost always offers dual pumps, one on each side, so large trucks can fill both tanks at once. (The second pump is referred to as the "slave pump" or "satellite pump.")

The fuel islands at many truck stops can get very crowded. Most trucking companies have accounts with one or two truck stop chains and, after negotiating a specific price for diesel, require their drivers to fuel exclusively at supported locations. Truck stops near a large city, or on the east or west coasts, suffer from the most congestion at their fuel islands.

The retail stores in large truck stops offer a large selection of 12-volt DC products, such as coffee makers, combo television units, toaster ovens, and frying pans primarily targeted towards truck drivers, who often spend extended periods of time on the road. Such shops generally offer a wide selection of maps, road atlases, truck stop and freeway exit guides, truck accessories (such as CB radio equipment and hazmat placards), plus entertainment media such as movies, video games, music, and audiobooks. Increasingly, as interstate truck drivers have become a large market for satellite radio, these retail stores also sell various satellite radio receivers for both XM and SiriusXM as well as subscriptions to those services. Kiosks run by cellular phone providers are also common.

Most long-haul tractors have sleeping berths, and many truck drivers keep their diesel engines running for heating or cooling for the sake of comfort. Because idling diesel engines make considerable noise (and are a source of pollution) they are often banned from such use near residential areas. Truck stops (along with public rest stops) are the main places where truck drivers may rest peacefully, as required by regulations. Modern innovations, such as truck heaters and auxiliary power units, are becoming more common, and some truck stops now provide power, air conditioning, and communications through systems such as IdleAir. Many truck stops used to have load board monitors for truck drivers to find real time information on loads, jobs, weather and news. However, DAT Solutions, the largest provider of load boards, removed its monitors from thousands of truck stops and moved all its services online and to its load board mobile apps. Most chain truck stops also have WLAN Internet access in their parking areas. Idle reduction—reducing the amount of fuel consumed by truck fleets during idling—is an ongoing economical and environmental effort.

== Australia ==
In Australia a roadhouse is a filling station (service station) on a major intercity route. A roadhouse sells fuel and provides maintenance and repairs for cars, but it also has an attached restaurant (usually a café or diner) to sell and serve hot food to travelers. Roadhouses usually also serve as truck stops, providing space for parking of semi-trailer trucks and buses, as well as catering to travelers in private cars. In remote areas such as the Nullarbor Plain, a roadhouse also offers motel-style accommodation and camping facilities.

Approximately two-thirds of truck stops are independently owned with the remainder being owned and run by 'Big Oil' brands such as Caltex, BP and Shell.

== Germany and Austria ==
Historic German Autohof sign from 1947

The Autohof sign in Germany since 2001

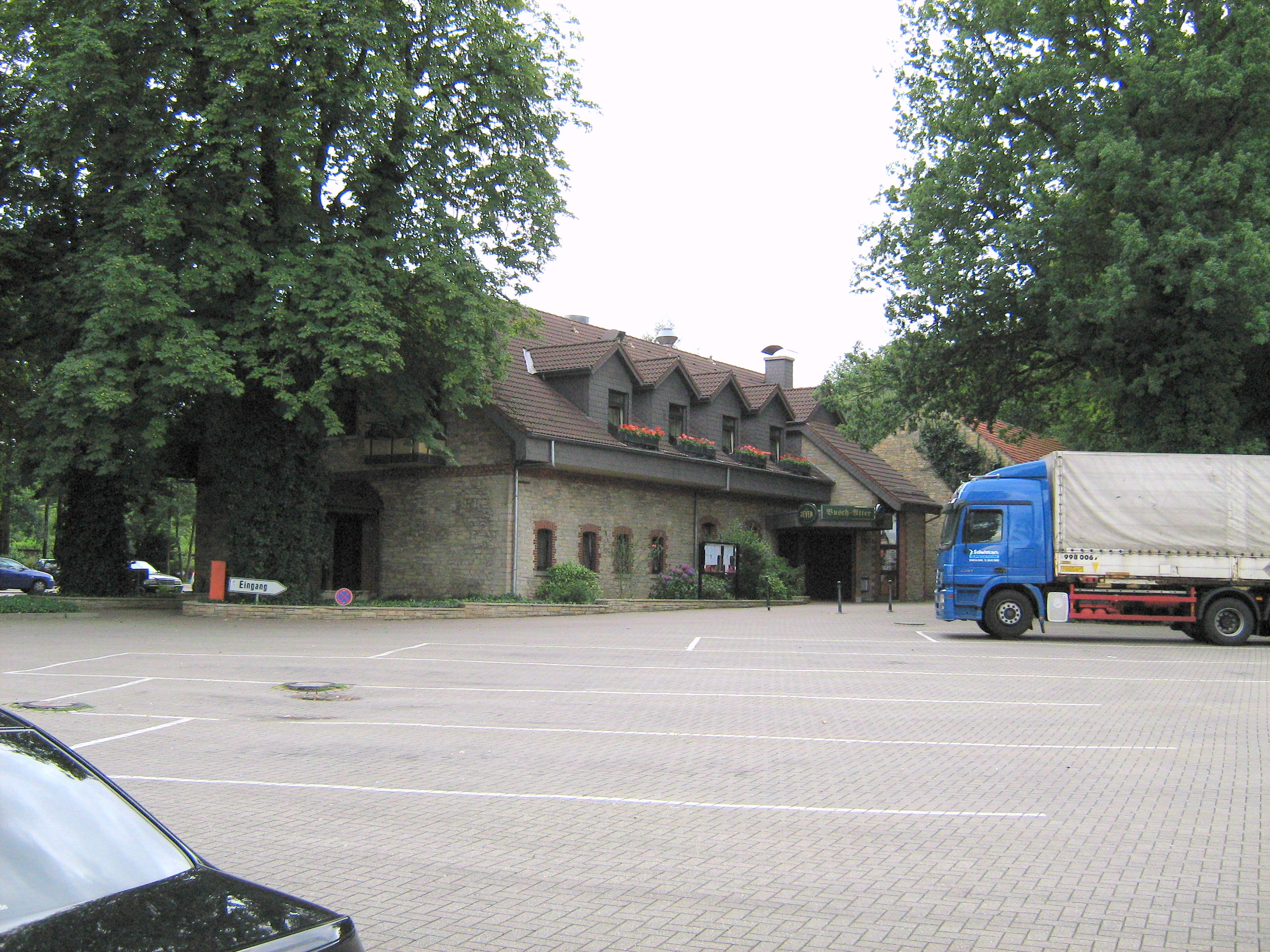
Restaurant at the Autohof Osnabrück

In Germany and some parts of Austria there were newer official developments to the existing highway service station. The often state owned service stations on the highway were insufficient to deal with the growing number of lorries and the necessary stops for lorry drivers to rest. Since 2001, the traffic regulations of Germany Straßenverkehrs-Ordnung include a road sign, Autohof, literally car yard or automobile court.

An Autohof is run by a private company, but the government provides the road signs at the highway, indicating an Autohof, if the facility:

- is no more remote from the highway than one kilometer
- can be approached by lorries
- provides at least 50 places for lorries, or at least 100 at higher frequented roads, those places must be apart from the places for other cars
- is open 24 hours a day, all year through
- offers gasoline service 24 hours a day
- offers meals from 11.00 to 22.00; other food for the rest of the day
- includes sanitary facilities for handicapped people and the proper needs of lorry drivers

== United Kingdom ==
In the United Kingdom, the term "truck stop" is not in common use and the equivalent stops are motorway services. There are relatively few areas on motorways just for trucks to stop at. Most designated rest areas are used by every sort of motor vehicle.

On A roads (major routes which are made to a lower standard compared to motorways), a truck stop may have no refueling facilities but simply offer a place for tired drivers to rest and/or get food and drink in a transport cafe. They may not be signposted well, if at all.

Notable truck stop locations in the UK include:

- Ashford (M20, J10)
- Rothwell (A14, J3 )
- South Mimms (M25, J23/ A1(M), J1)
- Ellesmere Port (M56, J10)
- Chippenham (M4, J17)

== United States ==
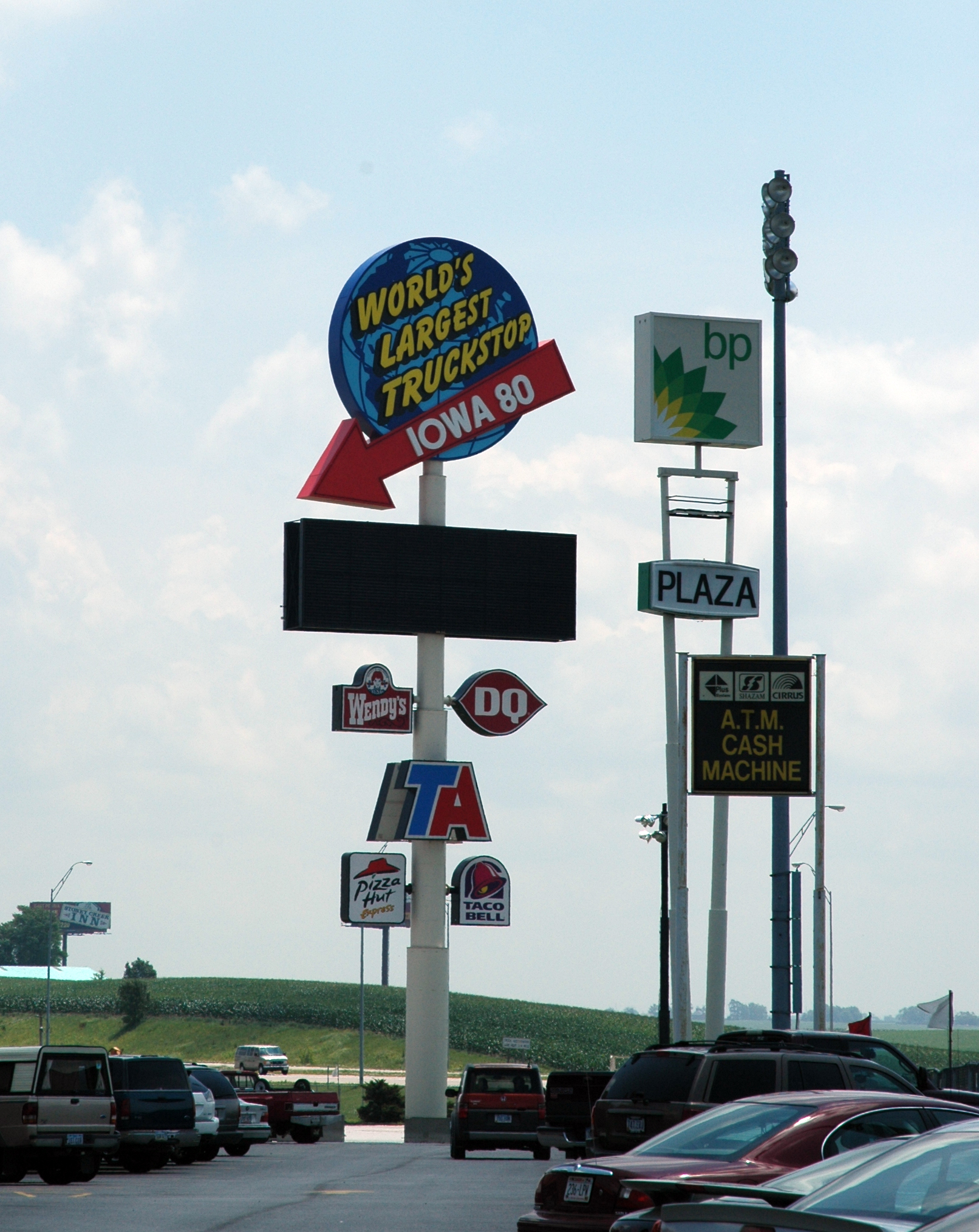
Signage for Iowa 80, the world's largest truck stop. It is located in Walcott, Iowa.

The truck stop originated in the United States in the 1940s as a reliable source of diesel fuel not commonly available at filling stations. This, coupled with the growth of the Interstate Highway System, led to the creation of the professional haulage and truck stop industries. They generally consist of, at the very least, a diesel grade fueling station with bays wide and tall enough for modern tractor/trailer rigs, plus a large enough parking area to accommodate from five to over a hundred trucks and other heavy vehicles. Truck stops should not be confused with rest areas or motorway service areas which cater mostly to cars and are often run by or leased from a government or tollway corporation.

In the United States in the late 1990s, Truckstops of America (T/A) changed its name to TravelCenters of America to reflect this marketing strategy. There is no exact distinction between "truck stop" and the newer term "travel center", but some differences are size, proximity to interstate highways and major roads, the number of services, accessibility to automotive and RV travelers, and a certain extra emphasis on facility appearance. Many truck stops chains such as Love's, Flying J and T/A also serve the recreational vehicle market. All the national chains have established customer loyalty programs to promote repeated patronage.

In Louisiana, truck stops meeting certain criteria may operate on-site casinos with up to 50 video poker machines. These truck stops are regulated by the Louisiana Gaming Enforcement Division and must maintain certain amenities to be eligible to retain these machines. Required amenities include a certain total land area, a certain number of tractor/trailer parking spaces, an on-site restaurant, and trucker's supplies, showers, telephones, television lounge, scales, laundry services, and fuel.

Truck stops were often depicted in films and novels as being somewhat seedy places, frequented by aggressive bikers, petty criminals, and prostitutes (e.g. the "lot lizards" in the JT LeRoy novel Sarah). This may be an outdated stereotype, as most modern truck stops are generally clean and safe, becoming a "home away from home" for many truck drivers. However, most truck stops reflect the social environment of their local area; consequently, one occasionally finds seedy truck stops in seedy areas. According to John McPhee's book Uncommon Carriers, truck stops in rural areas are typically very safe and wholesome. However, as the distance to major cities decreases, the incidence of prostitution, drug peddling etc. increases dramatically. In the mid-2000s, the Vince Lombardi service area on the New Jersey Turnpike near New York City had the country's most rampant prostitution.

== Corporatization ==
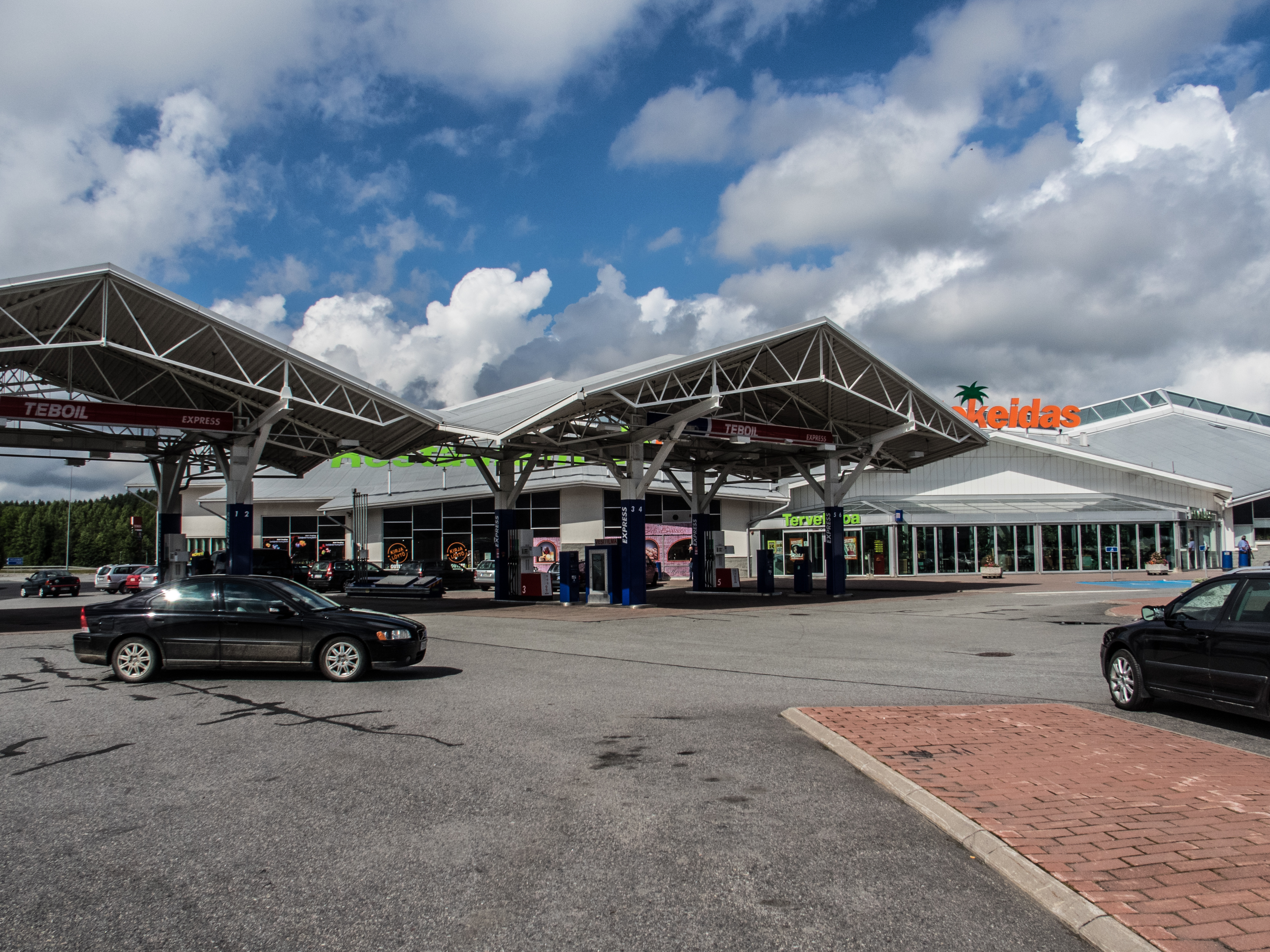
The Autokeidas truck stop in Forssa, Finland also offers services to people other than just truck drivers.

The economics of truck stops have driven most of the small, post-war operations out of business and they have been replaced with large corporate chains or franchises. Truck drivers are a captive market, because the trucks' size and local regulations place severe restrictions on where a truck driver can park. The initial investment in land, permits, equipment and maintenance requirements are large and growing: accordingly, some large truck stop chains have begun to cater to a wider range of the traveling public by combining trucks stops and traditional gas stations.

== See also ==
- Caravanserai
- Dhaba
- Greasy spoon
- Iowa 80 – the world's largest truck stop
- Love's Travel Stops & Country Stores
- Pilot Flying J
- Rest area
- Road Ranger
