= SmartWay Transport Partnership =

U.S. government business organization

SmartWay Transportation Partnership LogoU.S. Environmental Protection Agency

The SmartWay Transport Partnership is a business organization administered by the United States government and designed to encourage businesses to manage logistics in an environmentally responsible way. The program was formed in 2004, and is administered by the United States Environmental Protection Agency (USEPA) and is housed with the USEPA's Office of Transportation and Air Quality (OTAQ) - Transportation and Climate Division (TCD). SmartWay aims to voluntarily achieve improved fuel efficiency and reduce environmental impacts from freight transport. SmartWay currently has approximately 600 member businesses, membership is voluntary. The organization provides incentives and recognition for top performers to encourage continued improvement.

== Background and history ==
The Partnership was officially launched on February 9, 2004, with the support of 15 charter members and the backing of the American Trucking Associations. Since its inception, the Partnership has expanded to include more than 600 companies and affiliates.

Partnership members are encouraged to improve fuel savings and reduce emissions in several ways. Freight carriers may upgrade their truck fleet with various fuel saving technologies and idle reduction methods. Other possible strategies include:

- wind deflectors on the tops, sides, and rear of trucks, to reduce aerodynamic drag;
- fuel-efficient tires and tire inflation systems to reduce rolling resistance;
- idle reduction equipment to power and cool the cab while the truck is not in motion, allowing the engine to be shut off;
- the use of speed governors; and
- the use of hybrid powertrain systems, especially for urban operation trucks.

SmartWay Affiliates, which include various state government agencies and trade groups, play a promotional role for SmartWay by educating policy actors and their members about the benefits of the Partnership.

== Goals of the partnership ==
By 2012, the SmartWay Transport Partnership aimed to save between 3.3 and 6.6 billion gallons of diesel fuel per year, which translates to eliminating between 33 - 66 million metric tons of carbon dioxide emissions and up to 200,000 tons of nitrous oxide emissions per year. The Partnership also aimed to reduce large amounts of particulate matter (PM).

== Technologies ==
- Semi-trailer aerodynamic device, including trailer skirts and trailer tails recognized under the SmartWay program

== See also ==
- Fuel efficiency
- Green vehicle
