= IdleAir =

Provider of in-cab services to truckers

- Type: Corporation
- Founded: Knoxville, 2000
- Headquarters: Knoxville, TN, U.S.
- Number of locations: 32
- Key people: Ethan Garber, CEO
- Website: idleair.com

IdleAir, a division of Convoy Solutions LLC, is a company that provides in-cab services to truckers via centralized systems at truck stops around the United States. IdleAir's service, the patented Advanced Travel Center electrification (ATE), was more complex and more expensive than traditional truck stop electrification (TSE) systems which are aimed at idle reduction reducing the amount of fuel consumed by trucks while they idle during rests.

Most TSE systems simply provide electricity to trucks parked in their slots. IdleAir's service is more comprehensive, including heating and air conditioning, phone service, Internet connectivity, television, and 120-volt electrical outlets. The ATE services are delivered by a distinctive yellow tube that hooks into the door window of the truck.

The company, formerly named IdleAire, was launched in June 2000 and filed for bankruptcy protection on May 12, 2008. In 2007, the widow of a trucker filed an $18 million lawsuit against IdleAire at Knoxville Court. Her husband, a trucker from Florida, had died of carbon monoxide poisoning while using the IdleAire system. According to the lawsuit the IdleAire device was marketed as capable of removing carbon monoxide, yet she alleged it had sucked up the exhaust gases of the truck. IdleAire had 131 locations in 34 states. A May 16, 2008 press release on their website stated that they expected to remain open, however, IdleAire officially closed on January 29, 2010. In 2008 some locations had been demolished.

Convoy Solutions LLC of Knoxville, TN, acquired the former IdleAire assets and relaunched the company as IdleAir in 2010.

Since being relaunched by Convoy Solutions in 2010, the new IdleAir has opened 32 locations in 12 states — Arizona, Arkansas, California, Georgia, Illinois, Minnesota, Missouri, New Jersey, Pennsylvania, Tennessee, Texas and Utah. IdleAir services are available at some major truck stops, including Pilot Flying J, Love's Travel Stops & Country Stores, Sapp Brothers, and TravelCenters of America (TA and Petro Shopping Centers) and Petro franchisee locations.

In 2014 a fuel price drop began forked IdleAir pricing. IdleAir started teaming with a solar power company to supply the trucks with self generated electric energy. Transports of frozen food is kept on temperature by diesel generators, powering electric reefers. The Big Boy’s Truck Stop in Kenly, North Carolina planned 24 new ATE for 2017 with estimate fuel savings up to 25,000 US gallons (94,635 L) per year. Before the completing this project, IdleAir was awarded for sustainability by the Tennessee Department of Environment and Conservation.

In August 2017, a 24-hour usage in Laredo, Texas cost US $35 - cheaper than a motel stay or idling the engine for the legally obligated resting time of 10 hours.
