= International Road Dynamics =

Software company in Canada

International Road Dynamics Inc.
- Company type: Subsidiary
- Industry: Traffic Management Systems
- Founded: 4 December 1980
- Headquarters: Saskatoon, Canada
- Area served: Worldwide
- Key people: Arthur Bergan (Chairman)
- Products: Weigh-in-motion scales Automated weigh stations Vehicle classifiers ITS electronics & software Toll systems Fleet management Traffic Radar Solutions; Access Control & Physical Security
- Services: Installation, service and maintenance
- Parent: Quarterhill
- Website: irdinc.com

International Road Dynamics Inc. is a road traffic management system engineering company headquartered in Saskatoon, Saskatchewan, Canada. Its services include automated toll roads, commercial vehicle inspection systems, traffic data collection products, and traffic management software.

IRD provides weigh-in-motion (WIM) systems that are capable of weighing vehicles while in motion and classifying them by axle spacings and speed. Information recorded includes individual axle weights, group axle weights, and gross vehicle weight (GVW). IRD's weigh-in-motion systems are used at highway inspection stations to sort vehicles, ensuring only overweight vehicles are stopped for inspection. This reduces wait times and improves traffic flow at weigh stations. IRD's WIM systems are also used by fleet managers to ensure vehicles are leaving terminals within the acceptable weight limits for their classification.

IRD is a subsidiary of Quarterhill, an Ottawa-based patent licensing company.

== History ==
Dr. Art Bergan, a world-renowned civil engineer in the transportation field, established IRD in the late 1970s. IRD's first product was weigh-in-motion scales.

By the mid-1990s, IRD had become established as a major player in the international Commercial Vehicle Operations (CVO) market. In 1995 IRD installed the world's first dynamic truck speed warning system for the Colorado Department of Transportation. Developed for the freeway west of the Eisenhower tunnel, the system incorporated sensors and an automatic scale to weigh and classify trucks. An algorithm was used to estimate the maximum safe speed for the vehicle as it approached the descent into the canyon. The speed was then displayed on a variable message sign accompanied by flashing lights.

IRD South Asia Private Ltd. is a wholly owned subsidiary of IRD that was established in 2000 and specializes in toll collection systems. As of 2011, IRDSA employs 160 people and has a 54-per-cent share of India's toll business. Company offerings include manual systems, smart card systems, and transponder systems. These systems include proprietary weigh-in-motion technology designed to help concessionaires reduce road-damage and revenue losses. IRDSA also manages data-collection services in cooperation with the National Highways Authority of India (NHAI).

IRD acquired the Germany-based PAT Traffic in 2003. By 2009, IRD had installed 10,000 IRD-PAT Bending Plate Scale weigh-in-motion systems.

In 2007, IRD acquired a 50% interest in Xuzhou-PAT Control Technologies Limited (XCPT), an Intelligent Transportation Systems company located in Xuzhou, Jiangsu, China. XPCT had distributed IRD's products in China since 2003. IRD's joint venture in China provides toll road systems, traffic monitoring, and maintenance.

In 2017, IRD was acquired by WiLAN (subsequently re-named Quarterhill) for $63.5 million.

IRD appointed Rish Malhotra as its President and CEO in 2020 as part of a planned leadership succession process.

In 2021, IRD acquired a 100% interest in the German companies Sensor Line GmbH and VDS GmbH and subsequently setup IRD Europe GmbH to integrate three European acquisitions and grow its business in Europe.
