= Drivewyze =

Intelligent transportation system

Drivewyze is an intelligent transportation system (ITS) service that provides bypasses to commercial vehicles as they approach participating state highway weigh stations. The participating vehicles' safety record, credentials and weight are verified automatically; further, if they comply with that state's screening rules for automated bypass, the vehicles are authorized to bypass these facilities rather than pull in for manual inspection. This results in time and fuel savings for the truck and less vehicle congestion at the weigh station.

Drivewyze is currently available at over 900 facilities across North America. More sites are scheduled to be added.

== Technology and functionality ==
The equipment on the commercial vehicle or truck can be either the driver's smartphone or an electronic on-board recorder (EOBR) / electronic logging device (ELD). The device is usually mounted on the dashboard of the truck. As a vehicle approaches a participating inspection or weigh station, the device communicates with the Drivewyze server via the cellular phone network and requests a bypass for the vehicle. Information associated with the device is then validated against state-required safety and credentials requirements. Weigh-in-Motion (WIM) technology is also used at some locations to verify the truck’s configuration and ensure its axle and gross vehicle weight are within acceptable limits.

Drivewyze has over 900 weigh stations in North America, making it the largest weigh station bypass network available.

== Enrollment qualifications ==
To enroll in Drivewyze, a driver or carrier must submit an application and provide license plate and USDOT number credentials.

== Additional services ==
Inspection site notification
A service that displays information about a nearby weigh station.
Driver safety notification
A service that displays advance information about high risk travel areas.

== See also ==
- PrePass
- NORPASS
