= MOSAID =

Canadian semiconductor technology company

MOSAID Technologies Incorporated
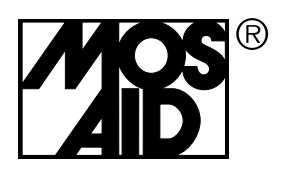
- Type: Private Company
- Industry: Semiconductor
- Founded: 1975
- Founder: Dick Foss, Bob Harland
- Fate: Taken private by Sterling Partners in 2011, renamed Conversant Intellectual Property Management in 2013, changed its name back to MOSAID in 2021
- Headquarters: Ottawa, Canada
- Key people: Boris Teksler, President & CEO Jamie McDole, General Counsel Pam Yeh, Chief Financial Officer
- Products: Semiconductor design services, Semiconductor Components, Reverse Engineering services, Test Systems, Patent Licensing
- Revenue: CA$82,926,000 (2001)
- Net income: CA$7,002,000 (2001)
- Number of employees: 233 (2001)
- Website: www.mosaid.com

MOSAID is a semiconductor technology company incorporated in Ottawa, Canada. It was founded in 1975 as a DRAM design company, and later branched out into other areas including EDA software, semiconductor reverse engineering, test equipment manufacturing and intellectual property licensing. MOSAID went public in 1994 with a listing on the Toronto Stock Exchange under ticker symbol "MSD". By 2011 the business was based exclusively on patent licensing and the company was acquired by Sterling Partners, a US-based private equity firm. MOSAID was renamed Conversant Intellectual Property Management in 2013. In 2021, the company announced it was changing its name back to MOSAID.

== Early Years before IPO (1975-1994) ==
MOSAID was launched in 1975 by Richard Foss and Robert Harland, who had been employed at Microsystems International. On their return from the 1975 ISSCC conference where they had presented a paper on MIL's 4kb DRAM, they found that they were no longer employed due to the company's bankruptcy proceedings. Their first project was a design for an improved 4kb DRAM which was sold to RCA. MOSAID went on to develop every generation of DRAM up to 256Mb in 1998.

Soon after the company was launched, Robert Harland invented the folded bitline DRAM architecture, a technique eventually adopted by the entire DRAM industry. The patent was sold to Standard Microsystems, whose head of R&D Paul Richman was a member of MOSAID's board of directors. The sale generated more than $1M which was used to fund the company's growth.

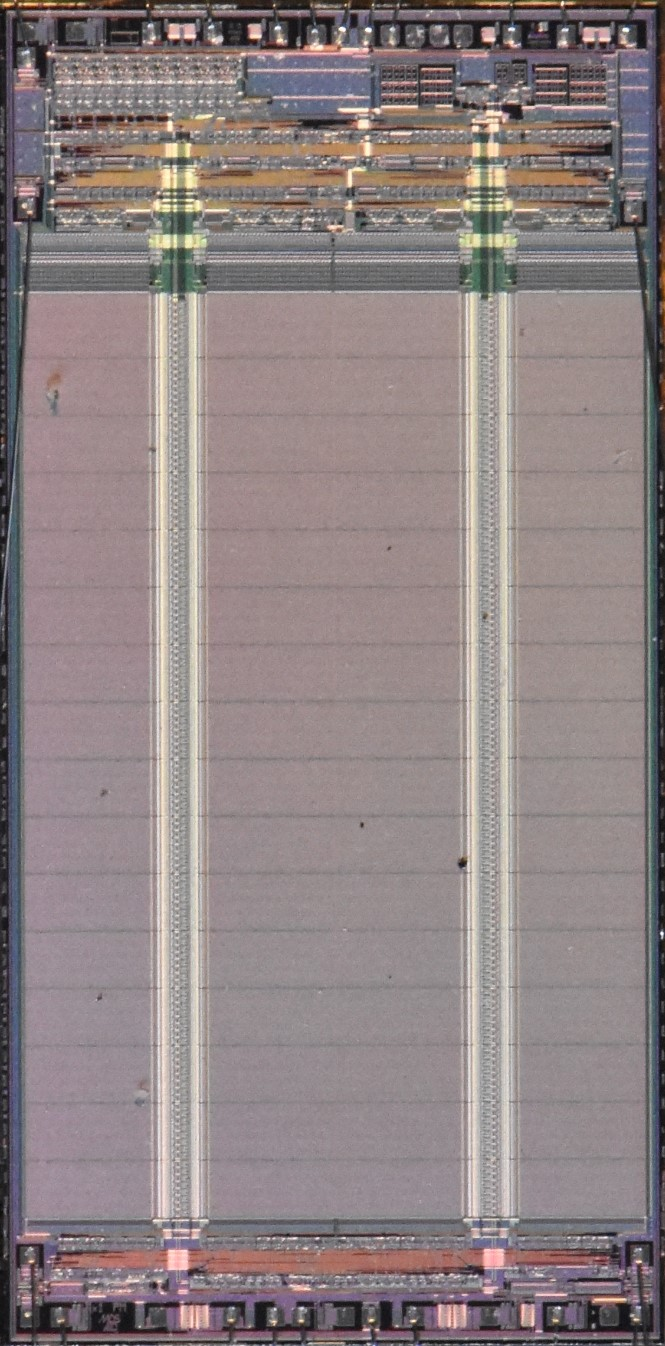
1Mb CMOS DRAM designed by MOSAID

In 1988, as the DRAM industry transitioned from NMOS to CMOS process technology, MOSAID started the design of a 1Mb CMOS DRAM employing a regulated high voltage pumped supply and static wordline driver to replace the conventional NMOS boosted wordline approach. This work resulted in the Foss and Lines patents which laid the foundations for MOSAID's patent licensing business.

EDA tools were developed for internal use and for external sales. The MOSAID 1000 circuit simulator ran on a PDP-11 minicomputer and could handle circuits having as many as 1000 nodes. MOSFIT, an efficient MOS transistor modelling program addressing short channel effects was developed and subsequently licensed to Keithley Instruments for use with their parameter analyzer products.

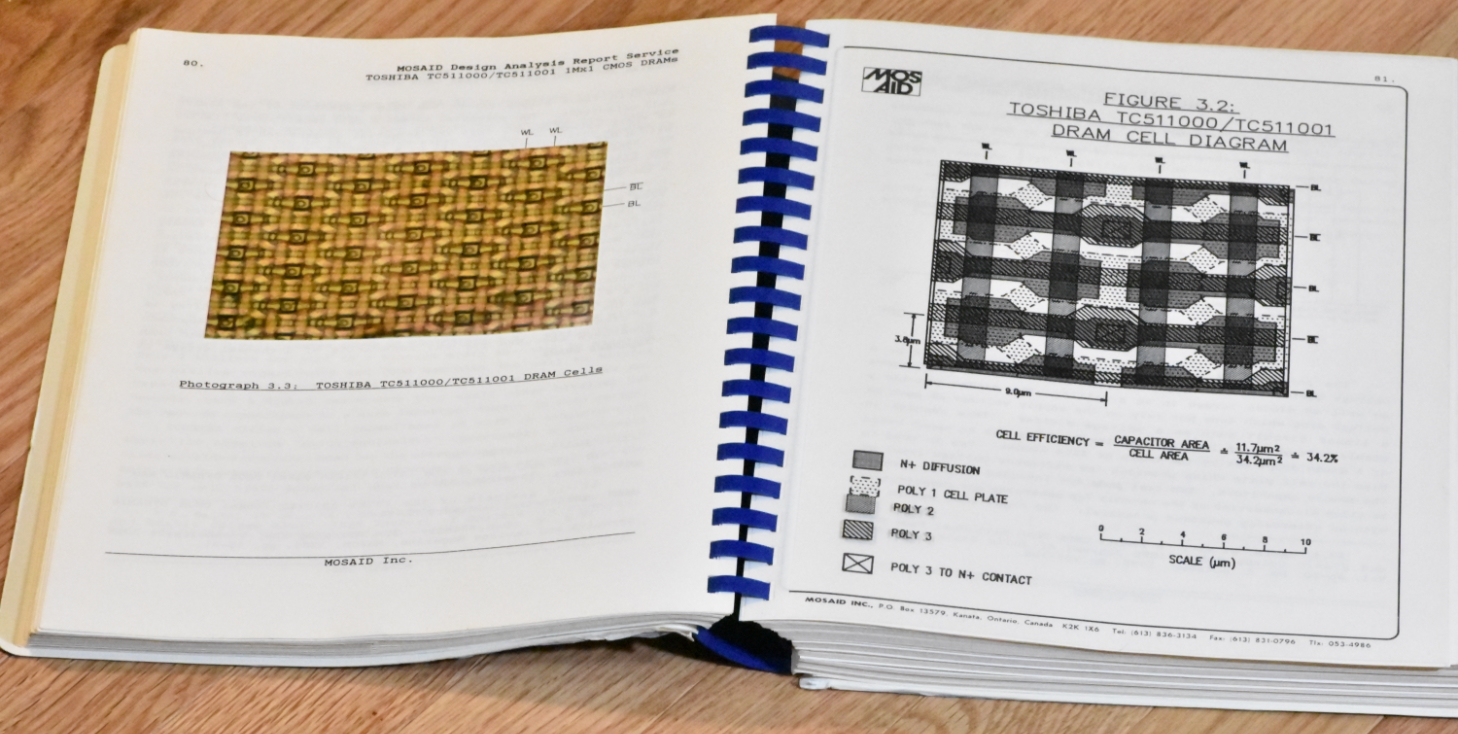
MOSAID reverse engineering report on the Toshiba 1Mb CMOS DRAM

During the early years MOSAID was perhaps best known for its reverse engineering reports focused mainly on semiconductor memory devices. These reports included complete circuit schematics, floorplans, simulations, extracted device parameters and sometimes critique of the techniques employed. The reports found wide use in competitive analysis, patent licensing negotiations, and outright copying of industry leading devices. The reverse engineering business was spun off in 1989 as Semiconductor Insights, now TechInsights. Other ex-MOSAID reverse engineering staff independently established Chipworks. Eventually, in 2016, TechInsights and Chipworks merged.

In 1982 the SRT-1 (Simple Memory Tester) was introduced. This was a benchtop unit within a Tektronix TM504 enclosure which displayed a bitmap on a CRT screen. Test patterns were set up with front panel switches and timing parameters adjusted with potentiometers. Absolutely no software was required. A California subsidiary was subsequently formed for sales and marketing.

In 1985 the MS2000 series of testers was launched. These were also benchtop units but were now controlled by a PC running Microsoft Windows. Ease of use was a key selling point with test setup controlled by a point and click graphical interface without the need to write test programs. The free-standing MS3400 series was introduced in 1991 to address emerging memory products such as flash and SDRAM. In 1997 the higher performance MS4100 series providing full speed testing of SDRAM was launched.

== Years as a Publicly Traded Company (1994-2011) ==
Following the IPO in 1994 MOSAID began development of custom embedded memory such as HDRAM, a high-density RAM for logic processes that was used by Newbridge Networks for a custom ASIC employed in the core of their ATM switch product. Accelerix, a joint venture with UK-based Symbionics was formed to develop a fully integrated 2D graphics accelerator and frame buffer in a merged DRAM-logic process. The Accelerix chip failed to gain market traction as 3D graphics accelerators were introduced. MOSAID continued designing industry standard DRAM components for semiconductor manufacturers. As a contributing member of the JEDEC standards organization, MOSAID helped define and develop some of the earliest Synchronous DRAM (SDRAM) devices and progressed to Double Date Rate (DDR) SDRAM as well. MOSAID was also active in the Synchronous Link DRAM (SLDRAM) Consortium, an open-standards based alternative to Direct RAMBUS DRAM (DRDRAM), and developed a 72Mb SLDRAM prototype for the members of the Consortium. Although SLDRAM did not enter high-volume production, many of the features were incorporated later into JEDEC DDR standards.

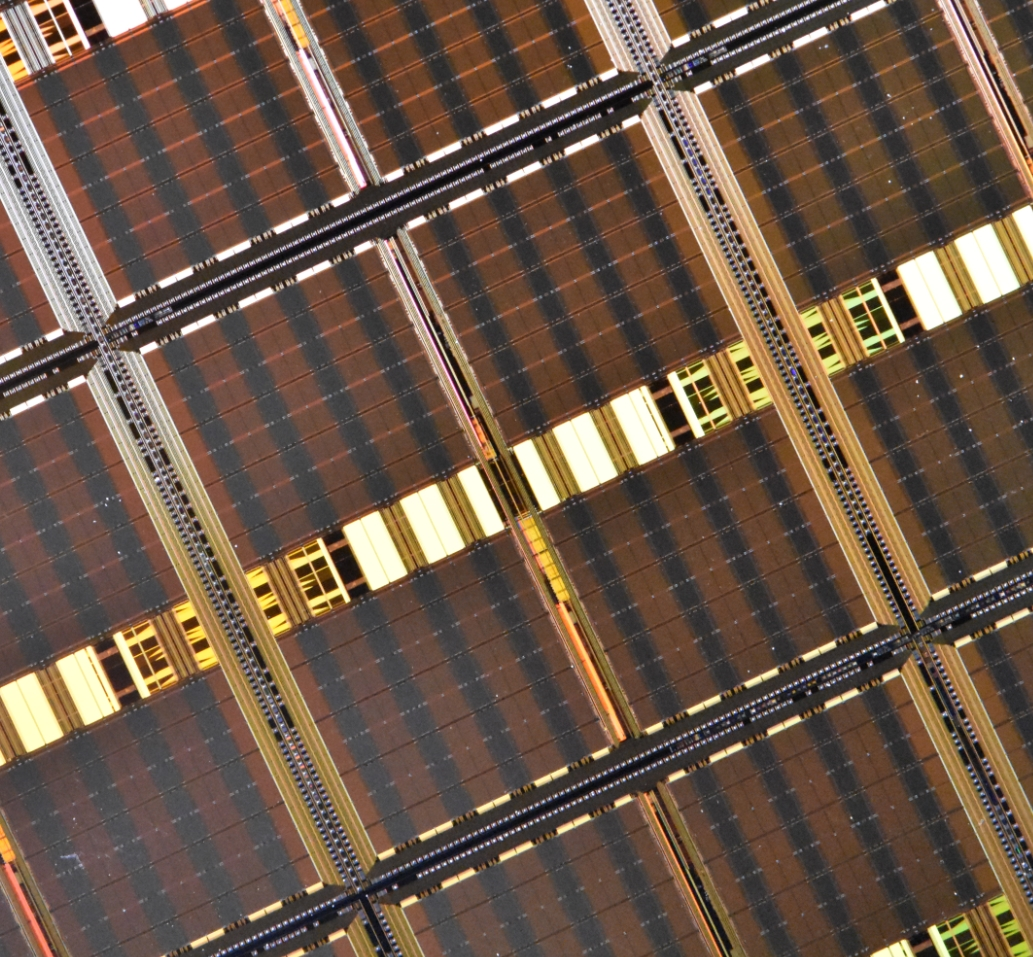
MOSAID 2Mb ternary dynamic CAM manufactured in TSMC 0.25um eDRAM process

1999 saw the development of several networking products to establish a MOSAID-branded fabless component supply business. These included a Gbit Ethernet switch on a chip with integrated DRAM switching fabric developed as a joint venture with Toshiba, a DRAM-based content addressable memory (CAM) for fast routing table lookup, and a multiprocessor cryptographic accelerator developed in partnership with Chrysalis-ITS. The dot-com crash in 2000 laid low MOSAID's plans to become a merchant semiconductor supplier.

Also in 1999 the first broad patent licensing agreement was signed with Fujitsu. Within a few years all the major Japanese DRAM manufacturers had licensed the MOSAID portfolio. The largest DRAM players would need litigation to encourage them to take a license, beginning with Samsung in 2001 followed by Infineon, Hynix, and Micron in later years. Patent licensing became MOSAID's most profitable revenue stream.

After the fabless component supply business shut down was completed in 2003, MOSAID entered the SIP (Semiconductor IP) market to provide silicon-proven macrocell blocks to system-on-chip developers. The first product was a DDR3 SDRAM interface and controller. California-based Virtual Silicon was acquired in 2005 to add standard cell libraries and PLL macrocells to the SIP offerings.

Following a shareholder proxy battle in 2007, the memory tester and SIP businesses were divested to focus on patent licensing. The SIP business was sold to Synopsys and the tester business was sold to Teradyne. Support and maintenance of the installed base of MOSAID testers was taken on by a startup company EPM Test. The company retained a small R&D group which developed a high performance NAND flash memory interface called HLNAND, which employed a synchronous point-to-point DDR ring architecture.

With the aging of MOSAID's home-grown patent portfolio, patent acquisitions were seen as the key to future growth. In 2011, in the midst of a hostile takeover bid from WiLAN, the company acquired a large portfolio of wireless patents from Nokia through its Core Wireless subsidiary. Shortly thereafter, the business was taken private by Sterling Partners, a US-based private equity firm.

== A Privately Held Company Once Again (2011-present) ==
In 2013, Sterling Partners and MOSAID established Longitude Licensing in Dublin, Ireland to hold and manage newly acquired patent portfolios. MOSAID subsequently provided resources to assist in the licensing of these portfolios. One such portfolio included thousands of memory related patents acquired from the leading Japanese DRAM manufacturer Elpida. Longitude Licensing was acquired in 2016 by Vector Capital, the owner of IPValue.

MOSAID was renamed Conversant Intellectual Property Management in 2013. In 2015, the R&D team along with the HLNAND technology was divested to Novachips, a Korean SSD controller company. The company enjoyed some modest success licensing the Core Wireless portfolio culminating in a transaction with RPX in 2020. In 2021, the company changed its name back to MOSAID while continuing with the intellectual property management business.
