= Weigh station =

Highway checkpoint to inspect vehicular weights

Weigh station on I-90 run by the Wisconsin State Patrol near Sparta, Wisconsin.

A weigh station is a checkpoint along a highway to inspect vehicular weights and safety compliance criteria. Usually, trucks and commercial vehicles are subject to the inspection.

Weigh stations are equipped with truck scales, some of which are weigh in motion and permit the trucks to continue moving while being weighed, while older scales require the trucks to stop. There are many different scales used, from single axle scales to multi-axle sets. Signal lights indicate if the driver should pull over for additional inspection or if they are allowed to return to the highway.

Many jurisdictions employ the use of portable scales, allowing weigh stations to be set up at any point. Portable scales allow states to set up temporary scales for situations such as seasonal check points, temporary checkpoints on isolated roads often used by trucks, or preventing drivers from avoiding scales at fixed locations. Portable scales may be set up at purpose built locations that are not normally staffed. A common reason for setting up portable scales is to monitor trucks during harvest season.

In rail transport, weigh stations are found in freight railway stations and are intended for the inspection of locomotives and freight cars.

== United States ==
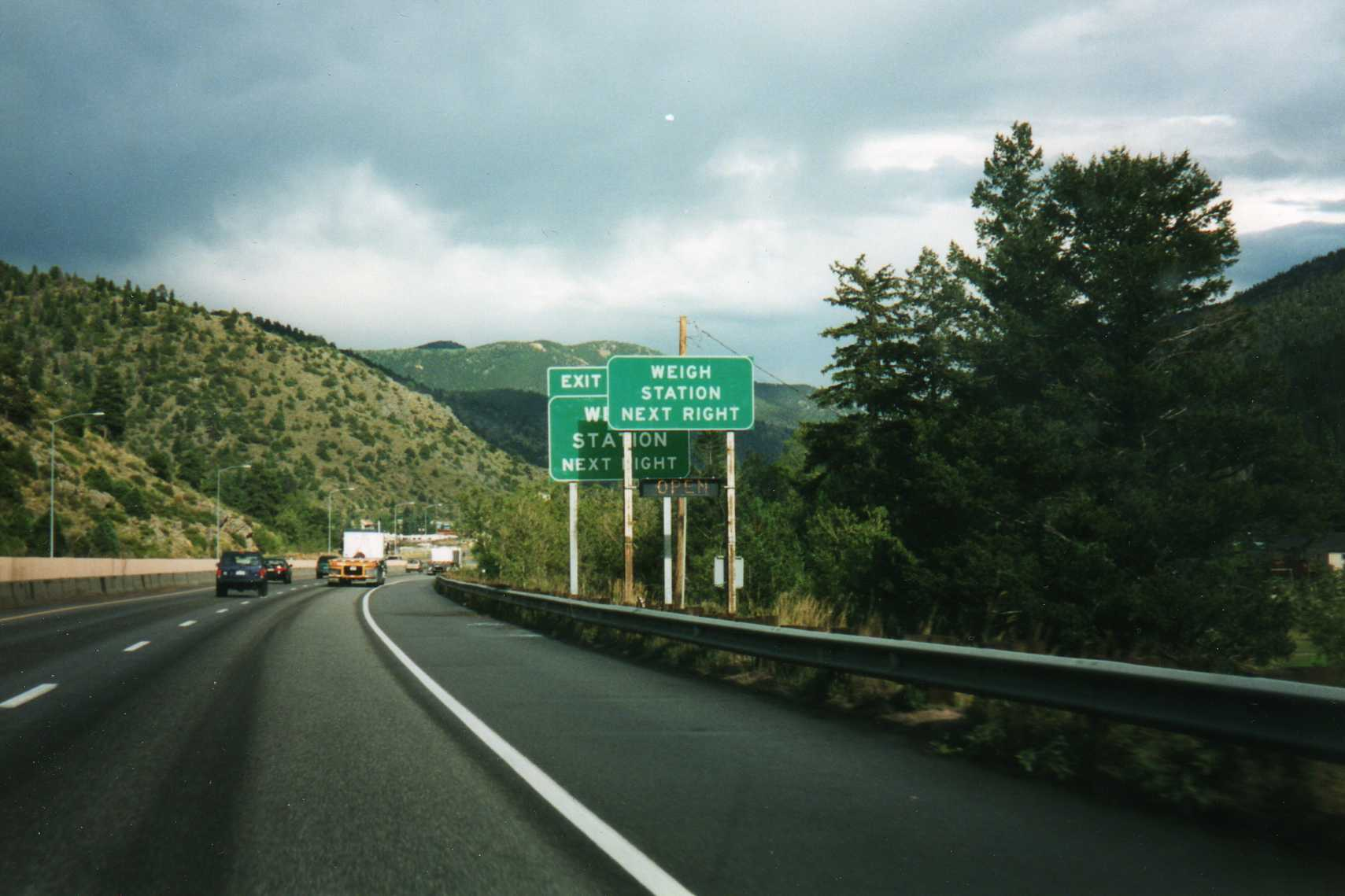
Road signs, like this one on Interstate 70 in Colorado, typically indicate that a weigh station is upcoming, and a signal indicates whether it is open.

A weigh station located near a state border is called a port of entry. States may also locate weigh stations in the interior of the state. Interior weigh stations are often located at choke points or areas where freight originates or is delivered. Many states have weigh in motion technology that allow a continuous flow of truck weighing.

Weigh stations were primarily created to collect road use taxes before IFTA created an integrated system of doing so. While taxes can still be paid at weigh stations, their primary function is now enforcement of tax and safety regulations. These include checking freight carrier compliance with fuel tax laws; checking weight restrictions; checking equipment safety; and checking compliance with hours-of-service regulations. Weigh stations are regulated by individual state governments and therefore have vastly different requirements from state to state. They are typically operated by the state's Department of Transportation (DOT) or Department of Motor Vehicles (DMV) in conjunction with the state highway patrol or state police, thus enabling enforcement of applicable laws. The federal maximum weight is set at 80,000 pounds (40 short tons; 36,000 kg). Trucks exceeding the federal weight limit can still operate on the country's highways with an overweight permit, but such permits are only issued before the scheduled trip and expire at the end of the trip. Overweight permits are only issued for loads that cannot be broken down to smaller shipments that fall below the federal weight limit, and if there is no other alternative to moving the cargo by truck. Permitted oversize trucks are often required to coordinate with the departments of transportation and law enforcement agencies of the transited states before the trip begins, as most states require oversize trucks to be escorted.

Many states also check freight paperwork, vehicle paperwork, and logbooks to ensure that fuel taxes have been paid and that truck drivers are obeying the hours of service (a federal requirement). Also, the truck and driver may have to undergo a DOT inspection, as most states perform the bulk of their DOT inspections at their weigh stations. In some cases, if a truck is found to be overweight, the vehicle is ordered to stop until the situation can be fixed by acquiring an overweight permit. In other cases, the driver may receive an overweight ticket and may or may not be required to offload the extra freight. Offloading the extra freight may not be practical for perishable or hazardous loads. The first state to implement a weight law was Maine, which set a limit of 18,000 pounds (9 tons; 8,200 kg) in 1918.

Two types of loads may result in overweight trucks: divisible and non-divisible. A divisible load is a load which can be easily divided into smaller parts, such as products that are shipped on pallets, automobiles or grains. A non-divisible load is a load which is unable to be divided into smaller parts, like a piece of equipment or a steel beam. All states provide permits for non-divisible loads though the truck may have restricted routing. Some states allow tolerances for any overweight truck. Some states have specific allowances for types of loads for which they will allow tolerances. For example, Wyoming allows 2,000 pounds (910 kg) for chains, tarps and dunnage that accompany a non-divisible load.

Truckers often refer to weigh stations as "chicken coops."

=== Electronic weigh station bypass ===
The California Manual on Uniform Traffic Control Devices specifies a sign requiring trucks to enter an upcoming weigh station unless given an in-cab signal.

Many states now use electronic bypass systems (or AVI - Automatic Vehicle Identification) to alleviate some of the truck traffic through the weigh station. Some of the best known are PrePass, NORPASS and Drivewyze. The system may consist of equipment at the weigh station itself, as well as a truck mounted transponder or smartphone, usually placed on the inside of the windshield or on the dashboard. The transponders are similar to those used for toll collection. Each transponder is directly registered to a specific truck, and contains a unique identification. The registration process propagates information such as carrier name, unit number, and elected gross weight to weigh stations. In addition, the system keeps a basic safety and compliance record for each vehicle. As a truck approaches a weigh station (approximately 1 mile [1.6 km] before), an electronic "reader" on a boom over the freeway reads the information from the truck transponder. It also looks at the safety and compliance record on the database. A display shows the results to the weigh master, including the speed of the vehicle. The weigh master may have the system automatically determine if a truck needs to stop or may override the system. Approximately 1/2–1 mile (800–1,600 m) after passing under the "reader", the truck will pass under another boom which has an electronic unit to send the transponder a signal. If the safety information is acceptable, the truck may receive a green light and can continue without entering the weigh station at all. There are weight detecting devices in the roadway itself. A driver may get a red light. On these occasions, the truck must pull into the weigh station for the normal weigh-in procedure. The most common reason a truck is "redlighted" is a weight problem, or a random check. Each time a truck is randomly pulled in, it is noted in the system whether the driver was compliant or not during the check. This affects how often a truck (or different trucks from the same company) is pulled in. For example, a company which is very compliant with the law will probably only have 5% of its trucks "redlighted."

A 2020 Texas A&M Traffic Institute study commissioned by a trucking safety advocate nonprofit group revealed performance differences between weigh station bypass systems that use transponders, stand-alone hardware devices that uses RFID technology, versus wireless app-based communication technologies that work via a mobile device (smart phone or tablet) in the truck or as part of a truck's on-board telematics. The transponders were more accurate in conditions of slow and heavy traffic when there was little space between trucks; the wireless solutions performed best in lighter traffic.

== Canada ==
=== British Columbia ===
Weigh stations (aka "scales") are usually on the right-hand side of the travelled highway, but median scales are appearing (as of 2005) on divided highways, often combined with "weigh-in-motion" technology.

A median scale is placed between the opposing lanes of traffic, necessitating heavy vehicles exiting from the left lane (rather than the right) and re-entering traffic from the left, potentially at a lower speed than the normal "free-flow" traffic typically expected in the left (often thought of as "fast") lane.

"Weigh-in-motion" technology allows heavy vehicles that do not exceed limits of weight (and size) to pass the scale, thus improving both freight and weigh scale operation efficiency.

=== Alberta ===
In Alberta, scales can be on either on the roadside, on the median or off the highway. Flashing lights inform drivers as to whether the scale is operational. Occasionally, the lights may be operational in only one direction.

Alberta scales are all of the 'weigh-in-motion' type, and vehicles are not required to stop; they merely have to slow to 10 km/h (6 mph).

In Alberta, all government scales are available for the public to use as 'self-weigh' sites. When scales are ‘closed’, drivers can still check their axle weights without enforcement officials being involved.

=== Northwest Territories ===
The government of the Northwest Territories operates only one scale. It is situated in the townsite of Enterprise, 83 km (52 mi) north of the territory's border with Alberta. It issues permits for vehicles from other jurisdictions, weighs vehicles and enforces hours of service legislation.

== Taiwan ==
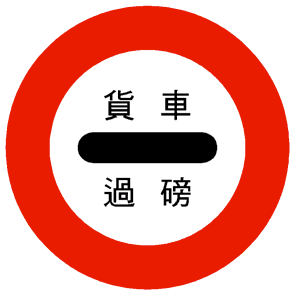
A weigh station sign in Taiwan with Chinese text reading: "trucks are to be weighed"

In Taiwan, weigh stations (Chinese: 地磅站) are located on major highways, especially at all toll booths on freeways. Advanced signs tell that trucks must enter the weigh stations when the attached lights are flashing, usually when tolls are collected.

Weighing procedures vary according to national highway designs. For example, National Highway 1 was built with an older design, which means that all truckers traversing it must weigh their trucks at its older scales. Weigh stations along the National Highway 3 have weigh-in-motion scales at 7 central and southern toll stations, but northern stations at Cidu, Shulin, and Longtan have traditional scales where trucks must stop.

The Taiwan Area National Freeway Bureau applies for periodical inspections of truck scales every three months. Truckers entering a weigh-in-motion scale are advised not to accelerate or decelerate suddenly, or they may be required to be weighed again.

== Automatic weigh stations ==
By using sensors embedded in the road surfaces, combined with cameras that can recognize licence plates, vehicles can be weighed without the need to stop. This system, known as weigh in motion, is used mainly in Europe.

== See also ==
- Commercial Vehicle Inspection
