= Thorsten Heins =

German-Canadian businessman

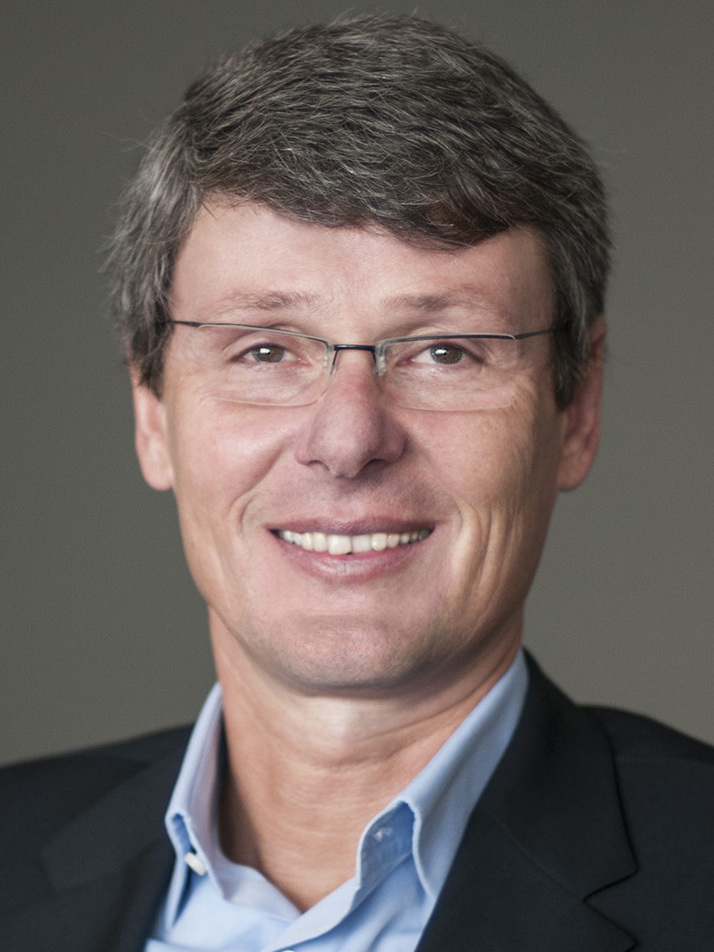
- Heins in 2013
- Born: 29 December 1957 (age 68); Gifhorn, West Germany
- Education: University of Hannover
- Occupation: Technology executive
- Employer(s): Siemens; BlackBerry; Powermat Technologies

Thorsten Heins (born 29 December 1957) is a German-Canadian businessman and the former chief executive officer (CEO) of BlackBerry. He stepped down as CEO of BlackBerry and was replaced by John Chen on November 4, 2013. Heins later was the CEO of Powermat Technologies.

== Education and early life ==
Heins was born in Gifhorn, Germany in 1957. He has a graduate diploma in science and physics from the University of Hannover.

== Career ==
Heins has worked at Siemens, BlackBerry, Powermat Technologies and in public service.

=== Siemens ===
Heins spent 23 years working at Siemens. He worked in several positions related to wireless technology including the chief technology officer of Siemens' communications division and several general management roles in hardware and software.

=== BlackBerry ===
Heins joined Research In Motion (now BlackBerry) in 2007. He rose through the ranks starting as senior vice president of BlackBerry's handheld unit; chief operating officer for product engineering, and finally chief operating officer for product and sales in July 2011. In January 2012, Heins was named to succeed co-CEOs Jim Balsillie and Mike Lazaridis as president and CEO. During his time as CEO, the company continued to struggle in a rapidly changing market. Heins was responsible for BlackBerry's development of the BlackBerry 10 line of consumer and enterprise devices. In 2012, Heins was named Cantech Letter's 2012 TSX Executive of the Year and ranked a year later as third on a list of the worst CEOs of 2013.

Heins was replaced by John Chen, a veteran Silicon Valley executive, during a November 2013 management shakeup and left the company with a $13.8 million severance. Prem Watsa, the board member who recruited John Chen said, "Thorsten did a very good job given the hand that he was dealt, but resigned because you can’t have two people being in charge. He said to me, ‘It’s very appropriate for me to resign. I like John Chen, but I’m a CEO and there is one person in charge.’"

=== Powermat ===
After leaving BlackBerry in 2013, Heins went on to become the chairman and CEO of Powermat Technologies. During Heins' tenure Powermat secured an agreement from Samsung to incorporate its wireless charging technology into future smartphones.

Heins found himself in the middle of a battle between two factions on Powermat's board. Since October 2015, he and some board members were the target of a lawsuit by other Powermat board members led by founder Ran Poliakane for allegedly running the company without an approved budget. Investors like Goldman Sachs and Hudson Clean Energy backed Heins. Heins and other board members, constituting a majority of the directors, countersued. Heins resigned from Powermat in July 2016. Heins' resignation helped settle the lawsuits and allowed for new investment from several important shareholders. Heins had earlier threatened to leave due to what he called a hostile work environment.

=== Public service ===
As of 2012, Heins was on the board of the German Canadian Chamber of Industry and Commerce in Toronto. As of 2016, Heins is on the University of Waterloo's board of governors.

== Personal life ==
Heins has a daughter and a son with his wife, Petra.

Business positions
Preceded by Jim Balsillie/Mike Lazaridis (co-chairs)	BlackBerry CEO; 2012-2013	Succeeded by John S. Chen
