= James Skippen =

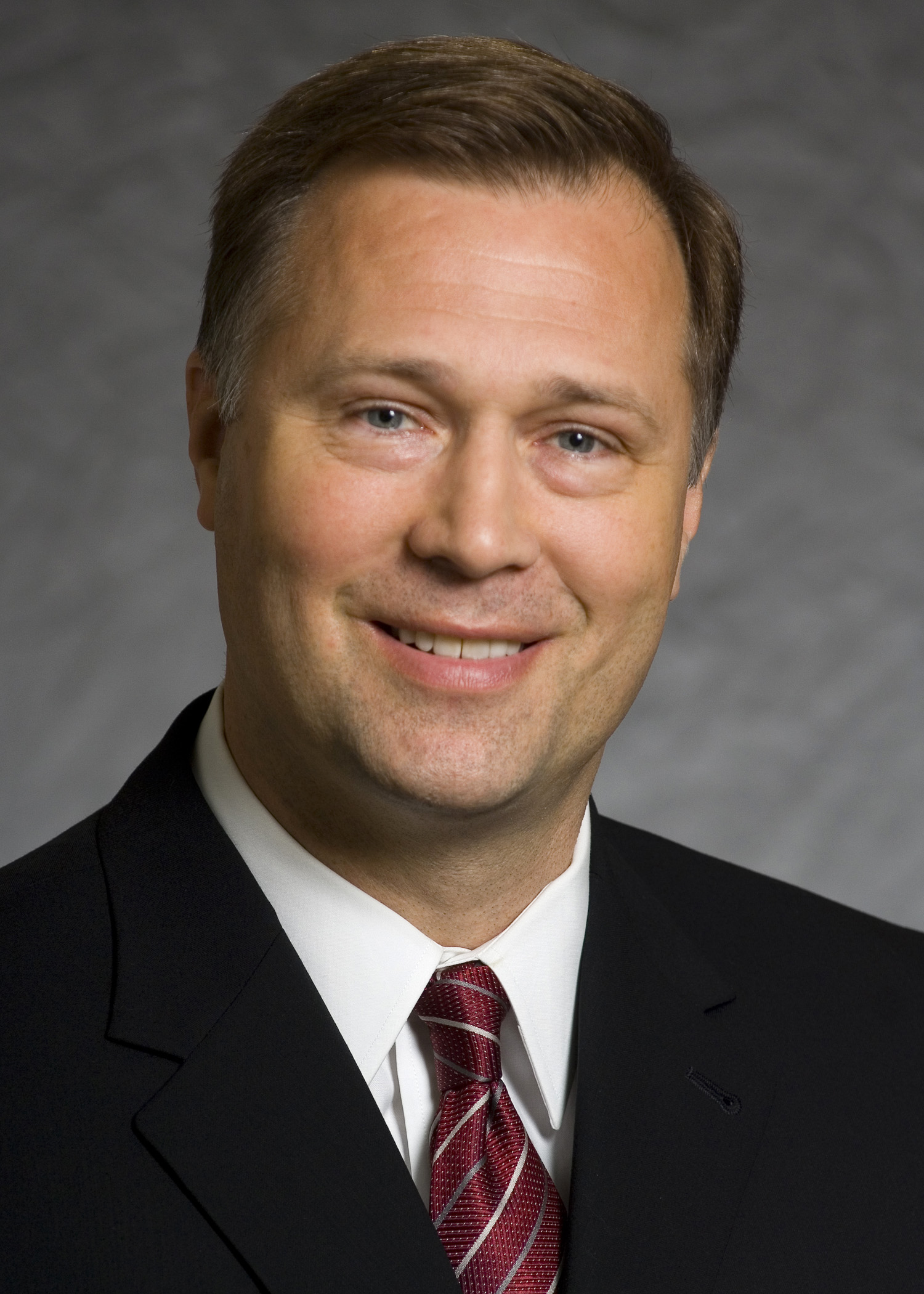
- Skippen in 2006
- Born: 1962 (age 63–64); Ottawa, Canada
- Other name: Jim Skippen
- Education: University of Ottawa
- Occupations: Business executive, lawyer
- Known for: Chief executive officer of WiLAN, executive chairman of Quarterhill
- Children: 2

James "Jim" Skippen is a Canadian business executive and lawyer who is vice chairman of Quarterhill's board of directors, and former president and CEO of Canadian patent monetization firm, WiLAN. Skippen has over two decades of experience in intellectual property and patent licensing.

Since 2006, Skippen's leadership at WiLAN has been credited in helping reshape the firm's focus from technology research and development to patent licensing monetization.

== Early life and education ==
James Skippen was born and grew up in Ottawa, Canada. He attended university at University of Ottawa in the Faculty of Administration, focusing on computer science and business.

After his studies at the University of Ottawa in the Faculty of Administration, Skippen chose to study law, attending law school at the University of Ottawa in 1983. Skippen became interested in focusing on technology law while studying at the university.

== Legal career ==
After completing his studies at the University of Ottawa, Skippen practiced law, first as an associate of Fraser Mann, a technology transfer specialist. Skippen then practiced at one of Canada's largest law firms, Borden Ladner Gervais, then called Borden & Elliott. Skippen worked in the computer and technology law division at Borden & Elliott. Skippen's responsibilities included executing patent and technology transfers and completing corporate legal work for various technology companies.

Skippen entered Borden & Elliott as an associate and worked his way up to partner.

== Business career ==
=== Conversant Intellectual Property Management (formerly Mosaid) ===
In 1996, after roughly a decade of working as a commercial lawyer in private practice, Skippen joined Mosaid Technologies Inc. Skippen held a number of titles at Mosaid, with the last one being the company's senior vice president of patent licensing and general counsel. At the time of Skippen's arrival at Mosaid, the Ottawa-based firm was a technology company working in various forms of computer memory technology.

Prior to Skippen joining the company, Mosaid had begun licensing its computer memory patents to third parties. As senior vice president of patent licensing and general counsel, Skippen was in charge of expanding Mosaid's efforts in licensing its technology. However, as Skippen has described, Mosaid was something of a "conglomerate", a company operating a newly formed patent licensing division, as well as two other older product based divisions. These two product based divisions had formed Mosaid's core business for over two decades with the patent business being a relatively newer business.

Early on in his ten-year tenure with Mosaid, Skippen had a "realization" that enforcing patented technology could be a lucrative business venture. As his time with Mosaid continued, Skippen became increasingly convinced that licensing technology patents and protecting against infringement of these patents should be Mosaid's core business, not developing and marketing new technologies. It was a point of view made stronger as Skippen saw that an increasing portion of Mosaid's roughly $60 million in annual revenues was being generated by the patent division's royalty deals.

In 2005, approximately half a year before making a significant career change, Skippen had a chance to review the patent portfolio of a Calgary-based technology firm called WiLAN. Skippen saw the value in WiLAN's patent portfolio and had Mosaid try to purchase the portfolio. The purchase attempt was unsuccessful, but Skippen left an indelible impression on WiLAN's board of directors, and the attempt would prove significant in other ways.

=== Move to WiLAN ===
Since its founding in 1992 until 2006, WiLAN was a technology research and development company based in Calgary that owned a handful of valuable wiFI and wMAX wireless patents. However, since the dot com bust in 2000, WiLAN had experienced deteriorating success as a company. By 2006, WiLAN had only a handful of employees left on its staff, and the company's leadership was looking for a more successful business model. In 2006, WiLAN's leadership decided that it would transform the company into a "pure play" patent licensing company.

Recalling the impression Skippen left with WiLAN's directors and knowing Skippen's experience in patent licensing, WiLAN approached Skippen with an offer to lead the company and help WiLAN transform into a significant player in the growing patent licensing business.

On June 17, 2006, Skippen formally became WiLAN's new chief executive officer. Given how uncertain WiLAN's future was as a company, Skippen remarked that when he accepted the position as CEO, he told his wife that "in six months [he] could be presiding over a bankruptcy". But, if it worked out, it would be good for the family.

Along with accepting the new position, Skippen requested that WiLAN move its headquarters from Calgary to Ottawa, in part to take advantage of the more robust technology and intellectual property talent in Ottawa.

Nearly a week after becoming WiLAN's CEO, Skippen traveled to Helsinki, Finland to meet with the Nokia Corporation and ask Nokia to complete a licence to use WiLAN's portfolio of wireless technology patents.

Five months after meeting with Nokia, Skippen and WiLAN signed a $49.2-million licensing deal with Nokia. It was a deal that achieved a number of goals. Most importantly, successfully signing a patent agreement with a company as large as Nokia showed investors and those in the technology industry that WiLAN had the clout to enforce its patents.

In December 2006, Skippen led in raising additional cash for WiLAN by selling 6.7 million common shares in the company. Strategically, this was a move that would provide WiLAN more leverage to enforce its portfolio of patents.

=== Transforming WiLAN ===
By January 2007, Skippen had completed talks with 10 corporations about setting up royalty agreements.

Aided by the Nokia deal, by January 2007, Skippen had led WiLAN through a recovery and the company had become the second most valuable tech firm in Ottawa.

Also in 2007, Skippen and his senior management team increasingly focused on sourcing new technology patents to purchase as a way to expand WiLAN's new patent monetization efforts.

By 2008, Skippen and WiLAN had launched lawsuits against 22 name-brand technology companies, including Apple, Dell, and Hewlett-Packard, in defense of WiLAN's patents. Skippen would defend WiLAN's ongoing use of litigation to protect its patents and has been quoted in saying that WiLAN is "seeking fair compensation for [its] investment in research and development."

Besides leading WiLAN in increasing patent litigations, Skippen also led in expanding WiLAN's portfolio of patents. In 2007, WiLAN owned and licensed out approximately 150 patents. By 2012, Skippen had led in expanding WiLAN's portfolio to include more than 3,000 technology patents. Today, WiLAN controls approximately 15,000 patents.

=== Postponing retirement from WiLAN ===
In June 2015, Skippen announced that he was retiring as chief executive of WiLAN to "spend more time with my family and to focus on completing some other projects".

In November that year, WiLAN began a company-wide restructuring to more closely focus on patent monetization and licensing patent portfolios owned and developed by other companies. As part of WiLAN's restructuring, it was announced that Skippen would remain as WiLAN's CEO for at least another three years. The company restructuring and announcement of Skippen's retirement delay was treated positively from capital analysts like Paradigm.

Skippen is president and chief executive officer of WiLAN. In 2017, Skippen was named executive chairman of Quarterhill, a company formed from WiLAN in June of that year and which invests in companies operating in the industrial Internet of Things.

Skippen will retire from his positions as Executive Chairman of Quarterhill and interim CEO of WiLAN in August 2018.

== Defending patent rights ==
Over the years, Skippen has defended many times in the media a company's right to defend the patented technology it owns and defend this technology, if need be, through litigation. Skippen has stated his belief that purchasing patents or transferring the ownership of patents from one party to another should not discount an entity's ability to defend patent infringement. Skippen has also stated that a patent system and a company or individual's right to defend its intellectual property spurs innovation and encourages small inventors.

== Contributions to other organizations ==
From 2005 to 2011, Skippen was a board member of Icron Technologies Inc., assisting the tech company in its Intellectual Property licensing program. Skippen is a member of the Canadian Advanced Technology Alliance (CATAAlliance). Skippen is a member of the Licensing Executives Society and is also a member of the Executive for the Ottawa Technology Law Group. Skippen is also a former chairman of the Toronto Computer Lawyers Group.

Skippen is a former vice-chairman and director of the Canadian Diabetes Association.

== Recognition ==
Over the years, Skippen has been the recipient of a number of awards. In 2001, Skippen was a recipient of a Forty Under 40 Award by the Ottawa Business Journal. In 2011, Skippen was named the Canadian Tech Stock Executive of the Year by Cantech Letter.

== Personal life ==
Skippen lives in Ottawa, Canada. Skippen is married and has two children.
