= NORPASS =

Nonprofit organization

NORPASS coverage map. The blue states/provinces represent NORPASS members and partners.

NORPASS (North American Preclearance and Safety System) is a not-for-profit organization formed from a partnership between state agencies and the North American trucking industry. The program issues electronic transponders and provides a weigh station bypassing service for truckers in Alaska, British Columbia, Connecticut, Idaho, Kentucky, North Carolina, New York, Oregon, Quebec, South Dakota, and Washington. Two service centres, operated by the Kentucky Transportation Center at the University of Kentucky and the Washington State Department of Transportation, coordinate efforts of NORPASS.

== Partnership ==
PrePass has partnered with NORPASS in a cooperative agreement between Washington State Department of Transportation (WSDOT), Oregon Department of Transportation (ODOT) Greenlight system, and PrePass Safety Alliance, the provider of PrePass services, allowing the PrePass transponders to be used in the NORPASS system. This has added 44 locations to the PrePass system. There is no extra charge but a customer must submit a signed wavier of the Alliance’s data privacy policy upon registration.

== See also ==
- E-ZPass
- Drivewyze
