= Arthur Bergan =

Canadian engineer

- Born: Arthur Theodore Bergan
- Education: University of Saskatchewan (B.Sc. 1961, M.Sc. 1964); University of California, Berkeley (Ph.D. 1968)
- Awards: Saskatchewan Transportation Hall of Fame (2003); President, Canadian Technical Asphalt Association
- Engineering career
- Discipline: Civil engineering, transportation engineering, soil mechanics
- Practice name: International Road Dynamics (IRD) (Founder & Board Chairman)
- Projects: Weigh-in-Motion (WIM) Scale system Saskatchewan Seatbelt Effectiveness Study (1970s); Transport Canada Transportation Centers of Excellence Network
- Significant design: Northern Saskatchewan Highway Systems (over 500 miles through permafrost/muskeg)

Arthur Theodore Bergan is a Canadian civil engineer and professor. He specializes in transportation engineering. He supervised the construction of highways and the development of Transport Canada's Transportation Centers. He supervised the development of the Weigh-in-Motion Scale, designed to weigh vehicles passing over computer-assisted scales at speeds up to 70 miles per hour.

== Early life ==
Arthur Bergan was born in Assiniboia, Saskatchewan and graduated from high school in 1949. He began working at the provincial Department of Highways in 1951. He attended the University of Saskatchewan, obtaining a bachelor's degree in civil engineering in 1961, a Master of Science in Soil Mechanics from UofS in 1964, and a Ph.D. in Pavement Design for Heavy Loads from the University of California, Berkeley in 1968.

== Career ==
During his career, Bergan supervised the design and construction of highways – many in previously undeveloped regions in north and northeastern Saskatchewan. An estimated 500 miles of Saskatchewan highway were built under his supervision through challenging terrain such as permafrost and muskeg.

In the 1970s, Bergan established the University of Saskatchewan's Transportation Research Centre to conduct research and training in transportation systems, safety, and economics. One of Bergan's first projects was a study of seatbelt effectiveness. In 1978, Saskatchewan became the first province in Canada to legislate the use of seatbelts. Bergan's most important success may be his lead role in improving highway efficiency and safety. In 2003, he was inducted into the Saskatchewan Transportation Hall of Fame.

Bergan was instrumental in establishing a network of transportation centers across Canada, under the mandate of Transport Canada. The network evolved into Canada's lead center of excellence in transportation safety research, with research centers across Canada, including the University of Saskatchewan.

In the late 1970s, Bergan developed a weigh-in-motion scale capable of weighing trucks traveling at highway speeds. This technology led to the formation in 1980 of International Road Dynamics (IRD), a Saskatoon company specializing in weigh-in-motion, commercial vehicle operation enforcement, and intelligent transportation systems. Under Bergan's leadership as board chairman, IRD became an international leader in intelligent transportation systems (ITS).

Bergan authored numerous refereed journal and conference proceedings. He served on college, national, and international professional committees. He was appointed president of the Canadian Technical Asphalt Association, and served as assistant dean of the College of Engineering from 1978 to 1983. He is a member of the Association of Professional Engineers of Saskatchewan and other engineering and transportation associations.
