= Skippen =

Skippen is a surname. Notable people with the surname include:

- James Skippen, Canadian businessman and lawyer
- Kathy Skippen, American politician
