= PrePass =

Intelligent transportation system

PrePass is a North American intelligent transportation system (ITS) used by commercial vehicles for weigh station bypass, electronic toll payment, and regulatory compliance management. The system identifies enrolled vehicles as they approach participating facilities, verifies their safety and credential status, and signals whether they may bypass or must stop for inspection.

PrePass is operated by PrePass Safety Alliance, a 501(c)(3) nonprofit public-private partnership formerly known as HELP Inc. As of 2024, PrePass operates at 550 sites in 44 states.

== History ==
Crescent Project

In the late 1980s, trucking industry representatives and government officials began exploring ways to reduce delays at weigh stations and ports of entry. In 1991, the Crescent Project was launched as a multi-state research initiative to test technologies capable of weighing trucks at highway speeds and allowing compliant vehicles to bypass inspection facilities.

The project involved six U.S. states (Arizona, California, New Mexico, Oregon, Texas, and Washington) along with British Columbia, covering a crescent-shaped corridor from British Columbia south along Interstate 5 through California, then east along Interstate 10 to Texas, with a branch onto Interstate 20. After evaluating several technologies, organizers selected Radio Frequency Identification Detection (RFID).

Early transponders were mounted on front bumpers, where they suffered damage from road debris. They were subsequently relocated to the truck cab interior. The first mainline bypass site opened in May 1993 at the Santa Nella Weigh Station on Interstate 5 in California. By fall 1993, approximately 4,300 vehicles had enrolled.

Formation of HELP Inc

In 1993, several state transportation directors and trucking company executives formed Heavy-Vehicle Electronic License Plate, Inc. (HELP), a 501(c)(3) nonprofit organization. The name referred to the original bumper-mounted transponders. Lockheed Martin was contracted to develop the system.

PrePass was first installed in California in 1995. By 1998, the system was operating at 35 weigh stations across ten states (Arkansas, Arizona, California, Colorado, Mississippi, Montana, Nevada, New Mexico, Texas, and Wyoming) with 850 enrolled companies and transponders in 55,000 trucks.

Later developments

The technology supporting PrePass was operated for nearly 30 years by a succession of contractors, including Lockheed Martin, Xerox, and Conduent. In 2018, the technology operation was spun off as a standalone entity called CVO Holding Company.

In May 2019, HELP Inc. changed its name to PrePass Safety Alliance.

In July 2022, PrePass Safety Alliance acquired CVO Holding Company, consolidating operations and technology under a single organization.

== Products and services ==
Weigh station bypass

The core PrePass Bypass service electronically verifies the safety record, operating credentials, and weight of commercial vehicles as they approach participating weigh stations. Carriers that meet all requirements receive an in-cab signal authorizing them to bypass the facility at highway speed rather than pulling in for manual inspection.

The system requires a vehicle-specific RFID transponder mounted on the interior windshield. As a vehicle approaches an equipped facility, an overhead electronic reader interrogates the transponder and validates the associated data against state safety and credential requirements. Weigh-in-motion (WIM) technology at many locations also checks axle and gross vehicle weight. A second reader closer to the inspection point transmits a green (bypass authorized) or red (stop required) signal to the transponder.

Only carriers with valid operating credentials and an acceptable safety history may enroll. A minimum 5% random pull-in rate applies to all participating vehicles to maintain enforcement integrity; this rate may be adjusted at the direction of state or federal agencies.

PrePass also offers a mobile application, PrePass Mobile App, that extends bypass capability to locations lacking RFID transponder infrastructure. The app uses geolocation and geofencing technology and can operate independently or alongside a physical transponder. It was first announced in October 2017 as PrePass MOTION at the American Trucking Associations Management Conference & Exposition. The app is available for iOS and Android and integrates with electronic logging devices (ELDs) and telematics platforms.

Toll management

PrePass Toll Management provides electronic toll payment services across multiple toll networks in the United States through interoperable transponders accepted by participating toll authorities. Supported networks include E-ZPass, SunPass, FasTrak, ExpressToll, and others. The service processes tolls electronically and deducts charges from the operator’s account.

The toll management platform includes GPS-based verification for cross-referencing vehicle location data with toll transactions, and AI Toll Insights, an analytics component that uses pattern recognition to flag device mismatches, routing anomalies, and billing discrepancies.

Bundled service

PrePass Plus combines weigh station bypass and toll payment into a single platform with consolidated billing and reporting. It supports transponder-only, mobile-only, or hybrid deployment.

Compliance tools

PrePass Compliance offers regulatory products that track and analyze carrier safety scores and inspection history. These include an analytics platform, FleetDrive 360, for driver and vehicle compliance management and, through a partnership with NECS, managed services for fuel and tax recovery, DOT audits, and compliance consulting.

Safety analytics

An analytics module, INFORM Safety, included with bypass services, consolidates bypass and inspection data to display trends across metrics such as compliance, safety, accountability (CSA) exposure, speeding, hours of service, and other categories. The module is designed for use in driver coaching and compliance reporting.

== Enrollment ==
To enroll, a carrier submits an application and copies of standard operating credentials such as vehicle registration cards and International Fuel Tax Agreement (IFTA) licenses. The service operates on a monthly subscription model with no charges for transponders, application or enrollment fees, or long-term contracts. A 2007 Federal Motor Carrier Safety Administration study estimated that each weigh station bypass saves approximately $8.68 in time and fuel costs.

== Inspection Selection System ==
The determination of whether a vehicle receives a bypass signal is governed by the Inspection Selection System (ISS), which draws on the FMCSA Safety Status Measurement System (SafeStat). SafeStat scores are derived from the Compliance, Safety, and Accountability (CSA) program’s seven Behavior Analysis and Safety Improvement Categories (BASICs), compiled through the Motor Carrier Management Information System (MCMIS).

The ISS assigns an inspection value on a 1–100 scale:

Inspection Selection System
Recommendation	ISS Inspection Value
Inspection warranted	75-100
Optional	50-74
Pass	1-49

== Partnerships and interoperability ==
PrePass integrates with third-party fleet management and telematics platforms, including Geotab, Motive, Samsara, Platform Science, Omnitracs, and Pedigree Technologies.

Through a cooperative agreement formalized in 2018, PrePass transponders are accepted by the NORPASS system, adding locations in Washington, Alaska, Connecticut, Idaho, New York, and South Dakota. The agreement involved the Washington State Department of Transportation (WSDOT), the Oregon Department of Transportation (ODOT) Green Light system, and HELP Inc.

A separate agreement announced in December 2017 allows PrePass transponders to be enrolled in Oregon’s Green Light weigh station bypass program. These interoperability features carry no additional charge, though customers must sign a waiver of HELP’s data privacy policy upon registration.

== Governance ==
PrePass Safety Alliance is governed by a board of directors that includes representatives from state transportation agencies, law enforcement agencies, and trucking industry organizations. This structure was established to balance safety enforcement priorities with industry operational interests.

== See also ==
- PrePass Safety Alliance
- PrePass
