= California Manual on Uniform Traffic Control Devices =

State traffic control manual of California Department of Transportation

- The 2014 edition, the latest published to date
- Authors: California Department of Transportation
- Language: English
- Publisher: California Department of Transportation
- Publication date: 2006; 20 years ago
- Publication place: United States
- Pages: 1,435
- OCLC: 779857879
- Text: California Manual on Uniform Traffic Control Devices online
- Website: dot.ca.gov/programs/safety-programs/camutcd/

The California Manual on Uniform Traffic Control Devices (abbreviated CA MUTCD) is the standard for traffic signs, road surface markings, and traffic signals in the U.S. state of California. It is developed by the California Department of Transportation (Caltrans) Division of Safety Programs "in substantial conformance to" the national Manual on Uniform Traffic Control Devices developed by the Federal Highway Administration. The first edition of the CA MUTCD was published in 2006, replacing an earlier supplement to the national MUTCD. The most recent edition was published in 2014, incorporating the 2009 edition of the national MUTCD. California is one of ten states that publish their own editions of the MUTCD. The CA MUTCD defines the content and placement of traffic signs. Design specifications are detailed on a section of the Caltrans website that is based on the national Standard Highway Signs and Markings (SHSM) document.

== History ==
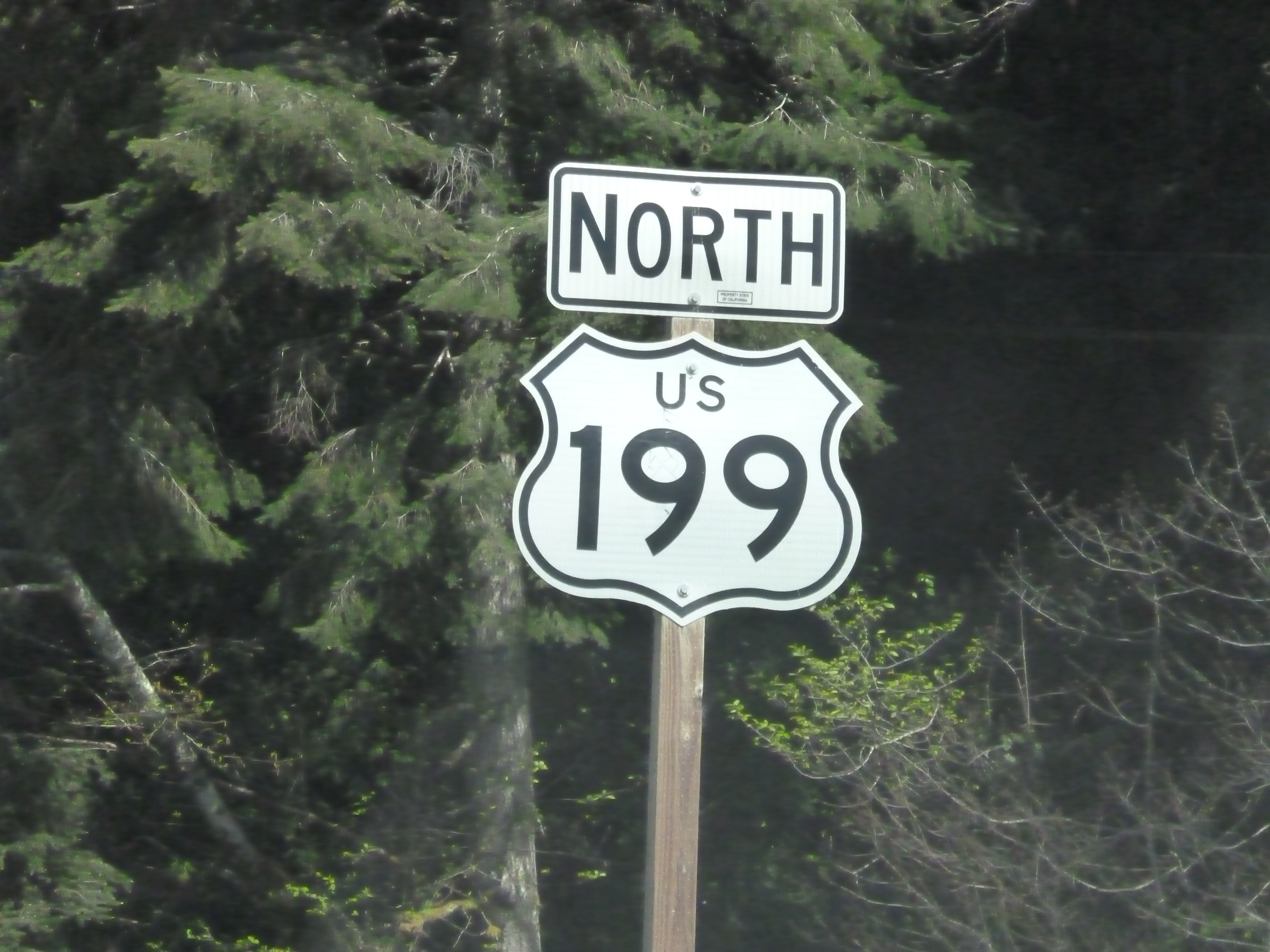
California is the only state that retains the nonrectangular U.S. Route shield, which was used nationally until 1961.

In 1952, the California Department of Public Works Division of Highways published a Planning Manual of Instructions. A traffic manual was added to the planning manual in 1955.

In 1969, the California State Legislature deleted all the provisions of the California Vehicle Code that explicitly specified standards for traffic control devices, making the Division of Highways the sole agency responsible for enacting traffic standards in the state in consultation with the California Traffic Control Devices Committee.

In 1972, the traffic manual became a standalone document, titled simply Traffic Manual. A metric version was published in 1996 by the then-renamed Department of Transportation's Division of Traffic Operations.

The iconic "immigration sign" was coded as W54 in the 1990s.

In 2000, Caltrans and the California Traffic Control Devices Committee undertook an effort to reconcile the Traffic Manual with the national MUTCD. In 2004, these efforts resulted in the adoption of the 2003 edition of the national MUTCD along with a California supplement, which replaced various chapters of the 1996 Traffic Manual pertaining to traffic signs and signals.

In 2006, Caltrans once again published its own standard as the CA MUTCD to incorporate the supplement's guidance into the main text of the standard. Subsequent editions were published in 2010, 2012, and 2014. Caltrans made nearly annual revisions to the document from then through at least 2023.

== Legal authority ==
California Vehicle Code section 21400 provides for Caltrans to adopt a state-specific edition of the MUTCD. Section 21401 legally requires all traffic control devices on streets and highways to conform to these standards. Therefore, the manual is used by state, county, and municipal highway departments, as well as by private construction firms, to ensure that the traffic control devices they use conform to the state standard. Some parts of the national MUTCD have not been incorporated into the CA MUTCD. Where there is a conflict between the two standards, the CA MUTCD takes precedence within California. Several Caltrans-specific signs also appear in the California Driver Handbook, the driver's education handbook published by the California Department of Motor Vehicles in 13 languages.

== Development ==
The CA MUTCD is developed by Caltrans in consultation with the California Traffic Control Devices Committee (CTCDC) and other stakeholder agencies. The CTCDC is the successor to the California State Sign Committee, which was originally responsible for highway signage from 1933 to 1947. The ten-member committee consists of representatives designated by Caltrans, the League of California Cities, the County Engineers Association of California, the Automobile Club of Southern California, AAA Northern California, Nevada & Utah, and the California Highway Patrol.

== Contents ==
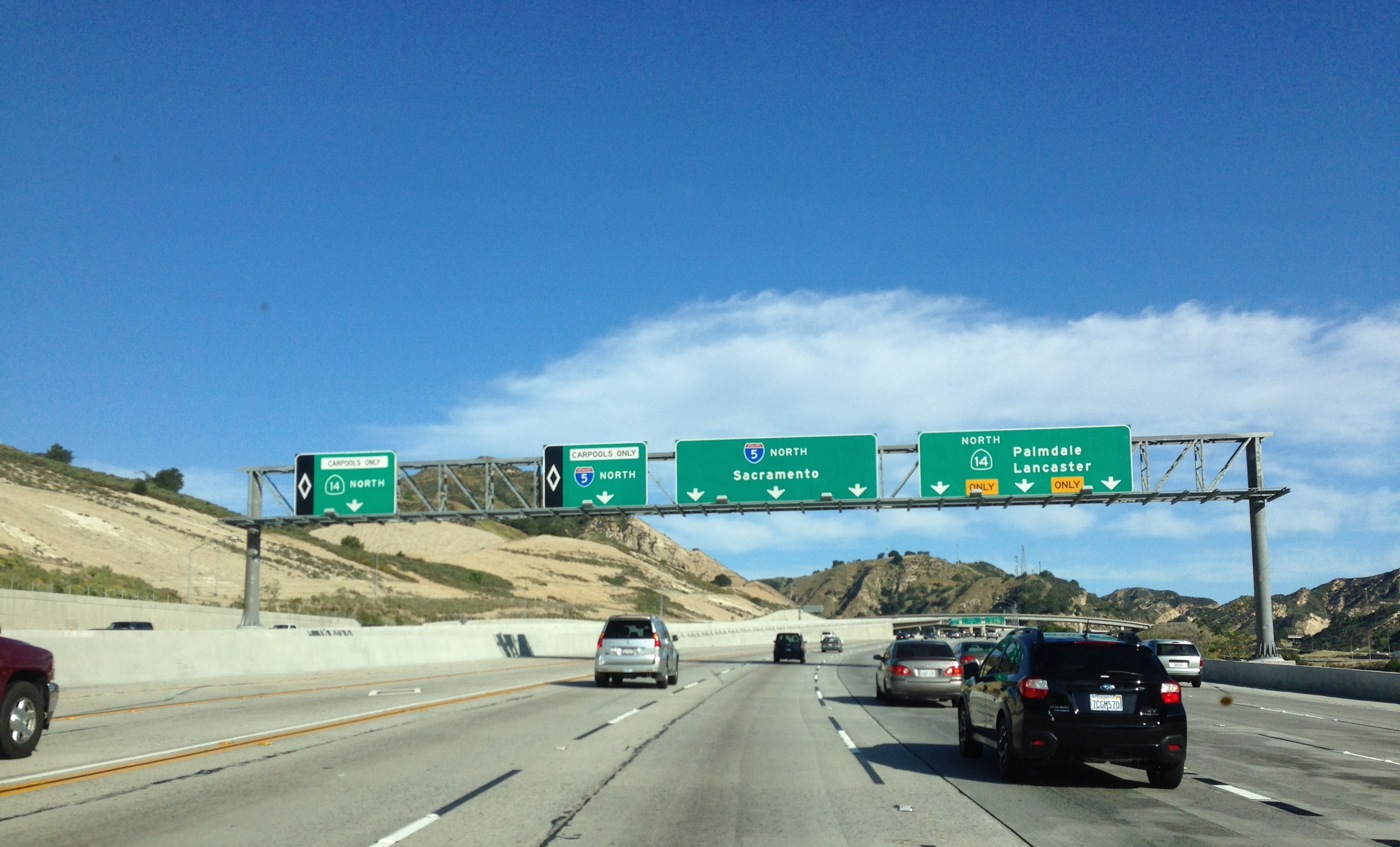
In California, guide signs are laid out horizontally with a consistent height. Pull-through signs are used instead of diagrammatic signs.

The CA MUTCD and sign specifications are organized similarly to the MUTCD and SHSM, respectively. Each of the California sign specifications is assigned an alphanumeric designation and organized according to the same series found in the SHSM. The sign designation for a state-specific sign includes a "(CA)" after the sign number. The CA MUTCD also defines some state-specific series:

- Series G: California Guide
- Series SG: California Special Guide
- Series S: California Special Information
- Series SC: California Special Temporary Traffic Control
- Series SR: California Special Regulation
- Series SW: California Special Warning
Some common signs unique to the CA MUTCD

Welcome To California
G10B(CA)

Inventory Marker
G11-4.1(CA)

Inventory Marker
G11-6(CA)

Historical Landmark
G13-1(CA)

Point of Historical Interest
G15(CA)

Pull-Through
G24-6(CA)

State Route Marker
G28-2(CA)

Scenic Route
G30(CA)

Compressed Natural Gas
G66-22A(CA)

STAA Truck Terminal Access
G66-56(CA)

Call Box
SG25(CA)

California Welcome Center X Miles
SG47A(CA)

Adopt-A-Highway
S32(CA)

Highway Patrol Parking Only
S34(CA)

No Step
PS-123(CA)

Trucks, 3 Axles or More 55 Maximum
R6-3(CA)

No Right Turn on Red
R13A(CA)

Right (Left) Lane Freeway Only
R18B(CA)

No Trucks Variable Message
R20-1(CA)

Truck Length Limit
R20H(CA)

Loading Only 7AM to 6PM Except Sunday 30 Minute Limit with Double Arrow
R25A(CA)

No Parking Any Time
R26(CA)

Tow-Away No Parking
R26K(CA)

No Stopping/No Parking Specific Hours
R29(CA)

No Stopping/Parking Specific Hours
R31(S)(CA)

Commercial Vehicle Weight Exclusion
R36(CA)

$1000 Fine for Littering
R47(CA)

Speed Enforced by Radar
R48(CA)

No Ped Crossing, Use Crosswalk
R49(CA)

Autos With Trailers – Trucks – Prohibited
R53D(CA)

Intersection Lane Control
R73-3(CA)

Chains Required
R76(CA)

Bike Lane
R81(CA)

Accessible Parking Only Minimum Fine $250
R99C(CA)

Disabled Tow-Away
R100B(CA)

School Speed Limit Assembly C (CA)
SR4-1(CA)

Trucks Not Given Bypass Signal Must Enter Open Scales
SR17(CA)

HOV Violation $___ Minimum Fine
SR50-2(CA)

Traffic Signal Photo Enforced
SR56(CA)

Red Light Violation $____ Minimum Fine
SR58(CA)

Right Lane Buses Taxis Only 6AM–9PM Mon–Fri
SR60-3(CA)

Rock Slide Area
W50-1(CA)

Light Rail Transit (Trolley) Crossing
W82(CA)

Migrating Bears
SW59(CA)

Watch for Stopped Vehicles
SW60(CA)
