= WiLAN =

Wi-LAN Inc.
- Type: Subsidiary
- Industry: Patent monetization
- Founded: 1992
- Founder: Hatim Zaghloul; Michel Fattouche
- Headquarters: Ottawa, Ontario, Canada
- Area served: Worldwide
- Key people: Andrew Parolin, CEO and President
- Products: Bluetooth, LTE, WiMAX, WiFi, CDMA, DOCSIS
- Parent: Quarterhill Inc.
- Website: wilan.com

WiLAN is a technology development and intellectual property licensing company with headquarters in Ottawa, Ontario, Canada. In addition to collaborating with other patent portfolio owners, WiLan licenses its own portfolio of patents. Modern wireless communication methods are continuously researched and developed by WiLAN Labs. A publicly traded company on the Toronto Stock Exchange, Quarterhill Inc.'s principal subsidiary is WiLAN.

== History ==
In 1992, Hatim Zaghloul and Michel Fattouche co-founded WiLAN after they developed together the Wideband Orthogonal Frequency Division Multiplexing (WOFDM), and Multi-code Direct-sequence Spread Spectrum (MCDSSS). Through WiLAN's efforts, the Federal Communications Commission (FCC) has allowed OFDM technology over the 2.4 GHz unlicensed ISM band for the Institute of Electrical and Electronics Engineers (IEEE) 802.11 standards. MC-DSSS (MultiCode-Direct-sequence Spread Spectrum) is central to high speed CDMA applications, the main technology currently used by many cellphone networks.

In March 1998, WiLAN had its initial public offering.

In November 1999, WiLAN and Philips invited companies to attend a meeting to form an alliance to promote the OFDM technology and its applications. WiLAN was a founding member of the WiMAX Forum together with Ensemble, CossSpan, Harris, and Nokia.

From its founding in 1992 to 2000, WiLAN had success as interest and investment in the tech industry grew. However, in 2000, when the world's first tech bubble collapsed, WiLAN's fortunes changed. At the start of 2000, WiLAN's share price was at $80. By the end of that year, WiLAN's share price had dropped by 90 per cent.

== Refocusing business in 2006 ==
In 2006, WiLAN changed their business model. Instead of focusing on research and development and trying to commercialize its patent technology, WiLAN divested its various technology product lines to refocus its business on licensing intellectual property and patent rights.

WiLAN's company goals would center around licensing its own technology patents to third-party companies, as well as licensing patents it had acquired.

In line with WiLAN's refocus on patent licensing, in late 2005 the company brought in Jim Skippen, who had previous experience in licensing technology from working at Mosaid as a senior vice president of patent licensing and general counsel.

WiLAN also moved from its original location in Calgary, Alberta, Canada to Ottawa, where the company has remained since. That same year, WiLAN acquired Tri-Vision, a company that developed a key ingredient in the V-Chip technology. WiLAN also signed a $50 million license deal with Nokia, allowing Nokia to use WiLAN's wireless patents.

By 2012, WiLAN owned or controlled more than 3,000 patents.

In 2015, WiLAN announced that it had gained a new portfolio of 7,000 patents in technology related to access memory, flash memory, semiconductor manufacturing, and other technologies. Labeled the "Qimonda portfolio", in June 2015, WiLAN announced it had signed a multi-year licensing agreement with Samsung, allowing Samsung to use technology in WiLAN's new Qimonda portfolio.

== Restructuring in 2015 ==
In late 2015, WiLAN announced that, beginning in October 2015, it would undergo a significant company restructuring. As part of this restructuring, WiLAN announced that it would spin off its research and development unit and cut its dividend to shareholders. The restructuring would affect 30 per cent of WiLAN's workforce. The company would also focus on licensing patent portfolios owned by other companies and helping companies monetize their patents.

In April 2017, WiLAN acquired International Road Dynamics, a Saskatoon-based road traffic management system engineering company, for $63.5 million. In May 2017, they acquired VIZIYA, a software services provider, for $40 million. The acquisition of VIZAYA was part of a broader restructuring at WiLan from a patent licensing company to a more diversified technology holding company. As part of the restructuring, a new holding company, Quarterhill Inc., was created, which contains WiLan Inc., International Road Dynamics, and VIZIYA as subsidiaries.

== Products ==
1. Hopper, DS-SSSS modem, 19.2-115kbit/s, 902-926 MHz unlicensed band – 1993–1999.
2. Hopper Plus, AWE, DS-SSSS CSK modem, up to 1Mbit/s, 2.4 GHz and 5.7 GHz unlicensed bands – 1994–2000.
3. BWS, Libra Product Lines, OFDM modem, up to 16Mbit/s, 2.4 GHz – 1999–2006.
4. Semiconductors

== Awards ==
1. 2004 Calgary Export Achievement Award for Collaborative Partnerships by the Haskayne School of Management.
2. Export Achievement Award from Alberta Venture Magazine in 2004
3. Wireless Communications Association International "Wemmie" Award in 2003. The award was for the Banco Del Pichincha non-line-of-sight network in Ecuador.
4. Alberta Professional Engineers, Geologists and Geophysicists Association 2002 APEGGA Achievement Award for substantial technological progress.
5. 1999 recipient of the CATA Alliance Award of Distinction for Emerging Technology.
6. 1998 ASTECH Award for "Small Business"
7. One of four finalists for the 1997 ASTECH Award for "Small Business"
8. 1993 Electronic Industries Association of Alberta (EIAA) "Award for best technology".
9. Wireless Communications Association (WCA) International "Wemmie" in the "Most Effective Educational Program" category for the Northern Lights School Division network in Northern Alberta.

== See also ==
- Patent
- Patent Troll
- Intellectual property
