= Jim Balsillie =

Canadian businessman (born 1961)

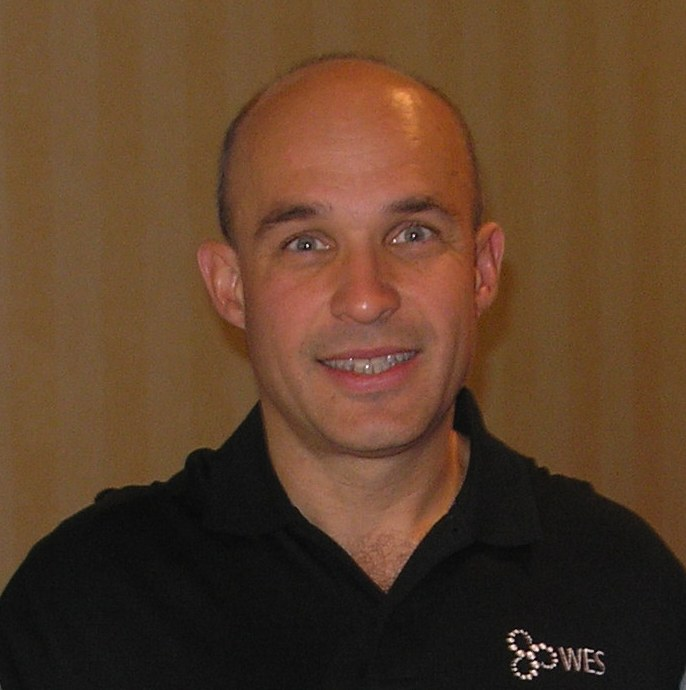
- Balsillie in 2008
- Born: James Laurence Balsillie; February 3, 1961 (age 65); Seaforth, Ontario, Canada
- Education: University of Toronto (BComm); Harvard University (MBA); Wilfrid Laurier University (PhD)

James Laurence Balsillie (born February 3, 1961) is a Canadian businessman and philanthropist. He is the former chair and co-chief executive officer of the Canadian technology company Research In Motion (BlackBerry), which at its 2011 peak made US$19.9 billion in annual sales.

Since leaving Blackberry in 2012, Balsillie has taken up a number of roles in Canadian business and society. He is the founder of the Balsillie School of International Affairs at the University of Waterloo, the Centre for International Governance and Innovation (CIGI) think tank, and serves as chair of the Canadian Council of Innovators.

== Early life and education ==
Jim Balsillie was born in 1961 in Seaforth, Ontario, to Raymond Balsillie, an electronics technician at Ontario Hydro, and Laurel Balsillie. The family moved to Peterborough when Jim was five years old. He received a BComm degree from Trinity College at the University of Toronto in 1984, where he was also a member of the Zeta Psi fraternity. He earned an MBA from Harvard Business School in 1989. He also received an honorary PhD from Wilfrid Laurier University.

== Career ==
=== Early career ===
After graduating from Harvard Business School, Balsillie was an executive vice-president and chief financial officer of technology for Cambridge, Ontario-based design and construction services company Sutherland-Schultz. He left that position in 1992 when Sutherland-Schultz was sold to the Vollmer Group.

=== Research In Motion ===
In 1992, after initially making overtures to buy the company, Balsillie invested CA$125,000 in Research In Motion (RIM) and joined as co-CEO with founder Mike Lazaridis. The company had fewer than ten employees and would eventually become the "international powerhouse" called BlackBerry Limited, with as many as 28,000 employees. Both men prospered from the partnership: Lazaridis looked after the technological side and Balsillie looked after the sales, business and accounting side.

Canadian newspaper The Globe and Mail contended that Balsillie infused RIM with an "institutional arrogance" as he remade the landscape of the smartphone industry. He was "feared and respected" by senior managers within his hierarchy. The twin-CEO structure of Lazaridis and Balsillie eventually became cumbersome and inhibited their competition with the Apple iPhone and Google's Android devices.

On March 5, 2007, Balsillie resigned his role as chairman of RIM as the firm reported over US$250 million in past stock option accounting errors after an extensive review. He retained his roles as co-chief executive and director. On May 17, 2007, RIM announced that "Consistent with current best practices in corporate governance, the roles of Chairman and CEO have been separated."

In June 2007, Apple brought its first touchscreen smartphone to the market. BlackBerry would not have a touch-screen smartphone until after Balsillie's departure from the executive suite.

In February 2009, as part of the penalties and sanctions approved by the Ontario Securities Commission (OSC) in settling the improper option practices, which the OSC called a "fundamental failure of governance", Balsillie was forced to resign as a director of RIM. In May 2010, almost immediately after the OSC sanctions expired, Balsillie was reappointed to the board, in spite of strong shareholder objections, and notwithstanding RIM's earlier public representations that the roles of chairman and CEO were separated.

BlackBerry OS lost its market dominance to Google's Android technology in 2010, from a peak of over 22% of the operating system market in 2009. BlackBerry OS has not received an official update since March 2022.

At the end of 2011, Balsillie was the third largest shareholder of the company, holding 5.1% of the outstanding shares. But that June, BlackBerry cut 2,000 employees, or 11% of its global workforce, and the joint CEOs reduced their pay to $1. The share value had tumbled from $137.41 in 2008 to $14.80 at the end of 2011. By then, the iPhone from Apple had launched and cornered the mobile apps market, and some investors called for resignations from the executive suite.

On January 22, 2012, Balsillie and co-CEO Mike Lazaridis resigned from their positions and were replaced by RIM Chief Operating Officer Thorsten Heins. Two months later, on March 29, 2012, RIM announced that Balsillie would be stepping down from the board of directors. He resigned from the Board due to strategic differences with Heins, who abandoned the licensing strategy that Balsillie was pursuing. One publication blamed "managerial gridlock" and deteriorating product quality for BlackBerry's fall from grace in the years from 2010 to 2013 and beyond. The decline was steep for RIM: in the span of five years, the company had gone from Canada's most valuable property, surpassing even the biggest bank, to a tenth of its former value.

Balsillie commercialised 44,000 patents during his career at RIM, and claims he is "the largest commercial IP protagonist in the history of [Canada]."

=== Failed NHL ownership bids ===
Balsillie was involved in at least three attempts to buy a National Hockey League franchise with the overt intention of moving it to Hamilton, Ontario. On October 5, 2006, Balsillie made a bid to purchase the Pittsburgh Penguins franchise for US$185 million from owners Mario Lemieux and Ronald Burkle. On December 15, 2006, Balsillie withdrew his bid to buy the team after receiving a notice from NHL commissioner Gary Bettman that the league would negotiate the arena deal on his behalf and the league also wanted the right to take over the team if necessary.

On May 23, 2007, it was announced that Balsillie had reached a tentative agreement to buy the Nashville Predators from Craig Leipold. On June 28, 2007, CBC.ca reported that Leipold had decided not to sign a binding agreement with Balsillie. Though Balsillie offered lip service that he would keep the team in Nashville, he reactivated a deal to become the primary tenant of Copps Coliseum in Hamilton and was already selling season tickets in the city, which influenced the decision to deny Balsillie the Predators.

On May 5, 2009, Balsillie made an offer of US$212.5 million to purchase the Phoenix Coyotes following the team's filing for bankruptcy protection in Arizona. In a press release from Toronto, the offer to purchase was described as conditional on relocation to Southern Ontario. At the request of then-owner, Jerry Moyes, Balsillie agreed to post debtor-in-possession financing of $17 million to allow the Coyotes to operate in advance of a restructuring or a sale. A few hours later, the NHL, citing a proxy agreement signed by Moyes, removed him from all decision-making regarding the future of the Coyotes. On June 15, 2009, Judge Redfield T. Baum rejected Balsillie's bid to purchase the Coyotes from the bankruptcy trustee. Judge Baum's ruling stated that he did not have the power to force the team to move and that Balsillie's June 29 deadline did not give the court enough time to resolve all the issues in the case. On September 30, 2009, Balsillie's bid was again rejected by Judge Baum, who also rejected the NHL's bid. Balsillie's bid was rejected "with prejudice," preventing him from making another bid for the Coyotes. Balsillie did not appeal the ruling.

It was rumoured that Balsillie made an unnamed bid to purchase the Buffalo Sabres during their sale in 2011 to Terry Pegula. It was also rumoured that Balsillie was interested in purchasing the Atlanta Thrashers prior to their 2011 purchase, relocation, and rebranding as the Winnipeg Jets by True North Sports & Entertainment, but neither of these rumours was confirmed.

=== Philanthropic work and awards ===
Balsillie is a philanthropist who supports numerous local and national initiatives. In 2007, he donated CA$50 million to the University of Waterloo, Wilfrid Laurier University and the Centre for International Governance Innovation (CIGI) as part of a $100 million (equivalent to $147 million in 2025) initiative to create the Balsillie School of International Affairs (BSIA). Balsillie created the Canadian International Council (CIC) through a partnership with the Canadian Institute of International Affairs (CIAA) and CIGI. He is also the founder of the Council of Canadian Innovators.

Balsillie has contributed resources and time to organizations such as Waterloo Children's Museum, Grand River Hospital, the Canadian Olympic Foundation and others.

In 2012, Osgoode Hall Law School faculty council rejected Balsillie's proposed $60 million collaboration between the school and CIGI, split into two equal donations by each of the CIGI and the Government of Ontario to establish a school of international relations at York University and fund 10 research chairs in international law.

In June 2013, the Harper government appointed Balsillie as Chair of Sustainable Development Technology Canada.

In October 2022, he published an op-ed in The Globe and Mail critical of the Trudeau government for proposing the Digital Charter Implementation Act 2022 (Bill C-27), writing that it "normalizes and expands surveillance and treats privacy as an obstacle to corporate profits, not as a fundamental human right or even a right to effective consumer protection."

== Personal life ==
Jim Balsillie married his wife Heidi, in 1989 in Hamilton, Ontario. They had two children before separating in 2011.

He serves as the Honorary Captain of HMCS Star in the Royal Canadian Navy.

When asked about potential political aspirations, Balsillie stated that "I'd be the worst politician in the world—if I don't like people, I can't hide it". He maintains that all three major political parties in Canada have made unsuccessful efforts to recruit him.

== In popular culture ==
Glenn Howerton portrayed Balsillie in the 2023 film BlackBerry. Balsillie has stated Howerton's portrayal of him is inaccurate and exaggerated. Balsillie was portrayed as arrogant, rude, and aggressive in the film, while being extremely effective, thus making him anti-heroic.

He has said the consensus on his characterisation is that it was "5% accurate, and 95% made-up", but also said that he could take being teased, having lived 60 years with his last name containing the words "balls" and "silly". Balsillie helped promote the film by doing television interviews and attending premieres. He praised Howerton's performance as "brilliant".

Business positions
Preceded by Company Founded 1984	Research in Motion Co-CEO (with Mike Lazaridis); 1984-2012	Succeeded by Thorsten Heins
