= Interstate 5 immigrant crossing signs =

California signs on car crashes with immigrants

The immigration sign, depicted a man, woman, and girl with pigtails running

The Interstate 5 immigrant crossing signs were California highway safety signs warning motorists to avoid hitting undocumented immigrants darting across the road. It depicted a man, woman, and girl with pigtails running. The California Department of Transportation (Caltrans) erected the signs in 1990 in response to over one hundred immigrant pedestrian deaths due to traffic collisions from 1987 to 1990 in two corridors along Interstate 5 along the San Ysidro Port of Entry at the Mexico–United States border and approximately 50 miles (80 km) north at the San Clemente United States Border Patrol checkpoint in Camp Pendleton. Eventually the signs became obsolete after Caltrans erected fences in the freeway's median, and the Border Patrol implemented Operation Gatekeeper in 1995, forcing illegal immigration attempts further east. No longer needing to replace them after they became dilapidated, the last immigration sign disappeared by 2018. The sign remains a pop culture icon.

== History ==
Immigrant smugglers adopted the tactic of dropping off their human cargo on the shoulder or median of the freeway prior to passing through the checkpoint. Once past the checkpoint, the smugglers would wait for the immigrants to rejoin before proceeding to the final destination. However, in order to avoid the checkpoint (straddling the northbound lanes of the freeway), the immigrants would have to cross the freeway to the southbound shoulder. At the Camp Pendleton checkpoint, immigrants were precluded from passing the checkpoint on the northbound shoulder by rugged terrain and random Marine patrols. The running family silhouette supplemented all-text signs advising drivers "Caution Watch For People Crossing Road".

The all text sign that was specified by the California Manual on Uniform Traffic Control Devices.

The running family silhouette signs were erected starting in September 1990, and it is not known how effective they were in reducing traffic strike fatalities before the implementation of other physical measures. A total of 10 were installed. Eventually, Caltrans built a tall fence in the I-5 median south of the San Clemente checkpoint, which effectively precluded the checkpoint-avoidance traffic-crossing tactic at Camp Pendleton, and the Border Patrol implemented Operation Gatekeeper in 1995, which erected a tall fence along the San Diego–Tijuana border, moving illegal immigration attempts further east into the desert.

As of 2008 and later confirmed in July 2017, one sign remained in California, and there were no plans to replace it if it became dilapidated, as it was largely obsolete. The number of people apprehended while illegally crossing the border in the region had seen a 95% decline over thirty years, going from 628,000 arrested in 1986 to 31,891 in 2016. By February 2018, the last sign had disappeared. It was located alongside Interstate 5 near San Ysidro.

== Design and reuse ==
Caltrans graphic artist John Hood, a Navajo Vietnam War veteran, created the image as an assignment in response to the sharp rise in immigrant traffic deaths. The image was developed to elicit immediate recognition of the potential traffic hazard and to illustrate the potential running motion with the little girl's flowing pigtails. The final design process took approximately a week, and Hood drew inspiration from both his experiences in Vietnam as well as stories from his Navajo parents. Hood has stated the man's profile is similar to Cesar Chavez, and the child was depicted as a little girl being dragged along because "little girls are dear to the heart, especially for fathers." Hood likened the immigrants' plight to the Long Walk of the Navajo to their present-day reservation in northeastern New Mexico in 1864.

It was troublesome that there was a mass exodus, especially families. And when you talk about families, you talk about children. They were getting slaughtered in the freeways. The children don't know what's happening and why they are there. [And] why their parents are doing it. They just know this is not their home. The sign conveys that they are away from home. And the children are asking, 'What are we running for?' Today, even when I watch parents walking in malls with their kids, it's like they are dragging them. That was the idea: clutching something that is dear to our heart.

— John Hood, Caltrans graphic artist, Interview with Victor Morales

Since its deployment, it has become a pop culture icon as it appeared on T-shirts and anti-immigration advertisements in various incarnations. The sign can be seen in Fast & Furious when the two main characters drive south to the Mexican border. It was exhibited in the Smithsonian Institution's permanent exhibition on transportation, and British street artist Banksy used a modified version of the silhouette family in his Kite-2 artwork exhibited on Los Angeles-area streets in early 2011. The silhouette family is also a popular target of parody, spawning variants including ones where the family is depicted wearing caps and gowns (referencing the DREAM Act); as Joseph, Mary and Jesus; as a beer label; and one where they are wearing Pilgrim gear. In June 2018, political cartoonist Rob Rogers was fired from the Pittsburgh Post-Gazette after submitting a series of cartoons critical of President Donald Trump, one of which depicted a version of the caution sign with the trailing child being torn away by a silhouetted Trump.
