= Kentucky Transportation Center =

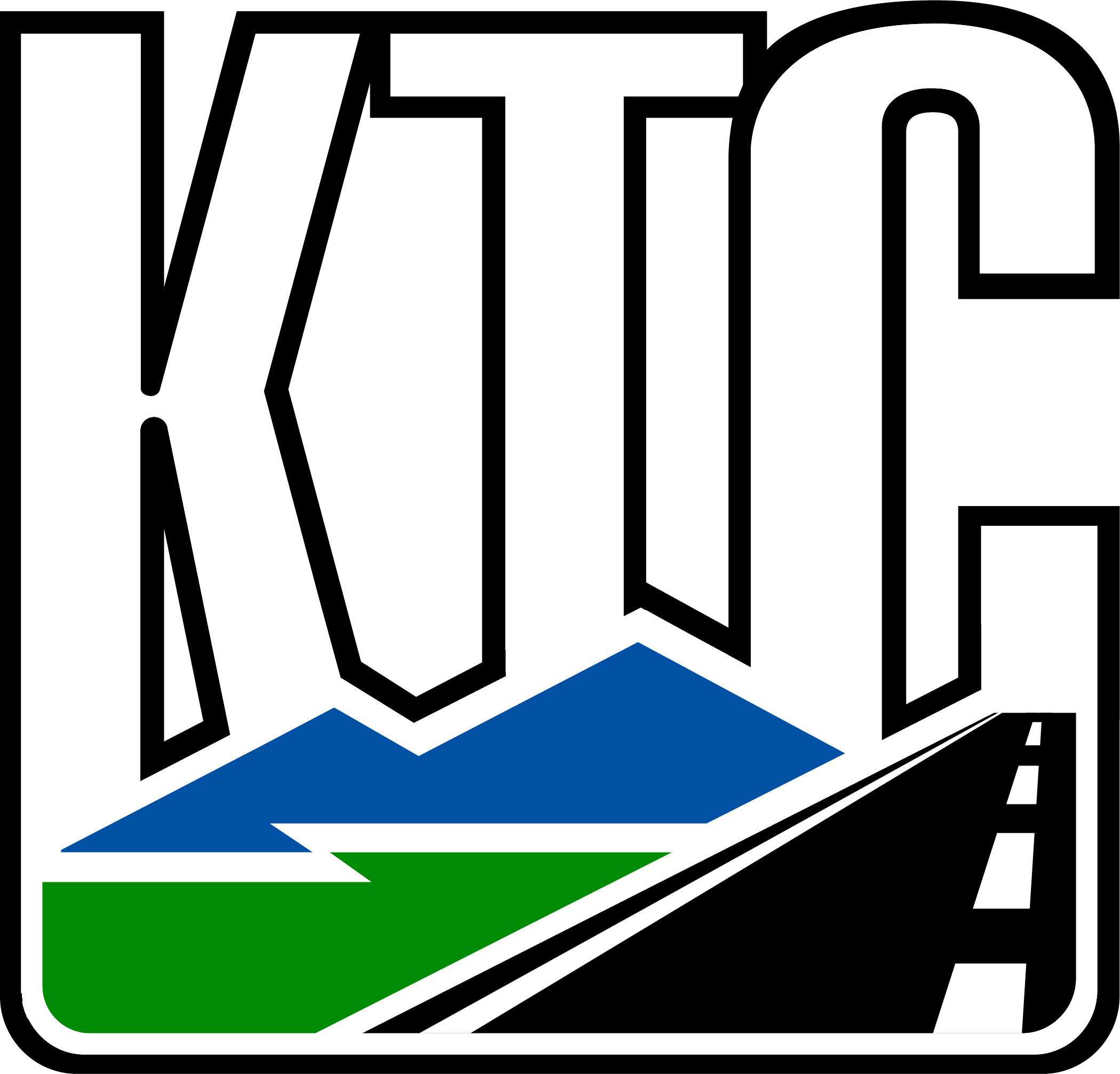
KTC Logo

The Kentucky Transportation Center (or KTC) is a university transportation research center within the University of Kentucky College of Engineering. Founded in 1941 as the Division of Research of the Kentucky Department of Highways, KTC became part of the university in 1981.

KTC is a hub of applied multidisciplinary transportation research. KTC has built a strong partnership with the Kentucky Transportation Cabinet, and also works with other clients and transportation agencies across the United States.

KTC has 14 program areas including:

- Bridge Preservation
- Business Office
- Construction Engineering & Project Development
- Education Planning & Decision Analytics
- Intelligent Transportation Systems
- Marketing, Media, & Technical Review
- Occupational Safety & Health
- Pavements, Materials, Geotechnology, & Infrastructure Assessment
- Policy, Finance, & Economics
- Project Development
- Special Projects & Initiatives
- Structures
- Technology Transfer
- Traffic & Safety

KTC is housed on the University of Kentucky campus with their main office located in the Oliver H. Raymond building. KTC shares this space with and enjoys a strong relationship with the Department of Civil Engineering at UK.
