= Diagrammatic sign =

A diagrammatic guide sign for a fork leading to northbound and southbound Saskatchewan Highway 11.

A common diagrammatic intersection sign in India.

A diagrammatic sign or diagrammatic guide sign is a type of guide sign that indicates destinations using a large, map-like illustration of the road layout. The term is most commonly associated with diagrammatic signs installed ahead of forks in controlled-access highways to indicate the destination of each lane.

== Usage ==
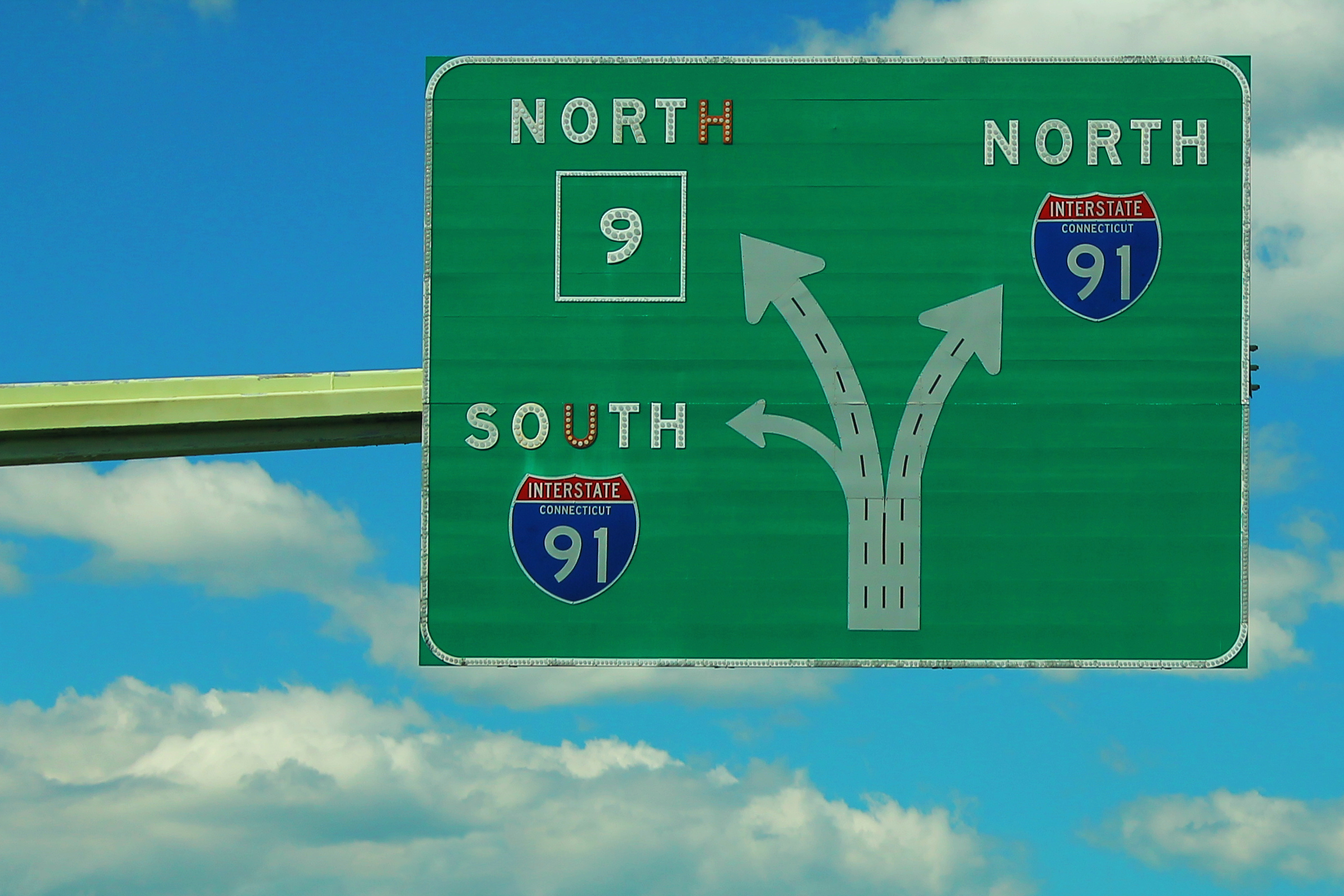
A diagrammatic guide sign for a three-way fork leading to southbound Interstate 91, Connecticut Route 9, and northbound Interstate 91.

Diagrammatic signs are specified in the Manual on Uniform Traffic Control Devices developed by the United States Federal Highway Administration, as one of several options for exits and splits on multilane freeways. A simpler kind of diagrammatic sign without lane detail is allowed for indicating a series of exits along a conventional street or roundabout. They also appear in other countries influenced by the MUTCD.

Diagrammatic signs have been a recommended method of signposting exits and splits in Massachusetts and New York. By contrast, California, Minnesota, Ohio, and Mississippi make extensive use of pull-through or arrow-per-lane signs to indicate lane assignments. Tennessee and Utah rely on pavement markings to communicate lane assignments.

On December 14, 2020, the Federal Highway Administration proposed several changes to an upcoming edition of the MUTCD that would streamline some diagrammatic signs or eliminate the use of diagrammatic signs on freeways and expressways, citing the successful introduction of arrow-per-lane signs. Simplified diagrammatic signs would continue to be used at roundabouts and other conventional streets where lane detail is not required.

== Effectiveness ==
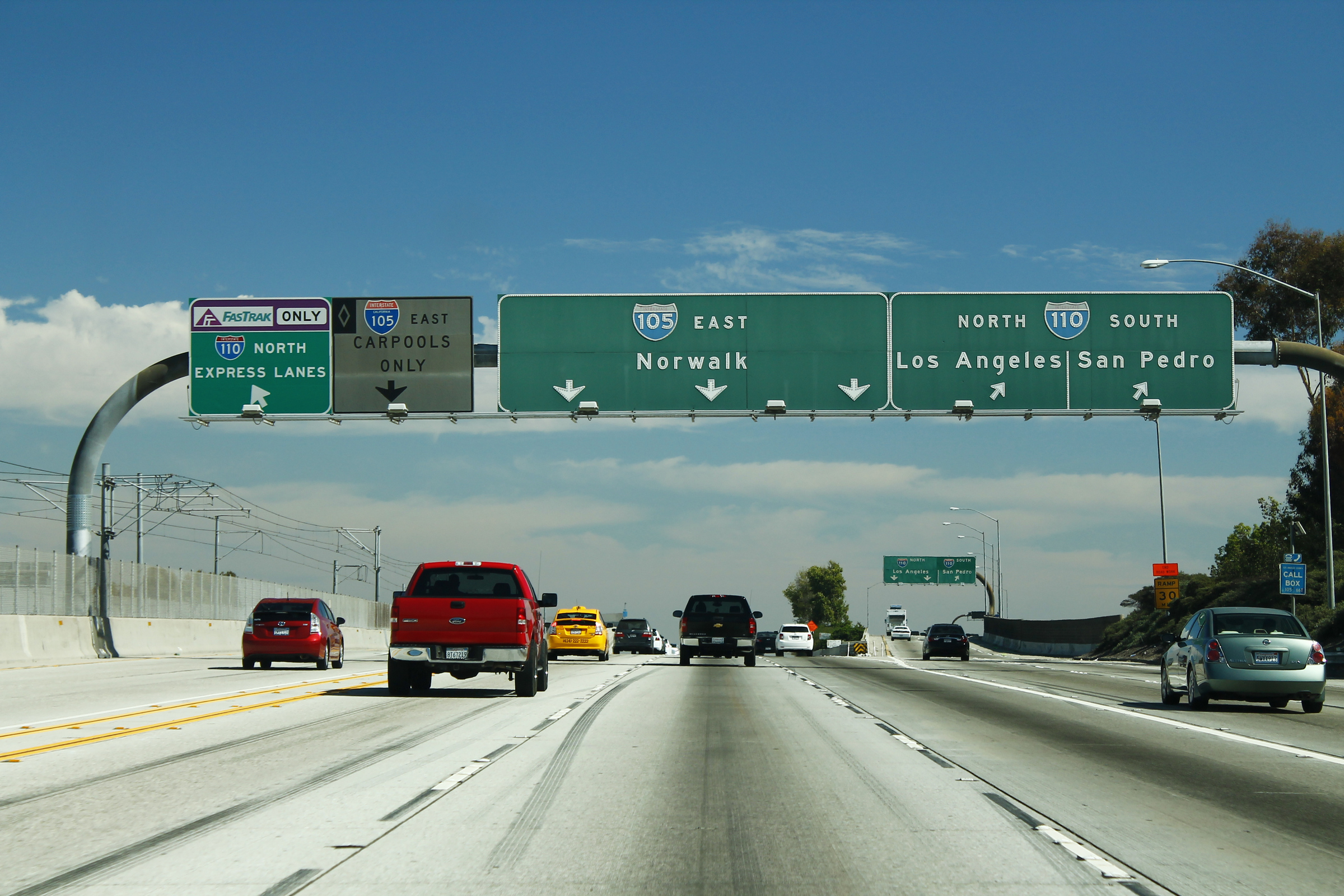
Overhead pull-through signs for Interstate 110 and Interstate 105 in California.

Diagrammatic signs have been shown to be less effective than conventional, text-only signs (e.g., "Left 2 Lanes") and overhead arrow-per-lane signs because of the additional time it takes to comprehend them. A 2006 study by the Texas A&M Transportation Institute found that diagrammatic signs performed poorly compared to text-only signs for left-side exits and performed similarly to text-only signs for right-side exits. A 2008 study found a clear advantage to arrow-per-lane signs compared to diagrammatic signs, especially among older drivers.
