= Quarterhill =

Canadian technology holding company

Quarterhill Inc.
- Type: Public
- Traded as: TSX: QTRH; OTCQX: QTRHF
- Industry: Patent monetization, Internet of Things, Electronic toll collection, Intelligent transportation system
- Founded: 1992
- Headquarters: Toronto, Ontario, Canada
- Area served: Worldwide
- Key people: Rusty Lewis (Chair of the Board); Chuck Myers (Chief Executive Officer)
- Subsidiaries: International Road Dynamics, Electronic Transaction Consultants (ETC)
- Website: www.quarterhill.com

Quarterhill Inc. (formerly WiLan Inc.) is a Canadian public technology holding company, based in Toronto, Ontario. It was founded in 1992 as a wireless technology company. In the mid-2000s, it gradually transitioned into a patent licensing company. In 2017, it renamed itself Quarterhill, and is attempting to become a holding company specializing in the Internet of Things. It is listed on the Toronto Stock Exchange and was listed on NASDAQ until 2019.

== History ==
WiLan was founded in 1992 by Hatim Zaghloul and Michel Fattouche to commercialize their Wideband Orthogonal Frequency Division Multiplexing (WOFDM) technology. It was originally based in Calgary, Alberta, and the name was an acronym for "Wireless Local Area Network". In March 1998, WiLAN had its initial public offering on the Alberta Stock Exchange at $2.50 per share (it later listed on the Toronto Stock Exchange). WiLAN enjoyed significant success in the context of the tech bubble at the time, but its fortunes changed when the bubble collapsed. From October 1999 to March 2000, WiLan's share price increased from $10 to $94, but it fell back down to $12 by November 2000. By February 2006, the price had fallen to 66 cents.

In 2005, WiLAN reached a significant patent licensing deal with Cisco Systems. In 2006 WiLAN divested its various technology product lines to refocus its business on licensing intellectual property and patent rights. As part of this change of strategy, it replaced its CEO, Bill Dunbar, with Jim Skippen, who served as president and CEO of WiLAN until July 2018. Founder Hatim Zaghloul resigned from the board. At the same time, the company moved its headquarters from Calgary to Ottawa.

The company's change in strategy was initially successful, and it managed to sign a $50 million license deal with Nokia, allowing Nokia to use WiLAN's wireless patents. From 2006 to 2011, WiLAN expanded its portfolio of patents from 20 to 3,000. WiLAN in turn licensed out this patented technology to companies such as Nokia, LG Electronics, Samsung, Fujitsu, RIM, Intel, Broadcom and Panasonic. From 2011 to 2015, WiLAN experienced significant headwinds, as a less favorable legal climate led to licensees less willing to pay for patents. Of particular note was WiLAN's 2013 loss of a patent lawsuit against Apple Inc.

in June 2015, WiLAN announced it had signed a multi-year licensing agreement with Samsung, allowing Samsung to use technology in WiLAN's new Qimonda portfolio. In late 2015, WiLAN announced that, beginning in October 2015, it would undergo a significant company restructuring. As part of this restructuring, WiLAN announced that it would spin off its research and development unit and cut its dividend to shareholders. The restructuring would affect 30 per cent of WiLAN's workforce. The company would also focus on licensing patent portfolios owned by other companies and helping companies monetize their patents.

In April 2017, WiLAN acquired International Road Dynamics, a Saskatoon-based road traffic management system engineering company, for $63.5 million. In May 2017, it acquired VIZIYA, a software services provider, for $40 million. These acquisitions were part of a broader restructuring at WiLAN from a patent licensing company to a more diversified technology holding company, specializing in the industrial Internet of Things. As part of the restructuring, WiLan was renamed Quarterhill, although the Will Inc., was created, which contains WiLan Inc., International Road Dynamics, and VIZIYA as subsidiaries.

In October 2019, Quarterhill announced that Doug Parker had resigned as president and CEO of Quarterhill. Parker was hired as CEO in January 2018. The company also announced that Parker had resigned from Quarterhill's board at the same time.

In April 2024, it was announced Quarterhill had completed the acquisition of the Buckinghamshire, UK-headquartered automatic vehicle detection and classification software company, Red Fox ID. for an undisclosed amount.

== Business ==
Quarterhill's principal business is patent licensing, through its WiLAN subsidiary. Its business model is to acquire technology patents, and then license them to companies who use them. The model relies on the threat of legal action against companies who use its patents without permission. It has thus sometimes been described as a patent troll, because it profits from patents, but does not commercialize or develop technologies itself. As of 2015, WiLAN had more than 250 licensees.
