= Cantech Letter =

Canadian technology stocks magazine

The Cantech Letter, formerly known as the Dollarton Cantech Letter, is a monthly online magazine about Canadian technology stocks, established in 2010 by Nick Waddell. Cantech Letter publishes articles, interviews and analyses of the companies in the Toronto Stock Exchange Technology, Cleantech and Life Sciences Indices.

== History and profile ==
Founded in 2010, the Cantech Letter was originally known as the Smalltech Letter. In 2010, it was acquired by Dollarton Capital and became the Dollarton Cantech Letter. Now called the Cantech Letter, it is a part of Cantech Communications of North Vancouver, British Columbia.

The Cantech Letter has drawn content from contributors such as Kirk Exner of Newcoast Capital, Adam Adamou of Caseridge Capital, and Ron Shuttleworth of M Partners and Razor Capital Partners.

The Cantech Letter has published several articles that address a perceived lack of government and industry support for Canadian technology and Research and Development firms. A roundtable discussion in August 2009 used the delisting of former telecommunications giant Nortel to discuss how to support and encourage technology, the role of the Canadian government, and the cultivation of technology "clusters" such as those found in Ottawa and Kitchener-Waterloo.

The Cantech Letter maintains an index of companies that rank especially high when using five quantitative analysis tools, such as the price–sales ratio and the debt to market capitalization.
