= International Fuel Tax Agreement =

Agreement between 48 US states and Canada

The International Fuel Tax Agreement (or IFTA) is an agreement between the lower 48 states of the United States and the Canadian provinces, to simplify the reporting of fuel use by motor carriers that operate in more than one jurisdiction. Alaska, Hawaii, and the Canadian territories are not required to participate, however all of Canada and Alaska do. An operating carrier with IFTA receives an IFTA license and two decals for each qualifying vehicle it operates. The carrier files a quarterly fuel tax report. This report is used to determine the net tax or refund due and to redistribute taxes from collecting states to states that it is due.

This tax is required for motor vehicles used, designed, or maintained for transportation of persons or property and:

- The Power Unit has two axles and a gross vehicle weight or registered gross vehicle weight in excess of 26,000 pounds, and/or
- The Power Unit has three or more axles regardless of weight, and/or
- Is used in combination, when the weight of such combination exceeds 26,000 pounds gross vehicle or registered gross vehicle weight.

Exceptions exist for recreational vehicles such as motor homes, pickup trucks with attached campers, and buses when used exclusively for personal pleasure by an individual. Some states have their own exemptions that often apply to farm vehicles or government vehicles.

== Promulgation ==
Prior to IFTA each state had its own fuel tax system and a truck needed tax permits for each state in which it operated. Most states established Ports of Entry to issue permits and enforce tax collection, which was burdensome to the trucking industry and the states. Pre-IFTA trucks in interstate commerce carried special plates ("Bingo Plates") upon which each state's permit sticker was affixed. The states eventually found this both costly and inefficient.

== How it works ==
IFTA works as a "pay now or pay later" system. As commercial motor vehicles buy fuel, any fuel taxes paid are credited to that licensee's account. At the end of the fiscal quarter, the licensee completes a fuel tax report, listing all miles traveled in all participating jurisdictions and lists total volume purchased. Then the average fuel mileage is applied to the miles traveled to determine the tax liability to each jurisdiction. Three states—Kentucky, New Mexico, and New York—have "weight-mile" taxes in addition to the standard fuel tax. Oregon has just a weight-mile tax. Any amount of fuel taxes due (or refund) is then paid to (or received from) the base jurisdiction which issued the license. The member jurisdictions then take care of transferring the funds accordingly. Audits are conducted only by the base state and fuel bonds are rarely required.
