= Weigh in motion =

Device designed to capture and record a vehicle's axle weights and gross vehicle weights

Weigh-in-motion or weighing-in-motion (WIM) devices are designed to capture and record the axle weights and gross vehicle weights as vehicles drive over a measurement site. Unlike static scales, WIM systems are capable of measuring vehicles traveling at a reduced or normal traffic speed and do not require the vehicle to come to a stop. This makes the weighing process more efficient, and, in the case of commercial vehicles, allows for trucks under the weight limit to bypass static scales or inspection.

== Introduction ==
Weigh-in-motion is a technology that can be used for various private and public purposes (i.e. applications) related to the weights and axle loads of road and rail vehicles. WIM systems are installed on the road or rail track or on a vehicle and measure, store and provide data from the traffic flow and/or the specific vehicle. For WIM systems certain specific conditions apply. These conditions have an impact on the quality and reliability of the data measured by the WIM system and of the durability of the sensors and WIM system itself.

WIM systems measure the dynamic axle loads of the vehicles and try to calculate the best possible estimate of the related static values. The WIM systems have to perform unattended, under harsh traffic and environmental conditions, often without any control over the way the vehicle is moving, or the driver is behaving. As a result of these specific measurement conditions, a successful implementation of a WIM system requires specific knowledge and experience.

The weight information consists of the gross vehicle weight and axle (group) loads combined with other parameters like: date and time, location, speed and vehicle class. For on-board WIM systems this pertains to the specific vehicle only. For in-road WIM systems this applies to the entire vehicle traffic flow.

This weight information provides the user with detailed knowledge of the loading of heavy goods vehicles. This information is better than with older technologies, so, for example, it is easier to match heavy goods vehicles and the road/rail infrastructure.(Moffatt, 2017).

== Road applications ==
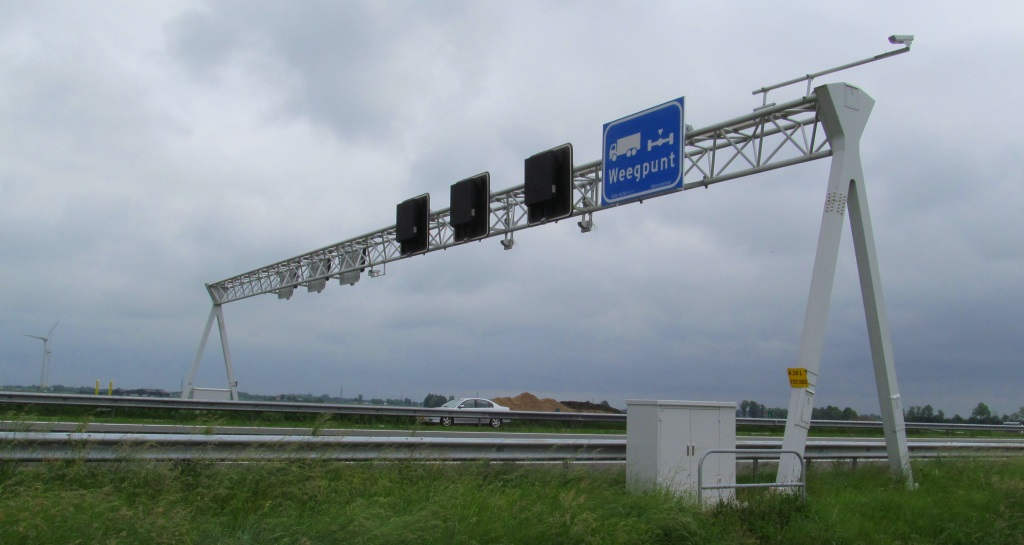
Weigh in motion location on the A28 motorway (Netherlands)

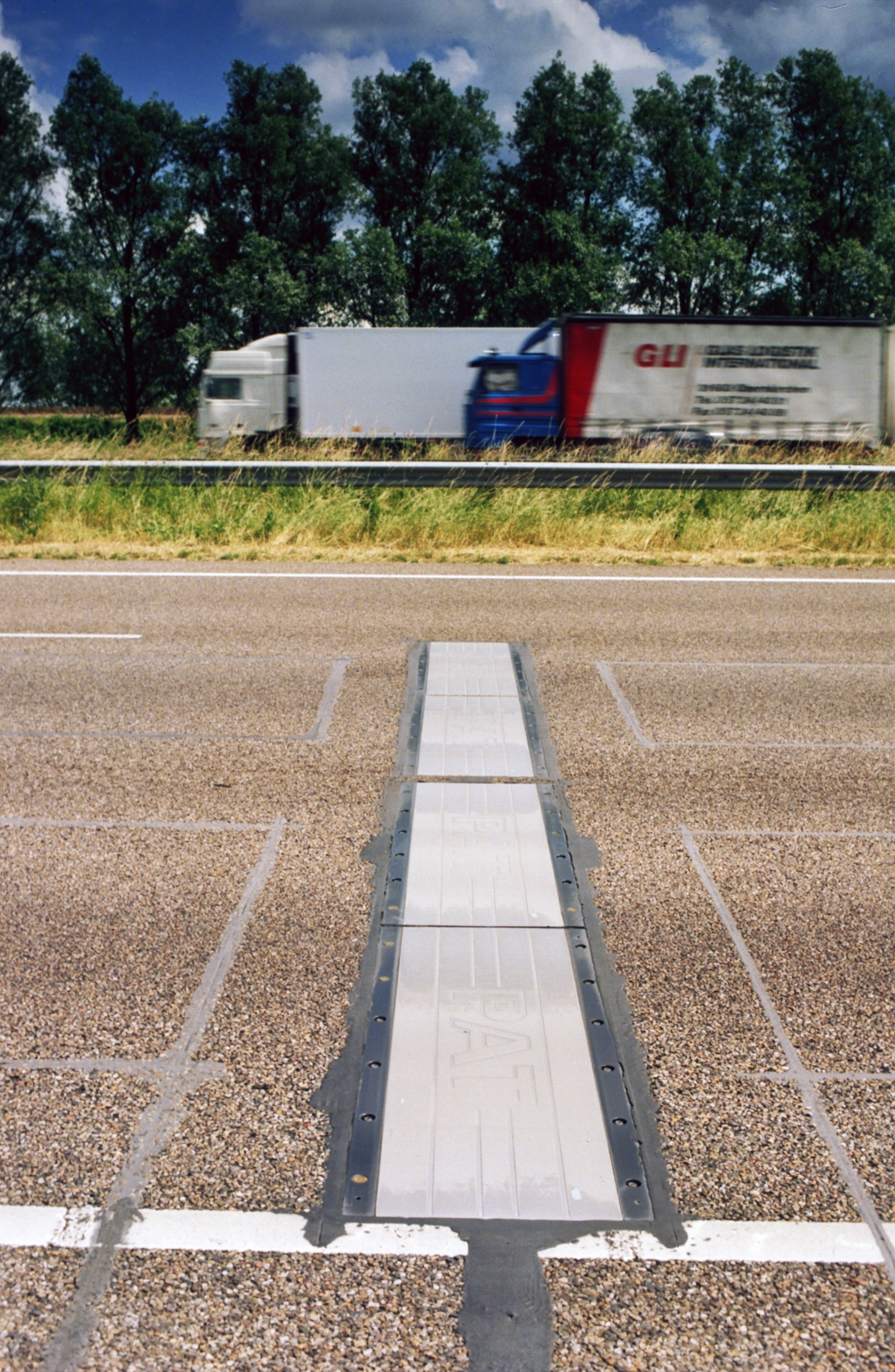
Axle load sensor

Especially for trucks, gross vehicle and axle weight monitoring is useful in an array of applications including:

- Pavement design, monitoring, and research
- Bridge design, monitoring, and research
- To inform weight overload enforcement policies and to directly facilitate enforcement
- Planning and freight movement studies
- Toll by weight
- Data to facilitate legislation and regulation

The most common road application of WIM data is probably pavement design and assessment. In the United States, a histogram of WIM data is used for this purpose. In the absence of WIM data, default histograms are available. Pavements are damaged through a mechanistic-empirical fatigue process that is commonly simplified as the fourth power law. In its original form, the fourth power law states that the rate of pavement damage is proportional to axle weight raised to the fourth power. WIM data provides information on the numbers of axles in each significant weight category which allows these kinds of calculations to be carried out.

Weigh in motion scales are often used to facilitate weight overload enforcement, such as the Federal Motor Carrier Safety Administration's Commercial Vehicle Information Systems and Networks program. Weigh-in-motion systems can be used as part of traditional roadside inspection stations, or as part of virtual inspection stations. In most countries, WIM systems are not considered sufficiently accurate for direct enforcement of overloaded vehicles but this may change in the future.

The most common bridge application of WIM is the assessment of traffic loading. The intensity of traffic on a bridge varies greatly as some roads are much busier than others. For bridges that have deteriorated, this is important as a less heavily trafficked bridge is safer and more heavily trafficked bridges should be prioritized for maintenance and repair. A great deal of research has been carried out on the subject of traffic loading on bridges, both short-span, including an allowance for dynamics, and long-span.

Recent years have seen the rise of several "specialty" Weigh-in-Motion systems. One popular example is the front fork garbage truck scale. In this application, a container is weighed—while it is full—as the driver lifts, and again—while it is empty—as the container is returned to the ground. The difference between the full and empty weights is equal to the weight of the contents.

=== Use ===
Countries using Weigh in motion on highways include:

- Australia
- Belgium
- Brazil
- Czech Republic
- France
- Germany
- Greece
- China
- Italy
- Japan
- New Zealand
- Poland
- The Netherlands
- Ukraine
- United Arab Emirates
- United Kingdom
- United States (Usage varies from state to state)

== Accuracy ==
The accuracy of weigh-in-motion data is generally much less than for static weigh scales where the environment is better controlled. The European COST 323 group developed an accuracy classification framework in the 1990s. They also coordinated three independently controlled road tests of commercially available and prototype WIM systems, one in Switzerland, one in France (Continental Motorway Test) and one in Northern Sweden (Cold Environment Test). Better accuracy can be achieved with multiple-sensor WIM systems and careful compensation for the effects of temperature. The Federal Highway Administration in the United States has published quality assurance criteria for WIM systems whose data is included in the Long Term Pavement Performance project.

== System basics of most systems ==
=== Sensors ===
WIM systems can employ various types of sensors for measurement.

The earliest WIM systems, still used in a minority of installations, use an instrumented existing bridge as the weighing platform. Bending plates span a void cut into the pavement and use the flexure as the wheel passes over as a measure of weight. Load cells use strain sensors in the corner supports of a large platform embedded in the road.

The majority of systems today are strip sensors - pressure sensitive materials installed in a 2 to 3 cm groove cut into the road pavement. In strip sensors, various sensing materials are used, including piezo-polymer, piezo-ceramic, capacitive and piezo-quartz. Many of these sensing systems are temperature-dependent and algorithms are used to correct for this.

Strain transducers are used in bridge WIM systems. Strain gauges are used to measure the flexure in bending plates and the deformation in load cells. The strip sensor systems use piezo-electric materials in the groove.

Capacitive systems measure the capacitance between two closely placed charged plates.

More recently, weighing sensors using optical fiber grating sensors have been proposed.

=== Charge amplifiers ===
High impedance charge signals are amplified with MOSFET based charge amplifiers and converted to a voltage output, which is connected to analysis system.

=== Inductive loops ===
Inductive loops define the vehicle entry and exit from the WIM station. These signals are used as triggering inputs to start and stop the measurement to initiate totaling gross vehicle weight of each vehicle. They also measure total vehicle length and help with vehicle classification. For toll gate or low speed applications, inductive loops may be replaced by other types of vehicle sensors such as light curtains, axle sensors or piezocables.

=== Measurement system ===
The high speed measurement system is programmed to perform calculations of the following parameters:

Axle distances, individual axle weights, gross vehicle weight, vehicle speed, distance between vehicles, and the GPS synchronized time stamp for each vehicle measurement.

The measurement system should be environmentally protected, should have a wide operating temperature range and withstand condensation.

=== Registration plate reading ===
Cameras for automatic number-plate recognition may be part of the system to check the measured weight against maximum allowable weight for the vehicle and, in case of exceeded limits, inform law enforcement in order to pursue the vehicle or to directly fine the owner.

=== Communications ===
Variety of communication methods need to be installed on the measurement system. A modem or cellular modem can be provided. In older installations or where no communication infrastructure exists, WIM systems can be self-operating while saving the data, to later physically retrieve it.

=== Data archiving ===
A WIM system connected with any available communication means can be connected to a central monitoring server. Automatic data archiving software is required to retrieve the data from many remote WIM stations to be available for any further processing. A central database can be built to link many WIMs to a server for a variety of monitoring and enforcement purposes.

== Rail applications ==
Weighing in motion is also a common application in rail transport. Known applications are

- Asset protection (imbalances, overloading)
- Asset management
- Maintenance planning
- Legislation and regulation
- Administration and planning

=== System basics ===
There are two main parts to the measurement system: the track-side component, which contains hardware for communication, power, computation, and data acquisition, and the rail-mounted component, which consists of sensors and cabling. Known sensor principles include:

- strain gauges: measuring the strain usually in the hub of the rail
- fiber optical sensors: measuring a change of light intensity caused by the bending of the rail
- load cells: Measuring the strain change in the load cell rather than directly on the rail itself.
- laser based systems: measuring the displacement of the rail

=== Yards and main line ===
Trains are weighed, either on the main line or at yards. Weighing in Motion systems installed on the main lines measure the complete weight (distribution) of the trains as they pass by at the designated line speed. Weighing in motion on the mainline is therefore also referred to as "coupled-in-motion weighing": all of the railcars are coupled. Weighing in motion at yards often measure individual wagons. It requires that the railcar are uncoupled on both ends in order to weigh. Weighing in motion at yards is therefore also referred to as "uncoupled-in-motion weighing". Systems installed at yards usually works at lower speeds and are capable of higher accuracies.

== Airport applications ==
Some airports use airplane weighing, whereby the plane taxis across the scale bed, and its weight is measured. The weight may then be used to correlate with the pilot's log entry, to ensure there is just enough fuel, with a little margin for safety. This has been used for some time to conserve jet fuel.

Also, the main difference in these platforms, which are basically a "transmission of weight" application, there are checkweighers, also known as dynamic scales or in-motion scales.

== International cooperation and standards ==
The International Society for Weigh-In-Motion (ISWIM, www.is-wim) is an international non-profit organization, legally established in Switzerland in 2007. ISWIM is an international network of, and for, people and organisations active in the field of weigh-in-motion. The society brings together users, researchers, and vendors of WIM systems. This includes systems installed in or under the road pavements, bridges, rail tracks and on board vehicles. ISWIM organises periodically the international conferences on WIM (ICWIM), regional seminars and workshops as part of other international conferences and exhibitions.

In the 1990s, the first WIM standard ASTM-E1318-09 was published in North America, and the COST 323 action provided draft European specifications of WIM as well as reports on Pan-European tests of WIM system. The European research project WAVE and other initiatives delivered improved technologies and new methodologies of WIM. These first tests were done with the combination of WIM systems with video as a tool to assist overloading enforcement controls.

In the early 2000s, the accuracy and reliability of WIM systems were significantly improved, and they were used more frequently for overload screening and pre-selection for road side weight enforcement controls (virtual weigh stations). The OIML R134 was published as an international standard of low speed WIM systems for legal applications like tolling by weight and direct weight enforcement. Most recently, the NMi-WIM standard offers a basis for the introduction of high speed WIM systems for direct automatic enforcement and free flow tolling by weight.
