= Black box (disambiguation) =

A black box is a device, object, or system whose inner workings are unknown; only the "stimuli inputs" and "output reactions" are known characteristics.

Black box may also refer to:

== Science and technology ==
- Black box (phreaking), a device to defeat telephone toll charges
- Eucalyptus largiflorens, a tree species with the common name black box
- A descrambling device for cable television piracy

=== Transportation ===
- Accident data recorder, an optional vehicle installable device to record information related to (near) traffic accidents
- Event data recorder, a device installed in some automobiles to record information related to vehicle crashes or accidents
- Flight recorder, an aircraft-borne device used in disaster investigation, consisting of a flight data recorder and cockpit voice recorder
  - Flight operations quality assurance
  - Quick access recorder
- Train event recorder, a device that records data about the operation of train controls and performance
- Voyage data recorder, a device designed to collect data from various sensors on board a ship

=== Computing ===
- Black box theory, a systems engineering theory for black boxes
- Black-box testing, a form of software testing that involves adjusting inputs to an application without reference to the source code of the application
- Blackbox, a window manager that works on X Window System platforms
- BlackBox Component Builder, software development environment for Component Pascal
- Sun Modular Datacenter, prototype name Project Blackbox

=== Medicine ===
- Any of a number of devices developed and sold by Albert Abrams, based on the pseudo-science of radionics
- Black box warning, a type of warning that may be applied to medicines in the United States

== Film and television ==
- Black Box (1978 film), an American short film by Scott B and Beth B
- Black Box (2002 film), an Argentine drama film (Caja Negra)
- Black Box (2013 film), an American drama film
- Black Box (2020 film), an American science-fiction horror film
- Black Box (2021 film), a Franco-Belgian mystery thriller film
- Black Box (2026 film), an American horror thriller film
- Black Box (TV series), a 2014 ABC television series
- Black Box (The Outer Limits), an episode from the 1995 revival of that TV series
- Survival in the Sky, a TV series on the investigations of aviation accidents known as Black Box in the UK
- The Black Box (2005 film), a French mystery film
- The Black Box (serial), a 1915 film serial
- Black Box (video magazine), a Hungarian documentary video magazine and filmmaking group

== Games ==
- Black Box (game), board and computer game
- Blackbox (video game), an iOS puzzle game
- EA Black Box, the video game studio formerly known as Black Box Games
- The Black Box, a canceled video game; See The Orange Box
- A name used to refer to the first thirty games released on the Nintendo Entertainment System

== Literature ==
- Black Box (short story), a short story by Jennifer Egan
- Black Box (novel), by Israeli writer Amos Oz
- Black Box (comics) a fictional character in the Marvel Comics Marvel Universe
- Black Box, a novel by Mario Giordano
- Black Box, a memoir by Shiori Itō
- Black-Box (manga), a Japanese manga series by Tsutomu Takahashi
- Blackbox (novel) by Nick Walker
- The Black Box (novel) by Michael Connelly
- La boîte noire ("The Black Box"), a Spirou et Fantasio comic album

== Music ==
- Black Box (band), Italian electro-dance music group
- "Black Box" (song), debut single of Australian Idol winner Stan Walker
- A Black Box, an album by Peter Hammill
- Black Box – Wax Trax! Records: The First 13 Years, a Wax Tax Box set album
- Black Box (Brown Eyed Girls album), album by South Korean group Brown Eyed Girls
- Black Box (Naked City album), compilation album by Naked City
- Black Box: The Complete Original Black Sabbath 1970–1978, a Black Sabbath album
- The Black Box (album), a box set album by Danish rock band Gasolin'

== Other uses ==
- Black box theater, simple unadorned performance space
- Nuclear football, the briefcase that accompanies the President of the United States and contains nuclear missile launch codes, nicknamed "Black Box"
- Censor bars
- Black box trading or algorithmic trading
- Black Box Corporation, a supplier of computer network hardware based in Mumbai, India and Dallas, Texas
- Black box approach to the function of states in international relations in theories such as realism and neorealism
- BlackBox (radio station), a radio station in Bordeaux, France
- Black Box (Handcuff Cover)

== See also ==
- Blackboxing, a social process in science studies
- Black box warning, U.S. warning on a prescription drug
- Black Box Affair, a 1966 Eurospy film
- Box (disambiguation)
- Black body
- Kaaba, a cube-shaped structure of importance to Islam
