= Dead mileage =

Public transport vehicle non-commercial movement

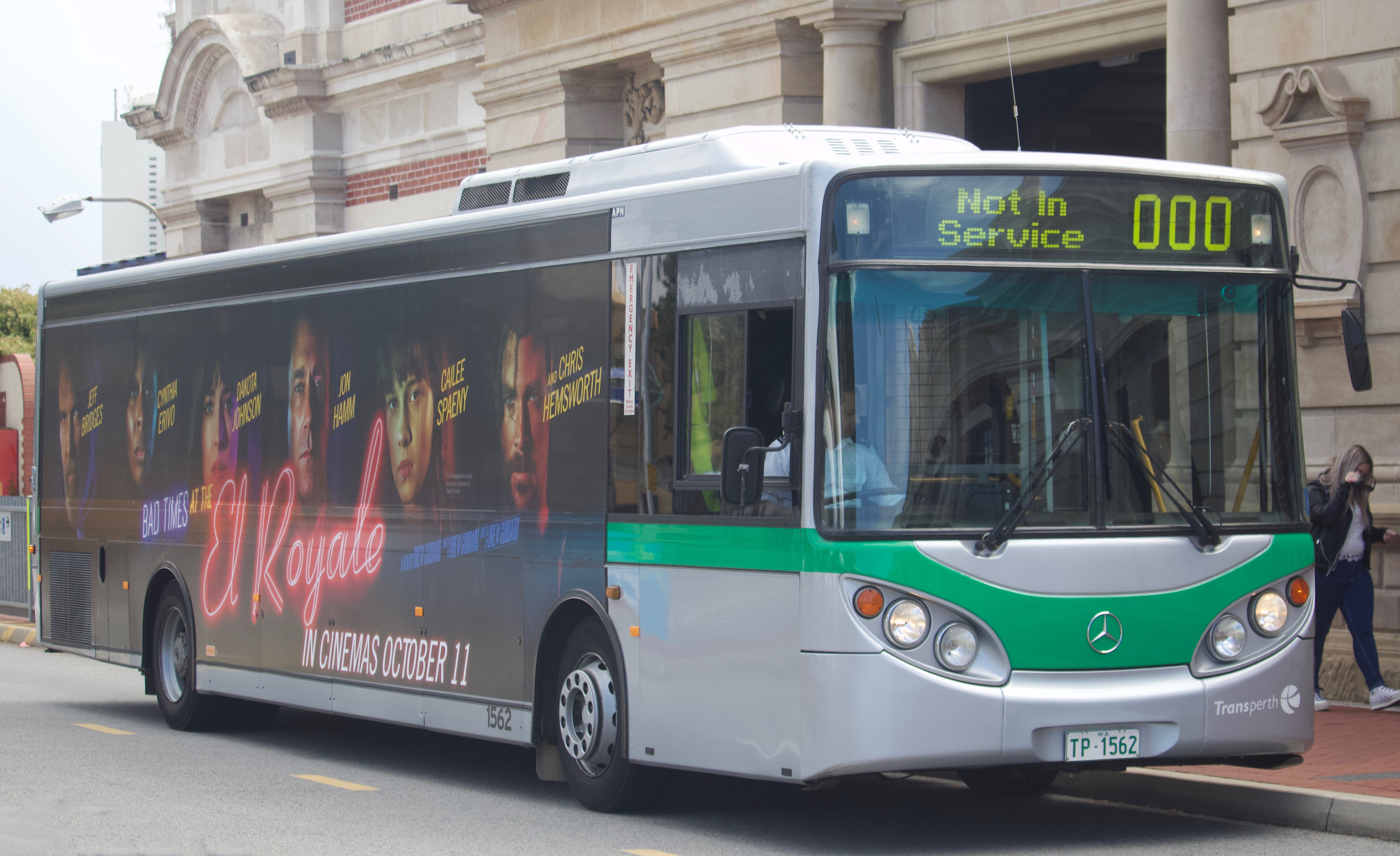
A Transperth bus is doing a dead mileage run back to the depot, so the destination sign reads "Not in Service 000".

Dead mileage, dead running, light running, empty cars or deadheading in public transport and empty leg in air charter is when a revenue-earning vehicle operates without carrying or accepting passengers, such as when coming from a garage to begin its first trip of the day. Similar terms in the UK include empty coaching stock (ECS) move and dead in tow (DIT).

The term deadheading or jumpseating also applies to the practice of allowing employees of a common carrier to travel in a vehicle as a non-revenue passenger. For example, an airline might assign a pilot living in New York to a flight from Denver to Los Angeles, and the pilot would simply catch any flight going to Denver, either wearing their uniform or showing ID, in lieu of buying a ticket. Also, some transport companies will allow employees to use the service when off duty, such as a city bus line allowing an off-duty driver to commute to and from work for free.

Additionally, inspectors from a regulatory agency may use transport on a deadhead basis to do inspections, such as a Federal Railroad Administration inspector riding a freight train to inspect for safety violations.

== Causes ==
Dead mileage routinely occurs when a route starts or finishes in a location away from a terminal or maintenance facility, and the start or end of a shift requires moving the vehicle without passengers.

== Effects, prevention, and mitigation ==
Dead mileage incurs costs for the operator in terms of non-revenue earning fuel use, wages, and a reduction in the driver's legal availability for revenue-generating driving.

Operators will often reduce dead mileage by starting or finishing the first or last service of the day, or shift, at a garage along the route, a so-called part service or part route. Dead mileage may also be reduced by the operation of routes specifically timed and routed to facilitate bus movements rather than passenger need. Often changing routes slightly (and ensuring high on time performance) can greatly increase the useful time-to-dead-mileage ratio for both crew and vehicles.

Cutting-edge technology has been also leveraged to preempt dead miles and find innovative ways to reduce downtime or in some cases replenish the empty or dead miles with revenue-generating backhaul. Artificial intelligence and other data science techniques can be used in a connected platform to predict and allocate loads in real-time and meet on-demand requests.

Dead mileage has increasingly become an issue with privatised competition for bus services, most notable with the privatisation of London bus services. Often operators will come to an arrangement to share garage facilities to reduce dead mileage.

Some air charter companies lease out their planes at a lower rate for the empty leg flights to attract rentals for originally non-revenue flights.

== See also ==
- The dictionary definition of deadheading at Wiktionary
- Deadheading (employee)
- Ferry flying
