= Alaska Airlines Flight 2059 =

2023 aircraft incident in Oregon

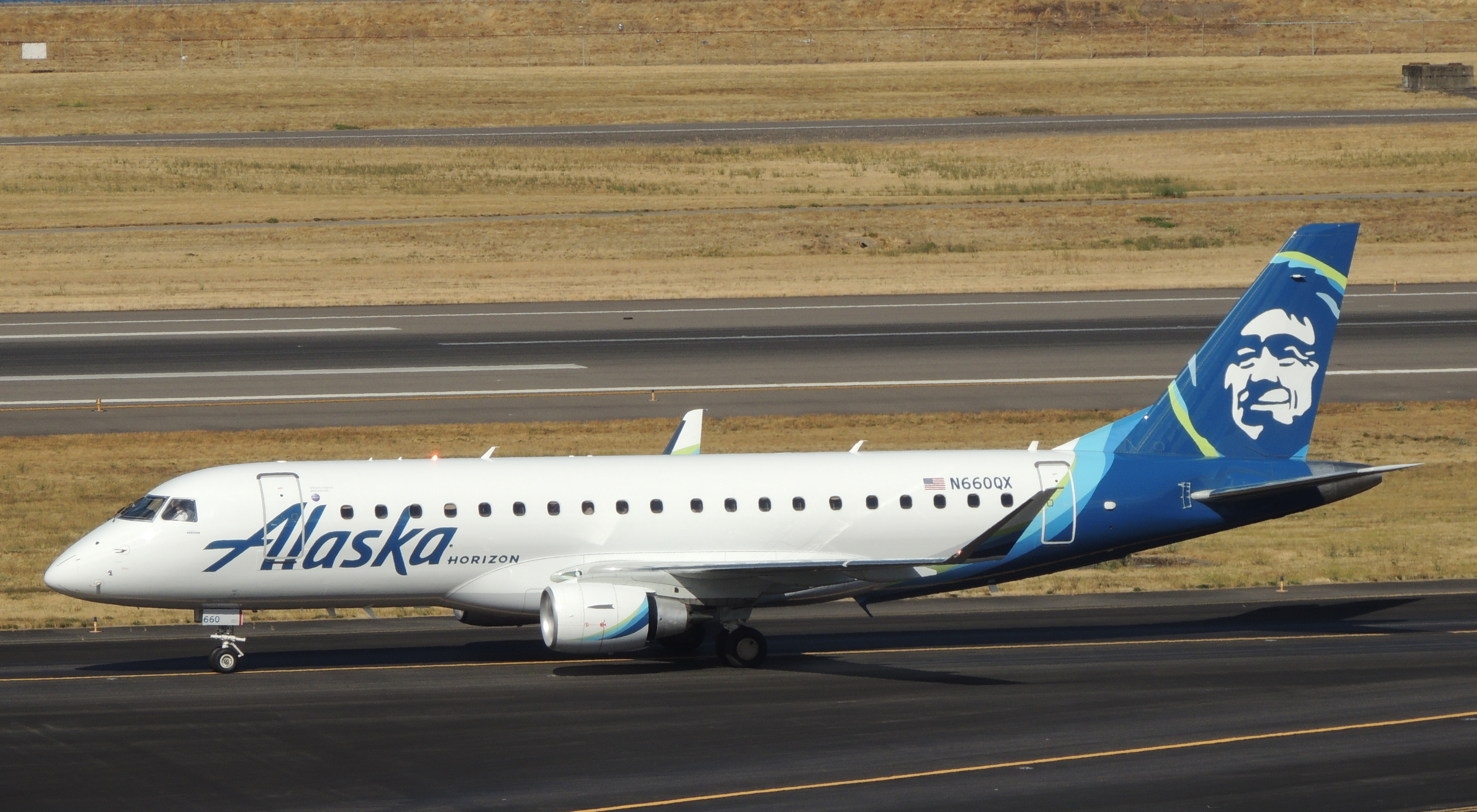
- N660QX, the aircraft involved, seen in September 2023

Incident
- Date: October 22, 2023
- Summary: Attempted suicide, subsequent emergency landing
- Site: In-air; near Portland, Oregon, United States

Aircraft
- Aircraft type: Embraer E175LR
- Operator: Horizon Air on behalf of Alaska Airlines
- IATA flight No.: QX2059
- ICAO flight No.: QXE2059
- Call sign: HORIZON AIR 2059
- Registration: N660QX
- Flight origin: Paine Field, Everett, Washington, United States
- Destination: San Francisco International Airport, San Francisco, United States
- Occupants: 84 (including suspect)
- Passengers: 79
- Crew: 5 (including suspect)
- Fatalities: 0
- Survivors: 84 (including suspect)

Alaska Airlines Flight 2059 was a scheduled domestic flight operated by Horizon Air for Alaska Airlines that was traveling from Paine Field in Everett, Washington, to San Francisco International Airport on October 22, 2023, with 83 people aboard when Joseph David Emerson, an off-duty pilot deadheading in the jump seat of the cockpit, attempted to disable the plane's engines. The Embraer E175 aircraft was operating at 31,000 feet (9,400 m) when Emerson attempted to activate the emergency fire suppression systems on both engines, which would have cut the fuel supply and caused a flameout.

According to court affidavits, Emerson later told investigators that he had not slept in 40 hours, had been depressed, had just suffered through the death of his best friend, and had tried psychedelic mushrooms for the first time to assuage his grief just 48 hours earlier. Believing that he "was dreaming" and wanting to awaken, he pulled both of the fire suppression system handles. The crew reset the systems, removed Emerson from the cockpit, and diverted to Portland International Airport in Oregon, where Emerson was arrested. He was later charged with 83 counts of attempted murder and other charges. He was released back to his California home on December 7, 2023, after posting a $50,000 bond.

== Incident ==
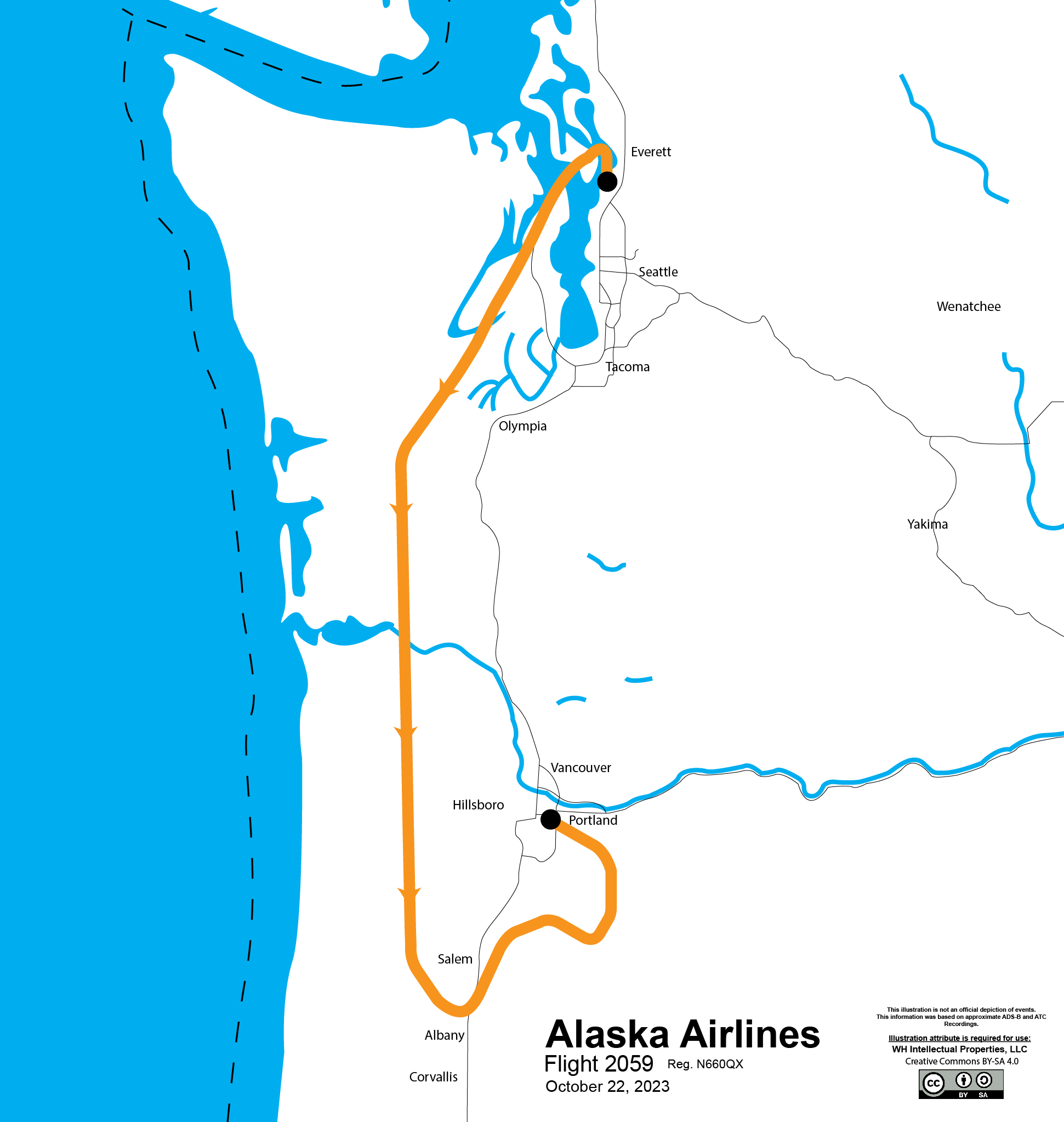
Flight path illustration of Alaska Airlines Flight 2059.

Flight 2059 took off from Paine Field in Everett, Washington, on October 22, 2023, and was traveling to San Francisco International Airport. The flight was operated by Horizon Air, a regional airline, owned by Alaska Air Group, the parent company of Alaska Airlines, who marketed and sold the seats on the flight. The aircraft carried 79 passengers along with five crew members: the captain and first officer on the flight deck, two flight attendants in the cabin, and an off-duty Alaska Airlines pilot, Joseph David Emerson, who was deadheading, sitting in the jump seat of the flight deck.

As the aircraft was flying south near Portland, Oregon, Emerson reportedly exclaimed "I'm not OK" and pulled the two "T-handle" controls that engage the fire suppression system for the aircraft's engines. If a handle is fully deployed, it shuts down the engine by closing a valve to shut off fuel flow to the engine before discharging a firefighting agent. In a statement, Alaska Airlines said the crew was able to quickly reset the handles, ensuring engine power was not lost. After being told to leave the cockpit, Emerson walked calmly to the back of the plane and told a flight attendant, "You need to cuff me right now or it's going to be bad," the affidavit said. Flight attendants put Emerson in wrist restraints. Another flight attendant heard him saying, "I messed everything up" and "I tried to kill everybody." Shortly after the incident took place, while the plane was still in the air, one of the flight's pilots told air traffic control, "We've got the guy that tried to shut the engines down out of the cockpit, and he doesn't sound like he's causing any issues in the back right now."

The flight was diverted to Portland International Airport. As the plane descended, Emerson allegedly "tried to grab the handle of an emergency exit" but was stopped by a flight attendant, prosecutors said. According to the Federal Bureau of Investigation, no injuries occurred during the incident.

After Emerson was taken into custody, the passengers boarded another Horizon Air E175 to San Francisco. The plane involved in the incident returned to service the next day.

== Suspect ==
Emerson was 44 years old at the time. He had been born in Washington State and lived in Pleasant Hill, California, since 2008. He has a wife and two sons.

Emerson was a first officer for Horizon Air (part of the Alaska Air Group) from August 2001 until he moved to Virgin America in June 2012. He became an Alaska Airlines first officer following Alaska Air Group's acquisition of Virgin America in 2016. He was promoted to captain in 2019.

== Aftermath ==
Emerson was charged with 83 counts of attempted murder and 83 counts of reckless endangerment. The two counts apply to each of the 83 people on board, excluding Emerson. In addition, Emerson faced one count of endangering an aircraft. The FBI stated that it "can assure the traveling public that there is no continuing threat related to this incident."

In a statement after the incident, Secretary of Transportation Pete Buttigieg stated that he was "grateful for the professional flight crew and air traffic controllers who stepped up to guide this plane safely to Portland. FAA supports law enforcement in their response and will be focused on any safety considerations for the future that emerge from investigations".

According to a probable cause statement filed in Multnomah County Circuit Court and reports from the Federal Bureau of Investigation, Emerson told the Port of Portland Police Department following his arrest that he had been struggling with severe depression for the previous six months, and he started taking magic mushrooms to manage his grief after the death of a friend. Emerson reported last consuming the mushrooms about 48 hours before the flight; according to The New York Times, it was unclear if he was given a drug test after being detained, and an outside expert said that the mushrooms should have been completely out of his system within a day of consumption. According to the complaint, Emerson told investigators that he had started feeling unwell before the incident, and during the flight feared that "the pilots weren't paying attention." He declared, “I pulled both emergency shut off handles because I thought I was dreaming and I just wanna wake up."

In December 2023, a grand jury indicted Emerson with 83 counts of reckless endangerment and one count of endangering aircraft. The grand jury did not indict Emerson with attempted murder. According to a spokesperson for the Multnomah County District Attorney's Office, this was likely because the jury did not believe Emerson acted with intent to murder. On December 7, 2023, Emerson was released from Multnomah County custody and drove back to San Francisco after posting a $50,000 bond.

A 2025 New York Times article about pilot struggles with mental health included information about the flight and an interview with Emerson about the events leading up to the incident.

A series of continuances delayed the start of Emerson's trial, the last of which was approved by Magistrate Judge Stacie F. Beckerman in May 2025. On September 5, 2025, Multnomah County Circuit Court Judge Cheryl Albrecht ultimately sentenced Emerson to 50 days in jail, with credit for time served; 664 hours of community service, 8 hours for each life he endangered; and five years probation. In the federal case, Emerson was sentenced on November 17, 2025, to time served as well as 3 years of supervised release. He was ordered to pay $60,000 in restitution, mainly to Alaska Air Group.

The documentary The New York Times Presents: Lie to Fly explores Emerson's case and mental health rule reform in the FAA.

== See also ==
- Federal Express Flight 705, an example of an unsuccessful hijacking attempt by an off-duty crew member in the jump seat.
- Germanwings Flight 9525, the suicide by a co-pilot resulting in the deaths of 150 people
