= Event data recorder =

Device in some automobiles to record accident information

An event data recorder (EDR) (or motor vehicle event data recorder (MVEDR) or black box), is a device installed in some automobiles to record information related to traffic collisions. In the USA, EDRs must meet federal standards, as described within the U.S. Code of Federal Regulations.

The term generally refers to a simple, tamper-proof, read-write memory device. The role of the EDR is limited compared to journey data recorders such as digital tachographs in Europe or electronic logging device in the USA, which may also be referred to as a black box or in-vehicle data recorder.

In modern diesel trucks, EDRs are triggered by electronically sensed problems in the engine (often called faults), or a sudden change in wheel speed. One or more of these conditions may occur because of an accident. Information from these devices can be collected after a crash and analyzed to help determine what the vehicles were doing before, during and after the crash or event.

== History ==
In its efforts to establish the uniform scientific crash data needed to make vehicle and highway transportation safer and reduce fatalities, the IEEE launched IEEE 1616 in 2004. It was the first universal standard for MVEDRs, much like those that monitor crashes on aircraft and trains.

The new standard specifies minimal performance characteristics for onboard tamper- and crash-proof memory devices for all types and classes of highway and roadway vehicles. This international protocol will help manufacturers develop what is commonly called "black boxes" for autos, trucks, buses, ambulances, fire trucks and other vehicles. It includes a data dictionary of 86 data elements and covers device survivability.

Since 2006, the US has prescribed what data must be recorded in event data recorders, if a vehicle has an event data recorder, in American regulation 49 CFR 563 (which became effective September 1st, 2012).

Since between 2008 and 2019, Korea has fitted vehicles with event data recorders, according to Korean regulation KMVSS Art. 56-2 (MOLIT Ord. 534/2018).

Since between 2008 and 2015, Japan has fitted vehicles with event data recorders, according to Japanese regulation J-EDR (Kokujigi 278/2008), for passenger cars.

Since between 2012 and 2015 Switzerland has fitted vehicles with event data recorders, according to regulation VTS Art. 102, applicable to vehicles with blue lights and sirens.

Since between 2003 and 2005, Uruguay has fitted vehicles with event data recorders, according to Decree 560/003 Art. 11, for dangerous goods vehicles.

China has drafted a regulation which would become mandatory for all passenger cars as of January 2021.

In March 2021, the new UN Regulation 160 on Event Data Recorders is adopted by the World Forum for Harmonization of Vehicle Regulations.

In the EU, UN Regulation 160 became effective March 22nd, 2022. This made EDRs mandatory for light/passenger vehicles. "EU UN 160 regulation". The EU utilises UN regulation 169 for heavy-duty vehicle EDR standardisation, which was made effective in June of 2024. Mandatory compliance dates are projected as follows:

- January 7th, 2026: Mandatory for new vehicle types of the M2, M3, N2, N3 categories.
- January 7th, 2029 (target): Mandatory for all new registrations within these categories.

== Regulatory framework ==
In the US 49/563.5 regulatory framework, Event data recorder is defined as a

a device or function in a vehicle that records the vehicle's dynamic time-series data during the time period just prior to a crash event (e.g., vehicle speed vs. time) or during a crash event (e.g., delta-V vs. time), intended for retrieval after the crash event. For the purposes of this definition, the event data do not include audio and video data.

In an EU parliament text adopted in 2019, event data recorder requirements assume:

the data that they are capable of recording and storing with respect of the period shortly before, during and immediately after a collision shall include the vehicle's speed, braking, position and tilt of the vehicle on the road, the state and rate of activation of all its safety systems, 112-based eCall in-vehicle system, brake activation and relevant input parameters of the on-board active safety and accident avoidance systems, with high level of accuracy and ensured survivability of data

Since 6 July 2022 EDR regulation is applicable to new car models sold in the European Union and in the European economic area but this move has been met with criticism as this standard is not stringent enough.

=== Technical regulations ===
In 2020, talks were ongoing to draft and define global and/or UNECE vehicle regulation for event data recorder. In March 2021, regulation 160 was adopted.

European UN regulations include regulation 160 for cars (M1 and N1 categories) and regulation 169 for heavy vehicles (M2, M3, N2 and N3categories) · .

== Operation ==
Some EDRs continuously record data, overwriting the previous few minutes until a crash stops them, and others are activated by crash-like events (such as sudden changes in velocity) and may continue to record until the accident is over, or until the recording time is expired. EDRs may record a wide range of data elements, potentially including whether the brakes were applied, the speed at the time of impact, the steering angle, and whether seat belt circuits were shown as "Buckled" or "Unbuckled" at the time of the crash. Current EDRs store the information internally on an EEPROM until recovered from the module. Some vehicles have communications systems (such as GM's OnStar system) that may transmit some data, such as an alert that the airbags have been deployed or location data if remote territory is entered.

Most EDRs in automobiles and light trucks are part of the restraint system control module, which senses impact accelerations and determines what restraints (airbags and/or seatbelt tensioners) to deploy. After the deployment (or non-deployment) decisions are made, and if there is still power available, the data are written to memory. Data downloaded from older EDRs usually contain 6 to 8 pages of information, though many newer systems include a lot more data elements and require more pages, depending on the make/model/year of the vehicle being evaluated. Depending on the type of EDR, it may contain either a deployment file, a non-deployment file or both, depending on the circumstances of the collisions and the time interval between them, among other things.

It is also possible that no data can be recovered from a data recorder. One situation where this might occur is a catastrophic loss of electrical power early in a collision event. In this situation, the power reserve in the restraint system control module capacitors may be completely spent by the deployment of the air bags, leaving insufficient power to write data to the EEPROM. There are other circumstances where a module may fail to record a data file as well.

Most EDRs in heavy trucks are part of the engine electronic control module (ECM), which controls fuel injection timing and other functions in modern heavy-duty diesel engines. The EDR functions are different for different engine manufacturers, but most recognize engine events such as sudden stops, low oil pressure, or coolant loss. Detroit Diesel, Caterpillar Inc., Mercedes-Benz, Mack Trucks, and Cummins engines are among those that may contain this function. When a fault-related event occurs, the data is written to memory. When an event triggered by a reduction in wheel speed is sensed, the data that is written to memory can include almost two minutes of data about vehicle speed, brake application, clutch application, and cruise control status. The data can be downloaded later using the computer software and cables for the specific engine involved. These software tools often allow monitoring of the driver's hours of service, fuel economy, idle time, average travel speeds, and other information related to the maintenance and operation of the vehicle.

Some EDRs only keep track of the car's speed along its length and not the speed going sideways. Analysts generally look at the momentum, energy, and crush damage, and then compare their speed estimates to the number coming out of the EDR to create a complete view of the accident.

There are many different patents related to various types of EDR features.

== Data from the Eaton VORAD Collision Warning System ==
The Eaton Vehicle Onboard Radar (VORAD) Collision Warning System is used by many commercial trucking firms to aid drivers and improve safety. The system includes forward and side radar sensors to detect the presence, proximity and movements of vehicles around the truck to then alert the truck driver. When sensors determine that the truck is closing on a vehicle ahead too quickly or that a nearby vehicle is potentially hazardous, the VORAD system gives the driver both a visual and audible warning. The VORAD system also monitors various parameters of the truck including vehicle speed and turn rate plus the status of vehicle systems and controls. The monitored data is captured and recorded by the VORAD system. This monitored data can be extracted and analyzed in the event of an accident. The recorded data can be used by accident investigators and forensic engineers to show the movement and speed of the host vehicle plus the position and speeds of other vehicles prior to the incident. In accident reconstruction, the VORAD system is a step above the EDR systems in that VORAD monitors other vehicles relative to the host vehicle, while EDR's only record data about the host vehicle.

== Usage ==
Event data recorders were introduced to American open-wheel championship CART in the 1993 season, and the Formula One World Championship in 1997. Data collected by the recorders was used to improve safety and design factors in race vehicles and racetracks.

EDRs are not mandated on new vehicles, however, if they are installed, they must meet US DOT requirements governing the data they collect. As of 2004, an estimated 40 million passenger vehicles are equipped with the devices.

In the UK many police and emergency service vehicles are fitted with a more accurate and detailed version that is produced by one of several independent companies. Both the Metropolitan police and the City of London police are long-term users of EDRs and have used the data recovered after an incident to convict both police officers and members of the public.

== Accessing recorded information ==
=== Methods of access ===
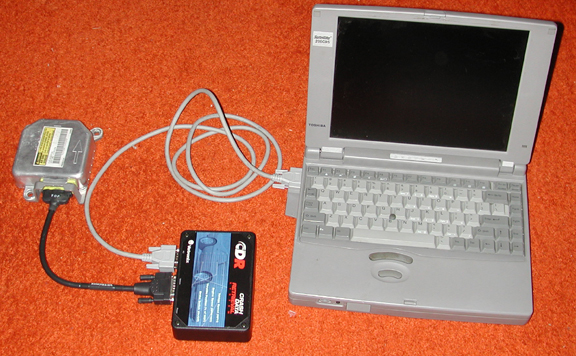
Conducting a bench download

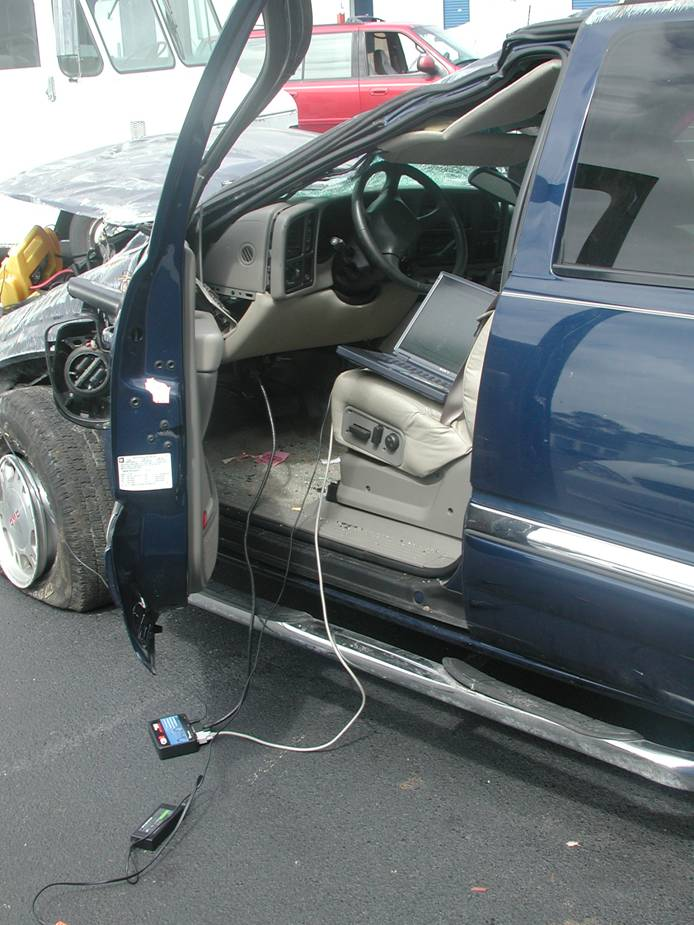
Downloading a module via the DLC

Downloading an airbag module in most vehicles is best accomplished by connecting the appropriate scanning tool to the Diagnostic Link Connector (DLC) usually found under the vehicle's dashboard near the driver's knees. Alternately, some modules can be downloaded "on the bench" after removal from the vehicle.

=== The Bosch CDR tool ===
Over 88% of model year 2016 and newer vehicles are supported by the Bosch CDR tool, enabling the retrieval of event data recorder (EDR) data from a vehicle that has been involved in a crash. This tool is made up of hardware and software which provides the ability to "image", "download", or "retrieve" EDR data that may be stored in the control modules of passenger cars, light trucks and SUVs. The software component is a single, standalone program designed to run in a Windows environment. The hardware part of the Tool is a collection of components including cables and adapters which, with proper training and minimal difficulty, are used to "retrieve" data from supported vehicles.

=== Subaru, Kia, and Hyundai tools ===
Another 11% of model year 2016 and newer vehicles are supported by other EDR tools. The limited need to cover less commonly supported vehicles may make the initial investment in software and equipment unnecessary for many in the accident reconstruction or related industries.

== NHTSA ruling ==
From 1998 to 2001, the National Highway Traffic Safety Administration (NHTSA) sponsored a working group specifically tasked with the study of EDRs. After years of evaluation, NHTSA released a formal Notice of Proposed Rulemaking in 2004. This notice declared NHTSA's intent to standardize EDRs. It was not until August 2006 that NHTSA released its final ruling (49 CFR Part 563). The ruling was lengthy (207 pages), consisting of not only definitions and mandatory EDR standards, but also acted as a formal reply to the dozens of petitions received by NHTSA after the 2004 notice.

Since there was already an overwhelming trend for voluntary EDR installation, the ruling did not require manufacturers to install EDRs in vehicles produced for North America. Based on its analysis, NHTSA estimated that by 2010, over 85% of vehicles would already have EDRs installed in them, but warned that if the trend did not continue, the agency would revisit their decision and possibly make installation a requirement.

The mandate did, however, provide a minimum standard for the type of data that EDRs would be required to record, consisting of at least 15 types of crash data, including pre-crash speed, engine throttle, brake use, measured changes in forward velocity (Delta-V), driver safety belt use, airbag warning lamp status and airbag deployment times.

In addition to the required data, NHTSA also set standards for 30 other types of data to be recorded if EDRs were voluntarily configured. For example, if a manufacturer configured an EDR to record engine RPMs or ABS activity, then the EDR would have to record 5 seconds of those pre-crash data in half-second increments.

Besides the requirement that all data be able to survive a 30 mph barrier crash and be measured with defined precision, NHTSA also required that all manufacturers make their EDR data publicly available. As of October 2009, only General Motors, Ford and Daimler Chrysler had released their EDR data to be publicly read. In the August 2006 ruling, NHTSA set a timetable for all vehicle manufacturers to be in compliance with the new EDR standards. The compliance date was originally set for all vehicles manufactured after September 1, 2010. But in 2008, NHTSA pushed the date back to September 1, 2012. In 2014, it was working on another rule update to give vehicle manufacturers until September 1, 2014, but that rule was never issued.

== EDR Needs for ADAS ==
In 2020, an NTSB communication revealed that an ADAS system could collect information useful for crash analysis and risk assessment, but that federal regulators failed to standardize it.

Some regulators though, consider Event Data Recorder (EDR) to be a feature for the conventional vehicle, & that an automated vehicle should instead have Data Storage System for Automated Driving (DSSAD). The EDR aims to analyze accidents, while the DSSAD should be used for research, monitoring, liability, & legal responsibility.

== Purported Use and Privacy Concerns ==
Some forensic studies are underway regarding rules and regulations and warn automakers and crash investigators of privacy concerns and unintended use of retrieved EDR data.

Beginning in the late 90s light vehicle manufacturers included electronic data recorders (EDR) in most vehicles; they were commonly referred to as 'Black Boxes'.

Despite alerts and warnings in the owner's manual, many drivers are not aware of their vehicle's recording capability. Global civil liberty and privacy groups have raised concerns about the implications of data recorders 'spying' on car users, particularly as the issue of 'who owns the data' has not yet been fully resolved ubiquitously, and there has been some controversy over the use of recorded data as evidence in court cases (see next section) and for insurance claims against the driver of a crashed vehicle. But the use of EDR data in civil and criminal court cases is on the rise as they become more accepted as a source of reliable empirical evidence in accident reconstruction.

In the United States, at least 17 states have statutes specific to EDRs. Generally, these state statutes restrict access to the EDR or limit the use of recovered EDR information.

The U.S. federal Driver Privacy Act of 2015 was enacted on December 4, 2015. It stated that the owner or lessee of a motor vehicle is the owner of the data collected by the EDR. In order to access that data, an investigator would need to (1) be authorized by a court or judicial or administrative authority, subject to the standards for admission into evidence; (2) obtain the written, electronic or recorded audio consent of the vehicle owner or lessee; (3) be conducting an investigation or inspection authorized by federal law; (4) demonstrate it is necessary to facilitate medical care in response to a car accident; or (5) be conducting traffic safety research, so long as the personal information of the owner/lessee is not disclosed.

In Canada, it is considered that there is no expectation of privacy since the information contained in the EDR did not contain "intimate details of the driver’s biological core … that could be said to directly compromise his dignity, integrity, and autonomy.".

== EDR as Courtroom Evidence ==
There have been a number of trials worldwide involving EDRs. Drivers have been convicted and exonerated as a result of EDR evidence; following are a few noteworthy examples, though all of the former.

=== N.J. Governor Jon Corzine ===
On 12 April 2007, N.J. Governor Jon Corzine was seriously injured in an automobile accident. According to the superintendent of state police, an event data recorder in the SUV he was traveling in recorded he was traveling at about 91 mph five seconds before the crash. The speed limit on the road is 65 mph. The Governor was not the driver of the vehicle.

=== Mass. Lt. Governor Tim Murray ===
On November 2, 2011, Mass. Lt. Governor Tim Murray crashed a government-owned vehicle on a stretch of Interstate 190. Initially, police investigating did not issue any citations. Murray initially claimed he simply lost control on the ice, wasn't speeding, was wearing a seat belt and braked. But those claims were all later disproven when the Crown Victoria black box data recorder information was released. The data revealed the car was traveling 108 miles per hour, accelerated, and the Lt. Governor was not wearing a seat belt at the time the vehicle collided with a rock ledge and flipped over. Murray was unhurt in the accident.

=== Antonio Boparan-Singh ===
The first such use of EDR evidence in the United Kingdom was at Birmingham Crown Court during the trial of Antonio Boparan-Singh who crashed the Range Rover Sport he was driving into a Jeep in 2006. The accident left a baby girl paralyzed and the driver, who was aged 19 at the time of the incident, was sentenced to 21 months in prison. The EDR evidence allowed investigators to determine the driver was speeding at 72 mph in a 30 mph zone.

=== Others ===
- In New South Wales, Australia, a teen-aged female (a probationary driver) was convicted of dangerous driving "causing death/occasioning grievous bodily harm" in 2005. Evidence from the Peugeot's EDR showed that the car was being driven in excess of the posted speed limit. An injunction against the use of EDR evidence, obtained by the owner of the car (the parents of the defendant), was overturned in the NSW Supreme Court.
- In Quebec, Canada, the driver of a car who sped through a red light, crashing into another car at the intersection and killing the other driver, was convicted of "dangerous driving" in 2001 after EDR information revealed that it was he, not the deceased driver of the other car (as the defendant asserted), who was speeding. There were no other witnesses to the crash.

Although EDR evidence can be valuable in the litigation of traffic-related accidents and incidents, the primary purpose of an EDR is to improve driver safety and not to provide data for accident reconstruction, and courts should consider the limitations of EDR data in determining the cause of traffic accidents.

In Canada, usage of such data in court might be considered as an error, without proper evidentiary foundation establishing its reliability, as with the crash data retrieval software (CDR) that interpreted the EDR.

== Video Event Data Recorder ==
A Video Event Data Recorder (VEDR), more commonly known as a 'Dashcam', is a device that records video in a vehicle to create a record of accidents and for evaluating driver and vehicle performance.

== In Europe ==
In Europe, M1 vehicles have an airbag control module which is linked to an EDR. It might record 49 CFR Part 563, data and more.

Ownership of EDR data in Europe is not clearly defined like in the US.

When an EDR is considered as a record of less than 30 seconds, an EDR is different from other in-vehicle data recorders such as driver or journey monitoring devices. However, some retrofit systems, in the fleet and insurance markets, might include both driver/journey monitoring and EDR functionality.

Accident data recorder demonstrates that EDR has a safety benefit.

EU EDR will become mandatory on new cars in Europe, when it is not in the US.

EU EDR will store more parameters than its US counterpart.

In Europe, EDR should be subject to UNECE regulation 160.

The Event Data Recorder (EDR) is one of the systems to become mandatory in mid-2022 for new types of passenger cars and vans under the revised General Vehicle Safety Regulation 2019/2144. It will help to obtain more accurate and complete accidentology data to be used for accident research and analysis.

Since 6 July 2022 EDR regulation is applicable to new car models sold in the European Union and in the European economic area but criticism exist as this standard is not enough stringent.

Compared to UN regulation 160, EU adds requirements related to data retrieval, privacy and security of data.

== See also ==
- Accident Data Recorder
- Black Box
- Data Logger
- ECall
- Forensic Engineering
- Tachograph
- Vehicular Accident Reconstruction
