= Traffic collision reconstruction =

Process for investigating vehicle collisions

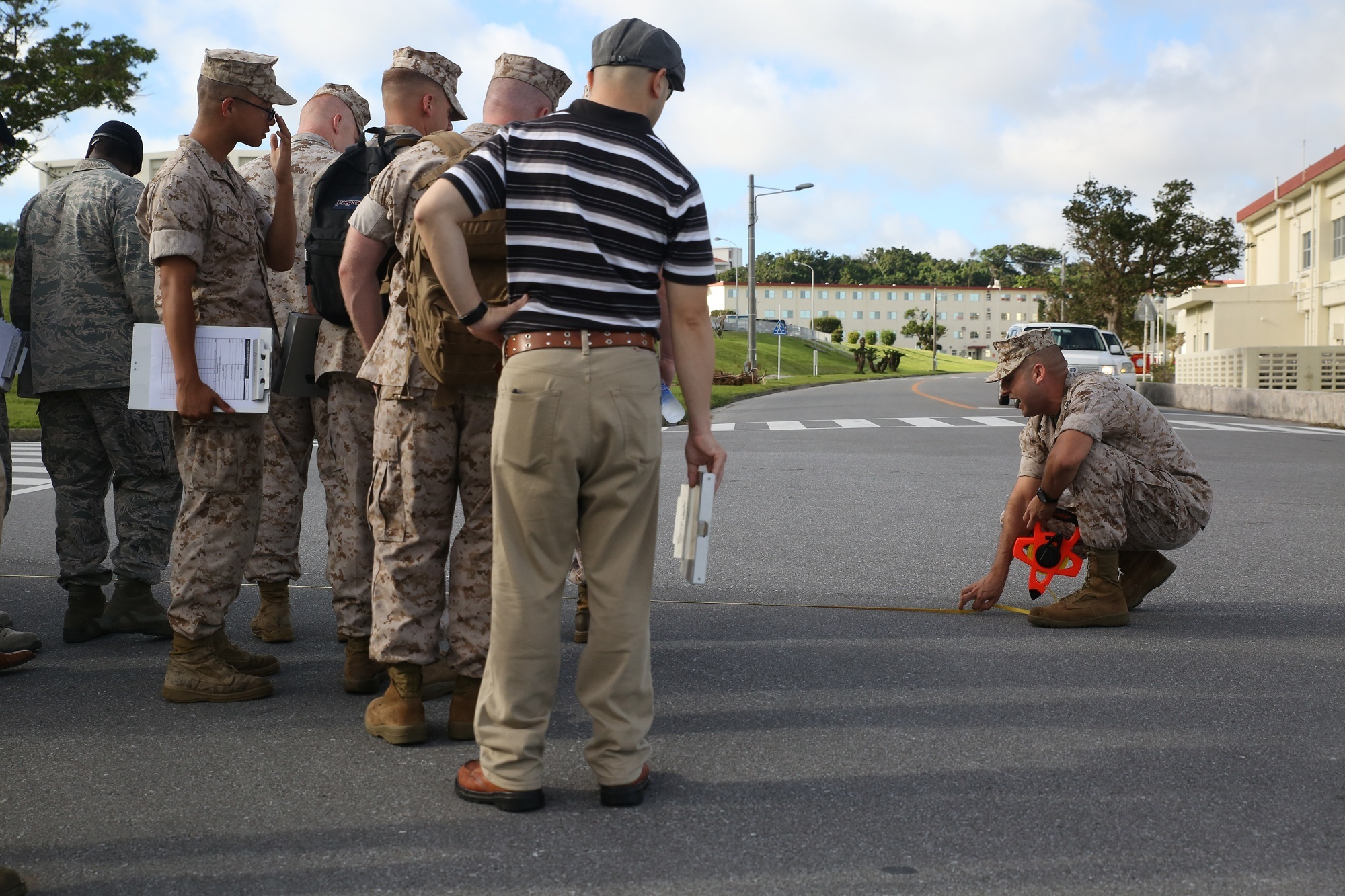
Roadside investigative training exercise

Traffic collision reconstruction is the process of investigating, analyzing, and drawing conclusions about the causes and events during a vehicle collision. Reconstructionists conduct collision analysis and reconstruction to identify the cause of a collision and contributing factors including the role of the driver(s), vehicle(s), roadway and general environment. Physics and engineering principles are the basis for these analyses and may involve the use of software for calculations and simulations. Collision reconstruction is sometimes used as the basis of expert witness testimony at trials. Collision reconstructions are performed in cases involving fatalities or personal injury. Results from collision reconstructions are also sometimes used for making roads and highways safer, as well as improving safety aspects of motor vehicle designs. Reconstructions are typically conducted by forensic engineers, specialized units in law enforcement agencies, or private consultants.

== History ==
Crash analysis dates back to shortly after the first car crashed. The field got more analytical in the 1930s and in 1940 there was the first judicial opinion accepting the analysis of speed through measuring skid length and using that information with the principle of Conservation of Energy. NY State City Magistrate Horn, 20 N.Y.S. (92nd) 149 (1940) 174 N.Y. Misc 235.

The National Highway Traffic Safety Administration funded the first national guidelines for the standardization training in the field of traffic collision reconstruction in 1985. This led to the establishment of "Accreditation Commission for Traffic Accident Reconstruction" (ACTAR), an industry accreditation group.

The field of motorcycle collision research was pioneered by Hugh H. Hurt Jr. His reconstructions of motorcycle collisions helped to explain that proper helmets reduced head injuries, most motorcyclists needed more driver training to control skids, and a large percentage of motorcycle collisions involved left-turning automobiles turning in front of the oncoming motorcycle.

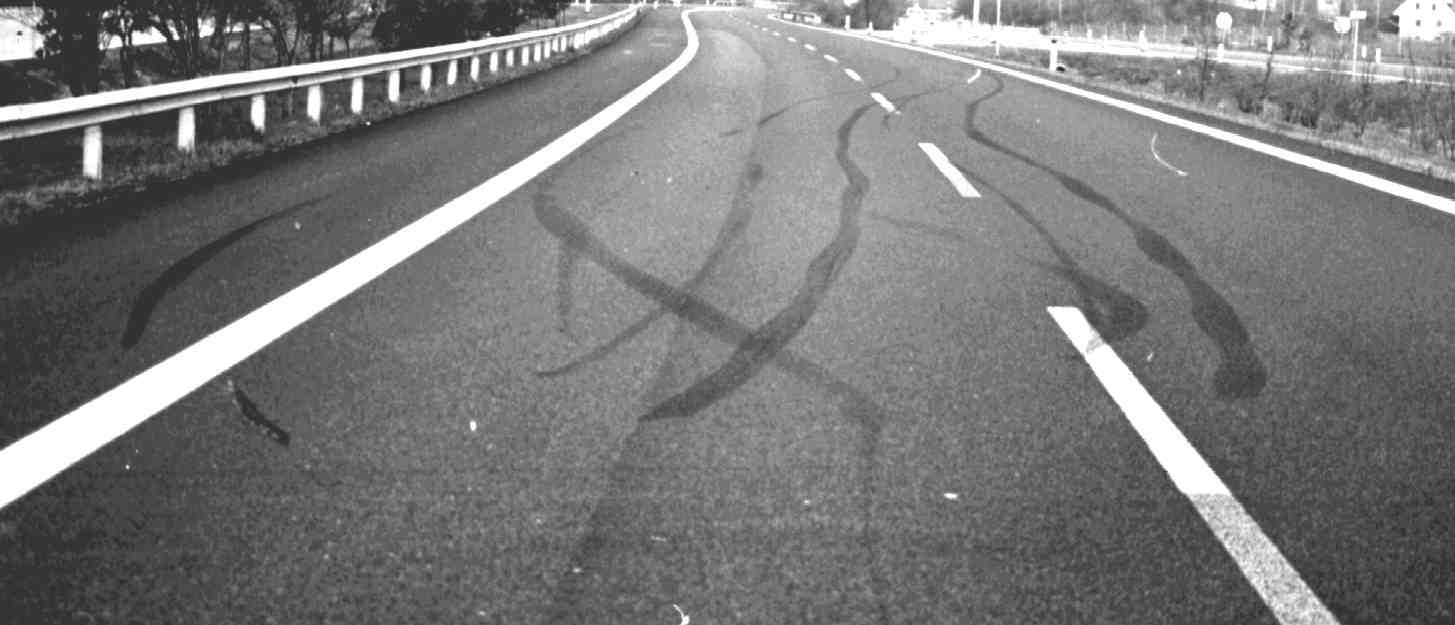
Skid marks on an asphalt road.

== Investigation ==
Scene inspections and data recovery involves visiting the scene of the collision and investigating all of the vehicles involved in the collision. Investigations involve collecting evidence such as scene photographs, video of the collision, measurements of the scene, eyewitness testimony, and legal depositions. Additional factors include steering angles, braking, use of lights, turn signals, speed, acceleration, engine rpm, cruise control, and anti-lock brakes. Witnesses are interviewed during collision reconstruction, and physical evidence such as tire marks are examined. The length of a skid mark can often allow calculation of the original speed of a vehicle for example. Vehicle speeds are frequently underestimated by a driver, so an independent estimate of speed is often essential in collisions. Inspection of the road surface is also vital, especially when traction has been lost due to black ice, diesel fuel contamination, or obstacles such as road debris. Data from an event data recorder also provides valuable information such as the speed of the vehicle a few seconds before the collision.

As part of the investigation of a vehicle collision, an investigator typically documents evidence at the collision site and the damage to the vehicles. The use of 3-dimensional laser scanning has become a common method for documentation. The product of scanning is a 3D point cloud that can be used to take measurements and create computer models used in the analysis of the collision. The 3D data can be incorporated into many of the computer simulation programs used in collision reconstruction. The 3D point clouds and models can also be used for creating visuals to illustrate the analysis and to show views of witnesses and the involved drivers.

== Technology ==
Many new vehicles are equipped with onboard "Crash Data Recorders or Event Data Recorders" (CDR or EDR). The Bosch CDR-Tool is a commercially available tool allowing the investigator to image (download) crash data directly from a supported vehicle. The CDR-Tool software generates a report of recorded data parameters leading up to the crash, as well as recording the crash pulse (accelerations and or speed change, also known as delta-V). Some of the recorded pre-crash parameters include vehicle speed, brake status (ON/OFF), throttle position (%), ignition cycles, seat belt status, wheel speeds, steering wheel position (degrees), ABS operation, and others.

Tesla, Hyundai, and Kia as well as most heavy commercial vehicles are equipped with some sort of event recording, but are not supported by the Bosch CDR-Tool equipment. To access information in these other vehicles, a diagnostic retrieval tool unique to each manufacturer is required.

== Analysis ==
Vehicular collision reconstruction analysis includes processing data collecting, evaluating possible hypotheses, creating models, recreating collisions, testing, and utilizing software simulations. Like many other technical activities, collision reconstruction has been revolutionized by the use of powerful, inexpensive computers and specialty software. Various types of collision reconstruction software are used to recreate crash and crime scenes and to perform other useful tasks involved in reconstructing collisions. Collision reconstruction software is regularly used by law enforcement personnel and consultants to analyze a collision and to demonstrate what occurred in a collision. Examples of types of software used by collision reconstructionists are CAD (computer aided drawing) programs, vehicle specification databases, momentum and energy analysis programs, collision simulators, and photogrammetry software.

== Presentation ==
After the analysis is completed, forensic engineers compile report findings, diagrams, and animations to form their expert testimony and conclusions relating to the collision. Forensic animation typically depicts all or part of a collision sequence in a video format so that non-technical parties, such as juries, can easily understand the expert's opinions regarding that event. To be physically realistic, an animation needs to be created by someone with a knowledge of physics, dynamics and engineering. When animations are used in a courtroom setting, they should be carefully scrutinized. Animation software can be easily misused, because motions which are not physically possible can be displayed. A reliable animation must be based on physical evidence and calculations which embody the laws of physics, and the animation should only be used to demonstrate in a visual fashion the underlying calculations made by the expert analyzing the case.

== Motorcycle collision reconstruction ==
Motorcycle collision reconstruction is similar to other collision reconstruction techniques and relies on the same basic principles of conservation of energy and momentum as automobile collision reconstruction plus adds the specifics of motorcycle dynamics and rider control. Proper reconstruction of a motorcycle collision requires detailed knowledge of motorcycle dynamics plus knowledge of how motorcycles react to rider input.

Motorcycle collision reconstruction follows reverse a chronological order of events, working from the point of rest of the motorcycle and/or rider backwards to a point in time before to the start of the collision sequence to when possible actions could have prevented the crash.

Motorcycle collision reconstruction relies on knowledge of the five phases of a motorcycle collision.

Perception–reaction: This is the phase where the rider perceives a collision hazard and decides on a response. Perception/reaction time is estimated at 1.1 to 1.5 seconds.

Avoidance – braking/steering: In this next phase, the rider typically engages in some type of avoidance using steering or braking using the front brake, rear brake or a combination. Physical evidence at the scene combined with statements from witnesses can give clues as to what type of avoidance occurred.

Pre-impact sliding: During braking, riders may overuse the motorcycle brakes, resulting in locking the front and/or rear wheel. If the front wheel locks, the rider will almost certainly lose control and crash. If the rider loses control and crashes while braking, the motorcycle and rider usually separate and slide in the same trajectory they were moving in before the crash.

Impact: The bike and/or rider may collide with other object like a vehicle or guardrail. Damage caused by impact can be evaluated and combined with sliding distance to help determine the motorcycle's speed during the collision sequence.

Post-impact motion: After impact, additional movement to the point of final rest can occur. The rider frequently separates from the motorcycle and travels independently to the final point of rest. Analysis of post-impact travel distance can also determine speeds associated with the collision.

== Training facilities (North America) ==
The Royal Canadian Mounted Police conducts On-Scene Collision Investigation (Level-2), Advanced Collision Analysis (Level-3), and Forensic Collision Reconstruction (Level-4) as well as Commercial Vehicle Collision and Pedestrian/Bicycle Collision courses at the Pacific Region Training Center (PRTC) located in Chilliwack, British Columbia. These courses are also available to Non-RCMP Police Agencies.

Northwestern University Center for Public Safety conducts Traffic Crash Investigation courses utilized by both law enforcement and public agencies.

The Institute of Police Technology and Management (IPTM) is a recognized institute for Crash Investigation for Law Enforcement as well as professional agencies.

== Law enforcement / police agencies ==
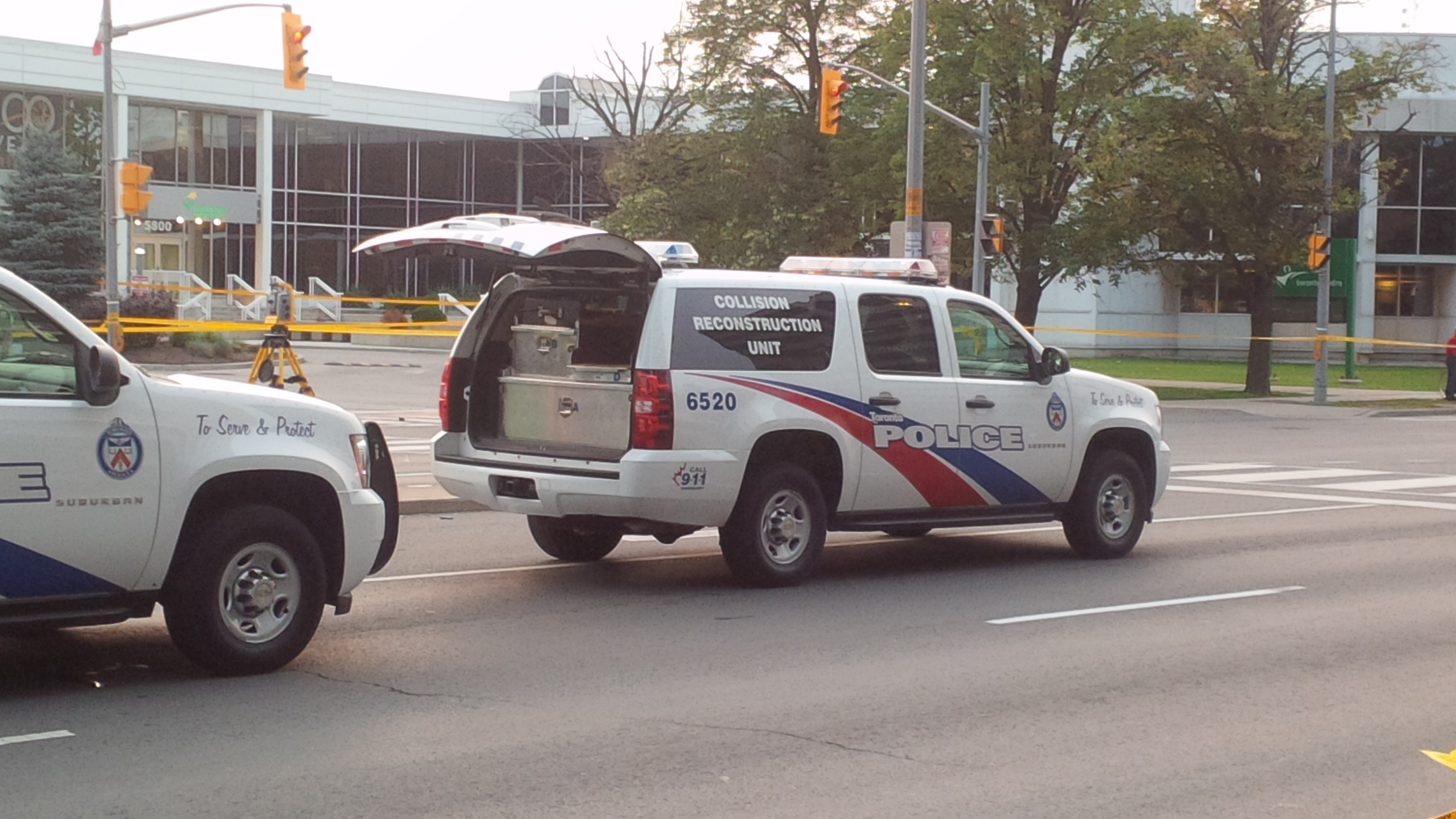
Toronto Police CRU vehicles at the scene of a large accident in North York in 2014

The Royal Canadian Mounted Police utilize full-time Forensic Collision Reconstructionists and Analysts as a service line. In British Columbia, they are referred to as ICARS (Integrated Collision Analysis and Reconstruction Service). ICARS units are located in each RCMP District within the Province of B.C.

California Highway Patrol utilize a team deployment called MAIT ("Multidisciplinary Accident Investigation Team"). Each team consists of inspectors with specialized training in traffic collision reconstruction, traffic engineering, automotive engineering, and vehicle dynamics. MAITs are composed of one CHP sergeant (the team leader), two or more CHP officers, one Motor Carrier Specialist I (MCS I), and one Senior Transportation Engineer from Caltrans.

== See also ==
- Accident data recorder
- Assured clear distance ahead
- Forensic animation
- Forensic engineering
- Human factors
- Skid marks
- Total stopping distance
