= Deadheading (employee) =

Carrying, free of charge, a transport company's own staff

Deadheading is the practice of carrying, free of charge, a transport company's own staff on a normal passenger trip so that they can be in the right place to begin their duties. In United States railway usage, the term may also be used for movement of train crews to or from a train using another means of vehicular transportation, as passenger train service is infrequent or nonexistent in many areas.

== Notable deadheaders ==
- One of the four survivors of Japan Air Lines Flight 123 in August 1985 was a deadheading flight attendant, Yumi Ochiai. She helped administer oxygen to passengers after the plane suffered explosive decompression. She survived because she was wedged between several seats during the crash, protecting her from suffering serious injury.
- In July 1989, United Airlines Flight 232, a McDonnell Douglas DC-10, lost all hydraulic systems and flight controls, an event considered so improbable that no backup flight controls were provided and no emergency procedures had been established for pilots. Retired captain Dennis Edward Fitch, a deadheading DC-10 flight instructor who had investigated how to fly the airliner following a total hydraulic failure following the crash of JAL 123, helped the flight crew guide the aircraft to a semi-controlled emergency landing.
- In April 1994, on FedEx Flight 705, employee Auburn Calloway attempted to hijack the McDonnell-Douglas DC-10 on which he was deadheading with the intent of crashing it to initiate insurance fraud, but was repelled by the combined efforts of the plane's crew.
- A day prior to the Lion Air Flight 610 crash in October 2018, a deadheading pilot during the 737's final successful flight reportedly saved the plane from the same malfunctioning flight control system that caused the crash the next day, killing 189 people. He is said to have been in the cockpit jump seat when the malfunction occurred; he identified the problem and advised the active crew on how to address it.
- In October 2023, on Alaska Airlines Flight 2059, off-duty pilot Joseph David Emerson allegedly attempted to shut down the engines after being given access to the cockpit to ride in the jumpseat. He was removed from the cockpit, the flight was diverted, and he was detained after landing.
- The fraudster Frank Abagnale claims to have deadheaded over 2 million air-miles by pretending to be an airline pilot, although his claims are disputed. Abagnale later admitted that some of his claims were exaggerated.
- The two deadheading pilots on Flydubai Flight 1073, 30 September 2026, who emergency-landed the plane after the first officer stabbed and seriously wounded the captain, in an attempt to crash the airplane.

== See also ==
- Dead mileage, where a vehicle is moved without paying passengers
- United Express Flight 3411 incident, in which police forcibly removed passenger (without arresting) David Dao to make his seat available for a deadheading airline employee.
- Jump seat, an auxiliary seat used on aircraft for non-passengers who are not operating the aircraft
