= Federal Express Flight 705 =

1994 aircraft hijacking over Arkansas

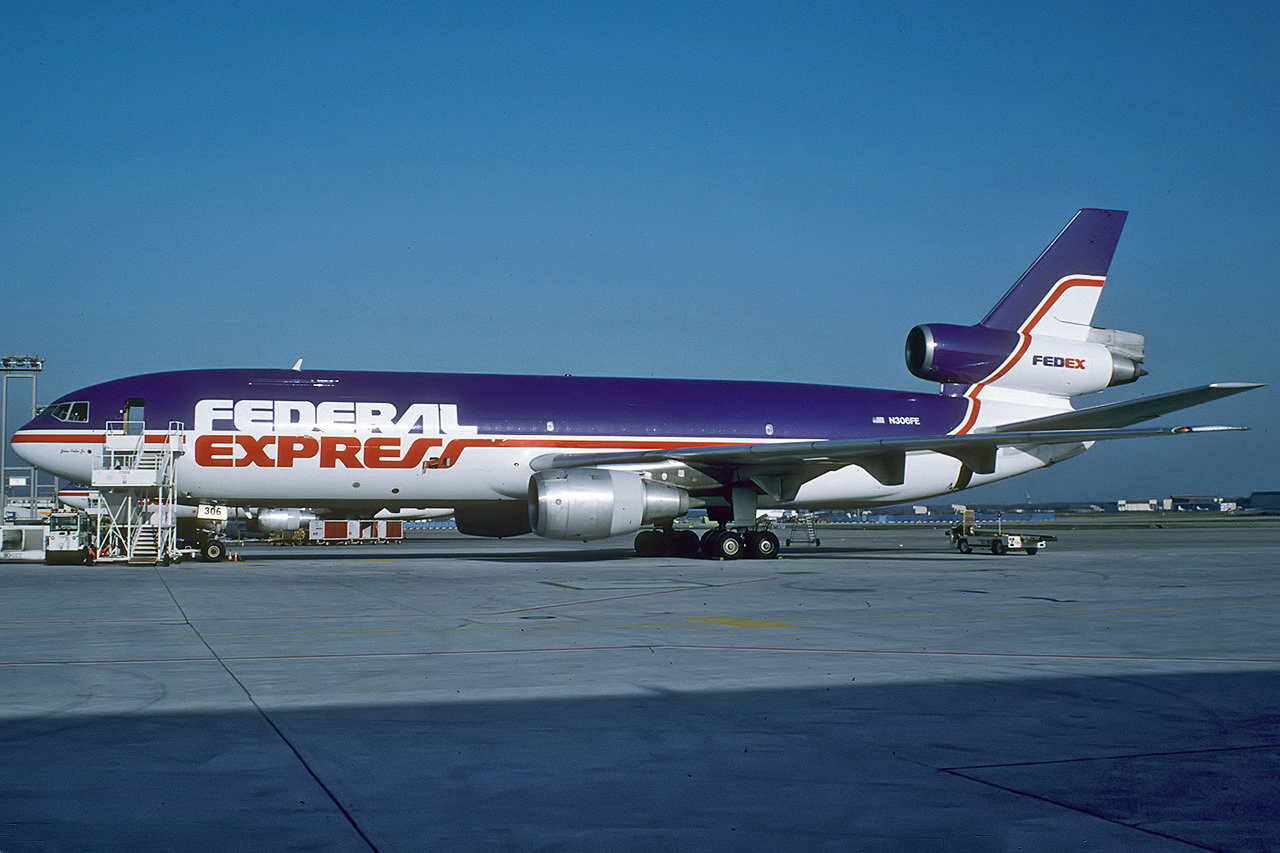
- N306FE, the aircraft involved in the hijacking

Hijacking
- Date: April 7, 1994
- Summary: Attempted suicide hijacking for insurance fraud leading to in-flight brawl, subsequent emergency landing
- Site: In the air over Arkansas

Aircraft
- Aircraft type: McDonnell Douglas DC-10-30F
- Aircraft name: John Peter Jr.
- Operator: Federal Express
- Call sign: EXPRESS 705
- Registration: N306FE
- Flight origin: Memphis International Airport; Memphis, Tennessee, US
- Destination: Norman Y. Mineta San Jose International Airport; San Jose, California, US
- Occupants: 4 (including hijacker)
- Passengers: 1 (hijacker)
- Crew: 3
- Fatalities: 0
- Injuries: 4 (including hijacker)
- Survivors: 4 (including hijacker)

On April 7, 1994, Federal Express Flight 705, a McDonnell Douglas DC-10 cargo jet carrying electronics equipment across the United States from Memphis, Tennessee, to San Jose, California, was the subject of a hijack attempt by Auburn R. Calloway, a Federal Express employee facing possible dismissal for falsifying his flight hours. Calloway boarded the scheduled flight as a deadhead passenger carrying a guitar case concealing several hammers and a speargun. He planned to crash the aircraft hoping he would appear to be an employee killed in an accident, so his family could collect on a $2.5 million life insurance policy provided by Federal Express. Calloway tried to switch off the aircraft's cockpit voice recorder (CVR) before takeoff, but the flight engineer noticed and turned it back on, believing he had neglected to turn it on. Once airborne, Calloway attempted to kill the crew with hammers so their injuries would appear consistent with an accident rather than a hijacking. Despite severe injuries, the crew fought back, subdued Calloway, and landed the aircraft safely.

During his trial, the prosecution argued Calloway was trying to commit murder–suicide. Efforts by the defense team to put forward an insanity defense were ultimately unsuccessful and Calloway was convicted on federal charges of attempted murder and attempted aircraft piracy (Note: In addition, Calloway was also found guilty of interference with flight crew operations; this conviction was later overturned by an appeals court which determined it to be a lesser included offense of attempted air piracy.) and sentenced to life in prison without the possibility of parole.

== Flight crew and hijacker ==
Three flight crew members were in the cockpit on this flight: 49-year-old Captain David G. Sanders (1944–2026), who had worked for FedEx for 20 years and previously served with the U.S. Navy for nine years during the Vietnam War; 42-year-old First Officer James M. Tucker Jr., who had worked for FedEx for 10 years and previously served with the U.S. Navy for 12 years during the Vietnam War and People Express Airlines for three years; and 39-year-old Flight Engineer Andrew H. Peterson, who had worked for FedEx for 5 years. The previous flight crew had gone one minute over their eight-hour flight limit the previous day, so they were replaced by Sanders, Tucker, and Peterson.

Also in the airplane was 42-year-old FedEx flight engineer Auburn R. Calloway, an alumnus of Stanford University and a former Navy pilot and martial-arts expert. Calloway, who was divorced from his wife four years earlier, wanted to ensure that their two children were financially secure enough to attend college. However, Calloway felt that FedEx discriminated against him as an African American by assigning him only as a flight engineer despite being a qualified pilot. Former navy pilots who had worked with Calloway had described him as a "substandard pilot".. Furthermore, he was facing a hearing scheduled the following day for falsifying his flight hours, and believed that dismissal was inevitable, although a colleague who had previously flown with Calloway stated that it was unlikely that FedEx would terminate an employee for such an offense. Boarding as a deadhead passenger, Calloway planned to hijack and crash the plane while disguising it as an accident, so his family would benefit from FedEx's life-insurance policy worth US$2.5 million (equivalent to $5.4 million in 2025). Calloway intended to murder the flight crew using blunt force. To accomplish this, he brought on board two claw hammers, two club hammers, a speargun, and a knife (which was not used) concealed inside a guitar case. He also carried with him a note written to his ex-wife "describing the author's apparent despair". Just before the flight, Calloway had transferred over US$54,000 (equivalent to $117,300 in 2025) in securities and cashier's checks to his ex-wife.

== Flight details ==
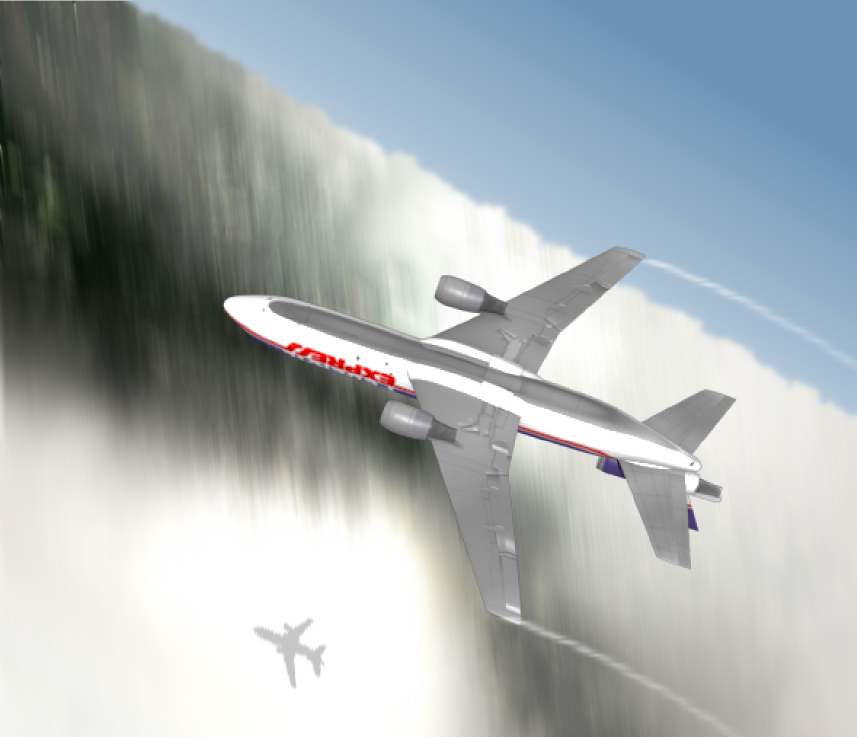
Artist's depiction of the DC-10 during the attempted hijack

Before takeoff, as part of Calloway's plan to disguise the intended attack as an accident, he attempted to disable the cockpit voice recorder (CVR) by pulling its circuit breaker to interrupt power. When the flight crew arrived, they noticed that Calloway's presence in the cockpit was a breach of etiquette for a deadheading passenger, although they did not suspect hostile intent at the time. During the standard preflight checks, Peterson, the flight engineer, noticed the pulled breaker and reset it before takeoff, reactivating the CVR.

About 26 minutes after takeoff, as the plane was passing 19,000 feet (5,791 m), and the flight crew carried on a casual conversation, Calloway went into the back to get his weapons, entered the flight deck, and attacked Peterson, Tucker, and Sanders. All three members of the crew received multiple blows from a hammer. Both Peterson and Tucker, the first officer, suffered fractured skulls, and Peterson's temporal artery was severed. The blow to Tucker's head drilled shards of bone into his brain and temporarily rendered him unable to move or react, but he was still conscious. Captain Sanders reported that during the beginning of the attack, he could not discern any emotion from Calloway, just "simply a face and his eyes".

When Calloway ceased his hammer attack, Peterson and Sanders began to get out of their seats to go after Calloway. Calloway left the cockpit and retrieved his speargun. He came back into the cockpit and threatened everyone to sit back down in their seats. Despite a loud ringing in his ear and being unbalanced and dazed, Peterson grabbed the gun by the spear between the barbs and the barrel. Tucker, an ex-Navy pilot, performed extreme aerial maneuvers with the aircraft as the struggle between Calloway and the other crew members ensued. He pulled the plane into a sudden 15° climb, throwing Sanders, Peterson, and Calloway out of the cockpit and into the galley. To try to throw Calloway off balance, Tucker then turned the plane into a left roll, almost on its side. This rolled the men along the smoke curtain onto the left side of the galley.

Eventually, Tucker rolled the plane almost upside down at 140°, while attempting to maintain a visual reference of the environment around him through the windows. Peterson, Sanders, and Calloway were then pinned to the plane's ceiling. Calloway managed to wrench his hammer hand free and hit Sanders in the head again. Just then, Tucker put the plane into a steep dive. This pushed the men back to the smoke curtain, but the wings and elevators started to flutter. At this point, Tucker could hear the wind rushing against the cockpit windows. At a speed of 460 knots (530 mph; 850 km/h), the plane's elevators fluttered so much that the control surfaces became unresponsive due to the disrupted airflow. This lack of control tested the aircraft's safety limits. Tucker also began to sense a Mach tuck effect as the airflow over the wings approached the speed of sound. Tucker realized the throttles were at full power, increasing the speed of the aircraft. Releasing his only usable hand to pull back the throttles to idle, he managed to pull the plane out of the dive as it slowed down.

As the DC-10 leveled off at 5,000 feet (1,524 m), Calloway managed to hit Sanders again while the struggle continued, and this time the blow nearly knocked him unconscious. Sanders was losing strength, and Peterson was bleeding from his ruptured temporal artery and was starting to go into shock. In spite of his diminishing strength, Sanders grabbed the hammer out of Calloway's hand and attacked him with it. When the plane was completely level, Tucker alerted Memphis Center, telling them about the attack and requesting a vector back to Memphis. He requested an ambulance and "armed intervention", meaning he wanted a SWAT team to storm the plane. The flight crew eventually succeeded in restraining and disarming Calloway.

With Calloway momentarily under control, Captain Sanders took control of the aircraft from First Officer Tucker, who by then had his sense of touch severely diminished and had additionally become paralyzed on the right side of his body. Tucker went back to assist Peterson in restraining Calloway. Sanders communicated with air traffic control, preparing for an emergency landing back at Memphis International Airport. Meanwhile, Calloway started fighting with the crew again.

Fully loaded with fuel and cargo, the plane was approaching too fast and too high to land on the scheduled runway 9. Due to the plane's weight, speed, and height, it was at risk of breaking up upon landing under these conditions. Sanders requested by radio to land on the longer runway 36L. Ignoring warnings from the Ground Proximity Warning System and using a series of sharp turns that further tested the DC-10's safety limits, Sanders landed the jet safely on the runway at 35,000 lb (16,000 kg) over its maximum designed landing weight. By that time, Calloway was defeated. Emergency personnel and police entered the plane via the escape slide and ladder. Inside, they found the interior of the galley and cockpit covered in blood. Calloway was then arrested, taken off the plane, and—along with Peterson, Tucker, and Sanders—was taken to a nearby hospital.

== Aftermath ==
The crew of Flight 705 survived the attack but were seriously injured. The left side of First Officer Tucker's skull was severely fractured, causing motor control problems in his right arm and right leg. Calloway had also dislocated Tucker's jaw, attempted to gouge out one of his eyes, and stabbed his right arm. Captain Sanders suffered several deep gashes in his head, and doctors had to sew his right ear back in place. Flight Engineer Peterson's skull was fractured and his temporal artery severed. The aircraft itself incurred $800,000 worth of damage.

Calloway pleaded temporary insanity, but was sentenced to two consecutive life sentences (federal sentences are not subject to parole) on August 11, 1995, for attempted air piracy and interference with flight crew. The latter conviction was vacated on appeal, on the grounds that "interference with flight crew members is a lesser-included offense of attempted aircraft piracy." As of October 2026, Calloway is imprisoned at United States Penitentiary, Coleman I, in Pennsylvania.

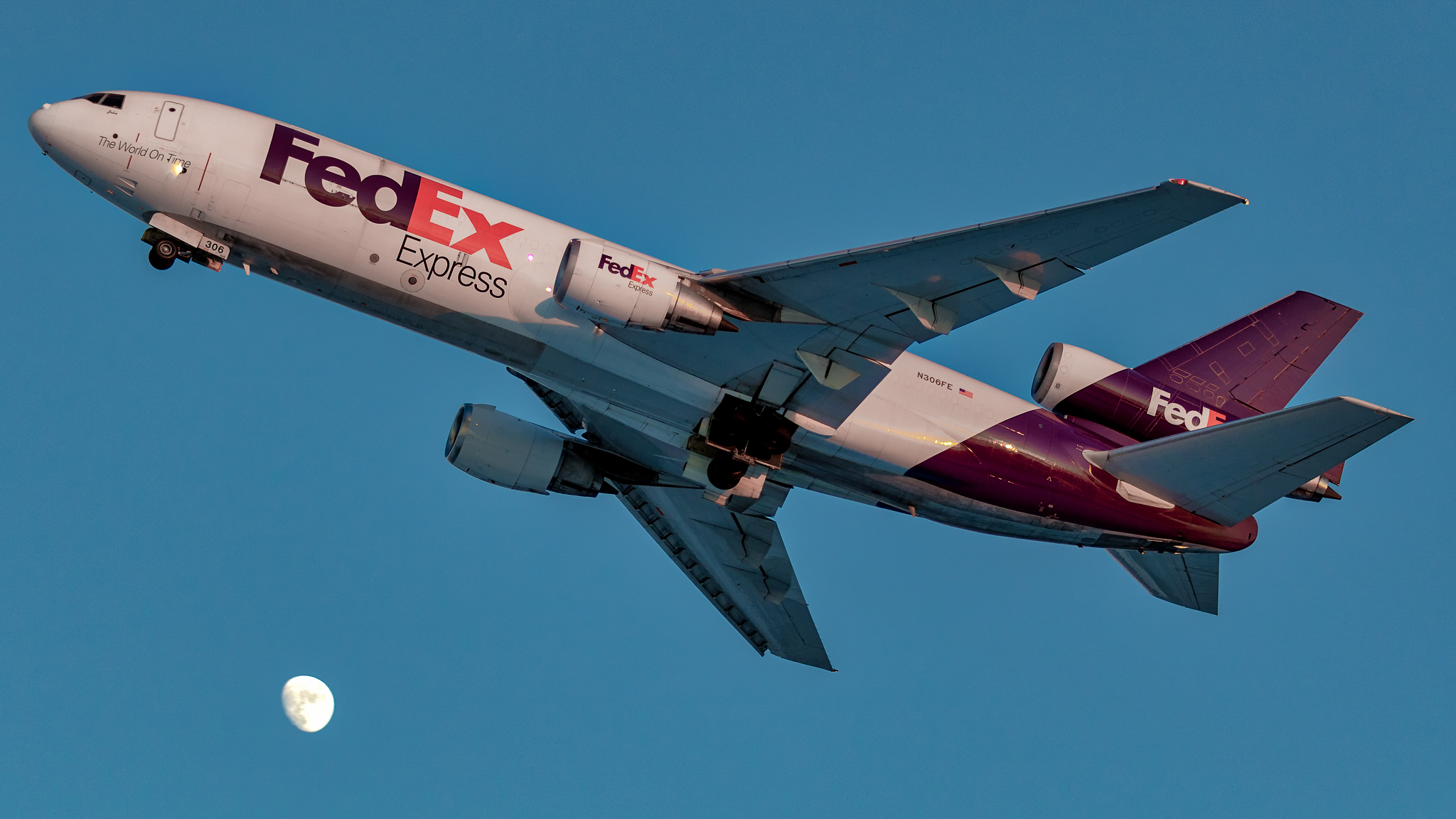
N306FE in 2015

On May 26, 1994, the Air Line Pilots Association awarded Sanders, Tucker, and Peterson its Gold Medal Award for heroism, the highest award a civilian pilot can receive. Due to the severity of their injuries, none of the crew was re-certified as medically fit to fly commercially. However, Tucker returned to recreational flying in his Luscombe 8A by 2002.

The McDonnell Douglas DC-10-30 aircraft involved, N306FE, was repaired after the incident then returned to service. In 2008, it was upgraded to an MD-10 which, among other improvements, eliminated the need for a flight engineer. Later, on June 6, 2022, the aircraft diverted to Tulsa due to a fire indication in the rear lower cargo hold. A ladybug infestation from a leaking package in lower cargo caused an erroneous indication. While some sources record this as an actual fire, no smoke or fire was noted. On December 31, 2022, it was among the last of FedEx's MD-10 fleet to be retired, having made its maiden flight on November 5, 1985, and having been delivered to FedEx on January 24, 1986. As of November 2026 it is stored at Victorville Airport.

== In popular culture ==
The attempted hijacking of Flight 705 was featured in "Fight for Your Life", a season-three (2005) episode of the Canadian TV series Mayday (called Air Emergency and Air Disasters in the U.S., and Air Crash Investigation in the UK and Australia), which included interviews with the flight crew. The dramatization was broadcast with the title "Suicide Attack" in the United Kingdom, Australia, and Asia.

The sixth episode of UK TV series Black Box (called Survival in the Sky in the U.S.), "Sky Crimes", also features the attempted takeover using audio between air traffic control and the crew.

The book Hijacked: The True Story of the Heroes of Flight 705, written by Dave Hirschman, was published in 1997.

The American History comedic podcast The Dollop covered this incident in its 160th episode.

== See also ==
- Accidents and incidents involving the McDonnell Douglas DC-10 family
- List of accidents and incidents involving commercial aircraft
- List of accidents and incidents involving airliners in the United States § Tennessee
- Suicide by aircraft
- Horizon Air Flight 2059, a similar unsuccessful hijacking attempt by a jumpseating crew member.
- Continental Airlines Flight 11, a suicide airliner bombing for insurance fraud.
- VASP Flight 375, an attempted hijacking which was foiled by the pilot.
- All Nippon Airways Flight 61, an unsuccessful hijacking attempt by a passenger.
- Air France Flight 8969, another 1994 hijack which was also foiled.
- British Airways Flight 2069, an attempted hijacking by a mentally unstable passenger.
- Flydubai Flight 1073, an unsuccessful hijacking attempt by the flight's copilot.
