= Survival in the Sky =

- Also known as: Black Box
- Genre: Documentary
- Narrated by: Will Lyman (United States); Sean Barrett (United Kingdom)
- Country of origin: United Kingdom
- Original language: English
- No. of episodes: 6

Production
- Running time: 45 minutes
- Production company: Darlow Smithson Productions

Original release
- Network: The Learning Channel; Channel 4
- Release: 1996 – 1998

Survival in the Sky, known as Black Box in the United Kingdom, is a British documentary series of six one-hour episodes produced by Darlow Smithson Productions for The Learning Channel and Channel 4. The series was narrated by Will Lyman in the United States and Sean Barrett in the United Kingdom. The series primarily concentrated on commercial aviation accidents and the investigations related to them. They were first aired as a series of only four episodes in late 1996, with two additional episodes produced and aired in 1998.

The series was produced with the cooperation of the National Transportation Safety Board (NTSB) and the Air Accidents Investigation Branch (AAIB), and interviews many of the investigators and survivors of air crashes.

A book also titled Black Box (ISBN 0760304009) was published in 1996 as a companion to the series.

== Episodes ==
No.	Title	Incidents	Original release date
1	"Blaming the Pilot"	Birgenair Flight 301; British European Airways Flight 548; Tenerife airport disaster Air France Flight 296; Air Inter Flight 148	1996
As aviation technology improves, pilot error is determined to be the cause of two out of every three crashes.
2	"Deadly Weather"	Air Florida Flight 90; American Eagle Flight 4184; Delta Air Lines Flight 191; United Airlines Flight 585; USAir Flight 427	1996
Worldwide, weather contributes to one-third of all plane crashes. NOTE: As revealed in the episode, the crashes of United 585 and USAir 427 were not caused by weather, but rather were the result of a structural flaw in the aircraft. Despite this, they are included in this episode, rather than in one of the two subsequent episodes where the incidents would be more in line with the episode theme, for reasons unknown.
3	"A Wing and a Prayer"	Aloha Airlines Flight 243; Japan Airlines Flight 123; United Airlines Flight 232	1996
Improper maintenance, undiscovered design flaws and other structural failures.
4	"Crash Detectives"	TACA Flight 510; ValuJet Flight 592; Kegworth air disaster de Havilland Comet decompression incidents Turkish Airlines Flight 981; American Airlines Flight 96; British Airtours Flight 28M	1996
Presents original footage of NTSB investigators filmed at the crash site of ValuJet Flight 592 in the Everglades.
5	"TWA 800: The Investigation; The Death of TWA 800"	TWA Flight 800	1998
A special episode produced after the official findings of the TWA 800 investigation were released.
6	"Sky Crimes"	PSA Flight 1771; Pan Am Flight 103; Federal Express Flight 705	1998
Examines incidents involving either international terrorism or disgruntled airline employees.

== See also ==
- Mayday/Air Crash Investigation
