= Black Box (video magazine) =

Black Box was the first independent documentary videomaking group in Communist Hungary and one of the most important chronicler of the regime change in 1989. It was founded in 1987 by Judit Ember, Márta Elbert, István Jávor, András Lányi and Gábor Vági. The group distributed their documentaries on VHS tapes which were referred to as issues of a video magazine.

The wider recognition of Black Box came after the release of their documentary Plot #301 which documented the inauguration of the leader of the Hungarian Revolution of 1956, Imre Nagy's memorial in Paris in 1988, while showing parallel the protests in Budapest and the corresponding police violence. Some of their widely known films showed the founding of Fidesz (Hungary's current governing party), the Hungarian Round Table Talks, a Duna-gate scandal, and the protests against the Gabčíkovo–Nagymaros Dams. After the regime change in 1989, the group focused their films on disadvantaged groups. In 1993 Black Box won the Hungarian Pulitzer Memorial Prize. Their complete film archives of nearly 4000 hours of footage are kept at the Blinken Open Society Archives.

== History ==
A key moment in the beginning of Black Box's history was one of its founders, István Jávor acquiring a video camera in 1987. This was not only rare at the time, but it also allowed them to get around shooting on film, which was subject to censorship during development, and record directly on VHS tapes.

The official announcement of Black Box's establishment and their goals was published as a pamphlet on 24 May 1987. Initially they operated without permit, similarly to a samizdat, but on 26 January 1989, with the financial support of the Open Society Foundations, they were registered officially as a section of Béla Balázs Studio, becoming one of the first non-governmental foundations before the regime change.

== Roma Media School ==
Besides producing their own films, since the nineties, Black Box has been actively involved in teaching filmmaking to disadvantaged groups of society, including Roma people. Their first educational initiative was the Community Television School led by Márta Elbert, Péter Upor and István Jávor. Under the moniker of the school, they trained cameramen, directors, and editors in different regions of Hungary, they tried to secure work for them at local televisions, and supported them financially for two years.

In 2001, Black Box established the Roma Media School, whose students were integrated into the structure of the University of Theatre and Film Arts in Budapest and received training from the university's teachers. Between 2001 and 2004, 11-13 people received scholarship for the ten months long course each year. One of their students, József Kővári Borz, later went on to initiate a travelling cinema which screened and made films at villages for Roma people. Some of the award-winning films of the students were Fradi Will Win (Norbert Szirmai, 2002), a Goose Plucking (Juci Csík, 2004) and Obituary to Csálé (Edina Balogh, 2004).
