= Blackbox (novel) =

2002 novel by Nick Walker

BLACKBOX: A Novel in 840 Chapters
- First edition
- Author: Nick Walker
- Language: English
- Publisher: Headline Review
- Publication date: 7 May 2002
- Publication place: United Kingdom
- Media type: Print (paperback)
- ISBN: 0-7472-6876-2

Blackbox is the first novel by British writer Nick Walker.

== Plot ==
A stowaway dies on board a flight.

== Major themes ==
A major theme of the book is the six degrees of separation, the theory that people are linked by a surprisingly small number of connections.

== Style ==
The book is written as a countdown of 840 chapters, some as short as a few words. The author creates an atmosphere which has been compared to those in novels by Chris Morris and J. G. Ballard.

== Reception ==
The book was longlisted for the British Book Award and the Whitbread First Novel Award.
