= Jump seat =

Auxiliary seat in a vehicle

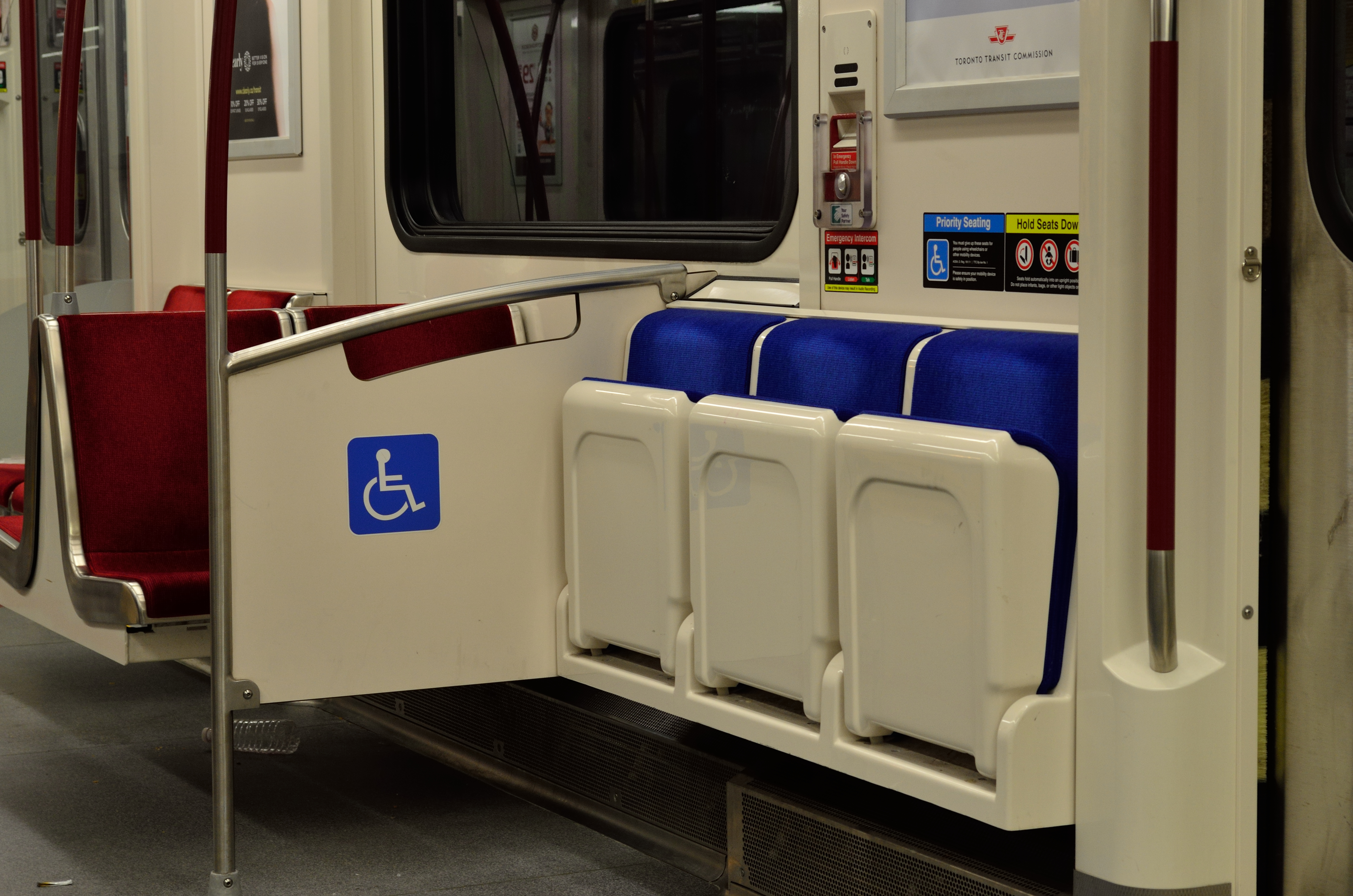
Jump seats in a wheelchair space on the Toronto subway

A jump seat (sometimes spelled jumpseat) is an auxiliary seat in an automobile, train or aircraft, typically folding or spring-loaded to collapse out of the way when not used. The term originated in the United States c. 1860 for a movable carriage seat.

== History ==
Jump seats originated in horse-drawn carriages and were carried over to various forms of motorcar. A historic use still found today is in limousines, along with delivery vans (either as an auxiliary seat or an adaptation of the driver's seat to improve ease of entry and exit for their many deliveries) and various forms of extended cab pickup trucks (to permit a ready trade-off - and transition - between seating and storage space behind the front seat).

=== In aviation ===
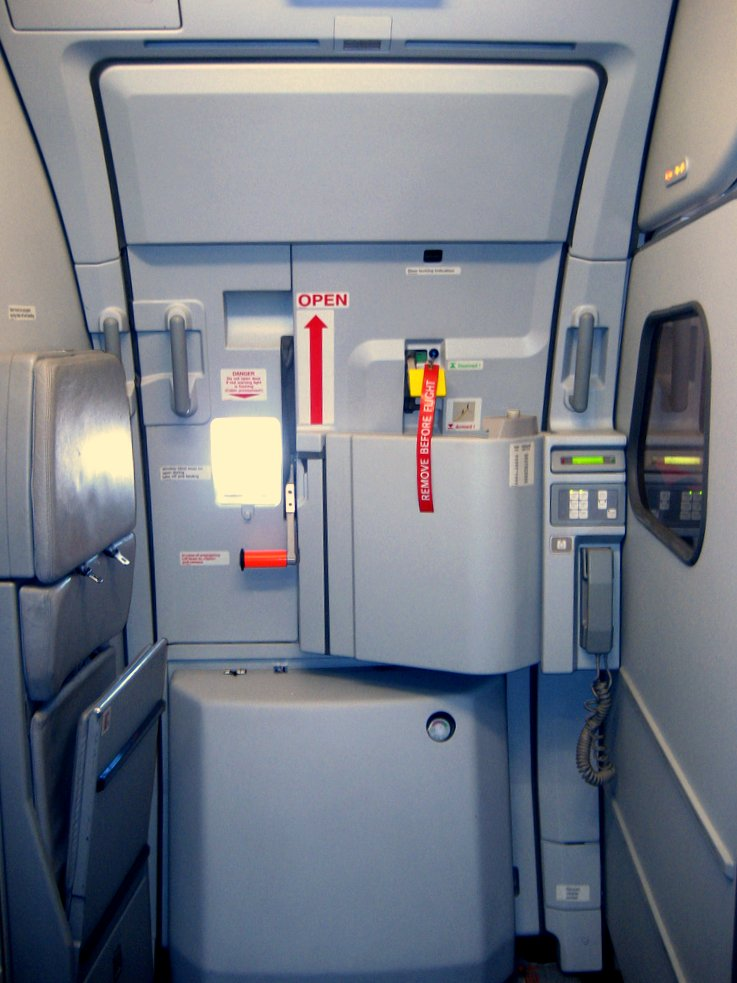
Airbus A319 door showing a folded-up jump seat on the left wall.

Jump seats are found both in the utility areas of the passenger cabin for flight attendant use (required during takeoff and landing) and in the cockpit — officially termed auxiliary crew stations — for individuals not involved in operating the aircraft. Cockpit uses may include trainee pilots observing the flight crew, off-duty crew members deadheading to another airport, or official observers such as regulatory agency or airline inspectors. Airline personnel merely in transit may be assigned auxiliary jump seats in the cabin or designated empty row seating.

Cabin crew jump seats are normally located near emergency exits so that flight attendants can quickly open exit doors in an emergency and aid in evacuation.

Security requirements for both flight deck and cabin jump seat use have been tightened significantly since September 11, 2001.

== Gallery ==
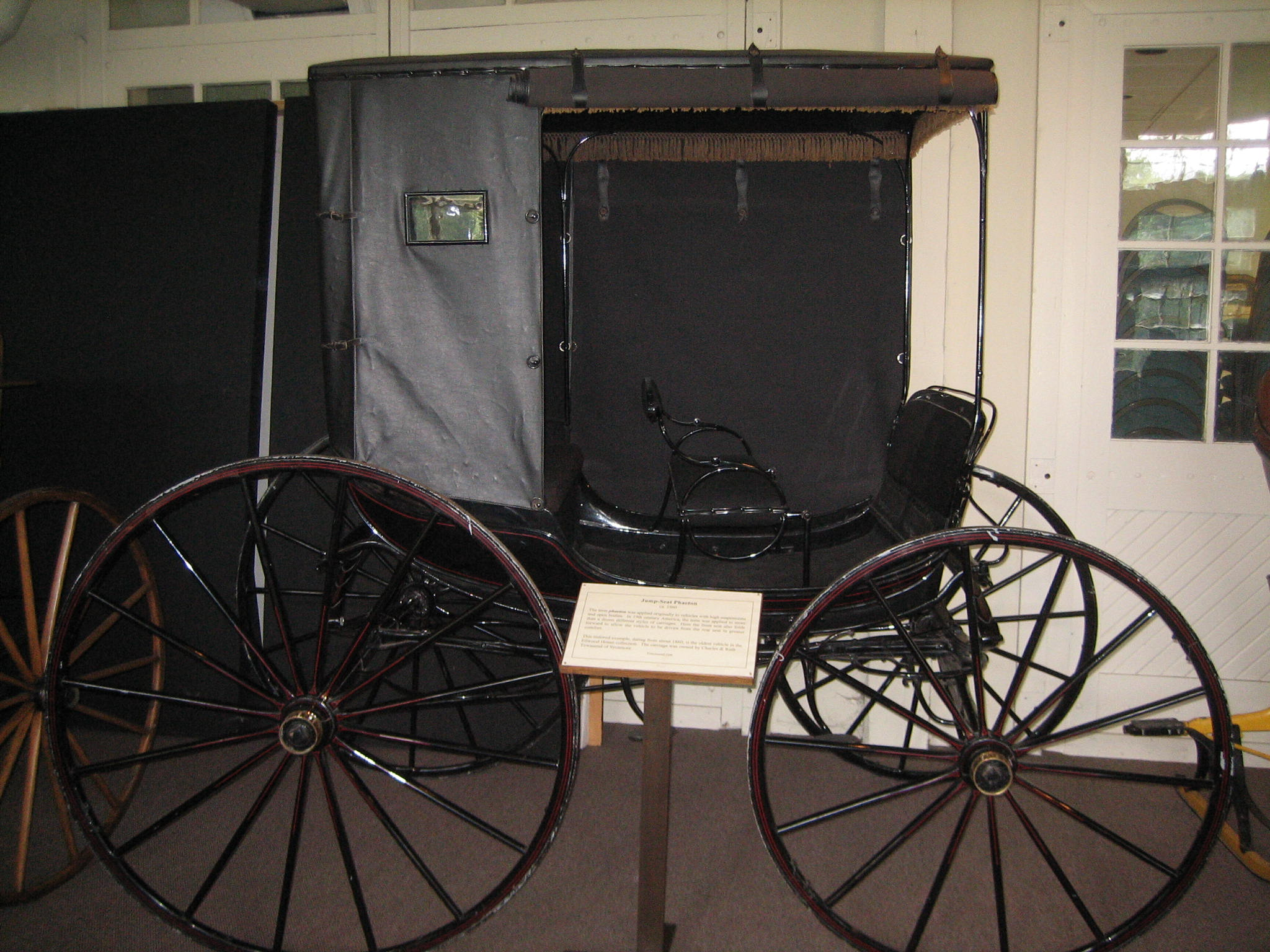
A jump seat, Phaeton carriage, c.1860 at Ellwood House, DeKalb, Illinois, USA

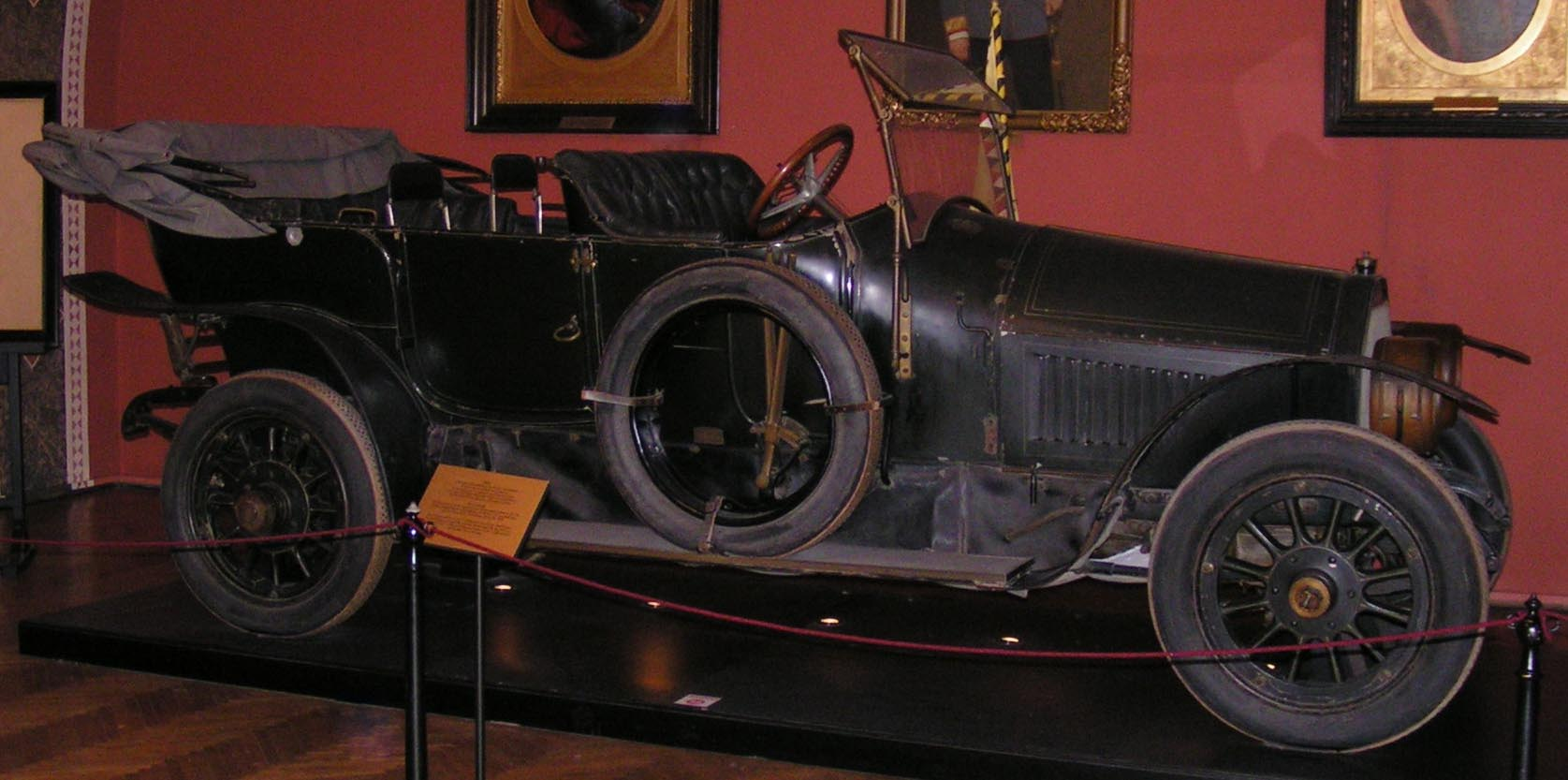
The 1911 Gräf & Stift Double Phaeton in which the Archduke Franz Ferdinand was riding when he was assassinated. Note the two jump seats behind the front seats.

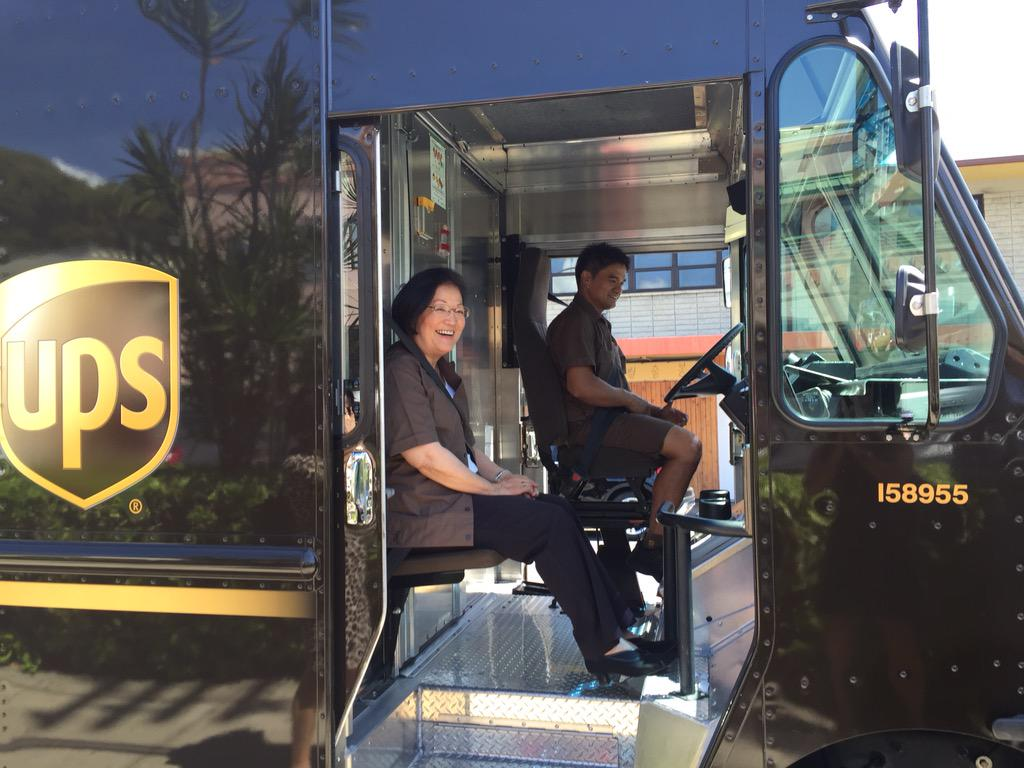
The UPS Driver Helper sits in a jump seat

== See also ==
- Fold down seating
- Folding chair
- Folding seat
- List of seats
- Rumble seat
