= Accident data recorder =

Device in motor vehicles that records traffic accident data

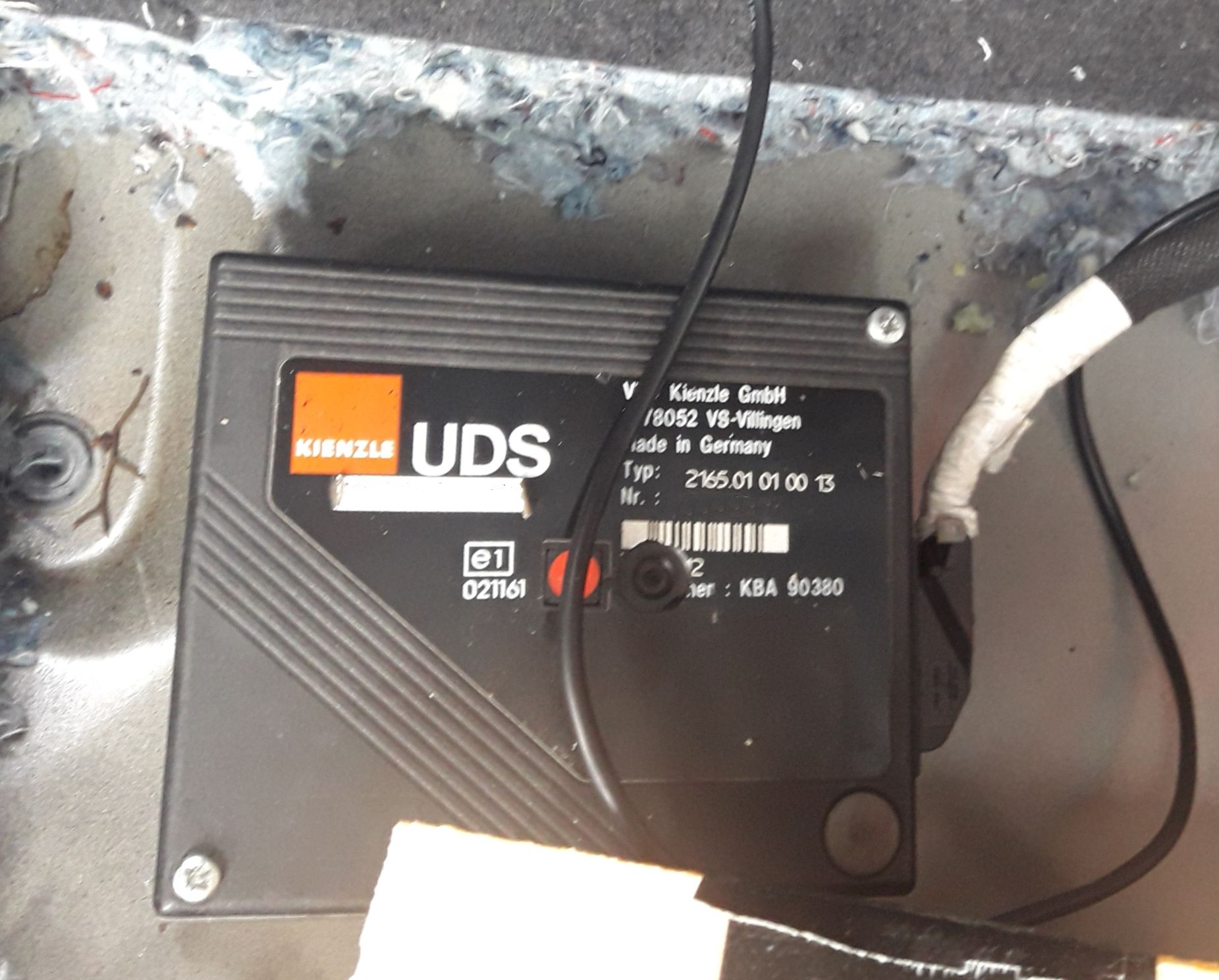
Accident data recorder UDS 2165 (VDO Kienzle rel. 1.3) - Installation during crash test

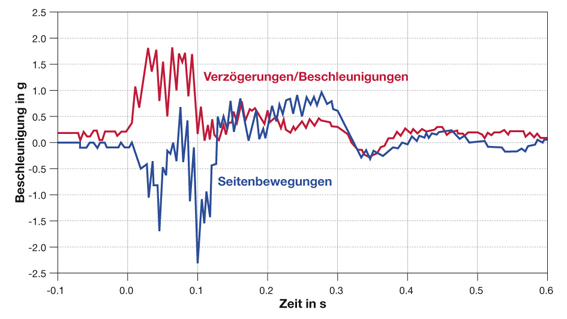
Example of a data curve of a crash recorder that is recorded in a traffic accident.

The accident data recorder (ADR, German commonly abbr.: UDS, also accident (data) writer) is an independent electronic device that records before, during, and after a traffic accident relevant data and thus resembles a flight recorder.

It can be installed in motor vehicles (cars, trucks, buses, motorcycles, trams, and special vehicles) on a voluntary basis in order to obtain more accurate information about the events in an accident. In some countries there are regulations for mandatory installation in different vehicles. The accident data recorder constantly records various data of the vehicle (such as speed, direction of travel, longitudinal and transverse vehicle acceleration, status of the lights, turn signals and braking, etc.) and records them for some time before they are automatically cleared.

In the case of an accident (this is detected by a strong acceleration of the vehicle as a result of an impulse), certain periods of time (usually in the two-digit seconds range) remain permanently stored before and after an event. This makes it much easier to reconstruct events after an accident, so that if necessary the question of fault can be clarified.

Many vehicles of authorities (such as police or ambulance) are equipped with them, as it often comes to assist with disputes that pertain to collisions during high priority calls as well as compliance with applicable laws and regulations. A side effect of vehicles equipped with UDS is that drivers behave more cautiously on the road. According to a survey by the EU Transport Commission, UDS users experienced a 20 to 30 percent decline in traffic accidents.

The accident data recorder is often used by experts or institutions in crash tests as a measuring device.

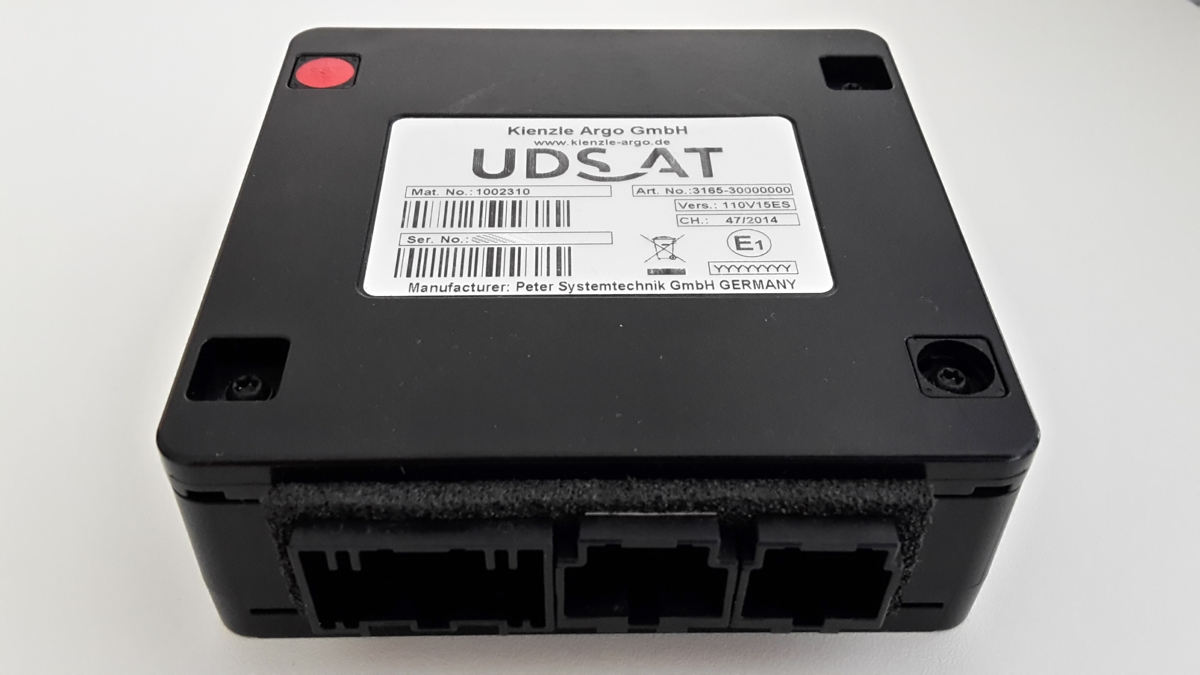
Accident data recorder UDS-AT (third generation)

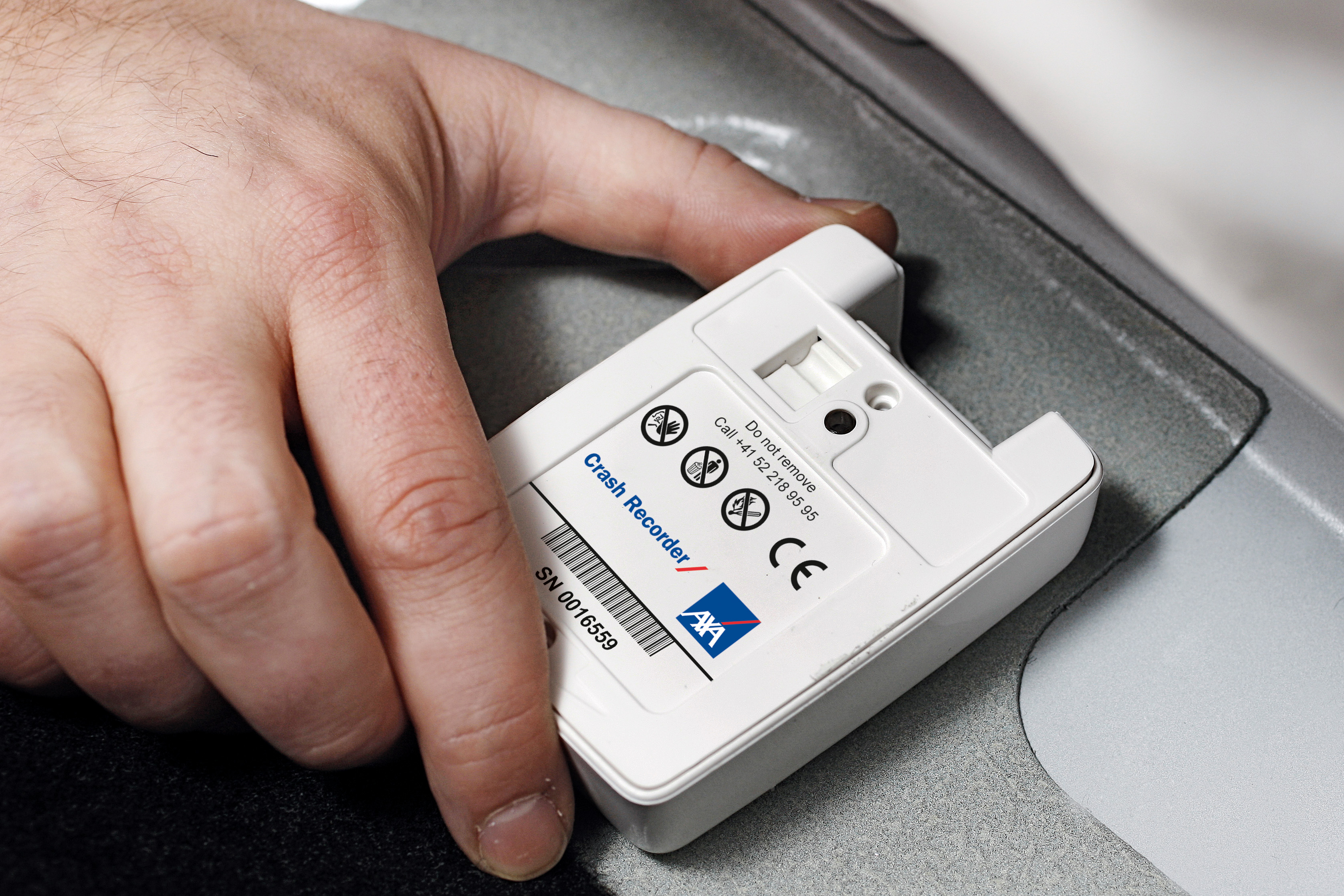
Crash Recorder

The installation (also later) costs about 700 euros and can lead to a deduction for some insurance policies. The accident data recorder can be read by an expert via interface cable. The accident data recorder (older generations) has a switch with which the driver can delete the stored data immediately after an accident so as not to burden himself with the later question of guilt. However, this feature may be disabled, for example for use in company vehicles.

== Technology ==
Accident data recorders work to measure the accelerations, depending on the equipment in two or three spatial directions, with micromechanical sensors. Often several sensor systems with different resolutions are used in order to be able to log both the driving dynamic processes and the collision dynamics. Higher-class systems also offer a possibility for measuring the rotational movements as well as the vehicle speed as well as highly specific measurements to the amount of pressure applied on different controls. The latter can e.g. be calculated from the signal of the vehicle's wheel speed sensor. The recording of any signals that are available on the vehicle's own CAN bus, is possible with higher-class devices as well as the detection of a GPS signal for position and speed determination. Depending on the manufacturer, about 20 to 30 s are recorded before and 10 to 15 s after an event.

Are known today (as of 2018) in the German-speaking countries essentially two suitable for retrofitting accident data recorder. Blacktrack Ltd. offers a low-cost solution, which is mainly used by the insurance industry (e.g. AXA Winterthur in Switzerland). By contrast, the UDS-AT developed by the company consortium Peter Systemtechnik GmbH and Kast GmbH offers extended possibilities of recording and integration into a vehicle.

Residual path recording devices (RAG) from Mobatime AG are external devices that rely on existing on-board signals (distance, speed, operating states of status inputs) and store them in a ring buffer for at least the last 12 km. In contrast to an accident data recorder, they do not have their own measuring sensors.

== US Law ==
In The US, The legal landscape concerning EDRs and ADRs involves an interplay of constitutional principles, particularly the Fourth Amendment's protections against unreasonable searches and seizures. Notably, legal precedents have established exceptions for vehicles, allowing law enforcement to conduct searches without a warrant if probable cause exists. This precedent has been cited in debates regarding the warrantless access of data stored in ADRs.

Recent Supreme Court cases, notably Riley v. California and Carpenter v. U.S., have extended Fourth Amendment protections to digital data, including cell phone information and location data. However, the direct application of these rulings to ADRs remains unclear, contributing to a disparity in legal standards regarding the privacy of car data.

Statutory regulations, such as the Electronic Communications Privacy Act (ECPA), have provided limited protections to third-party-held data, raising questions about their applicability to car manufacturers and ADRs specifically.

Several states have enacted laws supplementing federal regulations to safeguard car data, although the consistency and effectiveness of these measures vary across jurisdictions.

Ongoing Efforts such as the Driver Privacy Act (DPA) and other safeguards aim to regulate access to black box information in vehicles. However, the uniformity in mandating warrants for data access remains a subject of debate and potential future legislative action.

Many states have applicable statutes in which having a self-deletion switch on such a device could be considered tampering with evidence. This is yet to be brought up in any current caselaw as the ADRs that are equipped with such a device are not commonplace in the US.

== Evaluation ==
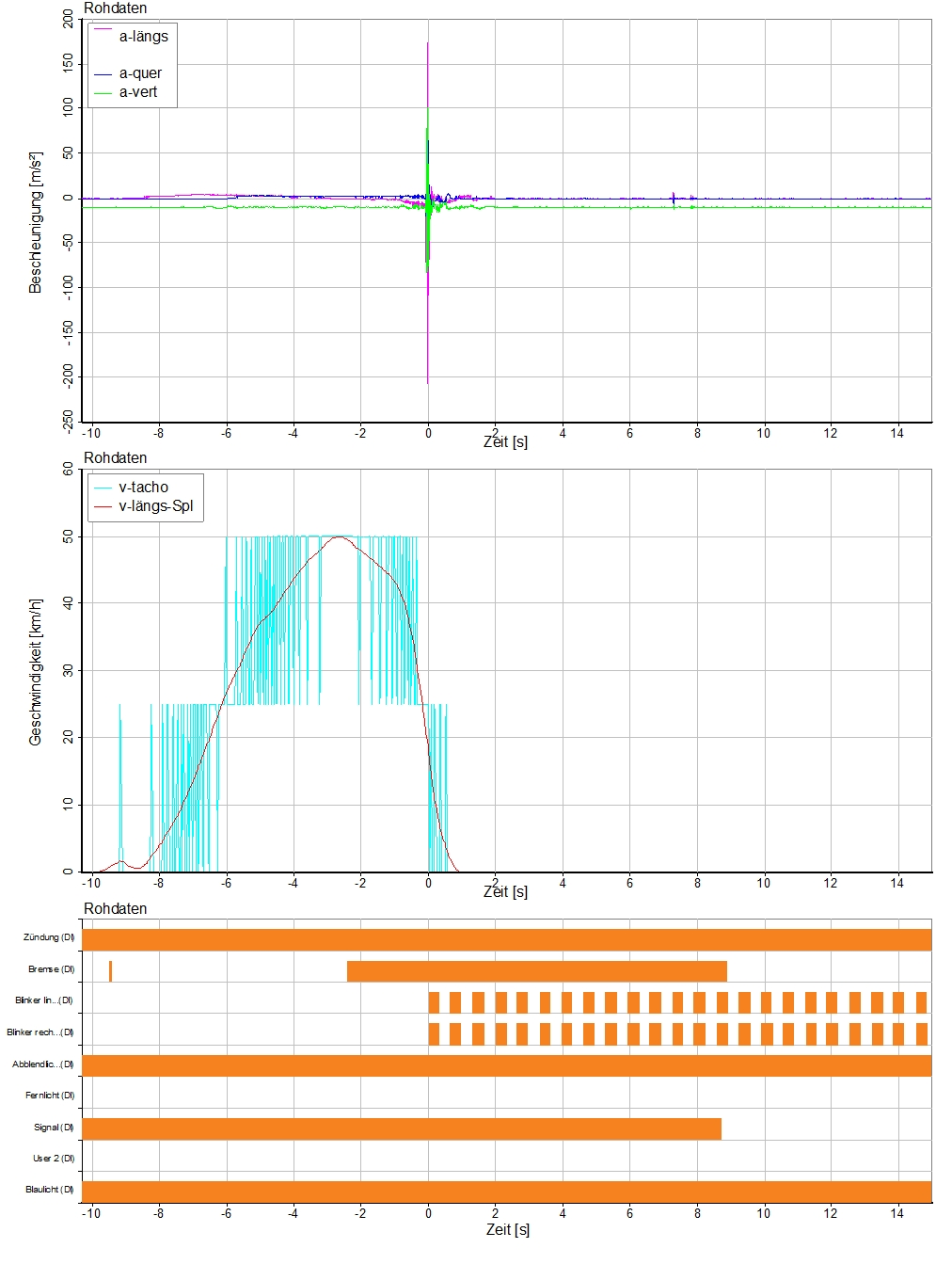
Measurement data of a real accident from an accident data recorder

Reading out the data of an accident data recorder requires special software.

The evaluation and interpretation of measurement data of a traffic accident require special knowledge in the areas of vehicle dynamics, accident reconstruction, metrology and last but not least the accident data storage technology itself. For UDS there is a separate order area for expert witnesses in Germany.

The picture on the right shows the (unprocessed) data curves of a real accident recorded with a UDS. The measured accelerations, the speed and various status channels are plotted over time. It can be seen, for example, that vehicle special signals were switched on prior to the collision and the driver was previously still applying the brake.

== History ==
The nowadays known accident data recorder was invented by Mannesmann Kienzle GmbH, which applied for a patent in 1992. The development began in Germany in the early 1980s with the two companies MBB and Kienzle, who pursued different concepts. In general, the black box was taken as a model, which was developed in the early 1950s in Australia by David Warren. Already in 1973, General Motors applied for a patent for a "vehicle crash recorder". Mannesmann Kienzle delivered the first accident data recorder in early 1993.

== Motorsport ==
In motorsport, accident data recorders (ADR) must be used in various series as specified by the FIA. Starting with the 2015 season, the use of an ADR in the Formula 4 championship was compulsory. In the higher series, the use has been mandatory for some time. In addition to the data of the acceleration sensors mounted on the vehicle, the loads on the driver are also measured with an in-ear accelerometer.

Due to the higher speeds in formula sports compared to road traffic, the sensors have a measuring range of ± 150 g with a resolution of 0.1 g. 2 s are recorded before an event. With an event duration of 30 s, 10 events can be stored.

== Demarcation ==
Both in a flight recorder and in a UDS, the constantly recorded data runs in a ring buffer. However, the flight recorder usually records for longer periods of 17 to 25 hours. In contrast, the UDS only saves a few seconds before and after an event is triggered (e.g. collision) permanently.

The term drive data recorder is generally understood to mean a continuous and permanently available recording of data and signals during the operation of a vehicle, independently of an accident. Such systems are often used in locomotives or trams. Often, however, an electronic logbook is referred to as drive data recorder. Dashcams are sometimes referred to as drive data recorder or video event data recorder (VEDR).

A so-called Event Data Recorder (EDR) is not an accident data recorder in the sense of an autonomous, more or less vehicle-independent device, since an EDR is usually an additional electronic module in an existing control device (e.g. from the Airbag) in a car. EDRs rely exclusively on on-board signals, while UDS have their own inertial sensors. Vehicles with airbag systems store accident-relevant data (impact accelerations, belt buckle conditions, seat positions, trip times) in the internal memory of the tripping electronics. However, the data size varies depending on the manufacturer and only extends over a few seconds or fractions. NHTSA regulations call for uniform data sets for all systems manufactured from 2010 onwards.

== See also ==
- Tachograph – truck
- Telemetry – continuous monitoring of the operating status
- Train event recorder – railway
- Voyage data recorder – ship
