= List of mayors of Lynwood, California =

Mayor of Lynwood
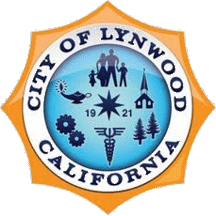
- Seal of Lynwood

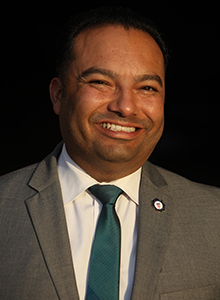
- Incumbent; Jose Solache since December 9, 2021.
- Term length: 1 year
- Formation: 1921

Following is a list of mayors of Lynwood, California

| Image | Mayor | Term | Notes/Citation | Mayor pro tem | Other Council members |
|---|---|---|---|---|---|
| | ? | 1921–1984 | | | |
| | John Byork | 1984–1985 | | | |
| | Robert Henning | 1985–Dec 1986 | First African-American mayor | Evelyn Wells | |
| | Evelyn Wells | Dec 1986 | Acting mayor, first female mayor and second African-American mayor | x | Robert Henning; Paul Richards; John Byork; E.L. Morris |
| | Paul Richards | Dec 1986–Jan 1989 | | | Evelyn Wells; Paul Richards; John Byork; E.L. Morris |
| | Evelyn Wells (2nd term) | 1989–1990 | | Paul Richards | |
| | Robert Henning (2nd term) | 1990–1991 | | | |
| | Louis J. Heine | 1991–1992 | Henning stepped down prematurely in November 1991; The three incumbent members on the council voted for Heine in a special meeting as mayor (incoming councilmember Louis Byrd did not take part) | | |
| | Paul Richards (2nd term) | 1992–1997 | | | |
| | Armando Rea | 1997–1998 | | | |
| | Ricardo Sanchez | 1998–1999 | | | |
| | Louis Byrd | 1999–2000 | | | |
| | Paul Richards (3rd term) | 2000–2001 | | | |
| | Arturo Reyes | 2001–2003 | | | |
| | Fernando Pedroza | 2003–2004 | Pedroza moved to Lynwood in 1979 with his family. In 1984, he graduated from Lynwood High School and then graduated from Webster Career College in Long Beach. Pedroza was elected to the Lynwood City Council in November 2001 and was the city's mayor in 2003. On September 25, 2007, he was ousted from the City Council in a recall election which also resulted in the removal of mayor Louis Byrd and fellow council members Leticia Vasquez and Alfreddie Johnson Jr. Mayor Pro Tem Maria Teresa Santillan, the only council member to not face a recall vote, served as mayor in the interim. | | |
| | Ramon Rodriguez | 2004–2005 | Rodriguez was born in the town of Valparaíso, Zacatecas, Mexico. His family migrated to the United States in 1964, and he grew up in Hawaiian Gardens, California, where he graduated from Artesia High School in Lakewood, California. Rodriguez was elected to the Lynwood City Council in 2001. In 2003, eight members of his family were charged with voter fraud after registering at a fictitious address to vote for his re-election. In December 2004, he was appointed mayor by the City Council. In the December 2005 election he lost re-election to the City Council. He was re-elected to the council in 2007 after a recall election in September 2007 where mayor Louis Byrd and council members Fernando Pedroza, Leticia Vasquez, and Alfreddie Johnson Jr were all removed from office. | | |
| | Leticia Vasquez | 2005–2006 | Vasquez was born and reared in the community, the daughter of immigrants from Mexico. She graduated with a B.A. in criminal justice and a M.A. in public policy & administration from California State University, Long Beach and with a M.A. in education from Pepperdine University. Vasquez was elected to the Lynwood City Council in November 2003 and made history as the first Latina to serve as mayor of the city when she was appointed by the City Council in December 2005. In December 2006, she was succeeded as mayor by Louis Byrd. In September 2007, she was ousted from the City Council in a recall election which also resulted in the removal of mayor Louis Byrd and fellow council members Fernando Pedroza and Alfreddie Johnson Jr. While mayor, Vazquez faced criticism for not pursuing an anti-black agenda promoted by a previous Latino led majority council which resulted in numerous successful lawsuits against the city of Lynwood.ref>Mitchell, John L. (June 5, 2007). "Lynwood a stage for area's racial shift". The Los Angeles Times.</ref> In 2003, she had nominated Louis Byrd for mayor over the Latino candidate. On June 5, 2012, Vasquez was elected to the Central Basin Municipal Water District and is a professor of political science at El Camino College in Compton, California. | | |
| | Louis Byrd (2nd term) | 2006–2007 | | | |
| | Maria Teresa Santillan | 2007–2010 | Santillan was elected to the Lynwood City Council in 2003 after winning a recall election which ousted Paul Richards, a 17-year councilmember, 7-term mayor, and the 2nd African-American mayor of the city (Richard's remaining term ran through December 1, 2005). She was the first Latina to serve on the City Council. In November 2005, she was re-elected to a 4-year term on the City Council and in December 2005, she was named Mayor Pro Tem. In September 2007, she was the only council member to not face a recall election which resulted in the ouster of mayor Louis Byrd and council members Fernando Pedroza, Alfreddie Johnson Jr. and Leticia Vasquez over corruption allegations. In December 2007, she was appointed by the 5-member City Council to serve as mayor succeeding Louis Byrd. She was reappointed as mayor in 2008. She was subsequently re-elected to the City Council in 2009 and 2013. She later served as mayor again from 2016 to 2017. | | |
| | Aide Castro | 2010–2011 | | | |
| | Jim Morton | 2011–2012 | | | |
| | Salvador Alatorre | 2012–2013 | | | |
| | Edwin Hernandez | 2014–2015 | | | |
| | Maria Teresa Santillan (2nd term) | 2016–2017 | Second term. | | |
| | José Luis Solache | 2018–2019 | | | |
| | Aide Castro | 2019–2020 | | Jorge Casanova | Salvador Alatorre; José Luis Solache; Marisela Santana |
| | Marisela Santana | 2020–2021 | | | |
| | Jorge Casanova | 2021–2022 | | José Luis Solache | |
| | Oscar Flores | 2022 - 2023 | | Rita Soto | Gabriela Camacho, Jose Solache, Juan Munoz-Guevara, Rita Soto |
| | Jose Solache | 2024–Present | | Rita Soto | Juan Munoz-Guevara, Rita Soto, Oscar Flores, Gabriela Camacho |
