= Marco Antonio Firebaugh High School =

Location
- 5426 Martin Luther King Jr. Blvd; Lynwood, California; USA; 33.919°N 118.183°W

Information
- Type: High School
- Motto: Pride & Ownership
- Teaching staff: 67.96 (FTE)
- Grades: 9-12
- Enrollment: 1,581 (2023–2024)
- Student to teacher ratio: 23.26
- Colors: Gold and Black
- Athletics conference: CIF Southern Section Prep League
- Mascot: Falcons
- Website: http://fhs.lynwood.k12.ca.us

Marco Antonio Firebaugh High School, also known as Firebaugh High School or just FHS, is one of the three high schools in Lynwood, California. The others are Lynwood High School and Vista High School. It is a part of the Lynwood Unified School District.

Marco A. Firebaugh High School was founded in 2005. Since February 2008 Firebaugh High School has been an IB World School in the Diploma Program. Its first graduating class was in the 2008–09 academic school year. It currently holds freshmen, sophomores, juniors, and seniors. Firebaugh High School adopted Lynwood Middle School as part of its high school in the 2009–10 school year (Grades 7–9).

== History ==
Marco Antonio Firebaugh spoke and presided during the school opening ceremonies in 2005. He received the honor of having a school named after him while alive; other examples include Earl Warren, for whom Warren High School in Downey, California was originally named, and John Glenn, for whom John Glenn High School in Norwalk, California was named.

== Sports ==
Firebaugh High School's athletic program has had recent success. Its volleyball and have been state champions twice and also CIF champions. For the first time, the Men's Falcons Varsity Soccer team went undefeated in league and became Harbor - Gold League Champions by defeating their biggest rival yet, Animo Charter. The Falcons have now qualified to CIF as the leaders of their league. This is the first year that the men's soccer team is in league. They have finished with an overall record of 11 games won, 3 games lost and 2 games tied. Their league record this year has been an incredible 6 games won and 1 tied with one more game to go in season. They ended the season as Harbor League's Co-Champions.
