= Vista High School (Lynwood, California) =

Coordinates: 33.920830°N 118.180256°W

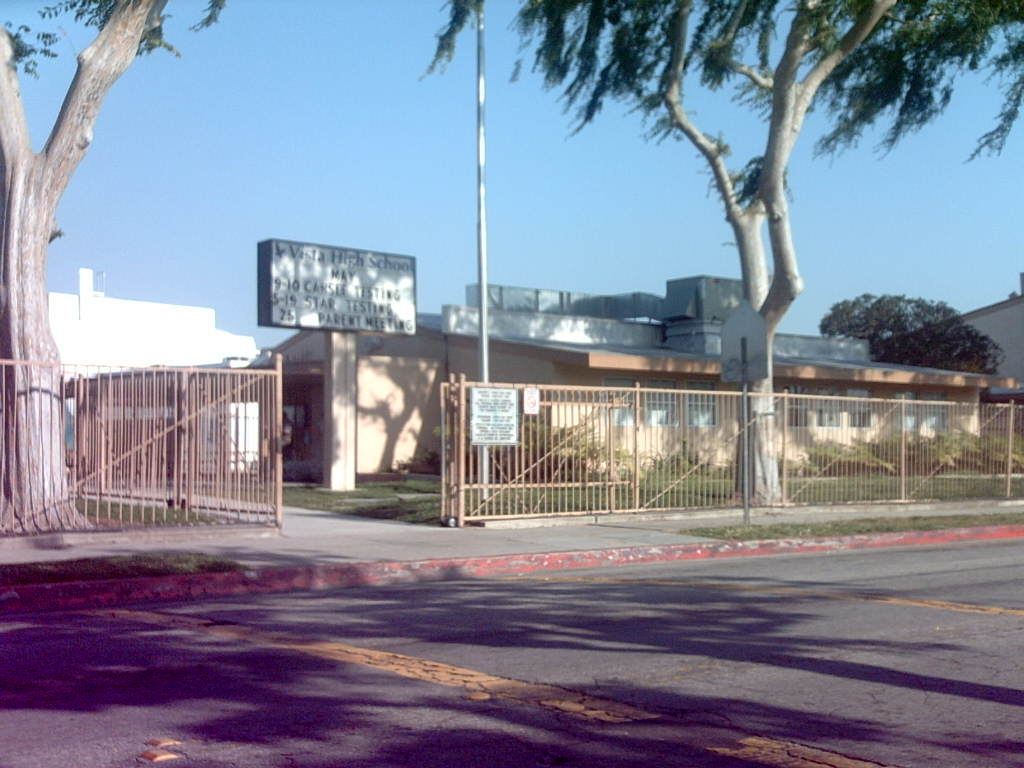
- 11300 Wright Road; Lynwood, California; USA

Information
- Type: Public continuation high school
- Motto: Pursuing Excellence
- School district: Lynwood Unified School District
- Teaching staff: 13.82 (FTE)
- Enrollment: 181 (2023–2024)
- Student to teacher ratio: 13.10
- Colors: Blue; White
- Team name: Eagles
- Website: vhs.mylusd.org

Vista High School is one of the three high schools in Lynwood, California. Vista High is a continuation school and runs Pathway High School, an independent studies program. The other two schools are Lynwood High School which is the main high school, and the other is Marco Antonio Firebaugh High School. They are all part of the Lynwood Unified School District.

== History ==
Vista High School Campus used to be an elementary school (Will Rogers Elementary now located in Duncan Ave.) and was site to Lynwood Adult School until 2000. The Tzu Chi Foundation awarded 15 Students two Scholarships to any school of their choices in 2008, making it the best nomination over the last five years. As of 2008, Vista High School holds the highest test scores within the high schools of Lynwood Unified School District.

== Notable alumni ==
Shawn Estrada - 2008 Olympic Boxer, represented the United States in Beijing.
