= Lil' Libros =

American publishing company

- Founded: 2014; 12 years ago
- Founder: Patty Rodriguez and Ariana Stein
- Country of origin: United States
- Headquarters location: Los Angeles
- Distribution: Simon & Schuster
- Publication types: books
- Fiction genres: children's books
- Official website: lillibros.com

Lil' Libros is a Los Angeles-based independent bilingual children's book publisher. It is a member of the American Booksellers Association, Publishers Association of the West, and Independent Book Publisher's Association.

== History ==
Lil' Libros was founded in 2014 by friends Patty Rodriguez and Ariana Stein to create bilingual children's resources that authentically represented the "duality of being an American Latino." Rodriguez serves as the Chief Creative Officer and Stein as the Chief Executive Officer. In 2021, the company sold more than 1.5 million books, all which introduce cultural immersion and dual-language learning.

The company signed a world wide distribution agreement in 2017 with Gibbs Smith to expand and create books for older age groups. In 2026, a new agreement was signed with Simon & Schuster.

== Selected awards ==
=== 2021 New York Public Library's Best Picture Book ===
- Yefferson, Actually / En realidad, es Yefferson

=== 2022 Chicago Public Library: Best of the Best Picture Books of 2022 ===
- Sana, Sana, colita de rana
- Amor De Colores

=== 2022 Americas Award: Commended Title ===
- The Life of / La vida de Dolores

=== 2022 New York Public Library: Los mejores libros para pequenos 2022 ===
- Sabado

=== 2023 New York Public Library: Best Books for Kids ===
- Wepa

=== 2025 Spanish CLEL Bell Award ===
- Singing / Cantando: La Cucaracha

== Campaigns ==
In 2022, Lil' Libros partnered with Remezcla and Target to place five mini, public libraries in the East Los Angeles neighborhood of Boyle Heights. The founders of the company shared their initiative was a direct response to the Boyle Heights' Benjamin Franklin branch library being shut down. The Lil' Bibliotecas were created to give the community more access to bilingual books.

In 2023, Lil' Libros and OUTFRONT Media partnered to create a campaign in celebration of Hispanic Heritage Month called "Pages of Hispanic Heritage." The campaign consisted of highlighting its Hispanic authors and the titles they have published.

=== Bilingual Book Fairs ===
Lil' Libros partners with preschools, early learning centers, Pre-K / TK, elementary, and middle schools to organize bilingual book fairs. The company provides its entire catalog to schools (books, games, accessories, etc.), which are then used to create the book fair. Schools within Los Angeles County and some surrounding areas (Ventura County or Orange County) are eligible to sign up for a book fair. The fair runs on a tier system where schools are able to fundraise for their programs.
