= Hotelito Desconocido =

Hotel in Tomatlán, Jalisco, Mexico

- Industry: Ecotourism
- Predecessor: W&G Arquitectos
- Founded: 1995
- Founder: Marcelo Murzilli
- Defunct: 19 August 2015
- Headquarters: La Cruz de Loreto, Tomatlán, Jalisco, Mexico
- Number of locations: 1
- Owner: Luis Ángel Orendáin
- Number of employees: 20 (low season); 75 (high season)
- Parent: Inmobiliaria Anfe

Hotelito Desconocido (Spanish: [oteˈlito ðeskonoˈsiðo], "Little Unknown Hotel") was a Mexican boutique hotel and ecotourism resort in the municipality of Tomatlán, Jalisco. Formed in 1995 by an Italian architect, Hotelito Desconocido used an architectural style of that combined both rustic and luxurious designs. It was built on an UNESCO-designated natural reserve that was home to a number of endangered bird and turtle species. The hotel won international and domestic awards for its unique architecture and sustainable energy model, and it was a famous getaway spot for international tourists and celebrities. Its construction, however, created tensions with a local group of fishermen that protested against the alleged ecological violations caused by Hotelito Desconocido's construction and expansions.

In 2007, Hotelito Desconocido was acquired by W&G Arquitectos, a company headed by Wendy Dalaithy Amaral Arévalo. She is the wife of Gerardo González Valencia, a former suspected drug lord of Los Cuinis and the Jalisco New Generation Cartel, two allied criminal groups based in Jalisco. After years of resistance from the local fishermen, three members of their group went missing in Guadalajara, Jalisco in 2011 after attending an ecological preservation meeting. They had reportedly previously received death threats from the hotel's management and local farmers who were also opposed to their protests.

The hotel was shut down for money laundering on 19 August 2015, when the United States Department of the Treasury sanctioned Hotelito Desconocido under the Foreign Narcotics Kingpin Designation Act. In 2018, however, it was revealed that three months prior to the hotel being shut down, W&G Arquitectos had sold the hotel to Immobiliaria Anfe, a property management firm based in Jalisco. Immobiliaria Anfe has brought a lawsuit against the Mexican federal government to have property returned to them.

== Origin and location ==
In 1995, (Note: Another source says the opening date was in 1996.) Marcelo Murzilli, an Italian architect and businessman, formed Hotelito Desconocido. His decision to create a solar-powered resort made of clay and bamboo was inspired by replicas of lake villages in Veracruz that he had seen at the National Museum of Anthropology. For three years, he worked with the municipal, state, and federal authorities in the Mexican government, along with locals from Tomatlán, to get the construction plans approved. His goal was to make a resort that was environmentally and ecologically friendly. The hotel was built along Costalegre in Tomatlán, Jalisco, Mexico, close to a fishermen village known as La Cruz de Loreto. This location was in the UNESCO-designated natural reserve area Playón De Mismaloya, on Bahía de Banderas bay, situated between the Pacific Ocean and the Sierra Madre Occidental, just 96.5 km (60 mi) south of Puerto Vallarta. A typical drive from Puerto Vallarta to Hotelito Desconocido took about two hours. Private transportation was available upon request for guests. (Note: When Hotelito Desconocido first started, the transportation was coordinated by the management team. After experiencing difficulties transporting their guests, they decided to outsource this to a third-party.)

Hotelito Desconocido was closed for visitors from May to October due to low season. During this time, it employed around 20 people, mostly security guards, carpenters, artisans, and cleaning staff. The hotel opened its doors once the water temperatures decreased during autumn because this was the time of the year when turtles started arriving from the northern parts of the ocean. (Note: Another source states that turtle releases at Hotelito Desconocido were popular from July to December.) October to the end of April was considered high season and had a large influx of visitors. The hotel used to employ around 75 people during this time. La Cruz de Loreto also experienced a large number of visitors this time of the year. According to local residents, the town's street food vendors and other hotels were busy during high season.

== Style and accommodations ==
The hotel had 29 rooms and suites built on palafittes located on the edge of an estuary. The rooms were named after Mexican lotería card riddles; each room was decorated according to the theme of its card. To reach their rooms, guests had to use rowboats on a waterway, and raised a flagpole for means of communication. Morning coffee was given to guests after they pulled a rope from their room that erected a red flag. The absence of mobile phones and telephones was intended to provide an isolated experience. In addition, Hotelito Desconocido did not use external electricity and was secluded from nearby human settlements. During the night, the hosts lit candles, torches, and lanterns to light the hotel and pathways. The illumination of the moonlight was also an intended part of the night experience. Throughout the afternoon, guests were encouraged to ride on horseback along the beach, bike through the palm trails, kayak, and play volleyball or billiards. There were also opportunities for bird-watching and baby turtle release activities since the area had over 150 bird species and 3 different turtle species.

Once their day activities were over, Hotelito Desconocido offered guests baths and spa services including aromatherapy or stone therapy. The water used in the spas and baths was heated through the solar-powered panels the hotel had on its roofs. Each room was non-smoking and equipped with small battery-powered fans. The restrooms were open-air and had walls made of bamboo. Frames on the walls were made of unfinished tree trunks. Other furniture and decorations had a rustic Mexican style.

Hotelito Desconocido was a boutique hotel and ecotourism resort that pioneered the "ecoluxe" architecture style in Mexico, which championed rustic architecture along with ecofriendly and luxurious designs. The hotel had daily housekeeping, two restaurants, free breakfast, and courtesy bottled water for guests. The restaurants offered a wide range of Mexican cuisine dishes. The meals were prepared by Federico Tobares, an Argentine citizen and the main chef of the hotel. Most of the guest rooms were painted, tiled, or decorated with Mexican colors or handicrafts. The stools and chairs, known as equipales, were made of wood and leather. They originated from the region's cattle ranchers.

Its combination of rustic Mexican decor and luxurious accommodations attracted mostly international guests. Around 65% of the clientele came from the United States. Another 25% came from Europe, while the remaining 10% of the visitors were from Mexico or other countries. During low season, prices varied between $US350 and $US625, while high season prices were between $US410 and $US790, depending on the room of choice. This did not include the 17% tax added on each reservation. Because rooms could book quickly during some parts of the year, reservations were strongly recommended by travel agencies. The hotel also attracted celebrities and millionaires from across the world because of the privacy and seclusion offered by the resort. Hotelito Desconocido's staff and management had a strict privacy policy and refused to comment on the celebrities that visited the hotel.

=== Awards and recognition ===
On 18 January 2012, SPRB Arquitectos, a Jalisco-based architecture group led by Laura Sánchez Penichet and Carlos Rodríguez Bernal, won a contest sponsored by the International Hotel Awards and Bloomberg Television in London for their work redesigning Hotelito Desconocido; the award granted Hotelito Desconocido a five-star status, and was voted by the contest organizers as the best hotel in terms of architecture in Mexico and Latin America for the 2011–2012 edition. The two Mexican architects explained that their work at Hotelito Desconocido started in 2009 after the owners recognized that the hotel needed major renovations. Since the hotel was initially built using the bajareque model, which uses guayabillo trunks tied together and compressed with mud, the owners decided to demolish the original construction and build the hotel on palafittes. It was also during these renovations that the rooms of the hotel were given their individualized lotería themes. For the landscape design, they kept the agave and fruit gardens; they decided to change the look of the entrance and beach by adding 200 palm trees. They also added additional gardens and new sand.

On 14 November 2014, Hotelito Desconocido was nominated by Food and Travel Magazine as one of the best hotels in Mexico. They were finalist of the "Best Hotel with Charm Award" (Spanish: "Mejor Hotel con Encanto"). On 19 February 2015, Hotelito Desconocido was part of an art exhibition called 21 Arquitectos Jóvenes Mexicanos, relevo generacional (English: "21 Young Mexican Architects, generational reveal"). The exhibition intended to show contemporary Mexican architecture; Hotelito Desconocido was described as regionalist architecture style that supported sustainable energy.

== Ecological violations ==
=== 1990s ===
According to a local group of fishermen, the Cooperative Society of Fish Production La Cruz de Loreto, Hotelito Desconocido had violated environmental laws since 1995 and was damaging the ecosystem. Fisherman from the area filed a complaint to the National Institute of Ecology and Climate Change (INECC) saying that the construction of the hotel damaged the jungle and estuary known as Ermitaño in La Cruz de Loreto. The INECC later conducted an investigation and discovered that Hotelito Desconocido had only obtained an endorsement from the Tomatlán municipal authorities at the time of its inauguration. This meant that the hotel had lacked permission to operate from state and federal authorities since its opening. The INECC also discovered that Hotelito Desconocido had been violating several municipal ecological laws since 2010.

The hotel was also in violation of a presidential decree issued on 28 October 1986. According to the law, the Mexican government designated sixteen ecological reserve areas along the Gulf of Mexico as well as the Mexican coast along the Pacific Ocean where Hotelito Desconocido was located. The decree also included a number of regulations intended to protect these areas from contamination or other damage. Hotelito Desconocido was located on part of a 69.3 km (43 mi) stretch of beach where construction was legally prohibited. This construction ban was put in place to protect the nesting grounds of sea turtles. (Note: There are at least four endangered sea turtle species based in Tomatlán, Jalisco.) By constructing wooden platforms and palafittes on the beach area, Hotelito Desconocido also violated Mexico's Federal Maritime Land Zone Law (ZOFEMAT).

Local fishermen complained to municipal authorities that Hotelito Desconocido's construction was illegal and that Murzilli's plans had not been legally approved. However, municipal officials reportedly told them that the investment brought by the construction was important for Tomatlán's economy. The group decided to establish a working relationship with Hotelito Desconocido; they allowed the construction to continue because they believed that Hotelito Desconocido would bring new jobs to Tomatlán. The hotel ownership was eventually passed down to another Italian national, Giuliano Gasparotto. (Note: Gasporotto, however, was legally just a "secondary owner"; he was the representative and stakeholder of Consorcio Hotelero W&G, S.A. de C.V., which did the construction for Hotelito Desconocido.) The group of fishermen stated that once Gasparotto was in charge of Hotelito Desconocido, he ignored the previous concessions and stopped compensating fishermen MXN$10,000 for every day they could not fish in the sea.

=== 2000–2010s ===
In 2009, Hotelito Desconocido planned to build a large expansion on the beach and tried to get two concessions from the Secretariat of Environment and Natural Resources (SEMARNAT) to permit the construction. The first request was to expand the hotel on the beach by 5,577.1 m^{2} (60,031.4 sq ft) on one part, and 5,330.9 m^{2} (57,381.3 sq ft) on another. The petition passed through the Tomatlán Customs Agency without significant difficulties. It then went to the SEMARNAT offices in Jalisco, where it was reviewed and passed after they concluded that Hotelito Desconocido met the required regulations. The following year, however, the National Commission of Protected Natural Areas (CONANP) federal agency analyzed the expansion project and rejected it after finding that the natural reserve area Playón De Mismaloya would be affected by the construction. It specifically mentioned that the endangered turtle and bird species were at risk of harm if the construction took place.

On 28 September 2010, the fishermen's group filed a complaint with the Federal Environmental Protection Agency (PROFEPA) stating that Gasparotto tried to dig up land with a backhoe in Playón de Mismaloya on 28 July. They stated that he did it without permission and that he had made death threats against one of the group members who opposed such action. Gasparotto's actions were prevented after the fisherman stopped his backhoe from further altering the land and possibly affecting their fishing activities. By 17 August, the fisherman stated that Gasparotto had managed to use the backhoe to alter the beach and that authorities were not aware of this. The fishermen also stated that on 21 August, six members of the Mexican Navy saw that the staff of Hotelito Desconocido were using the backhoe again, but that the staff fled the scene when discovered.

== Mass disappearance incident ==
José de Jesús Romero Quintero, the president of the fisherman organization, filed a report to the police on 21 November 2010, stating that he and Espinoza Díaz had received death threats from Gasparotto. He also complained that government officials were not taking his requests seriously and that Gasparotto was acting with impunity. The fishermen group told the press in 2011 they had evidence of Gasporotto's death threats against them. They filed a video and several documents reportedly implicating Gasparotto to PROFEPA. In one of the documents, they showed that the Ermitaño estuary was a protected wetland under the Ramsar Convention. Another document asked authorities to investigate the constructions done by Hotelito Desconocido along with the wastewater discharges in the area.

On 24 March 2011, three members of the fishermen group, Romero Quintero, Jorge Ruíz López, and Rafael Espinoza Díaz, went missing after attending an ecological preservation meeting in Guadalajara, Jalisco. Their family members stated that they were kidnapped by people who knew they were attending the ecological meeting in Guadalajara, and said that state and federal authorities were not interested in helping them locate their relatives. The three men were supposed to go to the Mexican National Water Commission (Conagua) after the meeting but never arrived. One of the family members stated that it was difficult to file a kidnapping report with Jalisco officials.

=== Investigation and aftermath ===
After they officially filed the case in Jalisco, the family members sent a letter to Mexican President Felipe Calderón. Calderón responded to their request and assigned the investigation to the Office of the General Prosecutor (PGR). However, the family stated that the PGR did not follow-up with them for over a month after officially being assigned to the case. The fishermen group had attended a meeting on 17 March in Guadalajara, where they reportedly received death threats from a man named Antonio Vélez. The family members believe that the disappearance of their three members stemmed from conflicts they had with Gasparotto and ejido members from Portezuelos, La Barca, Jalisco in those two meetings. According to their version of the story, former Governor of Jalisco Francisco Javier Ramírez Acuña hosted parties at Hotelito Desconocido and they believe he might be responsible for the mass disappearance. They also said Calderón visited too. The mother of one of the missing members stated that Efraín Aréchiga, the lawyer who was in company of the three men in Guadalajara, did not return to La Cruz de Loreto for six months after they went missing. She believes that his six-month hiatus was suspicious and that he might have been involved in the mass disappearance as well.

The fishermen's group provided economic help to the three widows and ten orphan children left behind after the disappearance of Romero Quintero, Ruíz López, and Espinoza Díaz. Once Calderón's presidency concluded, the family members sent additional letters for help to President Enrique Peña Nieto (2012–2018).

Gasporotto decided to give up the ownership of Hotelito Desconocido after suffering an accident where he lost his eye. Members of the fisherman group said that Gasporotto left to Uruguay, but lost track of him after he moved to South America.

== Money laundering activities ==
On 5 November 2007, Hotelito Desconocido's ownership was transferred to W&G Arquitectos, a parent company owned by Wendy Dalaithy Amaral Arévalo, (Note: Another source stated that W&G Arquitectos and HD Collection were both parent companies of Hotelito Desconocido.) the wife of Gerardo González Valencia, a former suspected high-ranking drug lord of the Jalisco New Generation Cartel and Los Cuinis, two allied criminal groups in Jalisco. W&G Arquitectos paid US$7.7 million for the land and the buildings on the property; for the construction equipment, they paid US$285,000; and for trademark rights, they paid US$250,000. Each of these transactions included three additional value-added tax payments totaling US$182,250, US$42,750, and US$37,500 respectively. The real estate purchase contract cost US$78,370. This meant that W&G Arquitectos spent over $US8.5 million dollars (approximately MXN$91.3 million in 2007) to acquire Hotelito Desconocido. According to a notarized document, W&G Arquitectos took out several loans from Bansí, a bank based in Guadalajara, to purchase Hotelito Desconocido. W&G Arquitectos and Víctor Ángel García Pérez, a second beneficiary, received MXN$40 million from Bansí.

W&G Arquitectos was formed on 1 April 2005, by Amaral Arévalo and her brother Héctor Alonso. They created the company in a notary firm owned by Alejandro Soberón Alonso in Mexico City. Both of them were previously involved in the construction industry. According to registry documents, the company was headquartered in Naucalpan, State of Mexico, and provided services in construction, engineering, architecture, and real estate. Its variable capital in 2005 was of MXN$18 million. Amaral Arévalo had MXN$5.95 million in stock; María del Carmen Arévalo Monzón and Areco Construcciones had MXN$3.6 million and MXN$8.4 million in stock respectively. On 1 January 2007, prior to buying the hotel, Amaral Arévalo asked for a MXN$58 million loan from Juan Carlos Cortez Orendáin. The variable capital of W&G Arquitectos increased by MXN$73.5 million after this loan was given. Hotelito Desconocido paid the loan back to Bansí on 9 August 2012. For a period of at least 8 years, from the time it was purchased to its closure in 2015, several shareholders passed through Hotelito Desconocido's management.

According to local residents, once the ownership of Hotelito Desconocido was passed on to W&G Arquitectos, they began to see suspicious activity near the hotel. One of the members of the fishermen's group stated that some of the hotel workers said they sometimes saw helicopters deliver packages at the hotel. He also stated that he had seen suspicious convoys of black vehicles in some of the dirt roads leading to the hotel.

=== Economic sanctions ===
On 19 August 2015, the United States Department of the Treasury's Office of Foreign Assets Control (OFAC) sanctioned 15 Mexican businesses, including Hotelito Desconocido and W&G Arquitectos, and 6 Mexican nationals, under the Foreign Narcotics Kingpin Designation Act. Hotelito Desconocido and W&G Arquitectos were charged with providing financial and material assistance to Los Cuinis and their leader Abigael González Valencia (brother of Gerardo), who was responsible for coordinating international drug trafficking operations. Their assets were frozen in the United States, and U.S. citizens were prohibited from carrying out transactions with the entities and individuals in mentioned. This measure was also extended to Amaral Arévalo and businessman Fernando Torres González, who was linked to Hotelito Desconocido. Amaral Arévalo was also linked to HD Collection S.A. de C.V., a business managed by her and Torres González that was also linked to Hotelito Desconocido.

According to the OFAC, this sanction was part of a joint effort with the Drug Enforcement Administration (DEA) office in Los Angeles working with the Mexican government. The intention of this sanction was to dismantle Los Cuinis' business network and uncover the businesses that were operating illegally and laundering drug money. The U.S. government first heard of Hotelito Desconocido through a wire tapped phone conversation between Abigael Valencia and Diana María Sánchez Carlón, one of his financial assistants. (Note: According to the United States Department of the Treasury, Sánchez Carlón was also linked to other businesses like AG & Carlón, Ahome Real Estate, Grupo Dijema, Consultoría Integral La Fuente, Sociedad Civil, Agrícola Tavo, Desarrollo Agrícola Orgánico, Desarrollo Agrícola Verde de Sayula, and Step Latinamédica.) Sánchez Carlón had been introduced to Abigael by Jennifer Beaney Camacho Cázares, a close friend of hers and wife of Abigael. (Note: According to the United States Department of the Treasury, Camacho Cázares was linked to AG & Carlón, Grupo Dijema, and Agrícola Boreal.) Both Sánchez Carlón and Camacho Cázares were sanctioned through the Kingpin Act for their alleged role in money laundering.

=== Closure and aftermath ===
The same day the Kingpin Act sanctions were made public, the PGR seized Hotelito Desconocido and closed it down. (Note: Hotelito Desconocido stated on 16 April 2015, prior to the Kingpin Act sanction, that they were closing until further notice.) In addition to money laundering concerns, the Mexican government also suspected that CJNG may have used the hotel as a meeting spot for its members. The seizure was executed following a formal request performed through the Secretariat of Finance and Public Credit. The National Banking and Securities Commission (CNBV) also froze several Mexican bank accounts from a previous investigation that they had opened. Torres González's assets were temporarily frozen in Mexico. The 14 other businesses sanctioned through the Kingpin Act were not confiscated by the Mexican government that day.

A few days after Hotelito Desconocido was shut down, local authorities from Tomatlán expressed their worries about the effects that it would have on tourism and employment in the municipality; they stated that its closure would impact the economy and make Tomatlán less attractive for international tourists, and that it would cause around 100 people to lose their jobs. The Jalisco Secretariat of Tourism stated that one less hotel in town was a huge loss for meeting accommodation demands for visitors. According to a spokesperson from the agency, Hotelito Desconocido had met all the requirements lawmakers had requested of it. He also stated that the hotel had participated in campaigns to promote local tourism. Another local tourism official said that he hoped that the closure of Hotelito Desconocido would not negatively affect the ecosystem of the area (particularly the turtle release programs).

On 4 April 2016, the OFAC sanctioned 7 other companies under the Kingpin Act for being associated to the business network of Los Cuinis and Abigael. One of the companies was Status Administrativo, which was linked to Hotelito Desconocido and W&G Arquitectos. According to the bulletin, Status Administrativo had the same address as Hotelito Desconocido and was authorized to charge its credit card debts on the hotel's behalf. It also managed a parking lot address in Guadalajara that was shared with W&G Arquitectos. This investigation was also a result of a joint operation between the OFAC and the DEA. As a result of the sanction, Status Administrativo's U.S.-based assets were frozen, and U.S. citizens were prohibited from doing business with this entity.

In late 2016, Hotelito Desconocido was put up for sale by the Mexican government's Asset Administration and Disposal Service (SAE) agency, with signs asking people interested in buying the property to contact the SAE.

== New management and lawsuits ==
In 2018, the press published information on the new management of Hotelito Desconocido. Though not publicly known at the time, it was revealed that three months prior to its closure, in May 2015, W&G Arquitectos had sold the hotel to a man known as Luis Ángel Orendáin for MXN$50 million. Orendáin sued the Mexican government and issued a writ of amparo demanding them to give him back the property, which was no longer owned by W&G Arquitectos as had previously been believed. According to court documents in a Jalisco appeals court, Hotelito Desconocido was sold by Maribel Torres Suárez and Arévalo Monzón, who were part of W&G Arquitectos and had owned the hotel since 2013, to Inmobiliaria Anfe, a property management firm owned by Orendáin and based in Jalisco. (Note: Inmobiliaria Anfe paid Arévalo Monzón five times between 7 May and 31 July 2015, summing a total of MXN$25,700,000. Torres Suárez was also paid five times between 15 and 26 June 2015 for a total of MXN$20,000,000, per bank statements.) When the hotel was closed by the government, Inmobiliaria Anfe issued a lawsuit against the PGR and asked them to return the property to them, arguing that their firm was not guilty of the wrongdoings the hotel's previous management was accused of.

Court documents explained that in 2007, W&G Arquitectos bought the hotel for US$8.5 (approximately MXN$90.7 million in 2007). The hotel's variable capital was of MXN$72,750 at the time of purchase. Later that year, on 31 December 2007, suspected CJNG member Julio Alberto Castillo Rodríguez became the owner of a significant portion of the firm's shares, owning a stake in the hotel valued at MXN$59.9 million. Three months later, his stake in the firm increased to a total of MXN$152 million. By 31 July 2008, he owned shares in Hotelito Desconocido equivalent to MXN$267 million, and by 30 July 2009 his stake was valued at MXN$515 million, 86% of the hotel's capital variable capital. In 2015, he sold his investments for MXN$11 million, a sum 50 times cheaper than their prior valuation.

== See also ==
- Mexican drug war

== Sources ==
Footnotes

Bibliography

- Angulo, Annuska (2003). Lifestyles: Nature & Architecture, Amazing Hotels in Mexico. AM Editores. p. 200. ISBN 978-9685336338.
- Arieff, Allison; Burkhart, Bryan (2005). Spa: Evergreen Series. Taschen. p. 480. ISBN 978-3822858905.
- Baird, David; Bairstow, Lynne (2001). Frommer's Portable Puerto Vallarta, Manzanillo & Guadalajara (3 ed.). John Wiley & Sons. p. 208. ISBN 978-0764564369.
- Henderson, Justin (2016). Moon Puerto Vallarta: Including Sayulita & the Riviera Nayarit. Avalon Books. p. 400. ISBN 978-1631212321.
- Kunz, Martin Nicholas (2008). Cool Hotels Beach Resorts. teNeues. p. 221. ISBN 978-3832792749.
- Massó, Patricia (2006). Cool Hotels: Ecological. teNeues. p. 399. ISBN 978-3832791353.
- Onstott, Jane; Mellin, Maribeth (2009). The Unofficial Guide to Mexico's Best Beach Resorts. John Wiley & Sons. p. 480. ISBN 978-0470379974.
- Onstott, Jane (2009). Puerto Vallarta 2010: With Guadalajara, San Blas, and Inland Mountain Towns. Fodor's Travel Publications. p. 288. ISBN 978-1400008513.
- Whipperman, Bruce (2007). Moon Puerto Vallarta: Including the Nayarit and Jalisco Coasts. Avalon Books. p. 420. ISBN 978-1566918497.
- Witynski, Karen; Carr, Joe P. (2001). Casa Adobe. Gibbs Smith Publishers. p. 190. ISBN 978-1586850319.
