= Long Beach station =

Long Beach station may refer to:

- Downtown Long Beach station, a light rail station in Long Beach, California
- Long Beach station (LIRR), a commuter rail station in Long Beach, New York
- Lynwood station, a light rail station in Lynwood, California, formerly named Long Beach Boulevard station
