= Lynwood, California =

City in California, United States

- City
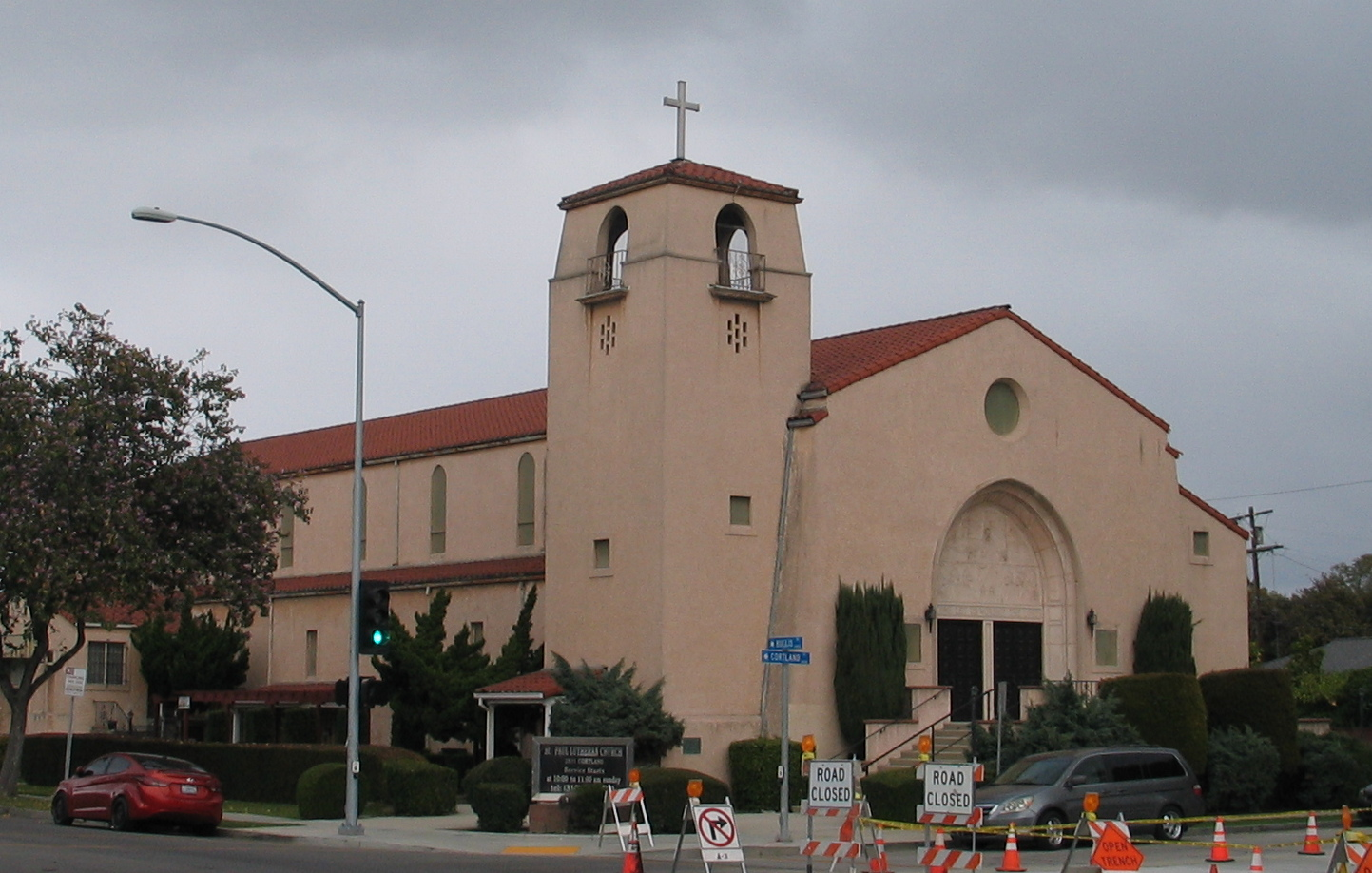
- The historic St. Paul's Lutheran Church, built in a Mission Revival style.

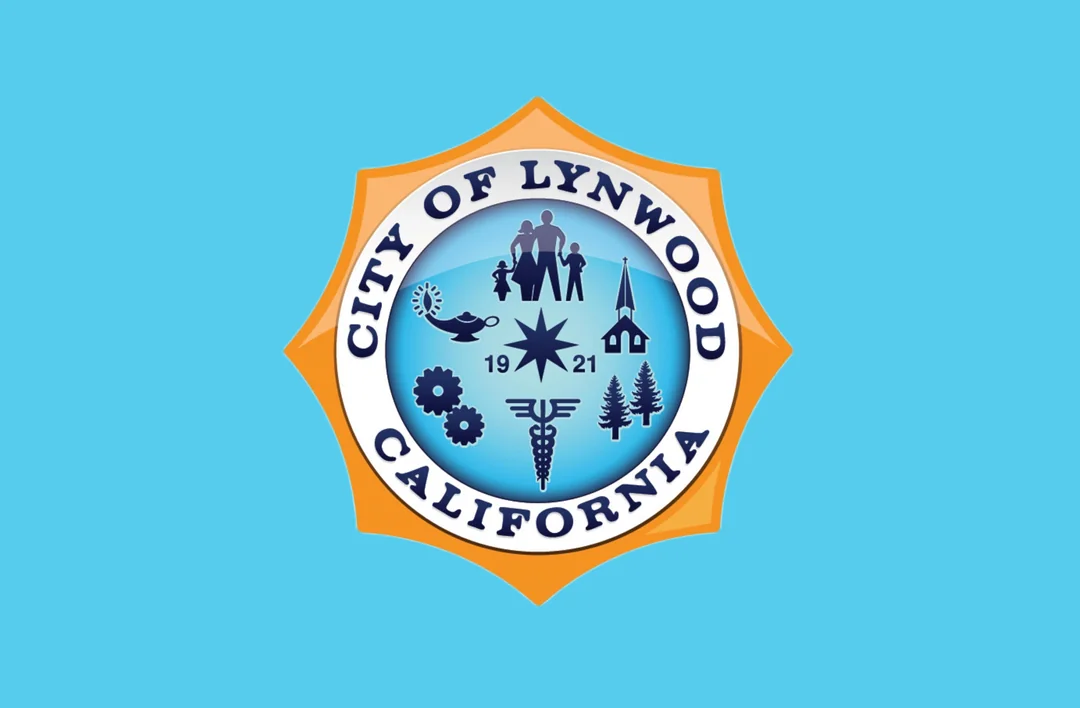
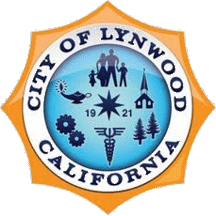
- Flag Seal
- Interactive map of Lynwood, California
- Location in the United States
- Coordinates: 33°55′29″N 118°12′7″W
- Country: United States
- State: California
- County: Los Angeles
- Incorporated: July 16, 1921

Government
  - Type: Council-Manager
  - Mayor: Rita Soto
  - Mayor Pro Tem: Gabriela Camacho
  - City Council: Luis Gerardo Cuellar; Juan Muñoz-Guevara; Lorraine Avila Moore
  - City Manager: Gabriel A. Gonzalez (interim)

Area
  - Total: 4.84 sq mi (12.53 km^{2})
  - Land: 4.84 sq mi (12.53 km^{2})
  - Water: 0 sq mi (0.00 km^{2}) 0%
- Elevation: 92 ft (28 m)

Population (2020)
  - Total: 67,265
  - Density: 14,440.1/sq mi (5,575.37/km^{2})
- Time zone: UTC-8 (Pacific)
  - Summer (DST): UTC-7 (PDT)
- ZIP code: 90262
- Area codes: 310/424, 323
- FIPS code: 06-44574
- GNIS feature IDs: 1660965, 2410901
- Website: lynwoodca.gov

Lynwood is a suburban city in Los Angeles County, California, United States. At the 2020 census, the city had a total population of 67,265, down from 69,772 at the 2010 census. Lynwood is located near South Gate and Compton in the central portion of the Los Angeles Basin. Incorporated in 1921, Lynwood was named after the Lynwood Dairy and Creamery, from which the local station of the Pacific Electric Railway had been named.

== History ==
Spanish aristocrats, or dons, and American pioneers purchased, settled, and formed a small communal town in the area. In 1810, Don Antonio Maria Lugo was awarded 11 square leagues of land in California by the king of Spain for his military service during the establishment of the Francisco missions in the state. After Lugo received these tracts of land (29,514 acres), Lugo named the area Rancho San Antonio, possibly after birthplace at La Misión San Antonio de Padua, in Jolon, California. These tracts of land make up the bordering cities of Bell, Bell Gardens, Commerce, Cudahy, Huntington Park, Lynwood, Maywood, Montebello, South Gate, Vernon, and Walnut Park today.

Once majority non-Hispanic white, Lynwood elected its first Black councilmember in 1983 and in December 1985, elected its first Black mayor, Robert Henning. Into the 1990s, the political establishment remained in the control of the Black population which was gradually eroded by ascendent Latino population. After a succession of African American mayors (Evelyn Wells, Paul Richards), Lynwood saw its first Latino mayor, Armando Rea, in 1997.

On March 20, 2006, Lynwood's longest serving former mayor Paul H. Richards II was sentenced to 15 years in federal prison after being convicted in 2005 on numerous corruption charges that centered on his funneling of $6 million in city business — including exorbitant no-bid contracts — to a "consulting company" controlled by him and his family. Richards had served on the City Council from 1986 until he was recalled by voters in 2003; during that time he served seven terms as mayor.

== Geography ==
According to the United States Census Bureau, the city has a total area of 4.8 square miles (12 km^{2}), all land.

== Demographics ==
Historical population
Census	Pop.	Note	%±
1930	7,323		—
1940	10,982		50.0%
1950	25,823		135.1%
1960	31,614		22.4%
1970	43,354		37.1%
1980	48,289		11.4%
1990	61,945		28.3%
2000	69,845		12.8%
2010	69,772		−0.1%
2020	67,265		−3.6%
U.S. Decennial Census

=== Racial and ethnic composition ===
Lynwood, California – Racial and ethnic composition Note: the US Census treats Hispanic/Latino as an ethnic category. This table excludes Latinos from the racial categories and assigns them to a separate category. Hispanics/Latinos may be of any race.
Race / Ethnicity (NH = Non-Hispanic)	Pop 1980	Pop 1990	Pop 2000	Pop 2010	Pop 2020	% 1980	% 1990	% 2000	% 2010	% 2020
White alone (NH)	9,404	3,959	2,044	1,539	1,212	19.37%	6.39%	2.93%	2.21%	1.80%
Black or African American alone (NH)	16,674	13,009	9,118	6,752	5,301	34.35%	21.00%	13.05%	9.68%	7.88%
Native American or Alaska Native alone (NH)	169	112	103	76	64	0.35%	0.18%	0.15%	0.11%	0.10%
Asian alone (NH)	955	1,066	490	390	397	1.97%	1.72%	0.70%	0.56%	0.59%
Pacific Islander alone (NH)	955	1,066	228	170	182	1.97%	1.72%	0.33%	0.24%	0.27%
Other race alone (NH)	462	234	50	167	278	0.95%	0.38%	0.07%	0.24%	0.41%
Mixed race or Multiracial (NH)	x	x	309	226	404	x	x	0.44%	0.32%	0.60%
Hispanic or Latino (any race)	20,884	43,565	57,503	60,452	59,427	43.02%	70.33%	82.33%	86.64%	88.35%
Total	48,548	61,945	69,845	69,772	67,265	100.00%	100.00%	100.00%	100.00%	100.00%

=== 2020 census ===
As of the 2020 census, Lynwood had a population of 67,265 and a population density of 13,894.9 inhabitants per square mile (5,364.9/km^{2}). The median age was 32.1 years. The age distribution was 26.2% under the age of 18, 11.4% aged 18 to 24, 30.0% aged 25 to 44, 23.1% aged 45 to 64, and 9.4% who were 65 years of age or older. For every 100 females, there were 93.7 males, and for every 100 females age 18 and over, there were 90.0 males age 18 and over.

The census reported that 96.7% of the population lived in households, 0.5% lived in non-institutionalized group quarters, and 2.8% were institutionalized. In addition, 100.0% of residents lived in urban areas, while 0.0% lived in rural areas.

There were 15,553 households, of which 55.1% had children under the age of 18. Of all households, 49.9% were married-couple households, 9.2% were cohabiting couple households, 14.2% had a male householder with no spouse or partner present, and 26.7% had a female householder with no spouse or partner present. About 9.1% of households were one person, and 3.2% had someone living alone who was 65 years of age or older. The average household size was 4.18, and there were 13,453 families (86.5% of all households).

There were 15,846 housing units at an average density of 3,273.3 units per square mile (1,263.8 units/km^{2}), of which 15,553 (98.2%) were occupied. Of occupied units, 46.6% were owner-occupied and 53.4% were occupied by renters. The homeowner vacancy rate was 0.3%, and the rental vacancy rate was 2.0%.

=== 2023 ACS estimates ===
In 2023, the US Census Bureau estimated that the median household income was $70,236, and the per capita income was $21,193. About 14.2% of families and 17.4% of the population were below the poverty line.

=== 2010 census ===
At the 2010 census, Lynwood had a population of 69,772. The population density was 14,415.7 inhabitants per square mile (5,565.9/km^{2}). The racial makeup of Lynwood was 27,444 (39.3%) White (2.2% Non-Hispanic White), 7,168 (10.3%) African American, 464 (0.7%) Native American, 457 (0.7%) Asian, 206 (0.3%) Pacific Islander, 31,652 (45.4%) from other races, and 2,381 (3.4%) from two or more races. Hispanic or Latino of any race were 60,452 persons (86.6%).

The census reported that 67,120 people (96.2% of the population) lived in households, 449 (0.6%) lived in non-institutionalized group quarters, and 2,203 (3.2%) were institutionalized.

There were 14,680 households, 9,790 (66.7%) had children under the age of 18 living in them, 8,303 (56.6%) were opposite-sex married couples living together, 3,266 (22.2%) had a female householder with no husband present, 1,569 (10.7%) had a male householder with no wife present. There were 1,281 (8.7%) unmarried opposite-sex partnerships, and 105 (0.7%) same-sex married couples or partnerships. 1,064 households (7.2%) were one person and 328 (2.2%) had someone living alone who was 65 or older. The average household size was 4.57. There were 13,138 families (89.5% of households); the average family size was 4.62.

The age distribution was 22,977 people (32.9%) under the age of 18, 8,705 people (12.5%) aged 18 to 24, 21,245 people (30.4%) aged 25 to 44, 13,075 people (18.7%) aged 45 to 64, and 3,770 people (5.4%) who were 65 or older. The median age was 27.8 years. For every 100 females, there were 94.7 males. For every 100 females age 18 and over, there were 91.1 males.

There were 15,277 housing units at an average density of 3,156.4 per square mile, of the occupied units 6,829 (46.5%) were owner-occupied and 7,851 (53.5%) were rented. The homeowner vacancy rate was 1.9%; the rental vacancy rate was 3.7%. 34,023 people (48.8% of the population) lived in owner-occupied housing units and 33,097 people (47.4%) lived in rental housing units.

=== 2000 census ===
As of 2000, speakers of Spanish as their first language accounted for 77.43% of residents, while English was spoken by 22.13%, Thai was spoken by 0.16%, Samoan was spoken by 0.09%, Gujarati was spoken by 0.07%, Tagalog was spoken by 0.07%, Vietnamese by 0.05% of the population.

Lynwood went through five phases of demographic change in the 20th century. First, a colonial settlement. Second, a farming small town. Third, a mostly working-class white suburb (some of the residents of Okie background) from 1940 to 1970. Fourth, a majority African-American city between 1970 and 1990, and today, predominantly Latino.

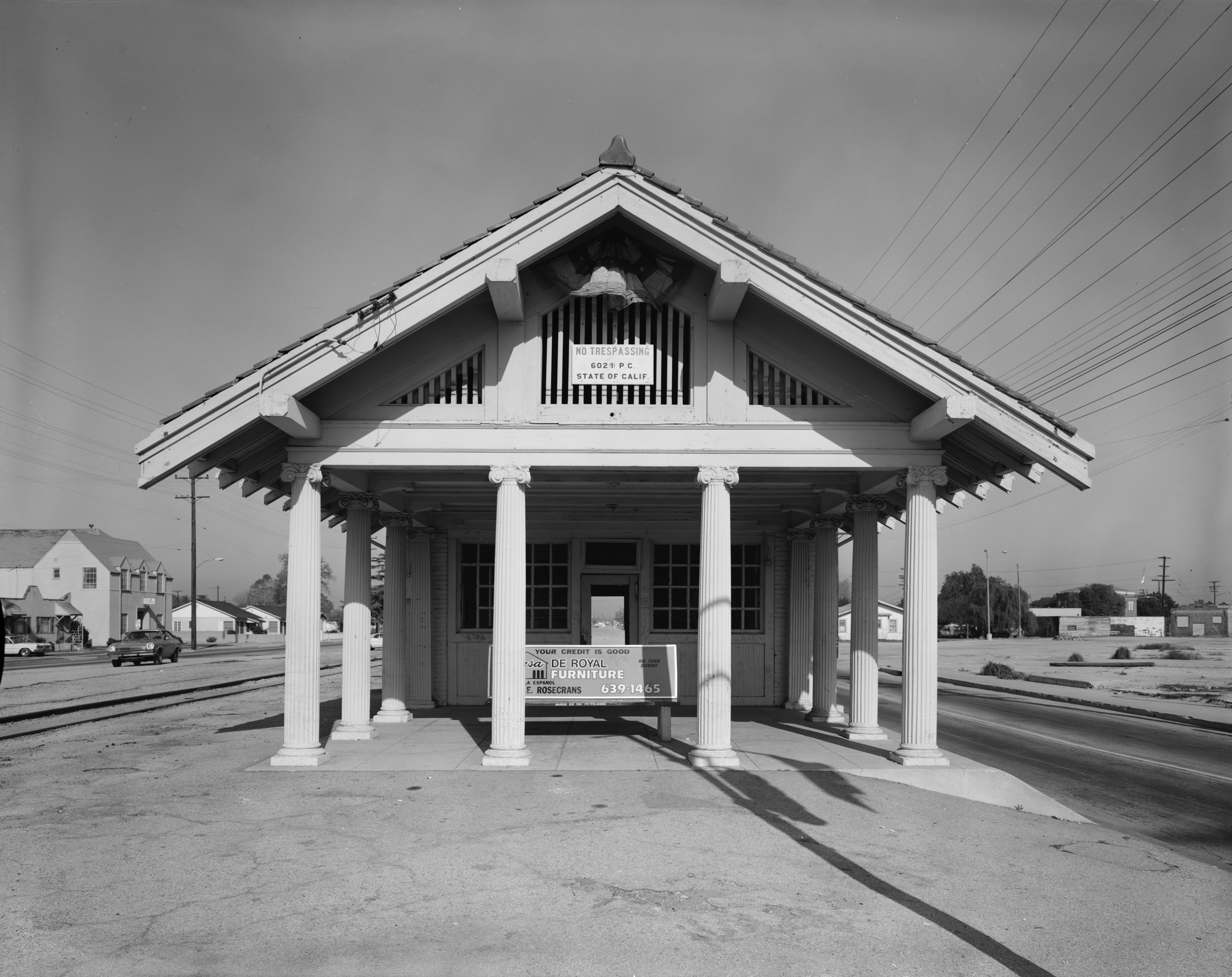
Lynwood Pacific Electric Railway Depot, designed by Bernard Maybeck in 1917.

In 2000, Mexican (68.1%) and Salvadoran (2.9%) were the most common ancestries in Lynwood. Mexico (84.0%) and El Salvador (7.8%) were the most common foreign places of birth.

== Government and infrastructure ==
The Long Beach Freeway (I-710) and Century Freeway (I-105) run through the city. The C Line of the Los Angeles Metro runs through the city, in the median of I-105, and serves the city at Lynwood station.

Fire protection in Lynwood is provided by the Los Angeles County Fire Department. The LACFD operates Station #147 at 3161 East Imperial Highway and Station #148 at 4262 Martin Luther King Jr. Boulevard, both in Lynwood, as a part of Battalion 13 The Los Angeles County Sheriff's Department (LASD) operates the Century Station in Lynwood. The Los Angeles County Department of Health Services operates the South Health Center in Watts, Los Angeles, serving Lynwood.

Lynwood is represented in the 62nd California State Assembly District by Jose Solache and in the 33rd Senate District represented by Democrat Lena Gonzalez. In the United States House of Representatives, Lynwood is in California's 44th congressional district, represented by Democrat Nanette Barragán. Janice Hahn represents Lynwood located in the Fourth Los Angeles Board of Supervisors District.

The United States Postal Service operates the Lynwood Post Office at 11200 Long Beach Boulevard and the East Lynwood Post Office at 11634 Atlantic Avenue.

The City of Lynwood's website states that the city operates the following parks and pocket parks: Adolfo Medina Park, Camphor Tree Park, Carnation Park, Little Pillar Park, Los Amigos East Park, Los Amigos West Park, Lynwood City Park, Mark Twain School Park, Rose Park, Senator Lara Linear Park, Veterans Memorial Garden, Yvonne Burke-John D. Ham (Burke-Ham) Park.

== Education ==
Most of Lynwood is served by the Lynwood Unified School District. High schools include Lynwood High School, Marco Antonio Firebaugh High School, and Vista High School.

=== Public libraries ===
County of Los Angeles Public Library operates the Lynwood Library at 11320 Bullis Road.

== Sister cities ==
- Aguascalientes, Aguascalientes, Mexico
- Zacatecas, Zacatecas, Mexico
- Talpa de Allende, Jalisco, Mexico

== Notable people ==
- Rick Adelman, NBA coach
- Jim Barr, MLB pitcher
- Glen Bell, founder of Taco Bell
- Kat Blaque, YouTube personality and transgender rights activist
- Gennifer Brandon, WNBA player
- Rick Burleson, MLB Shortstop
- Kevin Costner, actor and director
- Louella Daetweiler, All-American Girls Professional Baseball League player
- Dudley Dickerson, Three Stooges actor
- Ed Fiori, professional golfer
- Steven Dean Gordon, serial killer on California's death row
- David Greenwood, UCLA and NBA basketball player
- Greg Harris, professional baseball pitcher
- Robert Henning, first African-American mayor of Lynwood
- Davon Jefferson, professional basketball player in the Israeli Basketball Premier League
- Leslie Jones, comedian
- Jim Ladd, radio broadcaster
- Ulysses Llanez, soccer player who represented the United States national team
- Pat Martin, radio broadcaster
- Bob May, professional golfer
- Kathleen Miller, actress
- Shane Mosley, boxing champion
- Efren Navarro, professional baseball player
- Violet Palmer, NBA referee
- Ricky Peters, MLB outfielder
- Paul Richards, former mayor of Lynwood
- Patty Rodriguez, producer, author, radio personality
- Pete Rozelle, NFL Commissioner, 1960–89
- Loretta Sanchez, politician who served in the United States House of Representatives
- Duke Snider, Hall of Fame outfielder for the Brooklyn and Los Angeles Dodgers
- Dave Stevens, artist, illustrator and creator of the Rocketeer
- Jeff Tedford, college football coach
- Janet Thurlow, jazz singer
- Robert Van't Hof, professional tennis player and 1980 NCAA singles champion for University of Southern California
- Fidel Vargas, mayor of Baldwin Park
- Julio G, radio host and DJ
- Leon White, professional wrestler "Big Van Vader"
- Evelyn Wells, the first female and second African-American mayor of Lynwood
- Venus Williams, tennis player, former World no. 1 and 7-time Grand Slam winner
- "Weird Al" Yankovic, parody musician; named his 2006 album Straight Outta Lynwood in honor of his hometown

== Landmarks and attractions ==
Landmarks in Lynwood include Plaza México, Lynwood Pacific Electric Railway Depot, and Lynwood Park. Plaza México is a shopping mall located at 3100 E Imperial Highway in Lynwood, California. The mall is inspired by traditional Mexican plazas and incorporates architectural and cultural elements that celebrate Mexican heritage. It serves as both a commercial and cultural hub, offering a unique shopping and dining experience while hosting events that reflect the vibrancy of Mexican traditions. The Lynwood Pacific Electric Railway Depot is a historic landmark in Lynwood, California, that reflects the city's transportation heritage. Originally constructed in 1917, the depot was part of the Pacific Electric Railway's Santa Ana Line, which provided interurban train service connecting Lynwood to Los Angeles and surrounding communities.

== See also ==
- St. Francis Medical Center
- South Central Los Angeles
