= Evelyn Wells (politician) =

American politician

Mayor of Lynwood
- In office January 1989 – January 1990
- Preceded by: Paul Richards
- Succeeded by: Robert Henning
- In office December 2, 1986 – December 16, 1986
- Preceded by: Robert Henning
- Succeeded by: Paul Richards

City Council of Lynwood
- In office November 1985 – 1993

Personal details
- Born: 1946 or 1947 (age 78–79)
- Spouse: Donald Morris

Evelyn Wells (born 1946/1947) is an American politician who served as the first woman mayor and second African-American mayor of Lynwood, California.

== Biography ==
In November 1985, Wells was elected to the City Council, the second African-American and the first woman elected to the council in 20 years (Ruthann McMeekin served from 1954 to 1958). In December 1985, she nominated Robert Henning for mayor who was subsequently approved by the City Council becoming Lynwood's first African-American mayor, and she was named mayor pro tem. After the November 1986 election, Black control of the City Council was solidified after the addition of Paul Richards. On December 2, 1986, the council deadlocked 2–2 on appointing Hennings successor, the result of the absence of councilmember John Byork who had pneumonia. They also deadlocked in agreeing to extend the date for the vote so Byork could return. Henning, who supporting his council ally Wells, resigned on the same day making Wells acting mayor, the first woman to hold the office in Lynwood. On December 16, 1986, Byork returned and the full council voted 3-1 for Paul Richards as mayor (Henning abstained, Wells voted against, and Richards, Byork, and council member E.L. Morris voted for the nomination). Although she relinquished the gavel, Wells physically refused to give up the center seat as historically, the mayor pro tem served as the next mayor stating that she was not chosen because she was a woman. In January 1989, the council voted 4-1 (E.L. Morris voted against) to name Wells as mayor succeeding Richards. In February 1989, she was able to get the council to unanimously pass an assault weapons ban. In April 1989, she secured in a 3–2 vote for the renaming of Century Boulevard to Martin Luther King Boulevard over the objection of local businessowners; the three Black Council members voted in favor while E.L. Morris and Louis J. Heine voted for different names. She supported the development of the Genesys Project, a military-style school exclusively for young Black men in the city. She served as mayor until January 1990 when her political ally Henning was again named as mayor. In 1991, Henning was defeated in a bitter campaign for a seat on the City Council by school principal Louis Byrd leaving Wells and Richards without effective majority control of the City Council (Byrd, although Black, was allied with Latino councilman Armando Rea leaving white councilman Heine as the swing vote). In 1992, she unsuccessfully ran for the 52nd district in the California Assembly finishing third in the Democratic primary with 24.8% of the vote to Willard Murray (with 45.4%) and Compton councilwoman Patricia Moore (with 29.8%).

On April 2, 1993, her husband, Donald Morris, was shot and killed a day after he accused her of having an affair. She did not stand for re-election.

== See also ==
- List of first African-American mayors
- African American mayors in California
