= Disappearance of Federico Tobares =

Mexican disappearance case

Federico Tobares
- Born: 23 February 1976; Gualeguaychú, Entre Ríos, Argentina
- Disappeared: 5 June 2013 (aged 37); Guadalajara, Jalisco, Mexico
- Status: Missing for 12 years, 10 months and 29 days
- Occupation: Chef
- Employer: Jalisco New Generation Cartel (suspected)
- Height: 1.77 m (5 ft 10 in)
- Parents: Carlos Tobares (father); Ana María Surraco (mother)

Federico Tobares, an Argentine high-end restaurant chef, went missing near Guadalajara, Jalisco, Mexico, on 5 June 2013. On the day of his disappearance, Tobares was driving a vehicle as a favor for the owner of the restaurant where he worked when he went unaccounted for. The last contact anyone had with him was that afternoon, when he phoned a friend to say he was driving the vehicle for his boss and was being guided by another car. He reportedly said he was scared and had a bad feeling about what he was doing before hanging up. He disappeared shortly thereafter. His vehicle was found abandoned in Michoacán days later, but no trace of Tobares was ever found.

Tobares had been living in Mexico since 2009 and was working as a chef for several high-end restaurants in Jalisco. Investigators later concluded that the restaurants were owned by the Jalisco New Generation Cartel (CJNG), an organized crime group operating in the region, without Tobares's initial knowledge. Family members have stated that they believe the CJNG targeted him because of what he may have seen or known about their activities. They suspect he may have witnessed something compromising while on the job. The owner of the restaurants was Gerardo González Valencia, a former high-ranking member of the CJNG, who was arrested in 2016 and is now serving a life sentence on unrelated charges tied to the cartel's drug trafficking and money laundering operations. Tobares's disappearance remains unsolved.

== Background ==
Carlos Federico Tobares was born in Gualeguaychú, Entre Ríos, Argentina, on 23 February 1976; (Note: According to another source, he was born in Formosa Province.) to father Carlos Tobares and mother Ana María Surraco. He grew up in Formosa Province and studied in Buenos Aires. In Formosa, he met his wife Carolina Evans. Among his circle of friends and family members he was nicknamed "Fede" (short for Federico) and "Gordo" (Fatty). (Note: In Argentina it is common for people to nickname individuals of larger build "Gordo", as a sign of affection.) According to his friends, Tobares enjoyed travelling, going to the beach, and was a fan of soccer team River Plate.

In 2009, he decided to leave Argentina and move to Mexico after he found a job as a chef in the resort city of Puerto Vallarta, Jalisco. Tobares was particularly fond of Mexican cuisine. In Jalisco, he worked as the main chef of Hotelito Desconocido, a luxurious boutique hotel in Tomatlán. He also worked at Nudoki Sushi Bar, an Asian restaurant in Puerto Vallarta. (Note: Another source states that the Asian restaurant was Nudoki Pisco & Sake, owned by a Colombian businessman.) According to investigators, these two restaurants were owned by Gerardo González Valencia, a high-ranking leader of Los Cuinis, a branch of the Jalisco-based criminal group Jalisco New Generation Cartel (CJNG). (Note: The source mentioned that Gerardo González Valencia was part of the Los Cuinis group, which is a branch of the Jalisco New Generation Cartel.) The Mexican drug war is an ongoing conflict between such groups and the Mexican government.

Tobares met Gerardo through an Argentine dentist who lived in Mexico. Her husband had worked at Hotelito Desconocido, which was managed by Gerardo's wife Wendy Dalaithy Amaral Arévalo. Tobares and his wife first worked at Hotelito Desconocido, but Gerardo invited him to join Nudoki Sushi Bar, arguing he did not know about cuisine and that he would let him run the business. Gerardo reportedly offered to make Tobares his business partner. By that time, Tobares had separated from his wife and was open to new work opportunities. His family believes Gerardo did this to keep Tobares quiet about anything Tobares could potentially divulge about the CJNG's illicit activities.

== Disappearance ==
Location of Puerto Vallarta, Jalisco (in red) within Jalisco

The last known contact with Tobares was at 12:32 p.m. on 5 June 2013, the day he disappeared, when he spoke to Verónica Román, a friend from Argentina. (Note: Another source states Tobares was speaking to his girlfriend.) While on the phone, Tobares explained that he was doing Gerardo a favor by driving a vehicle from Puerto Vallarta to Guadalajara and exchanging it for another of his boss' preference. He told Verónica that they were guiding him along the way, but said he did not know where he was, that he was scared, and that the whole situation seemed strange to him. That was the last thing Tobares said to Verónica.

Earlier before his disappearance, Tobares was in Puerto Vallarta, since there is record of him at 3 a.m. At 8 a.m., he met a man named Rogelio ("Rocky"), an Argentine, in Guadalajara. After that he met with a friend of González Valencia at a tobacco shop to discuss cooking plans for González Valencia's daughter's birthday party. Tobares was there until about 12:00 p.m. when the store security camera recorded him leaving. At 12:32 p.m., he made the phone call to Verónica, from a location which investigators have not revealed to the public. The family thinks that Gerardo set a trap for him. On 10 June, a co-worker and friend of Tobares went to the Mexican police to report his disappearance. The report was made in both Guadalajara and Puerto Vallarta. Tobares became the first Argentine to disappear in Mexico.

On 19 June, police officers discovered the vehicle that Tobares had been driving abandoned in La Piedad, Michoacán, a city 165 kilometres (103 mi) east of Guadalajara and close to the border with the states of Jalisco and Guanajuato. It had been left in a neighborhood close to the city centre; investigators said they did not find blood traces or signs of violence in the vehicle. They also stated that they could not find any evidence in the vehicle that could further clarify the case, and said they were searching for his girlfriend to clarify what she knew about Tobares prior to his disappearance.

As the vehicle was found in Michoacán, state authorities there began to work with Jalisco officials to try to locate Tobares. The vehicle was kept in Michoacán. On social media, Tobares' friends posted the pictures of the vehicle, a 2009 Dodge Caliber with San Luis Potosí state license plates. They stated that the vehicle was owned by a Colombian national (now publicly known to be Gerardo), who was also the owner of the restaurant where Tobares worked.

== Investigation ==
=== Leads and possible motives ===
On 14 June 2013, Jalisco authorities confirmed that they were officially opening an investigation to locate Tobares. (Note: The reason why Jalisco authorities took the case before federal ones was because the disappearance report was issued with state authorities first.) Argentine consular officials stated that they had filed a formal request to Jalisco authorities on 10 June and were collaborating with them. Tobares' friends told officials that he had been planning to visit Sayulita and Tepic, Nayarit. Investigators in Mexico and Argentina discarded two leads that were initially thought plausible. They do not believe that Tobares purposely decided to cut ties with his family and friends to disappear of his own free will. Tobares was looking for a new job in Guadalajara and had his passport and other legal documents ready, (Note: Some of his friends stated that Tobares had an interview lined up in Guadalajara, but it is not known with who.) which made investigators think that it was unlikely that Tobares would go into hiding or cut communication with those close to him.

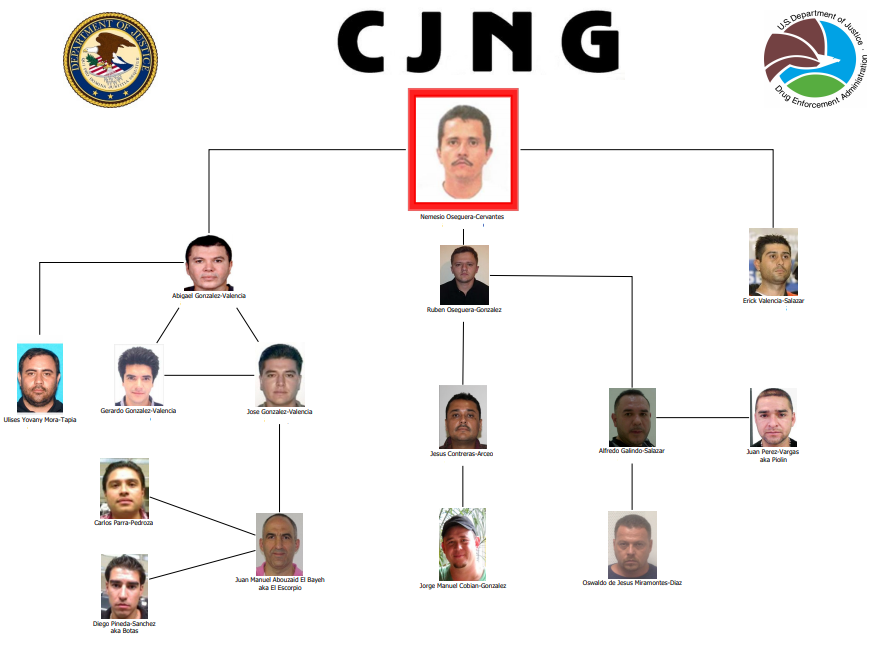
Chart displaying Gerardo González Valencia within the CJNG leadership chain

The other lead that was discarded was one that suggested that Tobares was kidnapped for ransom, mainly because his possible abductors have not reached out to his family for a payment. Investigators monitored Tobares' bank accounts to see if they were used after he went missing. Their analysis of his social media showed that his last activity was on Facebook, where Tobares made a profile picture change on 28 May, a few days before he went missing. Investigators believe that Tobares was probably hired as a cook by a drug lord for a party or event, without him knowing who he was cooking for. At some point, investigators surmised, Tobares might have seen something suspicious that put him in danger, or might have had a problem with someone at those private events. In addition, investigators concluded that rival gang members might have kidnapped Tobares to send a message to his employers, as part of a gang retaliation.

His family stated that Tobares' enthusiasm for work went down a few months before he disappeared. He told his sister that he was scared, and one time he called her sobbing. In March 2013, he spoke to his sister and told her that he wanted to return to Argentina. They believe that Tobares was kidnapped because he might have seen something suspicious while on the job that his employers did not want him to see. Tobares worked at Hotelito Desconocido and Nudoki Sushi Bar, but he was also a hired chef for private parties; his family told investigators that Tobares was sometimes taken by the CJNG, Tobares' last employer, to remote areas near beaches in western Mexico to cook for their exclusive events. He was not allowed to leave for a few days and was prohibited from using his cellphone while he was there. His family believes that at one of those private parties, Tobares saw something suspicious and began asking third-parties to clarify what he saw. When the CJNG found out what he was doing, Gerardo reportedly threatened him and told him to ask those question to his face. A week before his disappearance, Gerardo reportedly ordered Tobares to close down the sushi restaurant and fire all of the employees.

Tobares was quite active on Facebook, Instagram, and YouTube, and posted pictures and videos of his personal and work life on social media including trips to Jalisco, Michoacán, Guanajuato, Nayarit, Guerrero, Mexico City, and Teotihuacán. His pictures showed his work in hotels, upscale restaurants and yachts, and private parties. In 2011, Tobares posted a photo on his Facebook of a man washing the dishes with him in a restaurant's kitchen. The man was displaying a Colt Gold Cup .45 pistol tucked behind his pants. Several of his friends commented on the picture, and one advised him to be careful. In 2013, he posted a picture on his Instagram of a tattoo displaying a figure with a gas mask. In the description, Tobares stated that the tattoo was a gift from a "man who [was] of key importance in Culiacán, Sinaloa", but the text on social media was part of a narcocorrido, a Mexican drug ballad. (Note: Culiacán, Sinaloa, is often cited in narcocorridos given its historic importance in Mexican drug trafficking.) On YouTube, he posted videos of his travels through Jalisco's towns and highways.

== Aftermath ==
=== Reactions ===
A few days after his disappearance, the Argentine Embassy in Mexico City issued a communiqué with details of Tobares' disappearance and who they should reach out to if they discover any leads to his whereabouts. They stated that he was last seen in the Jardines del Bosque neighborhood of Guadalajara, that he was 1.77 m (5 ft 10 in) tall and approximately 82 kilograms (181 lb), has white skin, freckles, brown hair, and identifiable tattoos on his legs and shoulder. The Embassy stated that they were working with Jalisco's Ministry of Public Security, who were leading the investigation and keeping the Tobares family and consular authorities updated with any developments in the case.

On social media, family members and friends of Tobares created a Facebook page, "Encontremos A Federico Tobares" (English: Let's Find Federico Tobares), and regularly post updates of the investigation, images of Tobares' activities with his friends, and petitions to rally more people in the search. They have also posted several videos online asking people to help locate Tobares. On 14 June, Tobares' cousin Liza Bearzotti, who also served as the family's spokesperson for the case, spoke to Canal 5 Noticias on national television in Argentina to publicise the case.

=== Developments in the case ===
On 21 June, Tobares' sister Ana Soledad travelled to Mexico to help investigators locate her brother. She told the press she was working with Argentine ambassador Diego Alonso Garcés and the Mexican Federal Police on the case. She told the press on 23 June that the family had asked the Mexican National Human Rights Commission to carry out a "parallel" investigation since they wanted to prevent corruption from Mexican investigators. On 7 July, people in Guadalajara conducted a march for missing people in Jalisco that ended at the city's monument, La Minerva(in Spanish). Tobares' father thanked the organizers for carrying a photo of his son during the march.

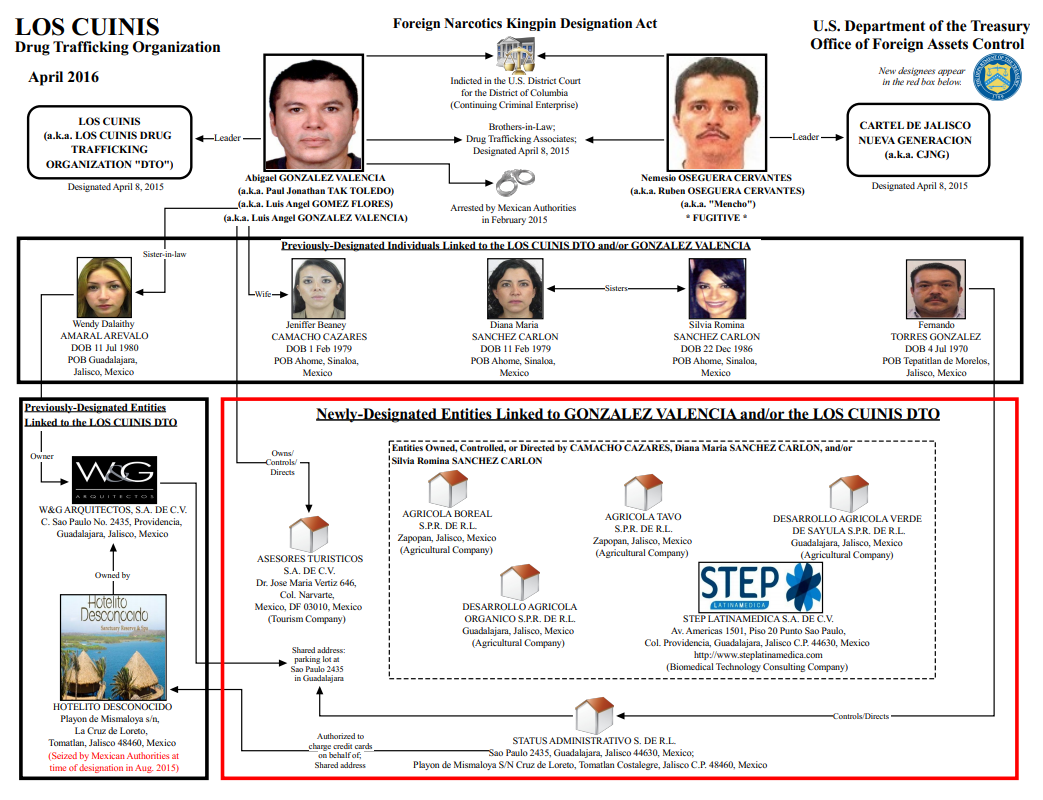
Chart released by the Office of Foreign Assets Control (OFAC) sanctioning Hotelito Desconocido

On 10 July, Bearzotti stated that Jalisco authorities were "disinterested" and were moving slowly in the case. She stated that their investigators took several days to act on the leads the family gave to them, thus harming their chances of finding Tobares since she believed that the first days of his disappearance were crucial for the investigation. Bearzotti told the press that Jalisco officials progressed the case the way the family wanted to see a month later after the Argentine and Mexican government pressured them to pick up the pace of the investigation. Tobares' sister Ana Soledad said she was shocked about the kidnappings and disappearances in Mexico, and thanked officials at the municipal, state, and federal level who were working on the case.

On 19 August 2015, the United States Treasury's Office of Foreign Assets Control sanctioned 15 Mexican businesses, including Hotelito Desconocido, under the Foreign Narcotics Kingpin Designation Act (also known as the Kingpin Act). According to the sanction, Hotelito Desconocido served as a money laundering front that provided financial and material assistance to Los Cuinis and their leader Abigael González Valencia (brother of Tobares' last employer Gerardo). All of Hotelito Desconocido's assets in the U.S. were frozen, and U.S. citizens were prohibited from doing business with it. The sanctions also extended to six Mexicans linked to Los Cuinis. That same day, following a formal request through the Secretariat of Finance and Public Credit and exchange of information with U.S. officials, Mexican federal agents (PGR) confiscated Hotelito Desconocido and closed it down.

On 21 April 2016, Gerardo was arrested by the National Police of Uruguay in Montevideo, Uruguay. He was arrested following an extensive money laundering investigation between Latin American officials and the U.S. government that linked him to several shell companies he used to purchase assets in the Americas and overseas. This information was discovered in 2015 through the massive information leak known as the Panama Papers. Following his arrest, Tobares' family spoke to the press and talked about the investigation. They said they had encountered problems in Mexico when the Argentine consular authorities were rotated and new personnel took over the case.

In an effort to continue their search, they tried to increase their activity on social media, but they said that some people (who they suspect worked for Gerardo) told them that Tobares was with them or that they had seen him alive in Mexico. Ana Soledad said she was told that Gerardo was once in Argentina and wanted to speak to her, but she refused. "We just want to know where he is so we can bring him home, with his people, with his friends he loved and loved him. We do not want to know who took him. We just want to know, even anonymously, where he is," she said.

As of 2019, although the Mexican government has promised to create reliable databases, many bodies discovered near Guadalajara have not been identified.

== See also ==
- List of people who disappeared mysteriously (2000–present)
- Mexican drug war

== Sources ==
- Adams, Fiona (2011). CultureShock!: A Survival Guide to Customs and Etiquette. Argentina. Marshall Cavendish. p. 252. ISBN 978-0761460503.
- Polit Dueñas, Gabriela (2012). Narrating Narcos: Culiacán and Medellín. University of Pittsburgh Press. p. 240. ISBN 978-0822979098.
