= Harbor - Gold League =

High school athletic league in California, USA

The Harbor - Gold League is a high school athletic league that is part of the CIF Southern Section. The league does not support football.

== Schools ==
- Price High School
- Renaissance Academy
- Firebaugh High School
- Ribet Academy
- San Gabriel Academy
