= Robert Henning =

American politician

Mayor of Lynwood
- In office January 1990 – November 1991
- Preceded by: Evelyn Wells
- Succeeded by: Louis J. Heine
- In office December 1985 – December 2, 1986
- Preceded by: John Byork
- Succeeded by: Evelyn Wells (acting) then Paul Richards

City Council of Lynwood
- In office December 1, 1983 – November 1991
- Succeeded by: Louis Byrd

Personal details
- Born: 1943/1944; California
- Died: August 2015
- Education: B.A. California State University, Los Angeles

Robert Henning (1943/1944 – August 2015) is an American politician who served as the first African-American mayor of Lynwood, California.

== Biography ==
Henning graduated with a B.A. in sociology from California State University, Los Angeles. He works as an unemployment insurance adjudication management supervisor for the state Employment Development Department branch office in Compton. In 1978, he moved to Lynwood and ran for a seat on the City Council of Lynwood but lost by 115 votes.

In November 1983, he was narrowly elected (by 120 votes) to the 5-member City Council of Lynwood, the first African-American elected to hold the position. In 1985, he was named vice mayor. Although Lynwood had been historically white, an influx of Blacks and later Hispanics had shifted its racial mix to majority minority. By 1986, Lynwood was 43% Latino, 35% black and 20% white. In November 1985, another African-American was elected to the City Council, Evelyn Wells, who also was the first woman elected to the council in 20 years. Wells promptly nominated him as mayor and in December 1985, the City Council appointed him as mayor of Lynwood, the first African-American to hold the position, succeeding John Byork. After the November 1986 election, Black control of the City Council was solidified after the addition of Paul Richards. On December 2, 1986, the council deadlocked 2-2 on appointing his successor, the result of the absence of councilmember John Byork who was absent due to pneumonia. They also deadlocked in agreeing to extend the date for the vote so Byork could return. Henning who supported his council ally and mayor pro tem, Evelyn Wells, resigned on the same day making Wells acting mayor, the first Black woman to hold the office in Lynwood. On December 16, 1986, Byork returned and the full council voted 3-1 for Paul Richards as mayor (Henning abstained, Wells voting against, and Richards, Byork, and council member E.L. Morris voted for the nomination). Although she relinquished the gavel, Wells physically refused to give up the center seat as historically, the mayor pro tem served as the next mayor stating that she was not chosen because she was a woman.

In January 1990, he was unanimously named as mayor of Lynwood with Paul Richards as mayor pro tem. In January 1991, he was named mayor for another term by a 3-2 vote (Henning, Evelyn Wells, and new council member Armando Rea voting for the nomination while Paul Richards and Louis Heine dissented); Rea was named as mayor pro tem.

In the November 5, 1991 election, Henning was defeated by newcomer Louis Byrd for a seat on the City Council and resigned the mayorship prematurely in mid-November (his term was officially set to expire on December 3, 1991). The remaining councilmembers (Armando Rea, Evelyn Wells, and Paul Richards) voted in fellow councilmember Louis J. Heine as mayor.

Henning died in August 2015.

== See also ==
- List of first African-American mayors
- African American mayors in California
