= Gerardo González Valencia =

Mexican convicted drug lord

- Born: c. 1976; Aguililla, Michoacán, Mexico
- Employer(s): Los Cuinis; Jalisco New Generation Cartel
- Criminal charges: Drug trafficking; money laundering
- Criminal penalty: Life in prison
- Criminal status: Convicted
- Spouse: Wendy Dalaithy Amaral Arévalo
- Relatives: Abigael González Valencia (sibling)

Gerardo González Valencia (Spanish pronunciation: [xe'ɾaɾdo ɣon'sales βa'lensja]; born c. 1976) is a Mexican convicted drug lord and high-ranking member of the Jalisco New Generation Cartel (CJNG), a criminal group based in Jalisco. He is part of a clan that heads a CJNG money laundering branch known as Los Cuinis. He was responsible for coordinating international money laundering schemes by using shell companies to purchase assets in Latin America, Europe, and Asia. His wife Wendy Dalaithy Amaral Arévalo was reportedly working with him on this large money laundering scheme when the couple moved from Mexico to Uruguay in 2011.

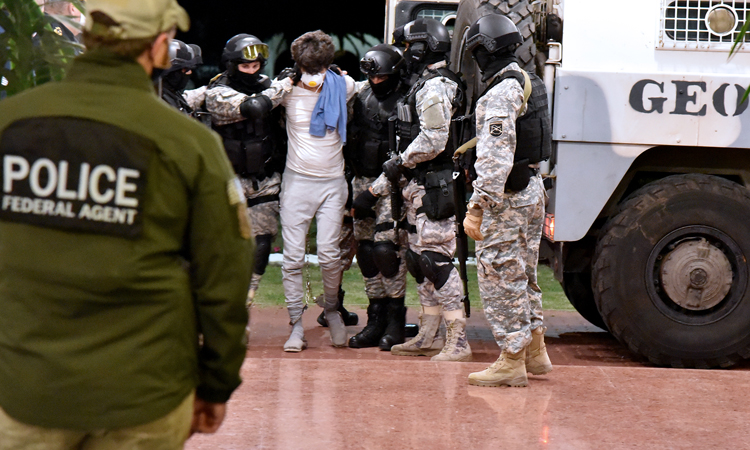
Gerardo González Valencia being extradited from Uruguay to the U.S on May 14, 2020

The original documents of the investigation framing González Valencia were leaked in 2015 through the Panama Papers, where it detailed real estate transactions and industrial sector investments tied to him. After a multi-year investigation by Latin American officials and the U.S. Department of the Treasury, González Valencia was arrested in Montevideo, Uruguay, in April 2016, and imprisoned for money laundering charges. He was wanted by the U.S. District Court for the District of Columbia for conspiracy to distribute cocaine and methamphetamine. In May 2020, he was extradited to the U.S. and sentenced to life imprisonment in July 2023.

== Early life ==
Gerardo González Valencia was probably born in 1976, (Note: Following his arrest in 2016, sources stated he was 40. Another source published a fake passport that had his name as Alonso Torres Ibarra from Jalisco and his date of birth as 31 July 1976.) but sources disagree on his exact place of birth. A Uruguayan newspaper stated he was born in the United States and holds a Mexican citizenship. A Mexican newspaper states he was born in Aguilillia, Michoacán, Mexico. His parents were J. Abigael González Mendoza (father) and Estela Valencia Farías (mother). (Note: Other sources state that Estela Valencia Farías may be González Valencia's half sister. She was described as older than the rest of his siblings.)

He has several aliases, including Lalo, Silverio, Silver, Flaco, Eduardo, and Laline. According to the Mexican government, the González Valencia clan was made up of 18 siblings. The males are Abigael, José María, Arnulfo, Ulises Jovani, Elvis, Édgar Edén, Mauricio, Gerardo, José and Luis Ángel. (Note: Ulises Jovani is sometimes spelled as Ulises Giovanni.) The females are Rosalinda (also known as Rosalía), Noemí, Berenice, Marisa Ivette, María Elena, Érika and Abigaíl. People in their hometown in Michoacán nicknamed the clan "Cuinis" in reference to a squirrel from the area that is known as "Cuinique" (spermophilus adocetus). It is common for this squirrel to have over a dozen babies each time the mother gives birth.

In the 1990s, González Valencia was accused by a U.S. court of drug trafficking in California. His brother Abigael González Valencia (alias "El Cuini") and his in-law Nemesio Oseguera Cervantes (alias "El Mencho"), who spent few years in prison in the U.S., were also charged with drug trafficking in the U.S. in that decade. Since January 2003, González Valencia was reportedly responsible for distributing and/or using intermediaries to knowingly distribute at least 5 kilograms (11 lb) of cocaine and 500 grams (18 oz) methamphetamine to the U.S. In the indictment, sworn by a grand jury on 5 May 2015, the United States District Court for the District of Columbia stated that they would seize any drug proceeds that derived from this criminal conspiracy, or seek to forfeit assets equal to that total value.

== Criminal career ==
=== Time in Argentina ===
González Valencia's envoys were detected in Argentina in 2009 when they moved to Puerto Madero, Buenos Aires. Argentinian officials also uncovered that they created an entity in Buenos Aires and opened a supermarket chain. The investigation started on 10 March 2009, when three Mexican nationals posing as tourists were driving a Chevrolet Astra and got involved in a car accident with another driver in Puerto Madero. The Mexicans were living in Torres Le Parc Puerto Madero, an upscale complex in the city. The Argentine Naval Prefecture got involved in the incident, but the three Mexicans threatened the officers and told them that in Mexico they would be dead for getting involved with them. The officers took note of the license plates of the vehicle before the Mexican nationals left.

Upon further investigation, they discovered that the Chevrolet Astra was owned by an Argentinian strawperson from Ituzaingó, Buenos Aires, and that the jurisdiction thus fell to officials in Morón, Buenos Aires. Officials in Morón began investigating the Mexican nationals and discovered that there was a suspicious entity, Círculo Internacional S.A., that served as a bar and café store. The Drug Enforcement Administration (DEA) provided evidence to the investigators that the Mexican nationals were likely linked to the Sinaloa Cartel, but the Morón officials were not able to continue the investigation successfully.

On 9 September 2009, the three Mexicans inaugurated a convenience chain store, Corner, in Puerto Madero. The project included plans to open 15 stores with a US$2.5 million investment. They also bought a large storage facility and two other stores in Congreso and Microcentro that did not open. In mid-2010, (Note: According to one source, the Mexican nationals fled Argentina in 2012.) however, the three individuals fled Argentina after the U.S. Office of Foreign Assets Control (OFAC) identified that one of Círculo Internacional S.A.'s sister companies, Círculo Comercial Total de Productos S.A., had invested millions of dollars to the Argentinian entity from Mexico with drug proceeds from Los Cuinis. (Note: Another source states that it was Círculo Mundial.) Investigators later discovered that the three men worked with González Valencia.

He arrived in Argentina the following year and managed Círculo Internacional S.A. He lived at Hotel Faena and sent his three children to a private school in the northern part of the city, and investigators discovered that he paid 6 months of tuition in advance in cash. Círculo Internacional S.A. received about US$1.8 million sums as paid-in capital and deposited them at Banco de la Nación Argentina. Investigators believe that the money originally came from Los Cuinis. Argentinian authorities investigated if Los Cuinis had bought assets in the provinces of Buenos Aires, Entre Ríos, Salta, and Corrientes.

=== Relocation in Uruguay ===
González Valencia and his family arrived to Uruguay in late 2011. They relocated because they wanted to live in a country where people would not recognize them. According to one of González Valencia's sons, his family left Mexico after they were threatened to death by a group of masked gunmen who entered their house to allegedly kill them. In Mexico, González Valencia reportedly owned a restaurant ran by Federico Tobares, an Argentinian chef who years later disappeared. Mexican investigators suspected that González Valencia was behind his disappearance.

In Uruguay, the family bought a mansion known as "Quincho Grande" in an upscale neighborhood in the resort city Punta del Este, Maldonado. The property was 15,052 square metres (162,020 sq ft) and was bought at US$2 million. (Note: In 2016, the year González Valencia was arrested, the house was worth US$3.5 million.) The mansion had two houses, a pool, garage, laundry room, and a tennis and football field. A few months later, he bought several expensive cars, including two Audis and a Land Rover, and land lots in Punta Ballena and in other parts of Uruguay. González Valencia told residents at Punta del Este that he was from Mexico and that hunting was his profession. He enrolled his students at a private school there and tried to live a seemingly ordinary lifestyle like other wealthy residents from the area. He did not hide his luxurious lifestyle and was seen by residents driving expensive vehicles.

To launder his money, González Valencia worked through the Panamanian law firm Mossack Fonseca, which created two shell companies on his behalf: Montella Global S.A. and Deltodo Enterprises. (Note: Deltodo Enterprises is also spelled as Del Todo Enterprise.) These two companies purchased assets in Uruguay by working through Asesores y Consultores del Sur Ltda. (Asconsur), consulting company in Montevideo that worked as their intermediary. Their main point of contact in Asconsur was Gianella Guarino Anfossi. Montella Global S.A. bought several real estate properties and made investments in this sector. Deltodo Enterprises bought industrial properties in Russia and China. Deltodo also intended to sell craft tequila in Mexico, though this project failed. This information was released through the Panama Papers, a massive document leak that detailed information of offshore entities, on 15 April 2015. Both González Valencia and his wife Wendy Dalaithy Amaral Arévalo were mentioned in the Panama Papers as having ties to both entities.

González Valencia and Amaral Arévalo were first mentioned in a document on 17 January 2012, when Verónica Corbo from Asconsur reached out to Mossack Fonseca asking them for a list of companies to purchase and the costs of transactions. The law firm responded the same day with a list of ten potential companies, including Montella Global S.A. On 26 January, Guarino pressured Mossack Fonseca to legalize purchases in Punta del Este because their client was looking to buy assets there and the Uruguayan government would require such approvals. After the process delayed, Asconsur reached out again on 6 February for an update. The purchases were finally approved the following day. González Valencia received a passport that approved his relationship with both entities.

In September 2012, Guarino asked Mossack Fonseca to sign a petition to provide legal assistant to González Valencia if he ever needed it. A month later, she asked the law firm if they could extend the legal protection to Panama so that González Valencia could purchase assets there. Mossack Fonseca stated that González Valencia was able to do that using Montella Global S.A. On 15 June, Guarino reached out to Mossack Fonseca again and asked them for a list of active companies under the law firm. In October, Asconsur communicated with Mossack Fonseca that González Valencia wanted to transfer the shares of his entities to Héctor Amaral Padilla, his father-in-law, of Mexican citizenship.

In December, the couple decided to see if they could purchase assets in Panama using their Uruguayan entities. Mossack Fonseca responded to them on 3 January 2013, with a list of seven Panamanian firms: Seaside Company, Clarisse Company, Amanecer Enterprises, Deltodo Enterprises, Delirio Business, Vani Business, and Tarima Holding. On 10 September, Valeria Martino from Asconsur confirmed that they would proceed to purchase Deltodo Enterprises and put González Valencia and Amaral Arévalo as the owners. On 13 September, Guarino sent Mossack Fonseca a document confirming that she had done her due diligence in the know your customer process. In August 2015, a legal document showed that his father-in-law shared the same address as González Valencia in Punta del Este. In November, Asconsur filed a final request to transfer the assets owned by Montella Global S.A. in Uruguay to Gonzalez Valencia's father-in-law (he was the legal owner of this entity). Mossack Fonseca responded to Asconsur that since Amaral Padilla was the owner of Montella Global S.A., the changes would take place.

==== Investigation tightens ====
On 19 August 2015, the day the United States Department of the Treasury sanctioned several members of Los Cuinis, including González Valencia's wife, Uruguayan officials started a covert investigation against the couple. They discovered that Amaral Arévalo had a domestic bank account through HSBC and had firms in both Uruguay and Panama. She was the legal owner of a Panamanian company known as Montella Global S.A. She also served as an attorney of another company, Tossa del Mar S.A., and as director for Dalaithy S.A. Several Uruguayan assets were bought on behalf of these entities. The Department of the Treasury also discovered she managed Hotelito Desconocido in Tomatlán, Jalisco; W&G Arquitectos in Tepatitlán, Jalisco; and HD Collection S.A. de C.V. in the State of Mexico. (Note: The Department of the Treasury believes that W&G Arquitectos bought Hotelito Desconocido in 2007 using illegal funds.) All were considered laundering fronts for Los Cuinis.

Over the course of 2015, investigators gathered evidences against the two through electronic surveillance, videos, uncover agents, and eyewitnesses. They later discovered that González Valencia and his family had lived in Buenos Aires years back but had visited Uruguay sporadically until they moved there permanently in 2011. His last immigration record was in 2014, when González Valencia was detected leaving to Brazil with his family through Aceguá, Cerro Largo. Besides González Valencia, his wife and three children, investigators learned that the family brought their Mexican nannies and maternal grandparents to Uruguay for several months. Investigators discovered that González Valencia did not have a formal job or domestic bank accounts. The money he received came directly from Mexico in cash since there were no recorded transactions between international banks that tracked down his name. Uruguayan officials believed that the nature of these activities were signs of the funds probably originating from drug trafficking proceeds from Los Cuinis and the Jalisco New Generation Cartel (CJNG).

In March 2016, Uruguayan officials learned that the U.S. government had issued an international arrest warrant with intent for extradition against González Valencia for allegedly importing cocaine and methamphetamine to the U.S. As the investigation grew in Uruguay, officials discovered that González Valencia was reportedly laundering millions of dollars through a businessman in Piriápolis, Maldonado. This contact met the couple frequently at their residence and in other social gatherings, and offered González Valencia several properties for him to buy in Punta Ballena. He was also suspected of helping González Valencia sell and buy foreign and national currency. These transactions were made in an exchange house in Piriápolis (close to Pan de Azúcar, Maldonado), where investigators saw González Valencia and his wife on several occasions. The Piriápolis contact was also recorded making a delivery of US$20,000 to González Valencia's father-in-law at the exchange house.

According to the telephone recordings, González Valencia and his close associates referred to Punta del Este as "Tumba" and Montevideo as "Big Tumba" or "Big City". In Montevideo, investigators discovered that González Valencia met with the Piriápolis contact on several occasions. Amaral Arévalo left to the Mexican city of Guadalajara, Jalisco, in early 2016, but planned to return to Uruguay after two months. (Note: She later confirmed that she left Uruguay to take care of some legal issues in Mexico.) When his wife was gone, González Valencia made frequent visits to Montevideo to see his children, who were enrolled at Scuola Italiana, a private school in the capital in Carrasco, Montevideo, for the calendar year. To avoid the long drives from Punta del Este, he decided to move to the city and be closer to his children. He stayed at a hotel while he looked for a home to buy. The investigation reached its final phases when the police discovered that González Valencia was planning to leave the country with a forged identity. The publication of the Panama Papers just a few days before also accelerated the urgency of law enforcement to prevent González Valencia from fleeing. (Note: The police wire tapped one of his telephone conversations and heard him say he would pick up his kids and leave Uruguay.) They then carried out an operation to apprehend him and his close associates in Montevideo.

== Arrest ==
On 21 April 2016, González Valencia abandoned his room at a hotel in Punta Carretas, Montevideo, to pick-up his children at their private school. When he left the hotel, the police started to follow his tracks, but the traffic impeded them from making a move to try and apprehend him. González Valencia had packed his children's school material and as well as valuable family possessions. Investigators believe that González Valencia was planning on leaving the country and take his family to Brazil since he had been there before on several occasions. The reason why he did not flee from Uruguay immediately was because his wife was in Mexico, and he was waiting for her to arrive before departing.

At around 6 pm, the officers of the National Police of Uruguay and the department for the Suppression of Illegal Drug Trafficking arrested González Valencia, his father-in-law, and nine other suspects. González Valencia tried to escape but was quickly apprehended. When he was about to get arrested, he destroyed his iPhone by throwing it on the ground. (Note: Another source states he broke his iPhone with his hands.) He was not armed at the moment of his arrest. On 23 April, Amaral Arévalo was arrested by anti-narcotics agents at the Carrasco International Airport after returning from Mexico. She said she had returned to Uruguay to pick up her three children and take them to Guadalajara, Mexico. The children were taken to the Uruguayan Institute for Children and Adolescents by the police, and were later put in custody of their aunt who came to Uruguay from Mexico with Amaral Arévalo. The children later went back to Mexico.

On 25 April, Uruguayan officials broke into González Valencia's mansion. At the scene, authorities confiscated 45 cellphones (one was a satellite phone), 7 tablet computers, 9 laptops and weapons. (Note: The satellite phone was used by González Valencia to communicate with people outside of Uruguay without being detected.) The police seized several possessions inside the property, including furniture and jewelry. The police discovered that there was a fake wall adorned with drawings of González Valencia's children hung on it. Behind the wall was an empty safe box. In one of the computers, the police retrieved photos of his family during a hunting trip in Africa.

== Imprisonment ==
A few days after their arrests, González Valencia was charged for money laundering in a court along with his wife and five other suspects. Investigators alleged that González Valencia successfully laundered over US$10 million in Uruguay. They concluded that this money laundering scheme was the biggest one in the history of Uruguay. Mexican sources described him as the second-in-command in Los Cuinis, just below his brother Abigael (alias "El Cuini"), who was arrested on 28 February 2015, in Mexico. (Note: Other sources described him as the top leader of Los Cuinis because he took command of the group following his brother's arrest.) His wife Amaral Arévalo was described as a key suspect in the case for reportedly heading several of the laundering businesses for Los Cuinis.

On 29 April 2016, he was transferred to a newly built facilities in Comcar, a maximum-security prison in Montevideo. He was in an individual cell and only had one hour of recreation time in the prison's patio, but that hour was reserved only for him because the prison authorities did not want for him to socialize with the other inmates. He was allowed to read books and have a notebook. González was sent to prison along with his father-in-law, two gardeners from Punta del Este who facilitated his money laundering schemes, (Note: According to investigators, the two gardeners agreed to put González Valencia's vehicles under their name to avoid bringing suspicions against him.) and his contact from Piriápolis. In June 2016, prison authorities carried out an investigation inside the cells and discovered that González Valencia was in possession of an undisclosed amount of white powder, adobe, and salt. When questioned where he got these ingredients, he stated that they were already in his cell when he got there.

Federal authorities investigated the prison guards because they believed that if González Valencia was able to smuggle these items, then that meant that there was a chance that he could smuggle a satellite cellphone to communicate with members of Los Cuinis. They also worried about the possibility of prison guards forming relationships with the inmates, especially when money is involved. González Valencia told the press that he was tortured in below freezing temperatures by several prison guards when he was asked to give his legal declaration. He then issued a verbal death threat against Ministry of Interior Eduardo Bonomi, and told him that he would hang him from a bridge if the prison guards continue to torture him. (Note: González Valencia made this comment in his first days of being in prison. He later apologized for the statements.) That same month, Mexican officials arrived in Montevideo to talk to their Uruguayan counterparts on the case, particularly on the role of Los Cuinis and González Valencia in Uruguay. In July, a federal judge ordered Amaral Arévalo's released from prison.

In September, González Valencia was transferred to a police jail along with his father-in-law. This decision was made after authorities considered that he might escape from prison or that someone might potentially hurt him. While in prison at Comcar, he developed ties with the prison gangs. Investigators saw that he developed a partnership with inmate Luis Alberto "Betito" Suárez, (Note: Suárez was released from prison in March 2017 after completing his sentence.) once Uruguay's most-wanted criminal, and that he was distributing money with other prisoners to gain protection or buy out his escape. That same month, Amaral Arévalo got approved by a federal court to see her children in Mexico. She paid a US$25,000 fine and was given a 6-month travel permit to come in and out of Uruguay. Her defense stated that she would not flee indefinitely because her children are in Mexico and her husband and father are imprisoned in Uruguay.

On 27 June 2018, Uruguayan officials requested a judge to begin in trial in Uruguay for González Valencia's criminal charges. They asked the judge to consider giving him four years in prison for money laundering charges. In addition, they said that his wife and father-in-law should receive two years, though these two individuals were not in custody at the time this verbal request was made.

On 11 March 2020, the González Valencia defense issued a habeas corpus and argued that their client was suffering from "inhumane" treatment in prison. In the complaint, González Valencia detailed that he was not allowed to have visitors and that prison guards did not let him sleep. He also argued that his cell had video camera surveillance 24/7 and that he was not fed properly. González Valencia suffered from celiac disease, making him unable to eat gluten, and complained that the prison food did not meet his medical needs. The treatments were "illegitimate and similar to torture", he argued.

Judge Adriana Chamsarián rejected the habeas corpus of González Valencia. The judge considered that there was no evidence that there were "conditions of confinement that violated human dignity", as González Valencia had alleged in the habeas corpus. Uruguay's Organized Crime prosecutor, Luis Pacheco, asked Chamsarián to dismiss Gonzalez Valencia's proposal, although he recommended that the Ministry of the Interior follow a clear visitation regime. It asked the prison to allow González Valencia's family members to bring him food - something that was previously denied - and that González Valencia not be recorded when attending medical examination. During the habeas corpus process, the Ministry of the Interior asked the judge not to transfer the inmate to court hearings since authorities feared he could escape. For this reason, a videoconference hearing was held. In González Valencia's second hearing, the prosecutor and the judge went to jail to visit him.

On April 8, 2020, González Valencia was transferred to the Libertad penitentiary. Uruguayan officials stated that they were preparing for his U.S. extradition and that they did this because it was a "penitentiary policy". The transfer was approved by the Ministry of Interior.

== Extradition process ==
On 16 June 2016, the U.S. government issued an extradition request against González Valencia. The request was sent to the Embassy of the United States in Montevideo and then to the Ministry of Foreign Relations. From there it was transferred to the Supreme Court of Uruguay, where it reached a federal judge's hands. In the request, it stated that González Valencia was wanted for murder and drug trafficking charges in California since the 1990s. Uruguayan officials stated that keeping González Valencia in jail posed a risk because their prestige was in line. Authorities worried that having him in prison increased chances of propelling Los Cuinis to orchestrate his escape. In his extradition hearing, González Valencia stated that he favored the possibility of being extradited to the U.S. for his charges because he would be closer to his family in Mexico.

On 22 February 2017, the U.S. government formalized the petition to have him extradited. On 14 March, Uruguayan authorities stated they were analyzing González Valencia's legal status for his possible extradition to the U.S. The prosecution stated that they would reach out to González Valencia's defense and asked if he wanted an immediate extradition. If González Valencia denied the extradition request, Uruguayan authorities would have to analyze if the U.S. request fulfills the country's legal requirements for extradition and have González Valencia face trial in Uruguay first before sending him to the U.S. Money laundering in Uruguay is penalized with up to 15 years in prison. If the Uruguayan government chooses this route, he would then be extradited to the U.S. after the conclusion of his sentence for his pending drug trafficking charges.

On 2 May 2017, the extradition hearing date was pushed after González Valencia's defense requested more time to review the case. Argentine officials also asked the Uruguayan government to seize his all assets in Uruguay. They also filed a petition to have González Valencia and his collaborators investigated in Argentina for money laundering since several of the assets they purchased in Uruguay came from Argentine proceeds. González Valencia told his defense that he was unsure if he wanted to be extradited to the U.S. (he had previously mentioned that he wanted to go to the U.S. to be closer to his family).

On 31 May 2017, González Valencia's lawyers presented two reasons why their client should not be extradited to the U.S. In their first rationale, they stated that the statute of limitations for his crimes in the U.S. had passed since they claimed it only lasted 5 years. They also stated that González Valencia should not be extradited to the U.S. because he could face the death penalty or life imprisonment. Uruguayan law prohibits extraditions in cases where the person extradited may face harsher sentences than they would for the crime they committed in Uruguay.

=== Approval process ===
On 22 June 2017, Uruguayan officials from the Prosecutor's Office Against Organized Crime accepted to have González Valencia extradited to the U.S. after facing trial in Uruguay. The judge, however, stated that in order to have him extradited, the U.S. government had to guarantee that González Valencia would not face death penalty, life imprisonment, or an equivalent punishment that is harsher than the ones under Uruguayan law. González Valencia's legal team in the U.S. stated that the U.S. government was considering life imprisonment prior to the request from Uruguay.

On 5 September 2017, the Uruguayan government agreed to accept the U.S.'s extradition request González Valencia without facing trial in Uruguay. As soon as the decision was finalized, his defense was given 10 days to appeal the decision. They told the press they would appeal it. If the extradition request remains firm, the U.S. government would need 40 days to accept the conditions established by the Uruguayan government. Among them was to accept the condition that González Valencia would be released from prison temporarily or be granted indefinite liberty in Uruguay so he can reach the U.S. González Valencia's defense said they would appeal the extradition request, and clarified that the charges against him in the U.S. where based out of the United States District Court for the District of Columbia. They commented he was not wanted for murder, as previously stated, and that González Valencia would agree to the extradition if his defense reached an agreement with U.S. officials.

On 14 March 2018, Uruguayan authorities questioned González Valencia for a fake passport he owned under an assumed alias, after he declared he had one in his possession. His defense stated he used the passport to disguise himself and not be linked to his family. They clarified that González Valencia was not involved to organized crime like several of his siblings, and that he left to Uruguay to be far away from them. They also stated that González Valencia did not use that passport in Uruguay, for which he should not be charged for it there.

On 2 October 2018, an appeals court of the Judiciary of Uruguay confirmed González Valencia's extradition to the U.S. On 16 October, the United States Department of State, Justice, and Treasury announced a joint law enforcement measure against the CJNG, and publicized previously sealed indictments charging González Valencia for his organized crime involvement. The appeals court notified González Valencia of their decision on 26 October, and stated that his defense had until 8 November to repeal the result at the Supreme Court of Uruguay. The defense's case was headed by two lawyers from Maldonado, Gabriela Gómez and Ana Audiffred; González Valencia's previous lawyer Víctor della Valle stepped down.

On 19 November 2018, González Valencia's defense issued their last extradition appeal at the Supreme Court of Uruguay. They explained that the U.S. government based the extradition request on a 1973 treaty between the U.S. and Uruguay, which stated that criminals were extraditable if they were on trial or convicted in the U.S. They claimed this did not apply to González Valencia's legal situation, and that the U.S. government should have used a 1991 agreement instead, which permits extradition for criminals being investigated. In addition, the defense stated that the 2007 crimes he was accused of in the U.S. have reached their statute of limitations since 2013.

On 13 February 2020, Supreme Court of Justice confirmed the extradition to the U.S. (under certain conditions) of González Valencia. The first condition stated that he would not be extradited until he fulfills his sentence and is released from Uruguayan custody. The second condition was that he should not be tried for crimes other than those referred to in the extradition request, except for two paragraphs of the extradition treaty between both countries. The third and final condition was that González Valencia should not be sentenced to death or life imprisonment if found guilty.

On 16 April 2020, the U.S. government agreed that González Valencia would not face double jeopardy and that he would not be sentenced to death. However, they said they would not agree to the life imprisonment clause because it was a stipulated requirement in their extradition treaty. Since González Valencia already fulfilled his money laundering sentence in Uruguay, there was a possibility of him being released if a deal between both countries was not made. On 29 April, however, the Uruguayan government confirmed that González Valencia was extradition-ready.

=== Extradition and sentence ===
On 14 May 2020, González Valencia was transferred from prison to the Carrasco International Airport and was flown to the U.S. under heavy security. He was sentenced to life in prison in July 2023 after he pleaded guilty to drug trafficking.

== See also ==
- Mexican drug war
