= Patty Rodriguez =

American entrepreneur, producer, radio personality and author

- Born: Los Angeles, California, United States
- Years active: 2006–present
- Known for: Social media influencer, radio personality, author, motivational speaker
- Notable work: On Air With Ryan Seacrest; Lil' Libros; MALA by Patty Rodriguez #selenaquintanillaforMAC

Patty Rodriguez is an American entrepreneur, producer, radio personality and best-selling author. Rodriguez is co-founder of Lil' Libros, a bilingual children's publishing company, and founder of the MALA by Patty Rodriguez jewellery line. She is currently senior producer of On Air with Ryan Seacrest, In 2016, Rodriguez led a grassroots campaign that convinced MAC Cosmetics to create a collection honouring the late Tejano superstar Selena Quintanilla.

== Early life ==
Rodriguez was born in Los Angeles to Mexican immigrants. At a young age she lived in a crowded apartment in East L.A. before moving to Lynwood, California.

She was a student at Lynwood High School when she was interning for the KIIS-FM radio station in Burbank, California.

== Career ==
In her senior year of High School, Rodriguez heard a KIIS-FM promo for a new internship to work on Rick Dees' morning show. Rodriguez, who was only 17 at the time, skipped school and drove over to successfully interview for the position.

Rodriguez was designated to promotions on KIIS-FM's promotions and digital team and became an assistant producer on the recently formed Ryan Seacrest morning show.

=== On Air with Ryan Seacrest ===
Since 2006, Rodriguez has been a member of the On Air team, and she hosts the popular Ryan's Roses segment. She currently works as the show's senior producer, making connections between her love of music, her Latin heritage and celebrity culture with her personal life. Rodriguez has also been able to use her platform on the radio to grow her social media brand and become a social media influencer.

=== MALA by Patty Rodriguez ===
In 2014, Rodriguez leveraged her social media influence to launch a popular jewelry line " MALA" inspired by her Mexican-American roots.

MALA by Patty Rodriguez has been worn by celebrities including Miley Cyrus, Rihanna, Gina Rodriguez and Vanessa Bryant.

=== Lil' Libros ===
After being rejected by several traditional children's publishing companies, Rodriguez decides to collaborate with her childhood best friend Ariana Stein to what now is Lil' Libros .

In 2018, the company released on a children's biography picture book on legendary Tejano singer Selena Quintanilla. The book was an instant success rising to No. 1 on Amazon's best seller 24 hours after its release. The company's other popular titles include Counting With – Contando Con Frida, a book inspired by Mexican artist Frida Kahlo and Lil' Loteria, a bilingual board game based on the Mexican bingo game Loteria.

=== Other Ventures ===
In 2017, Rodriguez gave a TEDx talk at Cal State Los Angeles on the importance of representation and role models in art, literature and entertainment in communities of color.

Rodriguez was the leading force behind a successful grassroots campaign to get MAC Cosmetics to launch a celebrity makeup brand inspired by Selena Quintanilla. After several years of getting rejection emails from MAC corporate, Rodriguez started an online petition that racked up more than 40,000 signatures and led to the announcement in July 2016 of the signature Selena by MAC line of makeup.

== Personal life ==
Rodriguez has two sons, whom serve as the inspiration for many of the Lil' Libros titles.

== Awards ==
LA Times Latinos De Hoy Cultural Influencer Award (2016)

Ford's Latina On the Move Award (2016)

Hispanic Public Relations Association Social Media Influencer of the Year (2017)

Latina magazine's Top 100 Women of The Year (2017)
