= Paul Richards (California politician) =

American politician

Paul H. Richards, II
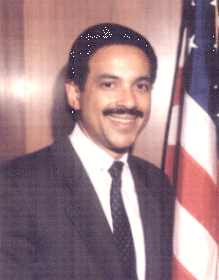

Mayor of Lynwood
- In office December 2000 – December 2001
- Preceded by: Louis Byrd
- Succeeded by: Arturo Reyes
- In office December 1992 – December 1998
- Preceded by: Louis J. Heine
- Succeeded by: Armando Rea
- In office December 16, 1986 – January 1989
- Preceded by: Evelyn Wells (acting) then Robert Henning
- Succeeded by: Evelyn Wells

City Council of Lynwood
- In office December 1986 – October 2003
- Preceded by: Louis Thompson
- Succeeded by: Maria Teresa Santillan

Personal details
- Born: 1955 or 1956 (age 70–71) California
- Education: B.A. California State University, Dominguez Hills
- Criminal information
- Status: Released
- Criminal charges: Honest services mail fraud; mail fraud; extortion; money laundering; making a false statement to government investigators
- Penalty: 14 years in federal prison

Paul H. Richards, II (born 1955/1956) is an American politician who is a former mayor of Lynwood, California. He was sentenced to federal prison in 2006 on federal bribery and kickback charges.

== Early life and education ==
Born in California, Richards attended Compton High School, where he was ASB President. He also served an internship with the Model Cities Program. He attended California State University, Dominguez Hills, earning his bachelor's degree in Economics and Business Administration with honors. By age 21, Richards had earned a master's degree in Public Administration with emphases in Economics and Public Policy from the University of Southern California. Richards received his doctorate from the UCLA School of Law where he was honored as a Chancellor Marshall of his graduating Class. He was then admitted to practice law in California.

== Public service ==
After earning his degree, Richards went to work for the City of Carson, California where he administered a crime prevention program. He later organized the Career Development Institute, which assisted over 2000 youth prepare for professional careers. After completing law school, Richards took a position at the City of Compton, California as an executive level administrator and special legal counsel. Richards drafted the Developer Relations Guidelines that helped to resolve issues within the City and its Redevelopment Agency. In 1995, Richards left Compton.

In November 1986, Richards was elected to the Lynwood City Council to complete the term (through December 1989) of council member Louis Thompson who had died in office. With his election, Blacks now comprised the majority of the 5-member City Council (with three Black council members: Richards along with mayor Robert Henning and councilwoman and mayor pro tem Evelyn Wells; and two white council members: John Byork and E.L. Morris). On December 2, 1986, the council deadlocked 2-2 on appointing a new mayor, the result of the absence of councilmember John Byork who had pneumonia. The council also deadlocked in agreeing to extend the date for the vote so Byork could return. Henning who supported his council ally, Evelyn Wells, as mayor, resigned on the same day making Wells acting mayor, the first woman and second African-American to hold the office in Lynwood. On December 16, 1986, Byork returned and the full council voted 3-1 for Paul Richards as mayor (Henning abstained, Wells voting against, and Richards, Byork, and council member E.L. Morris voted for the nomination). Although she relinquished the gavel, Wells physically refused to give up the center seat stating that as mayor pro tem, she should serve as the next mayor and that the only reason she was not chosen was because she was a woman. Richards appointment made him the third African-American to serve as mayor in Lynwood after Robert Henning, the city's first African-American mayor, and Evelyn Wells, the first female African-American mayor. In January 1987, after the city faced a $5 million lawsuit over racial bias in its hiring practices, Richards and the council passed legislation that would hire five Black trainees to augment its then 36-member, all-white Fire Department. In December 1987, he was appointed as mayor for an additional term. In January 1989, the council appointed Evelyn Wells as mayor.

In August 1989, serving as chief negotiator with Los Angeles County, he was able to secure the construction of a $161 million, 560,000 square foot, Justice Center in Lynwood which included the largest Sheriff's station in the county, a 1,065 bed jail, and three municipal courts; and successfully negotiated an additional $3.5 million in direct payments to the city in excess of the $5.0 million originally proposed for hosting the center. In 1989, after the three Black members of the City Council faced charges of racial favoritism after renaming Century Boulevard to Martin Luther King Drive, Richards suggested a 27-member committee on race relations; the proposal was approved and Richards named as chairman. In 1992, he ran for senator in California's 25th senatorial district but was defeated in the Democratic primary by Teresa Patterson Hughes.

In December 1992, he was again appointed as mayor. Richards would continue to win 4-year terms on the City Council in the November elections held in 1993, 1997, and 2001; and would be appointed to the mayorship in 1993, 1994, 1995, 1996, 1997, and 2000. While mayor, Richards was credited with presiding over Lynwood's economic turnaround and reducing crime and blight; while also being criticized for nepotism and allegations of corruption.

In March 1996, he was defeated in the Democratic primary for the 37th U.S. congressional district. In the November 1997 election, he became the sole African-American on the Lynwood City Council after Robert Henning was defeated in his re-election bid. This marked the beginning of a shift in political power from the declining African-American population to the growing Latino population (then 83% Latino and 17% Black) who now controlled the four remaining seats on the City Council.

In October 2003, Richards was voted out as City Counselor in Lynwood in a recall election. Maria Teresa Santillan was elected as his successor to finish out the remainder of his term (through December 2005) on the City Council.

== Criminal conviction and sentencing ==
Richards became embroiled in a significant legal scandal that culminated in his conviction and sentencing on federal bribery and kickback charges. Richards' political career came to a dramatic halt when he was found guilty of orchestrating a scheme to defraud the city of Lynwood. Richards was convicted of funneling no-bid city contracts to a consulting company controlled by himself and his family. This scheme involved extortion, money laundering, and honest services fraud, which were all tied to the bribery and kickback offenses. The jury found Richards guilty of 20 counts of "honest services" mail fraud, five counts of mail fraud, extortion, eight counts of money laundering and making a false statement to government investigators.

In 2006, Richards was initially sentenced to federal prison for his crimes. In 2010, U.S. District Judge R. Gary Klausner re-sentenced Richards to 188 months (approximately 15 years) in federal prison. This re-sentencing was a result of appeals and legal reviews that confirmed the severity of his offenses and the appropriateness of the initial conviction. The court found that Richards had indeed engaged in a systematic scheme to deprive the city of Lynwood of honest services. The court determined that the losses ranged between $2.5 to $7 million. As part of his sentence, Richards was ordered to pay restitution of $787,280 to Lynwood.

Two other people, Paula Cameo Harris (Richards' sister) and Bevan Atlee Thomas, received six- and ten-year sentences, respectively.

Richards was released from prison in 2018.

== Honorary offices ==
- Member of the California State University Dominguez Hills, Foundation Board,
- Vice Chairman of the Alameda Corridor Transportation Authority and was
- Second Vice President of the National Black Caucus of Local Elected Officials.
- Past President of the League of California Cities ( L.A.) and President of The Independent Cities Association.
- Past Chair, National League of Cities

== Certificates ==
- Certificate in Management, Harvard University
- Certificate in Budget Analysis and Fiscal Problem Solving, University of Southern California
- Certificate of Public Program Management, Harvard University

== Awards ==
- NAACP Civil Rights Award and NAACP Role Model of the Year Award
- USC Outstanding Alumni Award and UCLA Outstanding Leadership Award
- United States Conference of Mayors Outstanding Achievement Award.

== See also ==
- African American mayors in California
