= Lynwood Unified School District =

School district in California, United States

Address
- 11321 Bullis Road Lynwood, California, 90262; United States

District information
- Type: Public
- Grades: K–12
- NCES District ID: 0623160

Students and staff
- Students: 11,967 (2020-2021)
- Teachers: 517 (2020-2021) (FTE)
- Staff: 743 (2020-2021) (FTE)
- Student–teacher ratio: 23.11 (2020-2021)

Other information
- Website: www.mylusd.org

Lynwood Unified School District is a school district headquartered in Lynwood, California, United States.

== Schools ==
=== Adult schools ===
- Lynwood Community Adult School (LCAS) - LCAS and the Pearson Vue Testing Center are located at 11277 Atlantic Avenue. Day classes are held at the location on Atlantic Avenue while evening classes are held on the campus of Marco Antonio Firebaugh H.S. located at 5246 Martin Luther King Jr. Blvd. Lynwood Community Adult School programs consist of Adult Secondary Education (HS Diploma and GED preparation), English as a Second Language (ESL), Adult Basic Education (ABE), Citizenship classes, and Career Training (CTE). CTE classes include Solid Works Engineering, Child Development, and Medical Careers -LVN, CNA, MA, EKG, Phlebotomy, Pharmacy Tech and many community classes held throughout the city from yoga and fitness to computers, and Spanish language.

=== High schools ===
- Marco Antonio Firebaugh High School
- Lynwood High School
- Vista High School

=== Middle schools ===
- Cesar E. Chavez Middle school
- Hosler Middle School

=== Elementary schools ===
- Helen Keller Elementary School
- Janie P. Abbott Elementary School
- Lincoln Elementary School
- Lindbergh Elementary School
- Lugo Elementary School
- Mark Twain Elementary School
- Roosevelt Elementary School
- Rosa Parks Elementary School
- Thurgood Marshall Elementary School
- Washington Elementary School
- Will Rogers Elementary School
- Woodrow Wilson Elementary School
