= Publishers Association of the West =

Publishers Association of the West (or PubWest) is a trade association established in 1977, initially called the Rocky Mountain Book Publishers Association. PubWest is a professional organization that is a forum for the discussion of publishing issues. Members include a wide range of small independent presses, university and collegiate presses, and publishing companies with global operations; most members are based in the western United States and Canada. PubWest members include printers, designers, binderies, and publishing freelancers.

PubWest provides many services and activities for members. It sponsors a National Publishing Conference and Book Industry Trade Show. It also has a number of awards programs to recognize outstanding achievements in book publishing. In February 2021, Mirriam Warren of No Nonsense Fly Fishing Guidebooks was elected president of the board of directors.
