= Lynwood station =

Los Angeles Metro Rail station

Lynwood
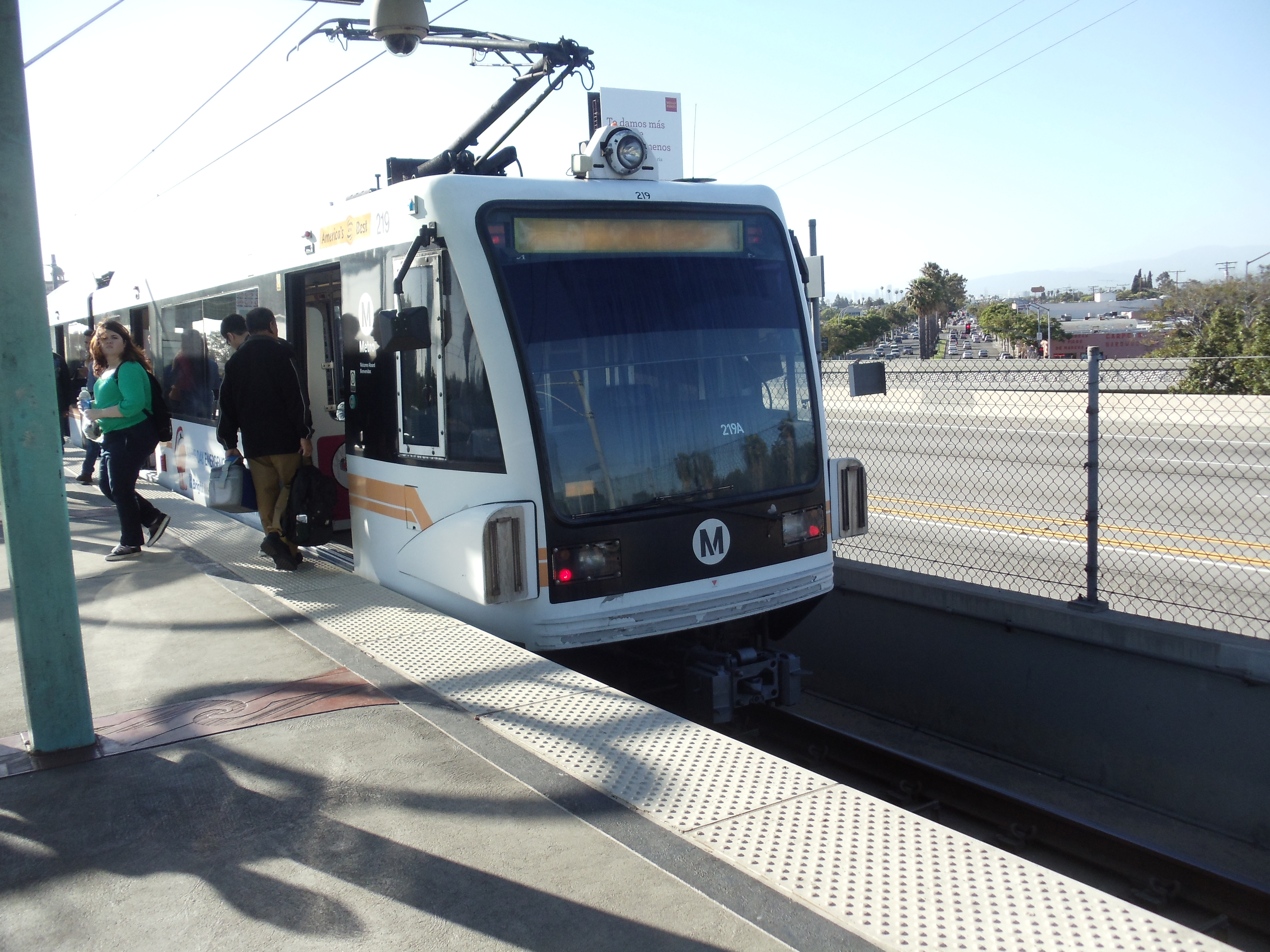
- Lynwood station platform

General information
- Location: 11508 Long Beach Boulevard; Lynwood, California
- Coordinates: 33.9249°N 118.2100°W
- Owner: Los Angeles Metro
- Platforms: 1 island platform
- Tracks: 2
- Connections: Los Angeles Metro Bus; Lynwood Breeze

Construction
- Structure type: Freeway median, elevated
- Parking: 635 spaces
- Accessible: Yes

History
- Opened: c. 1905
- Closed: May 24, 1958
- Rebuilt: 1917, August 12, 1995
- Former names: Long Beach Boulevard/I-105 (1995–2000); Long Beach Boulevard (2000–2025)

Passengers
- FY 2026: 1,359 (avg. wkdy boardings)

Services
Preceding station	Metro Rail	Following station
Willowbrook/Rosa Parks toward LAX	C Line	Lakewood Boulevard toward Norwalk
Former services
Preceding station	Pacific Electric	Following station
Modjeska Park toward Pacific Electric Building	Santa Ana	Lugo toward Santa Ana SP Depot
- Lynwood Pacific Electric Railway Depot
- U.S. National Register of Historic Places
- Location within the Los Angeles metropolitan area Location within California Location within the United States
- Coordinates: 33°55′32″N 118°12′34″W (Note: Original location of Pacific Electric Depot 33°55′32″N 118°12′34″W)
- Built: 1917
- Architectural style: Mission Revival
- NRHP reference No.: 74000524
- Added to NRHP: September 25, 1974
Location

Lynwood station is an elevated light rail station on the C Line of the Los Angeles Metro Rail system. It is located in the median of Interstate 105 above Long Beach Boulevard, in the city of Lynwood, California, after which the station is named.

The original name for the station was Long Beach Boulevard/I-105, but was later shortened to Long Beach Boulevard.

In January 2025, Metro board chair Janice Hahn, on behalf of the Gateway Cities Council of Governments, requested that the station be renamed Lynwood, to prevent confusion with the A Line station down in Long Beach. The name change was approved on January 23, 2025, and went into effect on June 6, 2025, coinciding with the opening of the LAX/Metro Transit Center.

== History ==
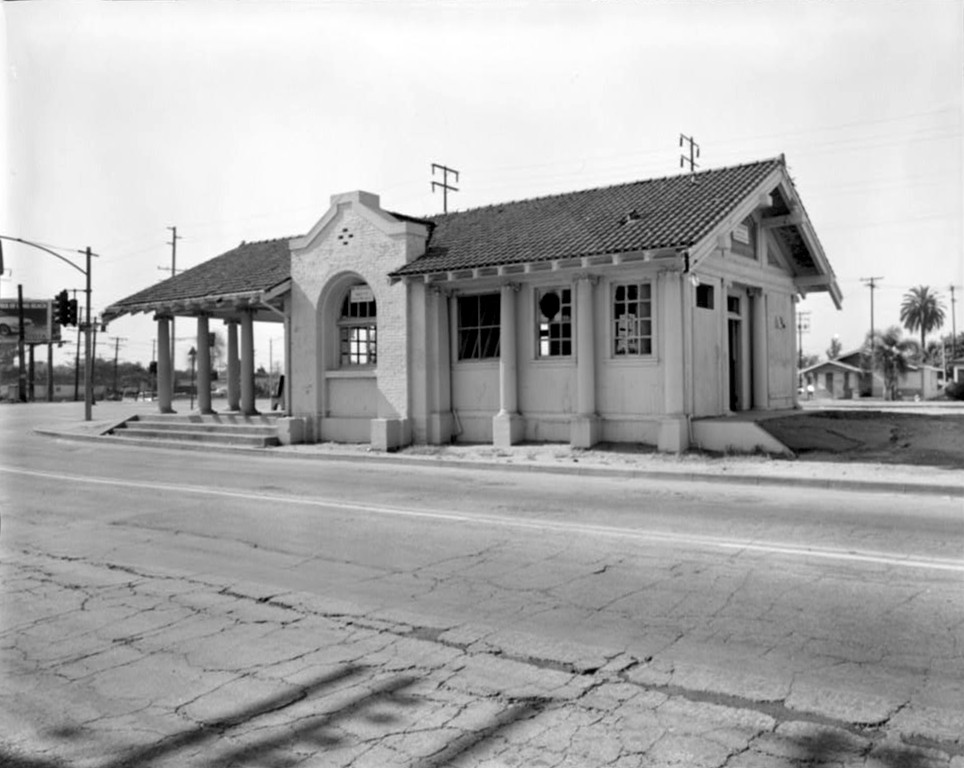
Lynwood Depot at its original location on Long Beach Boulevard, April 1980

The first Lynwood station was established by the Los Angeles Inter-Urban Electric Railway in 1905 as part of the West Santa Ana Branch. It was little more than a simple shed adjacent to sugar beet fields at the intersection of Long Beach Boulevard. The line and station was folded into the new Pacific Electric Railway in 1911. In 1917, the Lynwood Company constructed a new Depot designed in the Mission Revival style by architect, Bernard Maybeck for the railroad in exchange for other nearby grade and level crossing improvements. Interurban service was discontinued in 1958 with the rest of the Santa Ana Line.

The Depot building was added to the U.S. National Register of Historic Places on September 25, 1974. It was also catalogued by the Historic American Buildings Survey in 1908. The building was acquired by the City of Lynwood as a gift from Southern Pacific (successors to the PE). When the Century Freeway was constructed through Lynwood in the late 1980s, the Depot building was moved to its current location at 3780 Martin Luther King Jr. Boulevard near the entrance to Lynwood City Park. (Note: Modern location of Pacific Electric Depot 33.928295°N 118.200622°W) The modern Lynwood station serves the Los Angeles Metro Rail C Line light rail near Lynwood Depot's original location.

== Service ==
=== Hours and frequency ===
C Line service hours are approximately from 4:00 a.m. until 12:30 a.m. daily. Trains operate every 10 minutes throughout the day. Night and early morning weekend service is every 20 minutes.

=== Connections ===
As of June 6, 2025, the following connections are available:

- Los Angeles Metro Bus: 60, 251
- Lynwood Breeze: A
- Metro Micro: Watts/Compton Zone

== See also ==
- Watts Station — another former PE station building listed on the NRHP
- Paramount/Rosecrans station — another former PE and future Metro Rail station on the West Santa Ana Branch
- Bellflower station — another former PE and future Metro Rail station on the West Santa Ana Branch
- Pioneer station — another former PE and future Metro Rail station on the West Santa Ana Branch
