= Gibbs Smith =

American publisher based in Utah

- Founded: 1969
- Founders: Gibbs M. Smith and Catherine Smith
- Country of origin: United States
- Headquarters location: Layton, Utah
- Distribution: Simon & Schuster (US); Peribo (Australia); Raincoast Books (Canada); Publishers Group UK (UK); Grantham Book Services (Europe); Jonathan Ball (South Africa); Penguin Books (India)
- Publication types: Books
- Official website: gibbs-smith.com

Gibbs Smith is an American publisher based in Utah. The publishing house was founded in 1969 by Gibbs M. Smith (1940–2017) and his wife Catherine. Its offerings include children's books, including the BabyLit line, cookbooks, home reference books, and the LoveLit gift line. It distributes the Lil' Libros line of bilingual board books. The Gibbs Smith Education division produces social studies textbooks and digital materials for schools.

== History ==
The company began its existence in a one-room sculptor's studio in Santa Barbara, California. Smith used $12,000 earned from working on the film version of his master's dissertation on labor activist Joe Hill to finance his publishing venture, after receiving words of encouragement from publisher Alfred A. Knopf, Sr. By 1973, the company had moved to a barn built in 1916 in East Layton, Utah.

When operations first began in the barn, company personnel only had access to the top portion of the barn, while the bottom of the barn hosted cows and chickens. The company was originally known as Peregrine Smith, before folding that name into one of its imprints and catalog lines.

The company first entered educational publishing in 1973 with its textbook Utah's Heritage and its educational publishing efforts provided financial stability during its early years. By the late 1990s, 30 percent of its revenue came from publishing textbooks.

== Company growth and expansion ==
By the early 1980s, the company had grown to eight employees. As of the late 1990s, it was a considered a mid-sized publisher, received about 100 manuscript submissions each week, and brought about 60 new books to market each year. The book topics included cowboy humor, western boots, architectural history, and cookbooks. By the mid-2000s, the company offered such specialty cookbooks as 101 Things To Do with Meatballs and a cookbook on ramen noodles. The company was also involved in nature and wilderness books, and Smith served as president of the Utah chapter of the Sierra Club in the late 1980s.

By the mid-1990s, the company had expanded into children's books. The company also published on Utah-specific topics, like Utah folklore and LDS history.

As major commercial publishing houses increasingly declined to publish manuscripts in the 1970s and 1980s that did not appear to guarantee commercial success, authors sought out publishing houses like Gibbs Smith.

== Educational publishing ==
By the 2010s, the company's Gibbs Smith Education unit had developed state-specific social studies textbooks and digital materials based on Common Core standards and state-specific standards. The company claimed that as of 2013, more than 30 states used the company's social studies materials.

=== Controversy ===
In early 2014, a parent in central Washington state drew media attention after criticizing a Gibbs Smith Washington state history textbook's summary of the Second Amendment. School district staff maintained that any harm from the characterization of the Second Amendment—as based on a right to use guns for hunting and other legal purposes—was minimal, as the information on the federal Constitution was supplementary to the textbook's core focus on state history and civics and because the text was necessarily diluted because of its mixed audience of seventh through ninth grade students.
