= Lynwood High School =

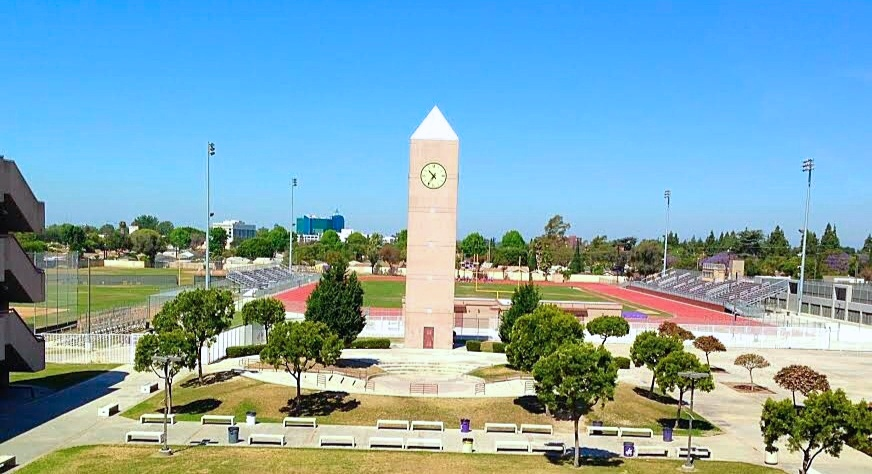

Location
- 12124 Bullis Rd; Lynwood, Los Angeles, California 90262; United States

Information
- Type: Public high school
- School district: Lynwood Unified School District
- Teaching staff: 82.68 (FTE)
- Grades: 9th - 12th
- Enrollment: 1,882 (2023–2024)
- Student to teacher ratio: 22.76
- Colors: Purple and gold
- Sports: Football, Cross Country, Tennis, Volleyball, Golf, Basketball, Soccer, Baseball, Softball, Track and Field, Lacrosse, Cheerleading
- Team name: Knights
- Rival: Firebaugh High School
- Website: lhs.lynwood.k12.ca.us

Lynwood High School is one of three high schools in Lynwood, California, United States. It is a part of the Lynwood Unified School District.

== Sports ==
The school has been recognized for their "Lady Knights" girls basketball team. Every year the Lady Knights win championships in Southern California and tournaments around the nation. They have won over 30 SGVL championships, 10 CIF SS championships, and three CIF State Championships. In 2002, the "Lady Knights" won the National CIF Championship with a record of 33-0 in girls basketball and finished ranked Number 1 in the country. Now the girls basketball team is ranked in the top 50 in the USA and in the top 20 in California.

== History ==
Early Origins and Establishment (1930–1950)

The early roots of public education on the site trace back to the Lugo/Wilson School, which was severely damaged and subsequently demolished after the 1933 Long Beach earthquake. Following the disaster, a collection of school facilities was constructed throughout the 1930s.

During World War II, the City of Lynwood underwent rapid industrial expansion, manufacturing aircraft, military electronics, and shipping materials. The resulting influx of workers caused the local population to more than double within a decade. To manage this exponential growth, the Lynwood Unified School District was officially established in 1950. With the formation of the unified district, a building structural swap took place: a 1930 complex originally configured as a junior high school was officially designated as Lynwood High School.

Overcrowding at the Bullis Road Campus (1950–1998)

For several decades, Lynwood High School operated out of its central campus located at 12124 Bullis Road. Originally designed to comfortably accommodate approximately 1,500 students, the school faced severe overcrowding by the 1980s. By 1983, the state approved $34 million to replace the aging facility, but local site selection disputes and funding delays stalled development for over a decade.

By the early 1990s, the student body swelled to over 3,300 students. To handle the volume, administrators added numerous portable classrooms, instituted a year-round multi-track schedule, and staggered lunch periods because the campus lacked an indoor cafeteria. Classrooms lacked central air conditioning, and the school did not have a functional public-address system, requiring staff to hand-deliver daily announcements.

Move to Imperial Highway (1998–2020)

Following a decade of litigation over land acquisition, construction began in 1994 on a completely new, modern campus situated on Imperial Highway—a parcel previously owned by the Lynwood Adventist Academy. Completed at a total cost of $98.4 million, the flagship Imperial Campus officially opened to students in 1998, with final touch-ups finished by 2000. The original Bullis Road facilities were subsequently converted into Lynwood Middle School.

Structural Failure and Modern Re-location (2020–Present)

In June 2020, during pandemic-related campus closures, a massive section of exterior ceiling panels collapsed on the main three-story classroom building at the Imperial Campus. A comprehensive structural inspection determined that the primary classroom building was unsafe and required full reconstruction.

To maintain uninterrupted instruction, the school district executed an emergency campus swap. In August 2021, high school students and staff were relocated back to the Bullis Road campus (the temporary home of Lynwood Middle School), which was heavily modified with added portable structures, a new tech hub, and enhanced athletic spaces to support the high school curriculum.

On July 8, 2022, the State of California allocated $250 million to fully fund the demolition and reconstruction of the Imperial Campus. A formal demolition ceremony of the compromised structure was held on November 6, 2023. The state-of-the-art rebuild is scheduled to be completed, with the Imperial Campus slated to officially reopen, in Fall 2027.

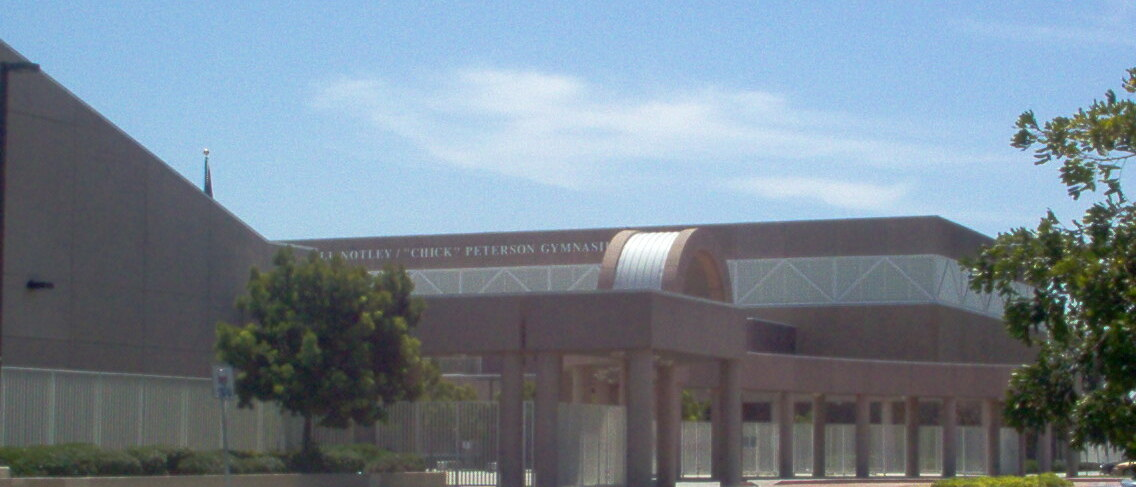
View from Imperial Highway

== Notable alumni ==
- Jack Babashoff – American swimmer (born 1955)
- Bud Bulling – American baseball player (1952–2014)
- Don Carrithers – American baseball player (born 1949)
- Juaquin Hawkins – American basketball player (born 1973)
- Davon Jefferson – American basketball player (born 1986)
- Suge Knight – American record executive and convicted felon (born 1965)
- Rayah Marshall – American basketball player (born 2003)
- Efrén Navarro – American baseball player (born 1986)
- Patty Rodriguez – American entrepreneur, producer, radio personality and author
- Erroll Tucker – American gridiron football player (born 1964)
- "Weird Al" Yankovic – American comedy musician (born 1959)
