= List of first African-American mayors =

The first African-American mayors were elected during Reconstruction in the Southern United States beginning about 1867. African Americans in the South were also elected to many local offices, such as sheriff and Justice of the Peace, and state offices such as legislatures as well as a smaller number of federal offices. After this period ended in 1876, it became increasingly difficult for African Americans to compete in elections due to racial discrimination, such as Jim Crow laws.

After the end of the 19th century, it generally was not until the 1960s, following the civil rights movement and passage of the Civil Rights Act of 1964 and Voting Rights Act of 1965, that they again began to be elected or appointed to mayoral positions. Achievements in African Americans' being elected mayor in majority-European American and other municipalities made their political participation one of daily life in many localities.

In 1970, there were fewer than 50 African American mayors; by 1982, there were 205. Lelia Foley was the first African American woman elected mayor in the United States. In 1986, the first African-American women mayors were elected to major mid-size cities.

== 1860s ==
=== 1867 ===
- First African-American appointed mayor of a U.S. town as mayor of St. Martinville, Louisiana: Monroe Baker

=== 1868 ===
- First African American elected mayor of a U.S. town as mayor of Donaldsonville, Louisiana: Pierre Caliste Landry
- First African-American mayor of Kingstree, South Carolina: Stephen Atkins Swails

=== 1869 ===
- First African-American mayor of Maryville, Tennessee: William Bennett Scott Sr.

== 1870s ==
=== 1870 ===
- First African American elected mayor of a Mississippi city: Robert H. Wood, mayor of Natchez

=== 1871 ===
- First African-American mayor of Baton Rouge, Louisiana: Loyeau Berhel

=== 1875 ===
- First African American mayor of Newnansville, Florida: Matthew M. Lewey

=== 1876 ===
- First African American Acting mayor of Tallahassee: Samuel C. Watkins

=== 1878 ===
- First African American to be elected to serve as mayor in the state of New York: Edward "Ned" Sherman, mayor of Cleveland, New York

== 1880s ==
=== 1886 ===
- First African American mayor of Brooklyn, Illinois: John Evans

=== 1887 ===
- Founding mayor: Columbus H. Boger, Eatonville, Florida

=== 1888 ===
- First African American to be elected to the office of mayor in California and probably the first elected mayor in the Western United States: Edward P. Duplex, Wheatland, California

=== 1899 ===
- Founding mayor of Hobson City, Alabama; Samuel L. Davis

== 1900s ==
=== 1905 ===
- Founding mayor of Boley, Oklahoma: T. B. Armstrong

== 1910s ==
=== 1918 ===
- Founding mayor of Robbins, Illinois: Thomas J. Kellar

== 1920s ==
=== 1926 ===
- Lawnside, New Jersey became a self-governing community in 1926 and has elected African-American mayors since its inception.

== 1940s ==
=== 1946 ===
- First African American mayor of Lincoln Heights, Ohio: Michael J. Mangham

=== 1949 ===
- First African American mayor of East Chicago Heights, Illinois (now known as Ford Heights): Charlie Williams

== 1960s ==
=== 1963 ===
- First African-American mayor in the state of Hawaii as the Chairman and Executive Officer of the County of Hawaii (a forerunner of the Mayor of Hawaiʻi County): Helene Hale

=== 1964 ===
- First African-American mayor of Richmond, California: George D. Carroll

=== 1966 ===
- First African-American mayor of Flint, Michigan: Floyd J. McCree
- First African-American mayor of Lake Elsinore, California: Thomas R. Yarborough
- First African-American mayor of Milpitas, California: Ben F. Gross
- First African-American mayor of El Centro, California: DuBois McGee
- First African-American mayor of Springfield, Ohio: Robert C. Henry

=== 1967 ===
- First elected African-American mayor of Gary, Indiana: Richard G. Hatcher
- First African-American mayor of a large U.S. city, Cleveland, Ohio: Carl Stokes
- First African-American appointed mayor of Washington, D.C.: Walter Washington (see also: 1975)
- First African American mayor of Ypsilanti, Michigan: John Burton
- First African American mayor of Saginaw, Michigan: Henry G. Marsh

=== 1968 ===
- First African American to be elected mayor of Montclair, New Jersey: Matthew G. Carter
- First African-American mayor of a Kentucky city: Luska Twyman, Glasgow, Kentucky
- First African American to be elected mayor of a predominantly white Southern city: Howard Nathaniel Lee, Chapel Hill, North Carolina
- First African American to be elected mayor in Michigan: Robert B. Blackwell, Highland Park, Michigan

=== 1969 ===
- In 1969, Sophia Mitchell was appointed mayor of Rendville, becoming the first African American woman to serve as mayor in Ohio. She continued to lead for at least two additional terms.
- First African American to be elected mayor of Fayette, Mississippi: Charles Evers
- First African-American mayor of Compton, California: Douglas Dollarhide
- First African American to be elected mayor of East Orange, New Jersey: William Stanford Hart Sr.
- First African American to be elected mayor of Chapel Hill, North Carolina: Howard Nathaniel Lee

== 1970s ==
=== 1970 ===
- First African American to be elected mayor of Newark, New Jersey: Kenneth A. Gibson
- First African American to be elected mayor of Dayton, Ohio: James H. McGee
- First African-American appointed mayor of Wichita, Kansas: A. Price Woodard
- First African American to be elected mayor of Salina, Kansas: Robert C. Caldwell
- First African American to be elected mayor of Chesilhurst, New Jersey: George J. Phillips
- First African American to be appointed mayor of Carson, California: Gilbert D. Smith

=== 1971 ===
- First African American to be appointed mayor of Gainesville, Florida since the Reconstruction era: Neil A. Butler
- First African American to be appointed mayor of Grand Rapids, Michigan: Lyman Parks (see also: 1973)
- First African-American mayor of Englewood, New Jersey: Walter Scott Taylor
- First African American to be elected mayor of Berkeley, California: Warren Widener

=== 1972 ===
- First African-American mayor of Tallahassee, Florida and first African-American mayor of a state capital: James R. Ford
- First African-American mayor of Cincinnati, Ohio: Ted Berry
- First African-American mayor of Uniontown, Alabama: Andrew Hayden
- First African-American mayor of Prichard, Alabama: Algernon J. Cooper
- First African American to be appointed mayor of Leavenworth, Kansas: Benjamin Day
- First African-American elected female mayor of (Urbancrest, Ohio) Ellen Walker Craig-Jones, in the United States (January 1, 1972) The Columbus, Ohio Board of Election, validates the dates of election
- First African-American mayor of Lakeland, Florida: John S. Jackson
- First African American mayor of Manhattan, Kansas: Murt Hanks Jr.

=== 1973 ===
- First African American to be elected mayor of Detroit, Michigan: Coleman Young
- First African American to be elected mayor of Raleigh, North Carolina: Clarence Lightner
- First African American to be elected mayor of a city in Georgia, Greenville: Richmond D. Hill
- First African American to be elected mayor of a major Southern city: Maynard Jackson, Atlanta, Georgia
- First African American to be elected mayor of a major Western city: Tom Bradley, Los Angeles, California
- First African-American female mayor: Lelia Foley, Taft, Oklahoma
- First African-American female mayor of a major satellite city and first African American woman mayor in California: Doris A. Davis, Compton, California
- First African American to be elected mayor of Grand Rapids, Michigan: Lyman Parks (see also: 1971)

=== 1974 ===
- First African American to be elected mayor of Waco, Texas: Oscar Du Conge
- First African American to be appointed mayor of Pontiac, Michigan: Wallace E. Holland
- First African American to be elected mayor of Boulder, Colorado: Penfield Tate
- First African-American woman to be elected mayor of Fairplay, Colorado: Ada B. Evans
- First African American to be elected mayor of Berkeley Township, New Jersey: Edward Tolbert
- First African American to be elected mayor of Matawan, New Jersey and first African-American mayor in Monmouth County: Philip N. Gumbs
- First African American to be elected mayor of Paulsboro, New Jersey: Elwood Hampton
- First African American to be elected mayor of Randolph, New Jersey: Tyrone Barnes
- First African-American mayor of Bridgewater, New York and first African-American mayor in New York State: Everett Holmes
- First African-American mayor of Charlottesville, Virginia: Charles H. Barbour

=== 1975 ===
- First African American to be elected mayor, and first elected mayor, of Washington, D.C.: Walter Washington (see also: 1967)
- First African-American mayor of Santa Monica, California: Nat Trives
- First African-American mayor of Opa-Locka, Florida and first African-American mayor in Dade County: Albert Tresvant
- First African-American mayor of Ann Arbor, Michigan: Albert Wheeler

=== 1976 ===
- First African American to be elected mayor of Pocatello, Idaho and first African American to be elected mayor in the state of Idaho: Thomas L. Purce
- First African-American mayor of Seaside, California: Oscar Lawson
- First African-American mayor of Opelousas, Louisiana: John W. Joseph
- First African-American mayor in New Mexico and first African-American mayor of Las Cruces, New Mexico: Albert Johnson
- First African-American woman to be elected mayor in the U.S. state of Mississippi, as Mayor of Mayersville: Unita Blackwell

=== 1977 ===
- First African-American mayor of Richmond, Virginia: Henry L. Marsh (Note: elected from within nine City Council members; changed to general election in 2003)
- First African American to be elected mayor of Oakland, California: Lionel Wilson

=== 1978 ===
- First African American to be elected mayor of New Orleans: Ernest Nathan Morial
- First African-American woman to be elected mayor in Walthourville, Georgia: Carrie Kent

=== 1979 ===
- First African American to be elected mayor of Birmingham, Alabama: Richard Arrington, Jr.
- First African American to be appointed mayor of New London, Connecticut: Leo E. Jackson
- First African American to be elected mayor of Rock Island, Illinois: James R. Davis
- First African American mayor of Battle Creek, Michigan: Donald Sherrod

== 1980s ==
=== 1980 ===
- First African-American mayor of Menlo Park, California: Billy Ray White

=== 1981 ===
- First African American to be elected mayor of Camden, New Jersey: Randy Primas
- First African American to be elected mayor of Spokane, Washington: James Everett Chase
- First African American to be elected mayor of Plainfield, New Jersey, and first African American elected mayor in Central New Jersey: Everett C. Lattimore
- First African-American mayor of Little Rock, Arkansas: Charles E. Bussey Jr.
- First African-American mayor of Winter Haven, Florida: Lemuel Geathers
- First African-American mayor of Hartford, Connecticut: Thirman L. Milner
- First African-American mayor of Maywood, Illinois: Joe Freelon
- First African-American appointed mayor of Augusta, Georgia: Ed McIntyre

=== 1982 ===
- First African American to succeed to the office of mayor of Memphis, Tennessee after the resignation of his predecessor: J.O. Patterson, Jr.
- First African-American mayor of Teaneck, New Jersey: Bernard E. Brooks
- First female African-American mayor in the state of Florida and first female mayor of Opa-locka, Florida: Helen L. Miller
- First African-American mayor of Pasadena, California: Loretta Thompson-Glickman
- First African-American mayor of West Palm Beach, Florida: Eva Mack

=== 1983 ===
- First African American to be elected Mayor of Chicago: Harold Washington
- First African American to be elected mayor of Charlotte, North Carolina: Harvey Gantt
- First African American to be elected Mayor of Flint: James Sharp
- First African American to be elected mayor Hope, Arkansas: Floyd Young, Jr
- First African American to be elected Mayor of Philadelphia, Pennsylvania: Wilson Goode

=== 1984 ===
- First African American to be elected Mayor of Atlantic City, New Jersey: James L. Usry
- First African American to be elected mayor of Portsmouth, Virginia: James W. Holley III
- First African American to be appointed mayor of Peekskill, New York: Richard E. Jackson
- First African American and first woman mayor of Hurtsboro, Alabama; also first African-American woman mayor in the state of Alabama: Mary Kate Stovall
- First African American woman mayor of Battle Creek, Michigan: Maude Bristol Perry

=== 1985 ===
- First African American to be elected mayor of Plant City, Florida: Sadye Gibbs Martin 1985-1989 which also made her the first female African-American elected mayor of a major city in Florida. She served on the City Commission for 15 years
- First African American to be appointed mayor of Gainesville, Georgia: John W. Morrow Jr.
- First African-American to be appointed mayor of Lynwood, California: Robert Henning
- First African-American mayor of Markham, Illinois: Evans R Miller
- First African American to be elected mayor of Mount Vernon, New York, and first African American elected mayor in New York: Ronald Blackwood
- First African American to be appointed mayor of Mount Pleasant, Tennessee and first African-American appointed mayor in the state of Tennessee: Willie B. Baker
- First African American mayor of Bluff City, Tennessee: Billy Wells

=== 1986 ===
- First African-American and first female mayor of Newport News, Virginia: Jessie M. Rattley
- First African American to be appointed Lynwood, California: Evelyn Wells
- First African American and first woman mayor of Chester, Pennsylvania: Willie Mae Leake
- First African-American mayor of Mitchell, South Dakota: Leonard Williams

=== 1987 ===
- First African-American woman to be elected mayor of a major city Hartford, Connecticut: Carrie Saxon Perry
- First African American to succeed to the office of mayor of Baltimore, Maryland: Clarence H. Burns
- First African American to be elected mayor of Fairbanks, Alaska: James C. Hayes
- First African American to be elected mayor of Tacoma, Washington: Harold Moss
- First African-American female and first female mayor of Little Rock, Arkansas: Lottie Shackelford
- First African American to be appointed mayor of Dixmoor, Illinois: Zeb Lollis Jr.

=== 1988 ===
- First African American to be elected mayor of Baltimore, Maryland: Kurt Schmoke
- First African American to be elected mayor of Hempstead, New York: James A. Garner
- First African American to be elected mayor of Orange, New Jersey: Robert L. Brown
- First African American acting mayor of Omaha, Nebraska: Fred L. Conley
- First African American to be elected mayor of Vicksburg, Mississippi: Robert Walker
- First African American to be elected village mayor in New York State history: Thomas L. Watson Sr. (Haverstraw, 1988)

=== 1989 ===
- First African American to be elected mayor of New York City: David Dinkins
- First African American to be elected mayor of New Haven, Connecticut: John C. Daniels
- First African American to be elected mayor of Richmond, California: George Livingston
- First African American to be elected mayor of Rockford, Illinois: Charles Box
- First African American to be elected mayor of Seattle, Washington: Norm Rice
- First African American to succeed to the office of mayor of Minden, Louisiana, after the recall of his predecessor: Robert T. Tobin
- First African American to be elected mayor of Asbury Park, New Jersey: Thomas S. Smith
- First African-American mayor of Victorville, California: James Busby

== 1990s ==
=== 1990 ===
- First African American to be elected Mayor of Trenton, New Jersey: Douglas Palmer
- First African American to be elected mayor of New Bern, North Carolina: Leander R. "Lee" Morgan
- First African-American mayor of Lynchburg, Virginia: M.W. Thornhill Jr.
- First African American to be elected mayor of Chandler, Arizona: Coy Payne
- First African American to be elected mayor of New York City: David Dinkins
- First African American to be elected mayor of Irvington, New Jersey: Michael G. Steele

=== 1991 ===
- First African American to be elected mayor of Memphis, Tennessee: W. W. Herenton
- First African American to be elected mayor of Denver, Colorado: Wellington Webb
- First African American to be elected mayor of Kansas City, Missouri: Emanuel Cleaver
- First African-American to be appointed mayor of Lancaster, California: Henry Hearns
- First African-American woman to be elected mayor of Washington, D.C.: Sharon Pratt Kelly
- First African-American mayor of Trenton, New Jersey: Douglas Palmer
- First African-American mayor of Salem, New Jersey: Leon F. Johnson
- First African-American mayor elected in the state of Wisconsin as the mayor of Fitchburg: Frances Huntley-Cooper
- First African American mayor of Morgantown, West Virginia, and the first African-American woman to be elected mayor of a West Virginia city: Charlene Marshall
- First African-American woman mayor of Kalamazoo, Michigan: Beverly Moore

=== 1992 ===
- First African-American male to be elected mayor of Cambridge, Massachusetts: Kenneth Reeves
- First African-American mayor in the state of Alaska, as mayor of Fairbanks: James C. Hayes

=== 1993 ===
- First African American to be elected mayor of St. Louis, Missouri: Freeman Bosley Jr.
- First African American to be elected mayor of Rochester, New York: William A. Johnson Jr.
- First African American and first woman to be elected mayor of Minneapolis, Minnesota: Sharon Sayles Belton
- First African-American woman and first woman to be elected mayor of Irvington, New Jersey: Sara Bost
- First African American mayor of Evanston, Illinois: Lorraine H. Morton
- First African American and first woman mayor of East Point, Georgia: Patsy Jo Hilliard

=== 1994 ===
- Clifford DeBaptiste became the first African American mayor of West Chester, Pennsylvania.

=== 1995 ===
- First African American to be elected mayor of Dallas, Texas: Ron Kirk
- First African American to be elected mayor of Savannah, Georgia: Floyd Adams, Jr.
- First African-American woman to hold the position of mayor in any Iowa municipality when she served as mayor of Clinton, Iowa: LaMetta Wynn

=== 1996 ===
- First African American to be elected mayor of San Francisco, California: Willie Brown
- First African American to be elected mayor of Monroe, Louisiana: Abe E. Pierce, III
- First African American to be elected mayor of Pleasant Valley, Missouri: Abram "Abe" McGull

=== 1997 ===
- First African American to be elected mayor of Dolton, Illinois: William Shaw
- First African American to be elected mayor of Jackson, Mississippi: Harvey Johnson, Jr.
- First African American to be elected mayor of Houston, Texas: Lee P. Brown
- First African American to be elected mayor of Des Moines, Iowa: Preston Daniels
- First African American to be elected mayor of Paterson, New Jersey: Martin G. Barnes
- First African American to succeed to the office of mayor of Colorado Springs, Colorado, after the resignation of his predecessor: Leon Young
- First African-born black mayor in the United States, elected as mayor of East Cleveland, Ohio: Emmanuel Onunwor
- First African-American mayor of District Heights, Maryland: Jack Sims Jr.

=== 1998 ===
- First African-American mayor of Jasper, Texas: R. C. Horn
- First African American, openly lesbian mayor in the United States, and first African-American female mayor in Massachusetts (Cambridge, Massachusetts): E. Denise Simmons
- First African-American mayor of Hopewell, Virginia: Curtis West Harris
- First African-American and first female mayor of Lecompte, Louisiana: Rosa Mae Scott Jones
- First African-American woman mayor on the Eastern Shore of Maryland (served as interim only, not elected): Fannie Birckhead

=== 1999 ===
- First African-American mayor of Pineville, Louisiana: Clarence R. Fields (became interim mayor in 1999; was elected to a partial term in 2000 and re-elected to full terms in 2002, 2006, 2010, and 2014)
- First African-American mayor of Elyria, Ohio: Thomas O. Shores
- First African-American mayor of Forest Park, Ohio: Stephanie Summerow Dumas
- First African-American mayor of Macon, Georgia: C. Jack Ellis

== 2000s ==
=== 2000 ===
- First African American to be elected mayor of Columbus, Ohio: Michael B. Coleman
- First African American to be elected mayor of Selma, Alabama: James Perkins, Jr.
- First African American to be elected mayor of Oceanside, California: Terry Johnson
- First African American to be elected mayor in the state of Wyoming as mayor of Worland, Wyoming: LaVertha Gotier

=== 2001 ===
- First African American to be elected mayor of Hattiesburg, Mississippi: Johnny DuPree
- First African-American female mayor of a major Southern city, and first woman to be elected mayor of Atlanta, Georgia: Shirley Franklin
- First African American and first woman to be elected mayor of Southfield, Michigan: Brenda L. Lawrence
- First African American elected mayor of Fayetteville, North Carolina: Marshall Pitts Jr.
- First African-American female Republican to be elected mayor of Tchula, Mississippi: Yvonne Brown
- First African-American Mayor of Jersey City, New Jersey: Glenn Cunningham
- First African-American female to be appointed mayor of Gainesville, Georgia: Myrtle Figueras
- First African-American mayor of Pittsburg, California: Yvonne Beals
- First African-American woman mayor of Richmond, California: Irma Anderson
- First African-American mayor of Riverdale, Illinois: Zenovia Evans (appointed 2001, elected to a full term thereafter)

=== 2002 ===
- First woman, first African-American woman, and third African American to be elected mayor of Dayton, Ohio: Rhine McLin
- First African American to be elected mayor of Toledo, Ohio: Jack Ford

=== 2003 ===
- First African American to be elected mayor of Palm Springs, California: Ron Oden
- First African American to be elected by citizens as mayor of Tallahassee, Florida: John Marks
- First African American to be elected mayor, and first elected mayor, of San Ramon, California: H. Abram Wilson
- First African-American mayor of Alexandria, Virginia: William D. Euille

=== 2004 ===
- First African American to be elected mayor of Midway, Alabama: James N. Robbins, Sr.
- First African American to be elected mayor of Baton Rouge, Louisiana: Kip Holden
- First African-American mayor of Milwaukee, Wisconsin: Marvin Pratt
- First African American to be elected mayor of Pine Bluff, Arkansas: Carl A. Redus Jr.
- First African-American female to be elected mayor of Waco, Texas: Mae Jackson
- First African-American female to be appointed mayor of East Cleveland, Ohio: Saratha Goggins
- First African American and first woman to serve as mayor of Greenville, Mississippi: Heather McTeer Toney

=== 2005 ===
- First African American to be elected mayor of Buffalo, New York: Byron Brown
- First African American to be elected mayor of Mobile, Alabama: Sam Jones
- First African American to be elected mayor of Asheville, North Carolina: Terry Bellamy
- First African American to be elected mayor of Cincinnati, Ohio: Mark Mallory
- First African American to be elected mayor of Youngstown, Ohio: Jay Williams
- First African American and first woman to be elected mayor of Greenwood, Mississippi: Sheriel F. Perkins
- First African American to succeed to the office of mayor of Orlando, Florida: Ernest Page

=== 2006 ===
- First African American to be elected mayor of Shreveport, Louisiana: Cedric Glover
- First African American to be elected mayor of Anderson, South Carolina: Terence Roberts
- First African-American mayor of Duarte, California: Lois Gaston
- First African American to be elected mayor of Killeen, Texas: Timothy Hancock
- First African American to be elected mayor of Lancaster, California: Henry Hearns

=== 2007 ===
- First African-American woman and first woman to be elected mayor of Baltimore, Maryland: Sheila Dixon
- First African American to be elected mayor of Greensboro, North Carolina: Yvonne Johnson
- First African American to be elected mayor of Wichita, Kansas: Carl Brewer
- First African American to be elected mayor of South Harrison Township, New Jersey: Charles Tyson

=== 2008 ===
- First African American to be elected mayor of Blue Springs, Missouri: Carson Ross
- First African American to be elected mayor of Lancaster, Texas: Marcus Knight
- First African American to be elected mayor of Mansfield, Ohio: Donald Culliver
- First African American to be elected mayor of Sacramento, California: Kevin Johnson
- First African-American mayor of Festus, Missouri: Earl Cook
- First African American and first woman to be elected mayor of Cambridge, Maryland: Victoria Jackson-Stanley

=== 2009 ===
- First African American to be elected mayor of Philadelphia, Mississippi: James Young
- First African American to be elected mayor of Freeport, New York: Andrew Hardwick
- First African-American woman to be elected mayor of Brentwood, Maryland: Xzavier Montgomery-Wright
- First African American and first woman to be elected mayor of Harrisburg, Pennsylvania: Linda D. Thompson
- First African-American woman to serve as mayor of Birmingham, Alabama: Carole Smitherman
- First woman mayor of Saratoga Springs, Utah; also first African-American woman mayor in the state of Utah: Mia Love

== 2010s ==
=== 2010 ===
- First African-American woman to be elected mayor of Fontana, California: Acquanetta Warren
- First African American to be elected mayor of Columbia, South Carolina: Stephen K. Benjamin
- First African American to be elected mayor of Bridgeton, New Jersey: Albert B. Kelly
- First African American to be elected Mayor of Lakeland, Florida: Gow Fields
- First African American elected mayor of York, Pennsylvania: C. Kim Bracey
- First appointed African American mayor of Roxboro, North Carolina: Samuel Spencer
- First appointed African American mayor of East Chicago, Indiana: Anthony Copeland
- First African American elected mayor of Tarpon Springs, Florida, and the first African American elected mayor of a municipality in Pinellas County, Florida: David O. Archie.

=== 2011 ===
- First African American to be elected mayor of Jacksonville, Florida: Alvin Brown
- First African-American mayor of Knoxville, Tennessee: Daniel Brown
- First African-American woman to be elected mayor of Savannah, Georgia: Edna Jackson
- First African-American woman and first woman mayor of Bluff City, Tennessee: Irene Wells

=== 2012 ===
- First African-American mayor of Ithaca, New York: Svante Myrick
- First African-American mayor of Antioch, California: Wade Harper
- First African-American and first female mayor of Orrville, Alabama: Louvenia Diane Lumpkin
- First African-American mayor of Phenix City, Alabama: Eddie Lowe
- First African-American woman and first woman to be elected mayor of Gary, Indiana: Karen Freeman-Wilson
- First African American mayor of High Point, North Carolina: Bernita Sims
- First African American woman elected mayor of Albany, Georgia: Dorothy Hubbard

=== 2013 ===
- First African-American mayor of Plano, Texas: Harry LaRosiliere
- First African-American mayor of Meridian, Mississippi: Percy Bland
- First African-American mayor of Hawthorne, California: Chris Brown
- First African-American woman mayor of Broward County, Florida: Barbara Sharief

=== 2014 ===
- First African-American mayor of Quitman, Georgia: James C. Brown III
- First African-American mayor of Adairsville, Georgia: Kenneth J. Carson
- First African-American female mayor of New Haven, Connecticut, and first woman: Toni Harp
- First African-American mayor of Brunswick, Georgia: Cornell Harvey
- First African-American female mayor of San Antonio, Texas: Ivy Taylor
- First African-American woman to be elected mayor of Shreveport, Louisiana: Ollie Tyler
- First African-American female Mayor of Teaneck, New Jersey, as well as the first African-American female mayor of any municipality in Bergen County, New Jersey: Lizette Parker
- First female mayor, first African-American female mayor, and second African-American mayor overall of Rochester, New York: Lovely Warren
- First African-American mayor of Linden, New Jersey: Derek Armstead
- First African-American mayor of Purcellville, Virginia: Kwasi Fraser

=== 2015 ===
- First African American and first African-American woman to be elected mayor of Pearsall, Texas: Mary Moore
- First African American and first African-American woman to be elected mayor of Conway, South Carolina: Barbara Blain-Bellamy
- First African American to be elected mayor of Camilla, Georgia: Rufus L Davis II
- First African American to be elected mayor of Fayetteville, Georgia: Edward J Johnson Jr
- First African-American woman to be elected mayor of Toledo, Ohio: Paula Hicks-Hudson
- First African-American woman and first woman to be elected mayor of Flint, Michigan: Karen Weaver
- First African American and first African-American woman to be appointed as mayor of Grove Hill, Alabama: Cynthia McGill Jackson
- First woman and fifth African-American mayor of Flint, Michigan: Karen Weaver

=== 2016 ===
- First African American to be elected mayor in San Diego County and Lemon Grove, California: Racquel Vasquez
- First African-American and first African-American female mayor of Midland City, Alabama: Jo Ann Bennett Grimsley
- First African American to be elected mayor of Norfolk, Virginia: Kenneth Alexander
- First African American to be elected mayor of Stockton, California: Michael Tubbs
- First African American and first African-American woman to be elected as mayor of Grove Hill, Alabama: Cynthia McGill Jackson
- First African American to be elected as mayor of Flagstaff, Arizona: Coral Evans
- First African-American mayor of Abilene, Texas: Anthony Williams
- First African-American mayor of Santa Cruz, California: Martine Watkins, also first biracial mayor
- First African-American woman to serve as mayor-president of Baton Rouge, Louisiana: Sharon Weston Broome

=== 2017 ===
- First African American elected mayor of Stamps, Arkansas: Brenda Davis
- First African-American woman to be elected mayor of Charlotte, North Carolina: Vi Lyles
- First African American to be elected mayor of St. Paul, Minnesota: Melvin Carter
- First African American to be elected mayor of Waukegan, Illinois: Sam Cunningham
- First African American to be elected mayor of Aurora, Illinois: Richard Irvin
- First African American female to be elected mayor of Broadview, Illinois: Katrina Thompson
- First African-American woman to succeed to the office of mayor of Paterson, New Jersey: Ruby Cotton
- First African-American and first female mayor of Mound City, Illinois: Allison Madison
- First African-American woman to be appointed as mayor of Paterson, New Jersey: Jane Williams-Warren
- First African-American woman to be elected as mayor of Kankakee, Illinois: Chastity Wells-Armstrong
- First African-American mayor of Gardena, California: Tasha Cerda, also the first native American mayor in the state of California
- First African-American mayor of Pelahatchie, Mississippi and first African-American mayor in Rankin County, Mississippi: Ryshonda Harper Beechem

=== 2018 ===
- First African American to be elected mayor of Little Rock, Arkansas: Frank Scott Jr.
- First African-American mayor of Brookneal, Virginia: James Nowlin
- First African-American mayor of Orange County, Florida: Jerry Demings
- First African-American mayor of Helena, Montana: Wilmot Collins
- First African American to be appointed mayor of Danville, Illinois: Rickey Williams Jr.
- First African-American mayor of Bridgeport, Pennsylvania: Mark Barbee
- First African-American mayor of Lathrup Village, Michigan: Mykale (Kelly) Garrett
- First African-American mayor of Hercules, California: Dion Bailey
- First African-American woman mayor of Charlottesville, Virginia: Nikuyah Walker
- First African-American woman mayor of New Orleans: LaToya Cantrell
- First African-American woman mayor of San Francisco: London Breed
- First African-American woman to be a popularly elected mayor in Massachusetts when inaugurated as mayor of Framingham, Massachusetts: Yvonne M. Spicer

=== 2019 ===
- First African American to be elected Mayor of Manor, Texas: Larry Wallace Jr.
- First African-American woman and first openly gay person to be elected Mayor of Chicago: Lori Lightfoot
- First African-American mayor of Lewisburg, West Virginia: Beverly White
- First African American to be elected mayor of Elyria, Ohio: Frank Whitfield
- First African American to be elected Mayor of Montgomery, Alabama: Steven Reed
- First African American to be elected mayor of Talladega, Alabama: Timothy Ragland
- First African American to be elected mayor of Irmo, South Carolina: Barry Walker
- First African American to be elected mayor of Eastpointe, Michigan: Monique Owens
- First African American to be elected mayor of New Castle, Pennsylvania: Chris Frye
- First African American to be elected mayor of Wyoming, Ohio: Thaddeus Hoffmeister
- First African-American mayor of, and first mayor elected by popular vote in, Camden, Arkansas: Julian Lott (also president of Arkansas Black Mayors Association 2020–present)
- First African American to be elected mayor of Danville, Illinois: Rickey Williams Jr.
- First African American to be elected mayor of Fort Smith, Arkansas: George McGill
- First African American appointed mayor of Centralia, Illinois: Herb Williams
- First African-American mayor of Forest Park, Illinois: Rory Hoskins

== 2020s ==
=== 2020 ===
- First woman and first African American to be elected mayor of Ferguson, Missouri: Ella Jones
- First African American to be elected mayor of Lake View, Alabama: Adrain Dudley
- First African American to be elected mayor of Natchitoches, Louisiana: Ronnie Williams, Jr.
- First African American to be elected mayor of Tempe, Arizona: Corey Woods
- First African American to be elected mayor of Williamsport, Pennsylvania: Derek Slaughter
- First African American to be elected mayor of Los Altos, California: Neysa Fligor
- First elected African-American female mayor of Carson, California: Lula Davis-Holmes
- First African American to be elected mayor of Denton, Texas: Gerard Hudspeth
- First African American to be elected Mayor of Muskogee, Oklahoma: Marlon Coleman
- First elected African-American female mayor of Mount Vernon, New York: Shawyn Patterson-Howard
- First African-American mayor of Elkhart, Indiana: Rod Roberson

=== 2021 ===
- First African American to be elected mayor of Alton, Illinois: David Goins
- First African American elected mayor of Bloomington, Illinois: Mboka Mwilambwe
- First African American to be elected mayor of Calumet City, Illinois: Thaddeus Jones
- First African American and first woman to serve as acting mayor of Boston: Kim Janey (upon the resignation of Marty Walsh to take the position of United States Secretary of Labor in the Cabinet of Joe Biden).
- First African American to be elected mayor of Kansas City, Kansas: Tyrone Garner
- First African American to be elected mayor of Libertyville, Illinois: Donna Johnson
- First African American to be elected mayor of Lynwood, Illinois: Jada Curry
- First African American to be elected mayor of Maplewood, Missouri: Nikylan Knapper
- First African American to be elected mayor of Pittsburgh, Pennsylvania: Edward C. Gainey
- First African American to be elected mayor of Little Elm, Texas: Curtis Cornelious
- First African-American woman to be elected mayor of St. Louis: Tishaura Jones
- First African-American woman to be elected mayor of Peekskill, New York: Vivian MacKenzie
- First African American to be elected mayor of Willard, Missouri: Samuel Snider
- First African American to be elected mayor of Wiggins, Mississippi: Darrell Berry
- First African American to be appointed mayor of Gresham, Oregon: Travis Stovall
- First African American to be elected mayor, and first elected mayor, of Cleveland Heights, Ohio: Kahlil Seren
- First African American to be elected mayor of Newbern, Alabama: Patrick Braxton
- First African American to be elected mayor of Beaver Falls, Pennsylvania: Kenya Johns
- First African American and first woman to be elected mayor of Peoria, Illinois: Rita Ali
- First African-American woman mayor of Durham, North Carolina: Elaine O'Neal

=== 2022 ===
- First African American to be elected mayor of Milwaukee: Cavalier Johnson
- First African American to be elected Mayor of Summerton, South Carolina: Tony Junious
- First woman to be elected mayor and first African-American mayor of Gettysburg, Pennsylvania: Rita Frealing
- First African American to be elected mayor in the state of Nevada and first African American to be elected as mayor of North Las Vegas, Nevada: Pamela Goynes-Brown
- First African-American mayor of Osceola, Arkansas: Joe Harris Jr.
- First African-American mayor of Brooklyn Park, Minnesota: Hollies Winston
- First African-American mayor of Danville, Kentucky: James J. H. Atkins
- First African-American mayor of Long Beach, California: Rex Richardson
- First woman and second African American elected mayor of Los Angeles: Karen Bass
- First African-American mayor of Culver City, California: Daniel Lee
- First African-American mayor of Santa Rosa, California: Natalie Rogers
- First Afro-Filipino mayor of Hercules, California: Alexander Walker-Griffin
- First African-American mayor of Calhoun City, Mississippi: Marshall W. Coleman
- First African-American mayor of Baldwyn, Mississippi: Roslynn Clark
- First African-American mayor of West Point, Mississippi: Rod Bobo
- First African-American mayor of St. Petersburg, Florida: Ken Welch
- First African-American woman mayor of West Chester, Pennsylvania: Lillian DeBaptiste

=== 2023 ===
- First African American to be appointed mayor of Waynesville, Missouri: Sean Avery Wilson
- First African American to be elected mayor of Carbondale, Illinois: Carolin Harvey
- First African American to be elected mayor of Colorado Springs, Colorado: Yemi Mobolade
- First African American to be elected mayor of Culver City, California: Yasmine-Imani McMorrin
- First African American to be appointed mayor of Hagerstown, Maryland: Tekesha Martinez
- First African American to be appointed mayor of Pinole, California: Devin Murphy

=== 2024 ===
- First African American to be elected mayor of Gaffney, South Carolina: Lyman Dawkins III
- First African American to be elected mayor of Tulsa, Oklahoma: Monroe Nichols
- First African American to be elected mayor of Mullins, South Carolina: Miko Pickett
- First African American to be elected mayor of White Plains, New York: Nadine Hunt-Robinson
- First African American to be elected mayor of Kingsport, Tennessee:Paul Montgomery
- First African American to be elected mayor of Princeton, Texas: Eugene Escobar Jr.
- First African American to be elected mayor of Neptune Township, New Jersey: Tassie York
- First African American to be elected mayor of Port Huron, Michigan: Anita Ashford
- First African-American woman to serve as mayor of Philadelphia, Pennsylvania: Cherelle Parker
- First African-American female mayor of Fort Wayne, Indiana: Sharon Tucker
- First African American mayor of Michigan City, Indiana: Angie Nelson-Deuitch
- First African American mayor of Evansville, Indiana: Stephanie Terry
- First African American mayor of Lawrence, Indiana: Deb Whitfield
- First African American mayor of Terre Haute, Indiana: Brandon Sakbun
- First African American mayor of Marion, Indiana and first African American Republican mayor in the state of Indiana: Ronald Morrell Jr.
- First African American mayor of North Charleston, South Carolina: Reggie L. Burgess

=== 2025 ===
- First African American mayor of Urbana, Illinois: DeShawn Williams
- First African-American woman mayor of Alexandria, Virginia: Alyia Gaskins
- First African American elected mayor and first black woman of Roxboro, North Carolina: Cynthia Petty
- First African American mayor elect and first Black woman of Conyers, Georgia: Connie Alsobrook
- First African American to be elected mayor of Roxboro, North Carolina: Cynthia Petty
- First African American woman to be elected mayor of Detroit: Mary Sheffield
- First African American and first African American woman to be elected mayor of Albany, New York: Dorcey Applyrs
- First African American and first African American woman to be elected mayor of Syracuse, New York: Sharon Owens
- First African American elected mayor of Omaha, Nebraska: John Ewing Jr.
- First African American elected mayor of Brockton, Massachusetts: Moises Rodrigues
- First African American woman to be elected mayor of Kansas City, Kansas: Christal Watson
- First African American to be elected mayor of El Paso, Texas: Renard Johnson
- First African American to be elected mayor of Waynesboro, Virginia: Kenny Lee
- First African American mayor of Bay Minette, Alabama: Joshua Brown
- First African-American woman mayor of Plymouth, North Carolina: Crystal Davis

== See also ==
- African American officeholders from the end of the Civil War until before 1900
- List of African-American firsts
- List of African-American U.S. state firsts
- List of African-American United States Cabinet members
- Timeline of the civil rights movement
