= Lathrop High School (Alaska) =

Coordinates: 64°50′08″N 147°43′58″W

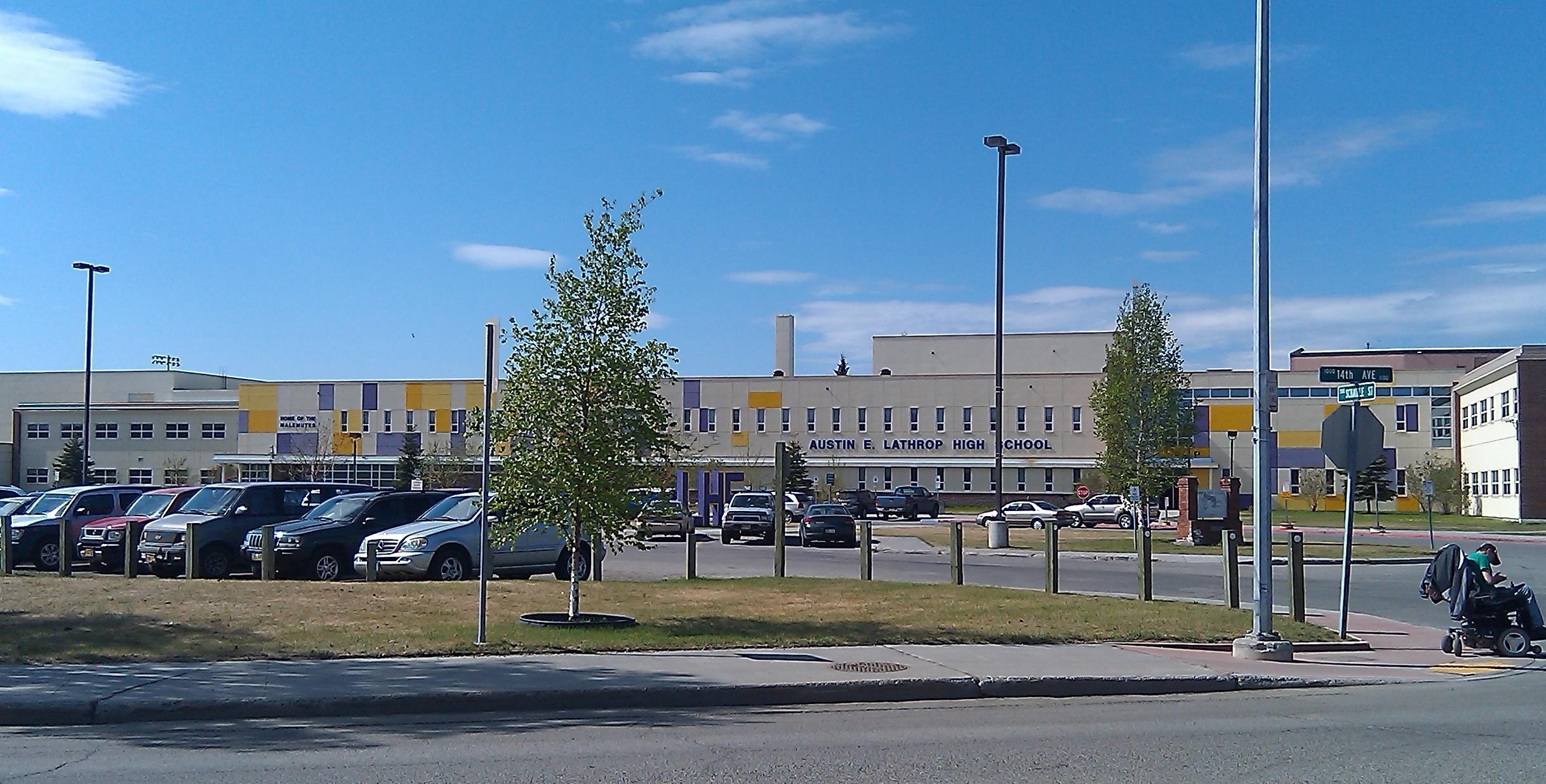

Location
- 901 Airport Way; Fairbanks, Alaska, 99701; United States

Information
- Type: Public secondary
- Established: 1955 (71 years ago)
- CEEB code: 020035
- Principal: Emily Jacobsen
- Teaching staff: 45.55 (FTE)
- Grades: 9–12
- Enrollment: 788 (2024–2025)
- Student to teacher ratio: 17.30
- Colors: Purple and gold
- Mascot: Malamutes
- Yearbook: Cache
- Website: www.k12northstar.org/lathrop

Lathrop High School is a public high school in Fairbanks in the U.S. state of Alaska, part of the Fairbanks North Star Borough School District. It is named for early Alaska businessman Austin E. "Cap" Lathrop. Lathrop serves the central part of the Fairbanks area, including downtown and the Fort Wainwright Army Post. With an enrollment of 1,047 as of October 1, 2014, it is Fairbanks's largest school.

== History ==
Lathrop High School's roots are directly traced to Fairbanks High School, reflecting what for many years was the only public school in Fairbanks.

Fairbanks formed an independent school district, a territorial-era device allowing for areas both inside and outside of incorporated cities to operate a combined school district for a community or region. As a result, Fairbanks experienced a period of rapid school construction during the 1950s.

Construction activities began on the first stand-alone high school for Fairbanks in early 1954, on land which had been deeded by homesteader Paul Rickert to the City of Fairbanks upon his death in 1938. The cornerstone was laid in October 1954. The school was dedicated on November 13, 1955, with the first classes starting on December 5, 1955. Lathrop still awards an "F" to its lettermen (as opposed to an "L" for Lathrop) to represent its roots as the original "Fairbanks High School."

The 1974–75 and 1975–76 school years at Lathrop were double shifted, with one shift of students attending school from 7 am to noon and the other shift attending from 1 pm to 6 pm. The terms "East Lathrop" and "West Lathrop" found their way into use during this time, which was met with protest by members of the Fairbanks chapter of the NAACP as a segregation ploy. In fall 1976, West Valley High School was opened, thus alleviating the overcrowding dilemma.

== Academics ==
AP classes are offered in Biology, US History, Microeconomics, European History, (U.S.) Government, Calculus (AB & BC), Statistics, (English) Composition, (English) Literature, Chemistry, Physics, and Computer Science.

The World Languages department offers Japanese and Spanish.

== Athletics ==
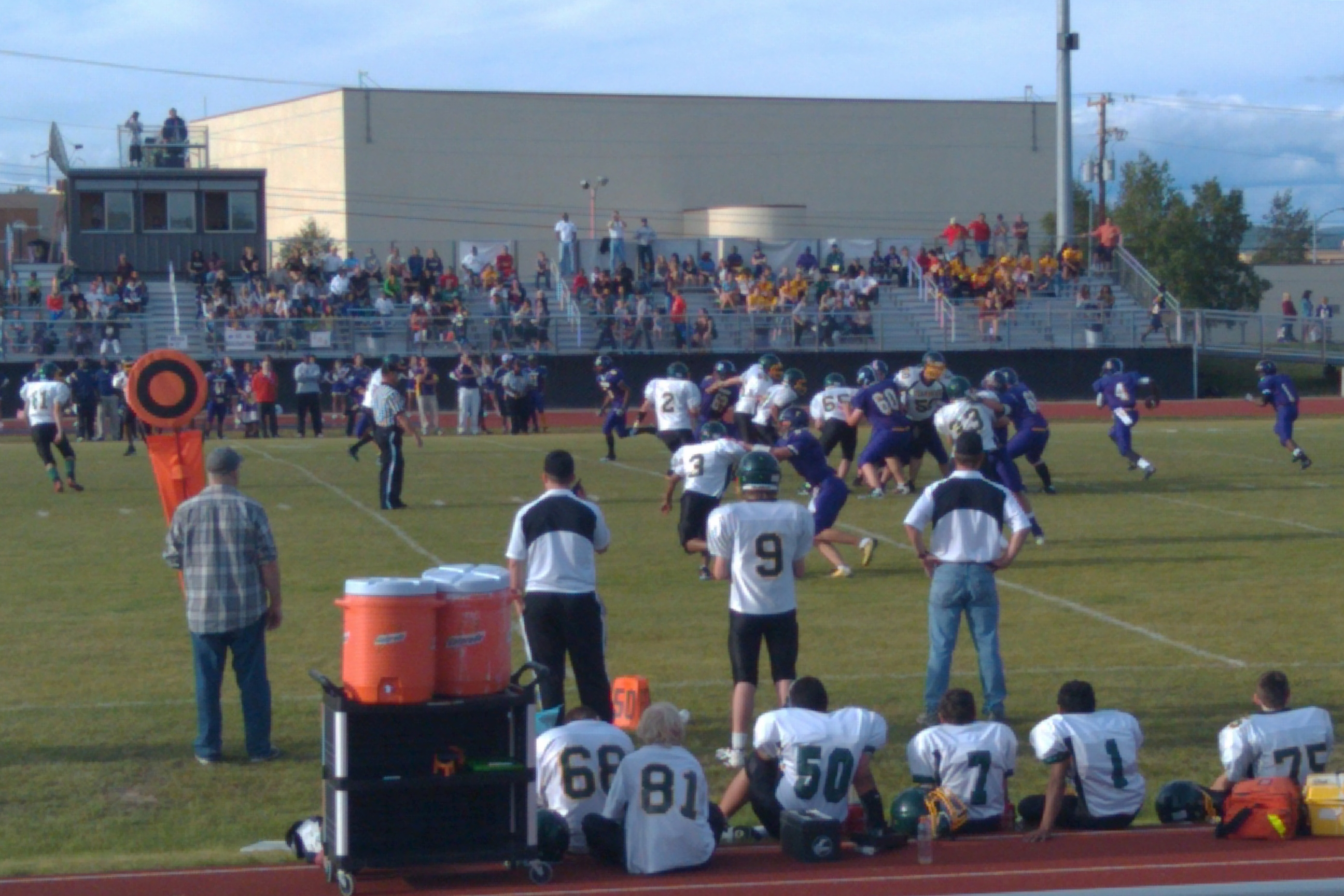
Lathrop's football team in a home game against Seward High School, August 2011.

In addition to many sports commonly found in other US high schools, Lathrop sponsors a cross-country skiing team. The rifle team has won many national awards. The girls' basketball team won the 4A State Championship in 1990 when the tournament was held at Patty Center on the UAF Campus. In 2009, the volleyball team won regionals and the hockey team won state. The Lathrop wrestling team won 4A State Championships in 1992, 2001, and 2017.

The football team has won three 2A state championships, going back to back in 2021 and 2022 before winning their third in 2026, all against Solodtna.

== Activities ==
The school has a ballroom dance club and team as well as a JROTC program. The Lathrop JROTC program as of 2006 is run by SAI CSM Robert Taylor and AI 1SGT. Uptcraft. The JROTC program has just under 100 cadets as of the 2008–2009 school year.

The Lathrop Academic Decathlon team has experienced state and national success. The team has taken the state title 17 out of the past 26 years, and has consistently placed in the top 4 in its division at Nationals for the past 7, including 1st places in Division 2 in 2024, and in Division 3 in 2026.

The school has a symphonic band and a jazz band as well as two orchestras and several different types of choirs. On December 7, 2011, Lathrop's symphonic band performed for the 70th anniversary of the attack on Pearl Harbor. The music groups have also combined to raise ten thousand dollars for the school with the help of a generous program.

== Notable alumni ==
- Justin Buchholz (2002), professional Mixed Martial Artist, formerly with the UFC
- James C. Hayes (1965), mayor of Fairbanks
- Georgianna Lincoln (1960), Alaska state legislator
- Steven Shane Bonham (1987), Former NFL player for the Detroit Lions
- Kelly Moneymaker (1985), Musician
- Reggie Tongue (1991), Former NFL player for the Kansas City Chiefs and Seattle Seahawks
