= Thomas O. Shores =

American politician

Mayor of Elyria, Ohio
- In office 1999–1999
- Preceded by: Michael B. Keys
- Succeeded by: Bill Grace

City Council of Elyria, Ohio
- In office 1983 – October 2002

Personal details
- Born: December 8, 1916 Belvidere, Tennessee
- Died: October 2002 (aged 85) Elyria, Ohio
- Party: Democratic
- Spouse: Jennie Irene Shores

Thomas O. Shores (December 8, 1916 – October 2002) was an American politician and community leader who served as a member of the Elyria City Council in Elyria, Ohio, representing the 5th Ward from 1983 until his death. He also served as president of the Elyria City Council from 1995 onward and briefly as acting mayor in 2000, making him the first African American to hold the office of mayor in Elyria.

== Early life and education ==
Thomas Oliver Shores was born on December 8, 1916, on a farm in Belvidere, Tennessee, the grandson of formerly enslaved African Americans. He later moved to Elyria, Ohio. He was employed for 45 years at the Elyria Foundry until his retirement in 1982.

== Political career ==
A lifelong Democrat, Shores entered local politics in the 1960s as a precinct committeeman for Elyria's 5th Ward, which comprised most of central and south Elyria. In 1983, he was elected to represent the 5th Ward on the Elyria City Council and served for 19 years until his death. In 1995, he became council president and held roles including vice chairman of the finance committee, chairman of the community development committee, and member of the strategic planning committee. He was re-elected in subsequent elections including the 2001 general election where he helped to secure Democratic control of the council. In December 1999, following the resignation of the incumbent mayor, Michal B. Keys, who has served for 20 consecutive years, Shores was named as acting mayor, becoming the first Black person to hold the office in Elyria's history.

== Death and legacy ==
Shores was married to Jennie Irene Shores He died in October 2002. In recognition of his long service and contributions Elyria, the Thomas O. Shores South Recreation Center in South Park was named in his honor. The facility includes basketball courts, a splash pad, playground equipment, tennis courts, picnic shelters, and restrooms, and serves as a community center for events, classes, and emergency services.

Shores was a longtime member of Second Baptist Church in Elyria where he served as a Sunday School teacher, treasurer, deacon, past church clerk, and member of the Greater Church Fellowship. Shores was also active in the Elyria NAACP, the Martin Luther King Jr. Day Commission, the Lorain County Alliance, the Envision 2000 steering committee, the Molders Union, the Boy Scouts (as past committee chairman and institutional representative), the Little League, and federal housing improvement programs that led to Riverside Homes. His family, including descendants involved in local politics and community efforts, has continued to highlight his legacy in Elyria's Black community. His granddaughter Brenda Warren has run for the 5th Ward council seat.

== See also ==
- List of first African-American mayors
