= Charles Christian Hammer =

American classical guitarist

Charles Christian "Sir Charles" Hammer (17 May 1952 – 18 February 2004) was an American classical guitarist.

Charles Christian Hammer was born in Chicago and grew up in Riverdale, Illinois. Hammer took up the guitar in his youth after hearing The Beatles on The Ed Sullivan Show. He purchased his first guitar with earnings from a newspaper route. Hammer was influenced heavily by The Beatles throughout his career.

During the 1970s Hammer moved to Mexico where he studied Spanish guitar. Hammer stated that his nickname, "Sir Charles", was given to him about this time by a "fairy princess" with golden hair, but it is more probable that the nickname arose from comments about the styling of his blond hair or the baroque puffy-sleeved shirts he wore on stage.

In the 1980s Hammer moved back to the United States, establishing himself as a local act in the small artist's retreat of Eureka Springs, Arkansas, where he performed at weddings and parties.

During this time and into the 1990s Hammer experimented in the studio. He generated 11 albums that combined electric and classical guitar but fell short of his long established goal of producing 30 albums during his lifetime.

In the late 1990s, Hammer taught guitar and music history at the University of Arkansas at Fayetteville and earned a Bachelor of Arts degree and a master's degree in music. In 1998 he was awarded a music composition fellowship by the Arkansas Arts Council. Hammer's final album was a classical guitar rendering of several of his favorite Beatles songs.

Just prior to his death Hammer began to experience some commercial success in the foreign market and was scheduled to tour three cities in Mexico. Hammer was a much-loved figure in Eureka Springs, especially by the local children for whom he put on school concerts.

In 2003 he was diagnosed with lung cancer. Charles Christian Hammer died on 18 February 2004 at St. Mary's Hospital in Rogers, Arkansas. Hammer was survived by his long-time partner, Poco Carter, and their dog Prema.
