= Zenovia Evans =

American politician

Mayor of Riverdale, Illinois
- In office 2001–2009
- Preceded by: Joseph C. Szabo
- Succeeded by: Deyon L. Dean

Zenovia G. Evans is an American politician who served as Mayor (Village President) of Riverdale, Illinois, a working-class suburb of Chicago, for two terms from 2001 to 2009.

== Political career ==
Evans was appointed acting mayor in November 2001 following the resignation of the village's previous mayor, Joseph C. Szabo. She then won election to a full term in April 2001 running on a platform of affordable housing initiatives, community development, employer-assisted homeownership programs, and economic recovery efforts. She was re-elected to a second term on April 5, 2005, defeating opponents Herman Shaun Hardin and Nkrumah Lumumba Hopkins.

In November 2002, Evans launched an employer-assisted housing program to encourage village employees to purchase homes in Riverdale. The initiative provided $5,000 toward a down payment (matched up to $10,000 with Illinois Housing Development Authority funds), with a five-year residency requirement. She promoted Riverdale's stock of affordable brick bungalows and Georgians, noting that most village employees commuted from elsewhere due to concerns about schools, crime, and local businesses. The program aimed to build a more invested local workforce. Evans also led efforts to preserve deteriorating neighborhoods, including the Pacesetter subdivision where she had once lived, as part of broader regional affordable housing campaigns in the Chicago area.

During the 2008–2009 economic downturn, she advocated for federal stimulus funds to reach small suburbs like Riverdale. She pushed for infrastructure projects, including $10 million in sewer repairs on the village's north end, union construction jobs, foreclosure prevention, and mixed-income housing development to strengthen the local tax base for schools and services.

In April 2009, the Illinois House of Representatives passed House Resolution 0179 honoring Evans for her public service as mayor. Secretary of State Jesse White also publicly praised her efforts on behalf of the Riverdale library.

In the April 7, 2009 election, Evans (endorsed by U.S. Rep. Jesse Jackson Jr., state Sen. James Meeks, and Cook County Commissioner Deborah Sims) was defeated by village trustee Deyon L. Dean, who received 63 percent of the vote in a multi-candidate race. Voters sought more youth recreation, commercial development, transparency, and new leadership.

== See also ==
- List of first African-American mayors
