= James C. Hayes =

American politician (1946–2022)

Mayor of Fairbanks
- In office 1992–2001
- Preceded by: Wayne S. Nelson
- Succeeded by: Steve M. Thompson

Member of the Fairbanks City Council
- In office 1987–1992

Personal details
- Born: May 25, 1946 Sacramento, California, US
- Died: June 9, 2022 (aged 76)
- Education: BA (education) University of Alaska

James C. Hayes (May 25, 1946 – June 9, 2022) was an American politician who served as the mayor of Fairbanks, Alaska (1992-2001), the first African-American mayor in the state of Alaska.

In 2008, he received a federal felony conviction for diverting federal funds intended for a charity.

== Biography ==
Hayes was born in Sacramento, California, the son of Juanita (née Metoyer) and Caustella Hayes. In 1955, his family moved to Fairbanks and in 1965, he graduated from Lathrop High School in Fairbanks. In 1970, he graduated with a BA in education with minors in sociology and psychology from the University of Alaska.1.

== Political career ==
Hayes served on the Fairbanks City Council from 1987 to 1992. He then served for three terms as mayor (1992-2001).

== Conviction ==
Hayes and his wife, Chris, were board members of a charitable group that provided services to "low income and disadvantaged youth" in Fairbanks. In 2008, they were both convicted of diverting funds for their personal use and of "money laundering for trying to conceal the diversion of funds." Hayes was sentenced to 66 months in federal prison.

== Personal life ==
In 1974, he married Chris Parham; they had two children, LaNene Hayes-Scott and James Hayes Jr. He was a member of the Church of God in Christ.

Hayes died on June 9, 2022, aged 76.

== See also ==
- List of first African-American mayors
