= LaVertha Gotier =

American politician (1935–2023)

Mayor of Worland, Wyoming
- In office 2001–2004
- Preceded by: Herm Emmett
- Succeeded by: Lawrence Shearer

Personal details
- Born: October 20, 1935 Texas
- Died: August 8, 2023 (aged 87) Denver, Colorado
- Spouse: Roy Gotier
- Children: 4

LaVertha Gotier (October 20, 1935 – August 8, 2023) was an American politician who served as mayor of Worland, Wyoming from 2001 to 2004. She was the first African American elected as mayor in the state of Wyoming.

== Early life and education ==
LaVertha Gotier was born on October 20, 1935, in Texas. She moved with her husband who worked for Marathon Oil to Worland in 1977 where they were one of two Black families in the small community.

== Political career ==
In 2001, Gotier was elected mayor of Worland, a small city in Washakie County with a population of around 5,000 at the time. She served one term from 2001 to 2004. Her election marked a historic milestone as the first Black person elected to a mayoral position in Wyoming. During her tenure, she was involved in key local initiatives. She helped to secure the passage of a one-cent sales tax that benefited the city and advocated for community development. Gotier represented Worland at state-level forums, including the Wind/Bighorn River Basin Advisory Group meeting in 2002. In 2002, she launched an annual community event intended to showcase Worland's diversity which ran for over two decades before concluding.

After leaving the mayoral office, Gotier ran for Washakie County commissioner in 2006 as a Democrat but was unsuccessful. Gotier remained engaged in Worland community activities after her term including participation in local golf events and other civic roles.

== Death and legacy ==
She died on August 8, 2023, in Denver, Colorado. At a subsequent Worland City Council meeting, Mayor Jim Gill remembered her as "quite a gal" who contributed significantly to the city and noted she would be "gone but not forgotten." Community tributes described her as an "amazing lady," a "wonderful mayor," and one of Worland's best representatives in state matters.

== See also ==
- List of first African-American mayors
