= Rickey Williams Jr. =

American politician (born 1977/78)

Mayor of Danville, Illinois
- Incumbent
- Assumed office November 6, 2018
- Preceded by: Scott Eisenhauer

City Council of Danville, Illinois
- In office 2009–2018

Personal details
- Born: 1977 or 1978 (age 47–48)
- Education: B.A. Millikin University
- Alma mater: Emory University

Rickey Williams Jr. (born 1977/1978) is an American politician who is the first African-American to serve as mayor of Danville, Illinois, the county seat of Vermilion County.

== Biography ==
Raised in Danville, Williams is the son of Laura and Ricky Williams Sr. His mother was an adult educator and his father was an assistant warden at the Danville Correctional Center and a teacher at the Danville Area Community College. He has a younger sister. He graduated from Millikin University with a B.A. in political science. He then attended the PhD program at Emory University but left on a Christian missions trip to Malawi before completing his dissertation. He returned to the US and served as a residential missionary in Clarkston, Georgia, and in 2006, as executive director of the local Boys & Girls Club.

In 2009, he won election to the Danville City Council. In 2011, he ran for mayor, finishing in 3rd place. In October 2018, he was named as acting mayor by the City Council after the early resignation of Scott Eisenhauer, who had served as mayor for over 15 years in order to take a position as village administrator in Rantoul, Illinois. He was sworn in on November 6, 2018. In the general election held on April 2, 2019, running on a platform of community policing and fiscal responsibility, he won election to a full 4-year term with 47.8% of the vote defeating businessowner James McMahon (24.0%), Alderman and businessman Steve Nichols (19.0%), and Danville Code Enforcement Inspector Donald Crews (8.8%). Danville was roughly 56% white, 33% Black, and 7% Hispanic at the time. He was sworn in on May 7, 2019.

While mayor, he solicited funds to demolish the Collins Tower, a Danville landmark built in 1917 and listed on the National Register of Historic Places.

Under his leadership, Danville was named one of the most dangerous cities in the country and the second most dangerous in the Midwest. The same study found Danville the 6th most dangerous metro area in the country in 2020 and the most dangerous metro area in the state.

Before the 2023 municipal election cycle, he supported the Danville City Council in their efforts to raise the mayor's salary from $75,000 to $110,000.

On April 4, 2023, Rickey Williams Jr. won a second term as mayor, defeating opponent Jackie Vinson by a narrow 59 votes out of 4454 votes cast.

On May 2, 2023, Rickey Williams Jr. cast the deciding vote in a 7–7 split City Council to approve an ordinance restricting the delivery of medication and paraphernalia intended for abortions in the city of Danville. The controversial ordinance faced opposition from the ACLU of Illinois and some residents, who argue that it violates state law, particularly the Reproductive Health Act. The ordinance also faced criticism for being unenforceable and causing confusion. Despite these concerns, the ordinance was passed, with supporters citing religious and moral reasons. The ACLU of Illinois is evaluating next steps to challenge the unlawful ordinance, and the Attorney General's office has stated it is prepared to take appropriate action.

During Williams' second term, the Quaker Oats factory, a fixture in the Danville area for 65 years, announced they would be ceasing production and closing permanently, effective June 8, 2024.

Under Williams, the city made national headlines with a Wall Street Journal article criticizing Danville and other municipalities nationwide for misappropriating COVID-19 funds. Out of the $26 million received from the federal government, Danville spent approximately half on a new water park.

== See also ==
- List of first African-American mayors

Preceded by Scott Eisenhauer	Mayor of Danville, Illinois; 2018–Present	Succeeded by
