= Albert Johnson (New Mexico politician) =

American politician

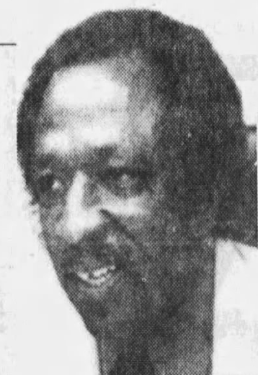

Mayor of Las Cruces, New Mexico
- In office March 15, 1976 – 1980

Personal details
- Born: Albert Norris Johnson; 1934/1935 Lebanon, Tennessee, U.S.
- Died: December 5, 1984
- Party: Democratic
- Spouse: Elmira
- Children: 3
- Education: Tennessee State University

Albert Norris Johnson (1934 or 1935 – December 5, 1984) was an American politician who served as the mayor of Las Cruces, New Mexico. Johnson also received multiple gubernatorial appointments to state commissions. He was the first black person to serve as a mayor in New Mexico.

== Early life and education ==
Albert Norris Johnson was born in 1934 or 1935 in Lebanon, Tennessee, to Allen P. Johnson and Louise Rucks. He graduated from Pearl High School. In 1958, he graduated from Tennessee State University with a civil engineering degree.

== Career ==
After graduating from college, Johnson took a job at White Sands Missile Range and later served as the environmental improvement coordinator for the missile range.

Johnson entered politics when he was selected to serve as president of the Las Cruces, New Mexico NAACP chapter. During the 1960s he served as chairman of the Doña Ana County NAACP and as president of the New Mexico NAACP, which he served as until his election to the Las Cruces city commission.

=== Las Cruces politics ===
On February 5, 1968, Johnson filed to run for a seat on the Las Cruces, New Mexico city commission from the 4th district. He defeated Jerry K. Moore in the election and was the first black person elected to the Las Cruces city commission. On March 18, 1968, Johnson was sworn into the city commission from the 4th district.

In 1969, Governor David Cargo appointed Johnson to serve as a member of the Fair Employment Practices Commission to fill the unexpired term of J. H. Horton which lasted until April 29, 1971. Cargo also appointed Johnson to the Commission on Human Rights, which was created to replace the Fair Employment Practices Commission, and he was selected to serve as the chairman of the commission. In 1970, Johnson's appointment to the Commission on Human Rights was approved by the New Mexico Senate.

On February 1, 1972, Johnson filed to run for reelection to the Las Cruces city commission and defeated five other candidates in the election. On February 5, 1973, he was reappointed to the Human Rights Commission by Governor Bruce King to a term that would end in December 1976.

In 1975, a recall attempt was brought against the five members of the Las Cruces city commission, but only one member, M. C. Thomson, was successfully recalled while the four other members, including Johnson, remained in office.

On April 29, 1975, Johnson was selected to serve as chairman of the South Rio Grande Council of Governments. Johnson was also selected to serve as chairman of the Region V Commission of the Governor's Council on Criminal Justice Planning by Governor Apodaca.

Johnson won reelection to the Las Cruces city commission in March 1976, against Ben Romero and Robert L. Stryker, and on March 15, 1976, the city commission voted three to two, after five minutes of voting, to select Johnson to serve as mayor. T. J. Graham was selected to serve as mayor pro tem. In December 1976, he was reappointed by Governor Jerry Apodaca to the Human Rights commission to a term ending in December 1980.

In 1978, Johnson was initially reelected as mayor by a vote of two to zero, with him claiming that a third vote from him was uncounted, but a plurality of three votes was required so another vote was held, which came out three to two. Johnson chose to not seek reelection in 1980.

During the 1976 presidential election, Johnson presented the key to the city of Las Cruces to presidential candidate Mo Udall.

== Personal life ==
Johnson and his wife, Elmira, had three children. One of his children, Albert Johnson Jr., served as a delegate for Jesse Jackson during the 1988 Democratic presidential primaries.

On December 5, 1984, Johnson died from leukemia at age 49. In 1989, Johnson was inducted into the Democratic Party of New Mexico's Hall of Fame alongside former Representative Harold L. Runnels. In 2004, he was inducted into the New Mexico Hall of Fame.

== Electoral history ==
1975 Las Cruces, New Mexico recall election
Party	Candidate	Votes	%
Nonpartisan	Against recall of Johnson	4,199	59.80%
Nonpartisan	For recall of Johnson	2,823	40.20%
Total votes		7,022	100.00%

1976 Las Cruces, New Mexico mayoral election (Note: Mayor of Las Cruces is elected amongst the members of the City Council.)
Party	Candidate	Votes	%
Nonpartisan	Albert Johnson	3	60%
Nonpartisan	Carlos Blanco	2	40%
Total votes		5	100%

== See also ==
- List of first African-American mayors
