= Pacesetter Gardens Historic District =

Historic district in Illinois, United States

- U.S. National Register of Historic Places
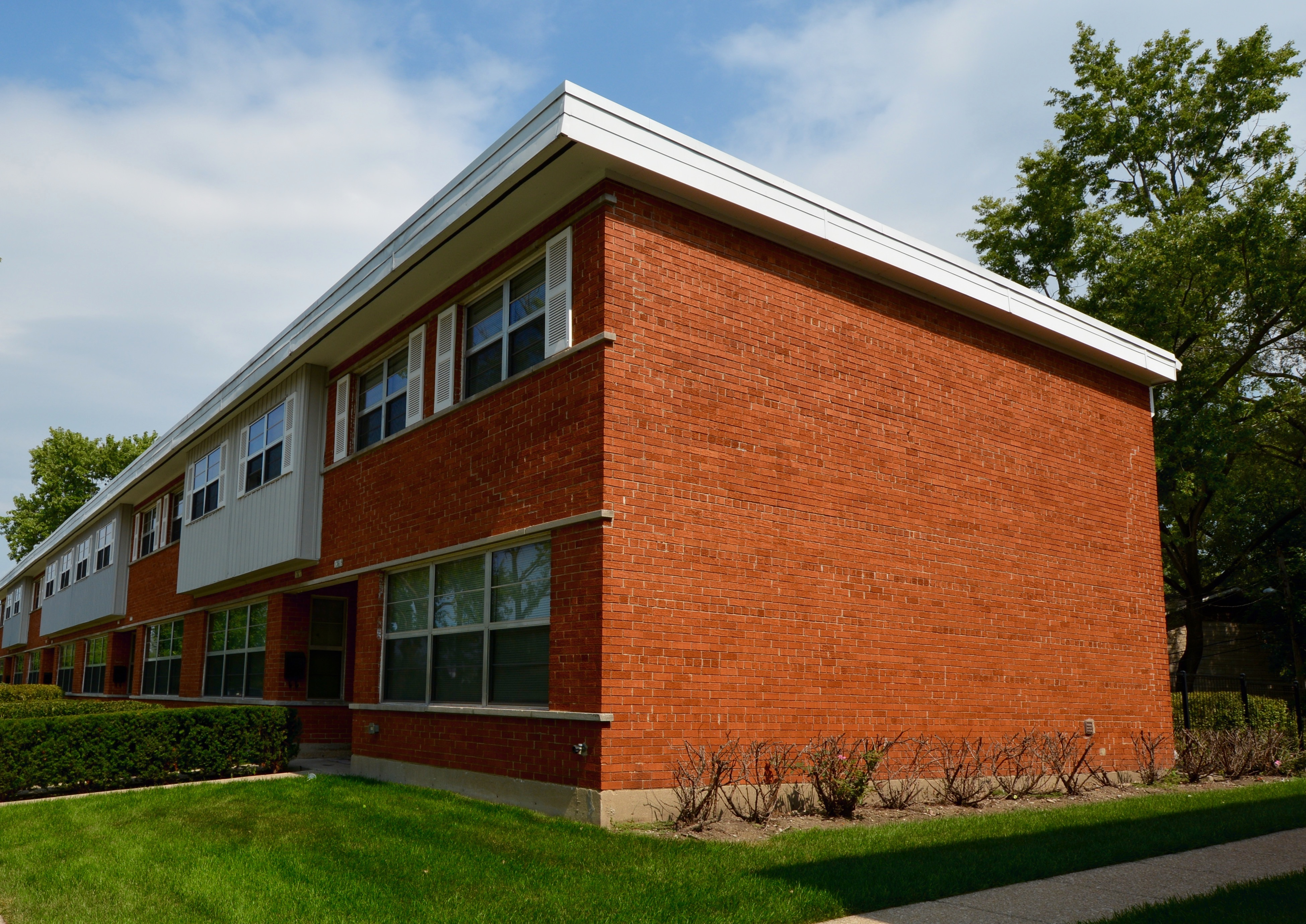

- Location within Chicago metropolitan area Location within Illinois Location within the United States
- Location: 13604-13736 S. Lowe Ave., Riverdale, Illinois
- Coordinates: 41°38′48″N 87°38′14″W
- Area: 7.3 acres (3.0 ha)
- Architect: Harry J. Quinn
- NRHP reference No.: 05001252
- Added to NRHP: November 16, 2005

The Pacesetter Gardens Historic District is a historic district encompassing twelve townhouses along South Lowe Avenue in Riverdale, Illinois. The townhouses were built in 1960 by Harry J. Quinn, a developer who constructed and advocated for multi-family housing. Prior to 1960, Riverdale was mainly a community of single-family homes; Pacesetter Gardens and another nearby development by Quinn diversified the city's housing and made it easier for lower-income residents to live there. Quinn, who was also an architect, designed the buildings, which feature simple exteriors with box bay windows and a horizontal emphasis. Ten of the twelve townhouses have eight units, while the remaining two have four and six respectively. Quinn planned each unit according to minimum house design, a technique popular with housing reformers that emphasized compactness and eliminated less essential rooms such as hallways and dining rooms.

The district was added to the National Register of Historic Places on November 16, 2005.
