= Sarah Feinberg =

American political communications operative and transport executive

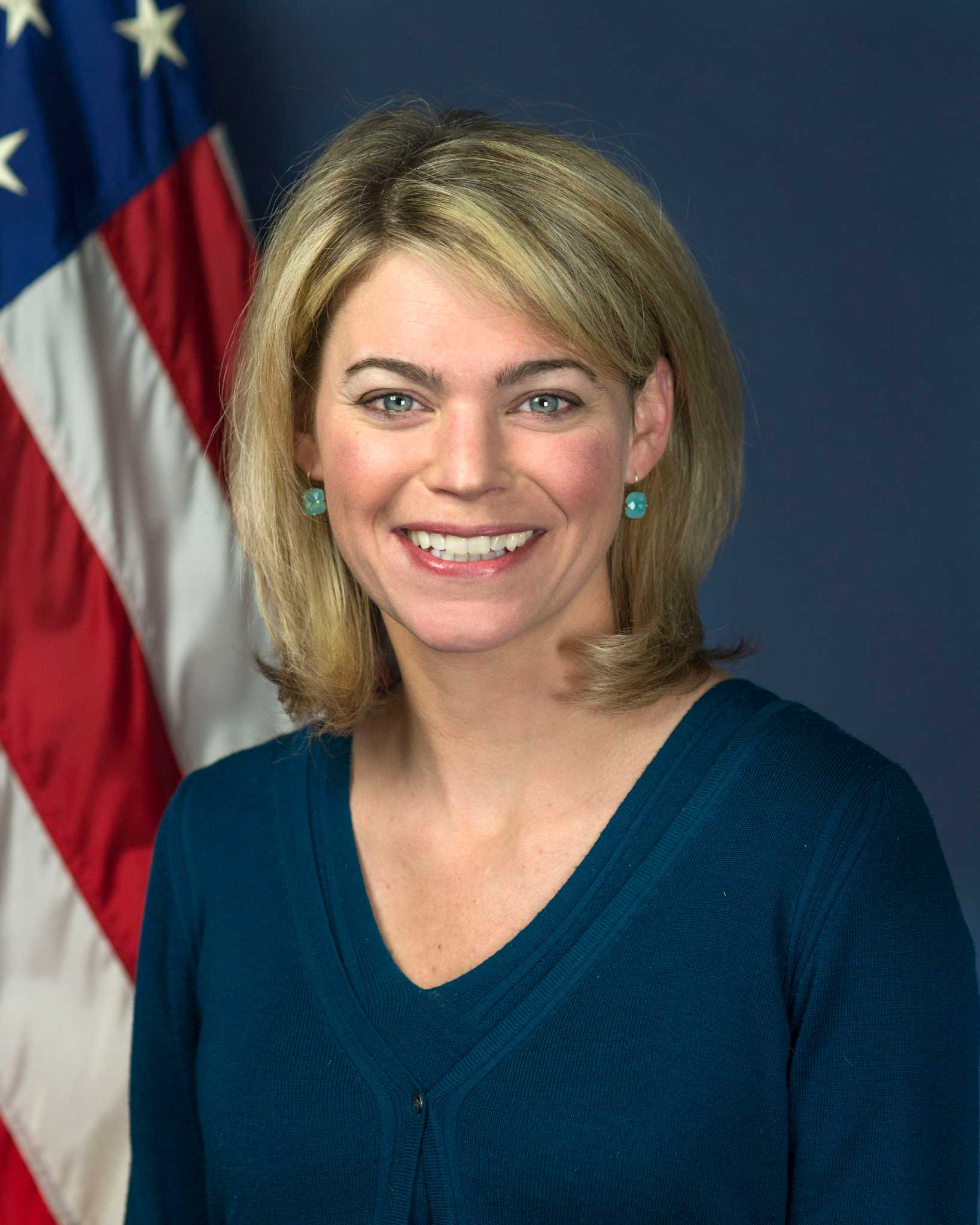
- Official portrait, 2014

President of the New York City Transit Authority
- Interim
- In office March 2, 2020 – July 2021
- Governor: Andrew Cuomo
- Preceded by: Andy Byford
- Succeeded by: Craig Cipriano (interim); Richard A. Davey

Administrator of the Federal Railroad Administration
- In office 2015–2017
- President: Barack Obama
- Preceded by: Joseph C. Szabo
- Succeeded by: Ronald Batory

Personal details
- Born: October 3, 1977 (age 49) Charleston, West Virginia, U.S.
- Party: Democratic
- Spouse: Daniel Pfeiffer (m. 2006; div. 2011)
- Domestic partner: Josh Tyrangiel
- Education: Washington and Lee University (BA); National Defense University

Sarah Elizabeth Feinberg (born October 3, 1977) is an American civic employee who previously served as the Interim President of the New York City Transit Authority from 2020 to 2021, and a former Administrator of the Federal Railroad Administration. She was nominated for the role of MTA Chairperson but was ultimately not selected for the position. Her background is mostly in communications. She has held communications roles at Bloomberg LP and Facebook, and served in the Obama administration as special assistant to the president and senior advisor to White House Chief of Staff Rahm Emanuel.

== Early life and education ==
Feinberg is a native of Charleston, West Virginia. Her father is attorney Lee Franklin Feinberg, a West Virginia state legislator, and her mother is Mary Elizabeth Stanley, until 2013 a U.S. District Court judge in West Virginia.

She attended Washington and Lee University, where she obtained a B.A. in Politics in 1999. She also attended National Defense University in 2008-09, studying Middle East foreign policy.

== Early career ==
Feinberg spent a number of years on Capitol Hill beginning in 1999, including working for the Senate Veterans Affairs Committee, as the communications director for the House Democratic Caucus, the press secretary at the Democratic Congressional Campaign Committee, and the national press secretary to then-Senate Minority Leader Tom Daschle.

From 2009-10, she served in the Obama administration as special assistant to the president, and senior advisor to White House Chief of Staff Rahm Emanuel.

== Career ==
=== Communications ===
Feinberg served as Bloomberg LP’s Global Communications Director (2010-11), and as the Director of Policy and Crisis Communications at Facebook (2011-13).

In 2017 she founded Feinberg Strategies, LLC, a strategic business and communications consulting practice focused on the tech sector.

=== Transportation ===
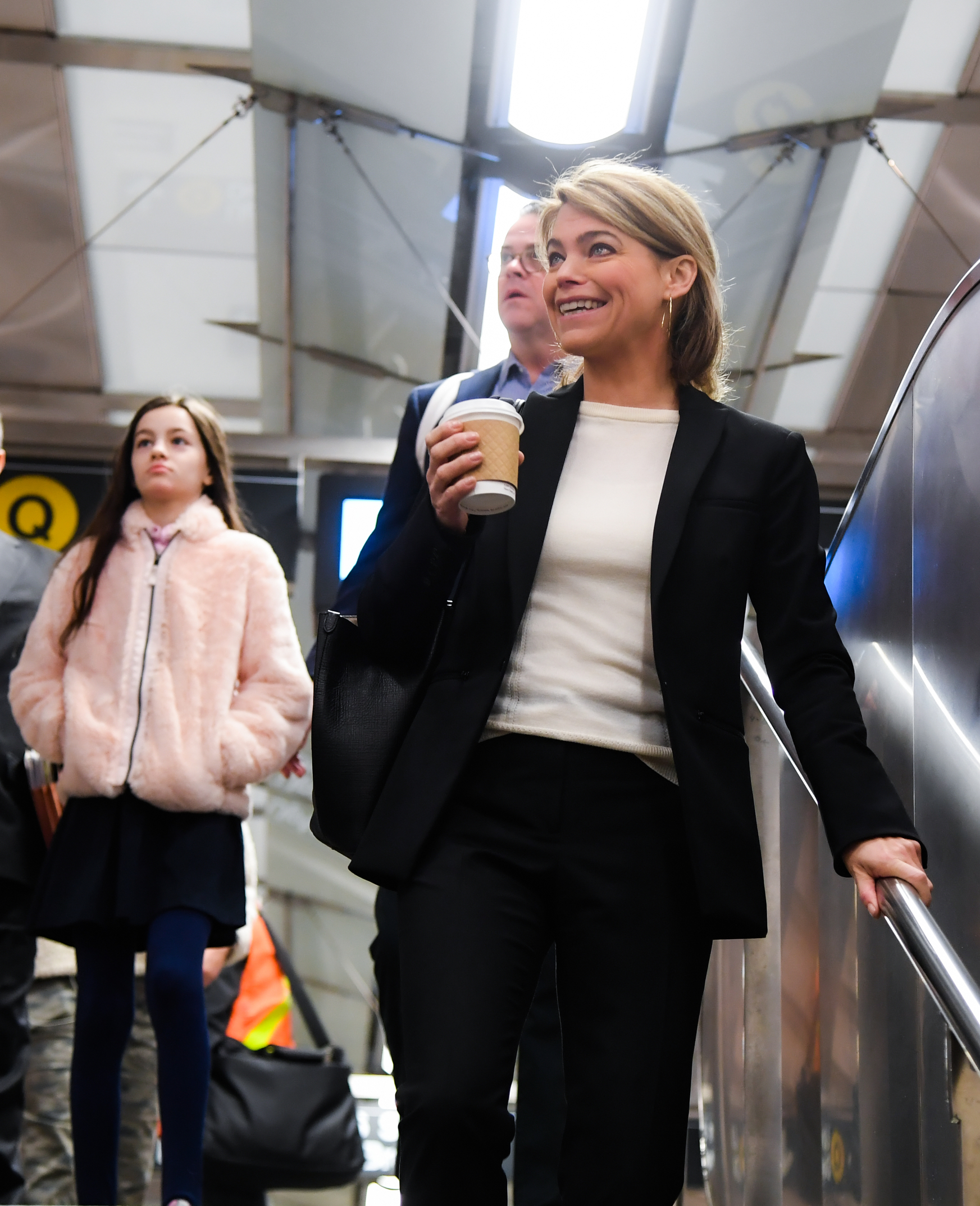
Feinberg's first day as Interim President of New York City Transit Authority.

From 2013 to 2015 she served as chief of staff of United States Secretary of Transportation Anthony R. Foxx in the US Department of Transportation, providing strategic advice and counsel to the Secretary regarding operational and legislative initiatives.

Feinberg, from 2015 to 2017, served as the 13th Administrator of the Federal Railroad Administration, the safety regulator of the U.S. rail system, becoming the second woman in history to do so. She was nominated for the post by President Obama in June 2015, and confirmed by the U.S. Senate. Feinberg served on the Amtrak board of directors during that time, and has been a member of the Northeast Corridor Commission, starting in 2015. Feinberg was instrumental in helping Governor Andrew Cuomo resolve a LIRR dispute in 2016.

Beginning in February 2019, she was a member of the Metropolitan Transportation Authority (MTA) Board, where she was the Transit Committee Chair. In March 2020, Cuomo appointed her interim President of the New York City Transit Authority after the resignation of Andy Byford. She stepped away from her position as an MTA Board member to serve. On June 8, 2021, Cuomo nominated Feinberg to be chairperson of the MTA, succeeding Pat Foye, who had been both chairperson and CEO. Due to opposition to splitting the top role between two people, the state Senate did not act on her nomination; as a result, Feinberg left the MTA on July 30, 2021.

=== Other work ===
Feinberg currently serves on the Southwest Airlines and StoryCorps board of directors. She is currently a Senior Advisor at the MarTech startup, Applecart.

== Personal ==
She is a resident of the East Village in Manhattan, New York City, with her partner and daughter. She was previously married to Dan Pfeiffer.

Political offices
Preceded by Joseph C. Szabo	Administrator of the Federal Railroad Administration; 2015–2017	Succeeded by Patrick Warren; Acting
