= Cornell Harvey =

American politician

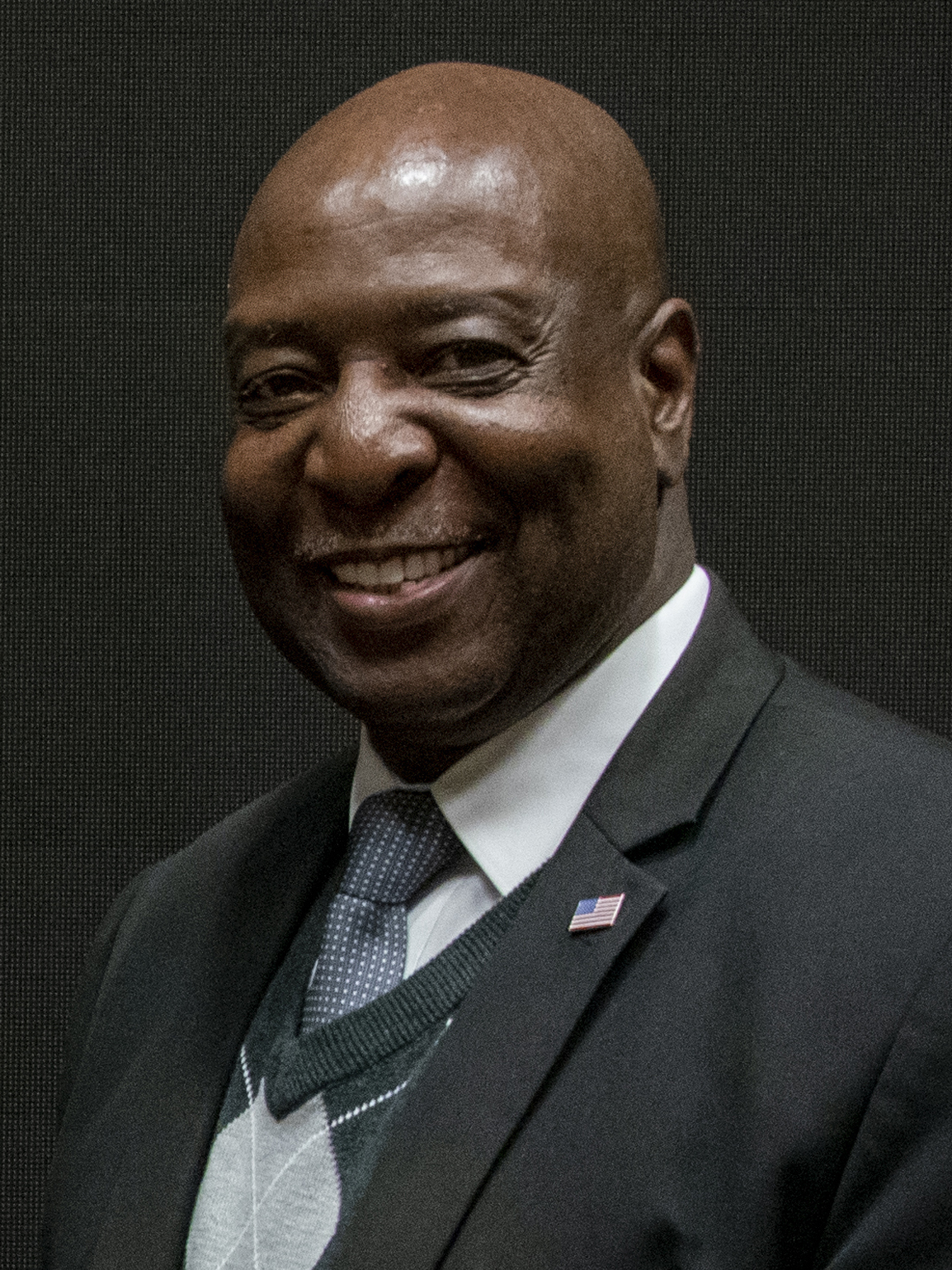

59th Mayor of Brunswick, Georgia
- In office January 8, 2014 – January 5, 2022
- Preceded by: Bryan Thompson
- Succeeded by: Cosby H. Johnson

Personal details
- Born: 1953 (age 71–72) Brunswick, Georgia, U.S.
- Political party: Democratic

Cornell Harvey is a politician in Georgia. He was the 59th Mayor of Brunswick, Georgia, serving from 2014 to early 2022, and was the first African-American to hold the position. Harvey is a member of the Democratic Party, and he served in the US Air Force.

== Education ==
Harvey attended Glynn County Public Schools including Perry Elementary, Risley Elementary, Molette Jr. High, and Glynn Academy in Brunswick, Georgia. During his time in the Air Force, he received an associate degree in Systems Management from the Community College of the Air Force, a bachelor's degree in Systems Management from the University of Maryland, and a master's degree in Public Administration from Troy State University.

=== Military service ===
Harvey served in the United States Air Force for 29 years, enlisting in October 1971 and retiring in October 2000. In the course of his service, he attained the rank of Chief Master Sergeant (E-9).

== See also ==
- List of first African-American mayors
