= Frances Huntley-Cooper =

American politician

Frances Huntley-Cooper is the former mayor of Fitchburg, Wisconsin, and was the first African American mayor elected to office in the state of Wisconsin. She was elected on April 2, 1991, and served from 1991 to 1993.

She is serving as an elected board of trustees member and board chair with Madison Area Technical College, where she is serving her third appointment.

== Education ==
Frances Huntley-Cooper is a 1973 graduate from North Carolina Agricultural and Technical State University, where she received her Bachelor of Science Degree in Social Services. She then graduated from the University of Wisconsin–Madison, in 1974, where she received a Masters of Science Degree in Social Work. She returned to the La Follette Institute and completed her Masters of Arts in Public Policy and Administration in August 1994.

== Career ==
Huntley-Cooper had a 28-year career in social services as a social work supervisor for the Dane County Department of Human Services working with children, youth and families. Huntley-Cooper was appointed by Governor James Doyle to work the in Department of Workforce Development under Secretary Roberta Gassman. Frances assumed administrator of Wisconsin Worker's Compensation Division on February 24, 2003 – December 31, 2010.

In September 2003, Huntley-Cooper was elected as a member-at-large to serve on the International Association of Industrial Accident Boards and Commissions (IAIABC). Huntley-Cooper served as chair of EDI (Electronic data interchange) Council since first elected 2005–2008. She was a member of the Council of Committee Chairs. In September 2007, she was elected to serve as vice president of the IAIABC. In September 2009, she was installed as the international president of IAIABC.

== Community service ==
Huntley-Cooper is actively involved in community organizations in Madison, Wisconsin. She is a charter member of the Alpha Kappa Alpha sorority – Kappa Psi Omega chapter – and served as president from 2009 to 2012. She is on the board for the Capital City Hues newspaper. She has been honored as a YWCA Women of Distinction. Huntley-Cooper is also a recipient of Wisconsin Women in Government, Inc. - Woman of Achievement. Additionally, Huntley-Cooper served four years as president of the Madison branch of the National Association for the Advancement of Colored People (NAACP).

Huntley-Cooper is a 3-year breast cancer survivor and an active member of Susan G. Komen Race for the Cure.

== Political appointments ==
Huntley-Cooper served as District 1 Alderwoman for four years beginning in 1987, during which time she chaired the finance and personnel committees. Huntley-Cooper's Common Council activity culminated in service as president of the Fitchburg Common Council in 1990. Huntley-Cooper served as Fitchburg mayor from 1991 to 1993, and is the first African- American elected to lead a Wisconsin City.

She was elected as a Barack Obama delegate to the 2008 Democratic Convention (Denver, Colorado), and in January 2009, after he was elected she attended his inauguration as the US 44th President in Washington, D.C. Additionally, Huntley-Cooper was elected to be a delegate to the National Democratic Convention which convened in Charlotte, North Carolina, September 3–6, 2012. Prior to these national conventions, Huntley-Cooper served as a Jessie Jackson delegate for the Democratic National (Atlanta, Georgia, 1998) and Bill Clinton delegate (New York, New York, 1992).

== See also ==
- List of first African-American mayors
