= Josh Tyrangiel =

American journalist

- Tyrangiel at the 2026 Texas Book Festival
- Born: September 25, 1972 (age 54)
- Education: University of Pennsylvania (BA); Yale University (MA)
- Occupations: journalist, music critic
- Years active: 1999–present
- Partner: Sarah Feinberg
- Children: 2

Josh Tyrangiel is an American journalist. He was previously the deputy managing editor of TIME magazine and an editor at Bloomberg Businessweek. In June 2019, Tyrangiel left the network, following the cancellation of Vice News Tonight.

== Early life and education ==
Josh Tyrangiel was born on September 25, 1972, and was raised in Baltimore. He has a sister. He graduated high school from the Park School of Baltimore in 1990 where he played on the soccer team and was active in student government. For his senior-year project, he called the Baltimore Orioles and successfully got a position as a member of the grounds crew, where he worked for six months.

After graduating from the Park School, Tyrangiel attended the University of Pennsylvania where he majored in English and American history and worked for The Daily Pennsylvanian. He received his master's degree in American Studies from Yale University.

== Career ==
After college, Tyrangiel worked at Vibe and Rolling Stone magazines and produced the news at MTV. In 1999, he joined TIME as a staff writer and music critic. He also served as the magazine's London correspondent and national editor. In 2006, Tyrangiel was promoted to deputy managing editor at TIME.com, as well as tasked with overseeing TIME's Person of the Year franchise.

In journalistic circles, Tyrangiel was presumed to be the successor to Richard Stengel, who was editor of the magazine at that time. Tyrangiel says he wanted the job, but recognized there was competition for the position and that the company may be resistant to his hopes of taking it in a new direction. Norman Pearlstine, who had been the Editor in Chief at Time Inc and was then working as the Chief Content Officer at Bloomberg L.P., invited him to breakfast, and suggested he go to struggling Businessweek following its acquisition by Bloomberg L.P. for “one dollar plus debt." Tyrangiel presented his ideas for the company to Bloomberg and, in November 2009, Tyrangiel was named editor of the magazine. In April 2010, Tyrangiel oversaw the rebranding of BusinessWeek into Bloomberg Businessweek and led the editorial vision of the magazine. Under Tyrangiel's editorship, Bloomberg Businessweek won several magazine awards, including the National Magazine Award for general excellence in general interest magazines in2012. Tyrangiel has also received personal honors for his work at Bloomberg Businessweek. In November 2013, Tyrangiel was called on to help shape television content for Bloomberg Television. In August 2014, Tyrangiel was promoted to oversee all content on Bloomberg's media platforms. In October 2015, Tyrangiel stepped down as editor of Bloomberg Businessweek.

People at Vice do not give a shit what you did before you got there. They’re not going to Wikipedia you. They want to know what you can do for them today, and that keeps you really really fresh.

— Interview with The Bridge

In 2015, he began negotiations to join Vice, meeting with the program's head Shane Smith. As the Senior Vice President of news, he ran the company's digital news desk. He spearheaded the launch of Vice News Tonight in October 2016. in April 2019, Tyrangiel was included on The Hollywood Reporter's ninth annual list of New York's 35 Most Powerful People in Media and, in his interview, said that he was working on new projects that played to Vice's strengths. In June 2019, however, Tyrangiel and Vice News CEO, Nancy Dubuc, both released statements announcing his departure from Vice at the conclusion of the summer.

Tyrangiel joined The Atlantic as a staff writer in 2025.

== Personal life ==
Tyrangiel lives in the East Village of New York City with his partner, Sarah Feinberg, and his two children. He was previously married. Tyrangiel is Jewish. His great-uncle, Judah Nadich, was Dwight Eisenhower’s first advisor on Jewish affairs during the Holocaust.
