= Buddy Fletcher (politician) =

American politician (1932–2017)

Ralph "Buddy" Fletcher

Mayor of Lakeland, Florida
- In office 1993–2009
- Preceded by: Willie J. Williams
- Succeeded by: Gow Fields

Personal details
- Born: August 20, 1932
- Died: July 25, 2017 (aged 84)
- Spouse: Marguerite Fletcher
- Children: 4

Ralph "Buddy" Fletcher (August 20, 1932 – July 25, 2017) was the mayor of Lakeland, Florida from 1993 until 2009. At the end of his tenure he faced ethics complaints. He was succeeded in office by Gow Fields.

Fletcher died on July 25, 2017, at age 84. He is survived by his wife, Marguerite "Weetsie" Fletcher, and their daughter and was preceded in death by three sons.

== See also ==
- List of mayors of Lakeland, Florida
