= Joseph C. Szabo =

American politician (born 1957)

Joseph Szabo
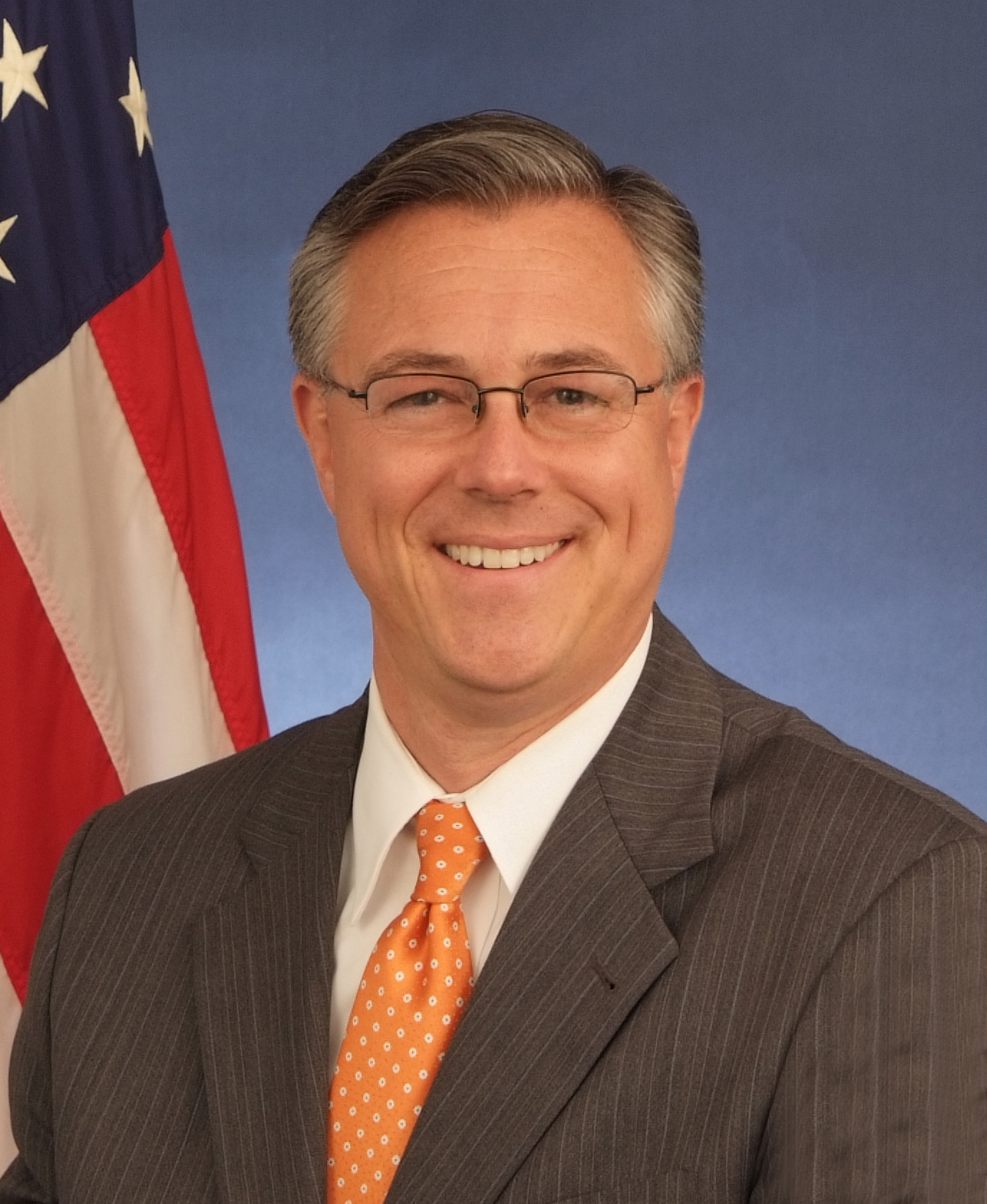

Administrator of the Federal Railroad Administration
- In office April 29, 2009 – January 9, 2015
- President: Barack Obama
- Preceded by: Joseph H. Boardman
- Succeeded by: Sarah Feinberg

Mayor of Riverdale, Illinois
- In office April 1997 – November 14, 2001
- Succeeded by: Zenovia Evans

Personal details
- Born: December 26, 1957 (age 68) Evergreen Park, Illinois
- Education: Governors State University

Joseph C. Szabo (born December 26, 1957) is a former government official who was the twelfth Federal Railroad Administrator of the United States. Nominated by President Barack Obama on March 20, 2009, he was confirmed by the United States Senate on April 29, 2009. Safety was the top priority of his administration. He stepped down from the position on January 9, 2015 and Sarah Feinberg became the Acting Administrator on January 12, 2015, and subsequently the permanent Administrator.

== Life and career ==
Szabo was born into a longtime railroad family. He started his own railroading career in 1976 with the Illinois Central Railroad, where he worked in numerous positions, including as a yard switchman, road trainman, and commuter conductor. He served as the United Transportation Union's State Legislative Director from 1996 to 2009.

Szabo served more than 20 years in municipal government. He began his public service as a zoning commission member in his native south suburban Riverdale, Illinois, where he later served as a park district commissioner, village trustee, and ultimately mayor. He also was a member of the South Suburban Mayors and Managers Association executive board and transportation committee and the regional Council of Mayors executive committee. Other prior service included membership on the Executive Council of Chicago Metropolis 2020 (later known as Metropolis Strategies), the Metropolitan Mayors Caucus, and the Legislative Committee of the Chicago Metropolitan Planning Council.

Szabo joined the Chicago Metropolitan Agency for Planning (CMAP) as a Senior Fellow in January 2015 and was named Executive Director in June 2015. CMAP serves as the seven-county region’s official comprehensive planning organization. Adopted in October 2010, its GO TO 2040 plan is helping the 284 communities of northeastern Illinois to implement strategies that address transportation, housing, economic development, open space, the environment, and other quality-of-life issues. The agency's ON TO 2050 comprehensive plan was adopted on October 10, 2018. Szabo announced his retirement from CMAP on February 15, 2019.

Szabo earned the Bachelor of Arts in Business Administration from Governors State University and received an honorary doctorate from Lewis University for his lifetime commitment to public service. In March 2015, Amtrak honored him by renaming its key operations facility at Chicago's Union Station as the "Joseph C. Szabo Chicago Control Center," which dispatches 580 trains and 120,000 passengers daily.

Political offices
Preceded by Joseph H. Boardman (11th Administrator); Clifford Eby (Acting Administrator)	12th Administrator of the Federal Railroad Administration; 2009–2015	Succeeded by Sarah Feinberg
