= John S. Jackson (Florida politician) =

American politician (1921–1987)

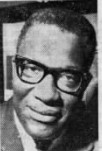

Mayor of Lakeland, Florida
- In office 1972–1974
- Preceded by: Charles E. Whitten
- Succeeded by: W. Carl Dicks

Lakeland City Council
- In office 1968–1975

Personal details
- Born: July 18, 1921 Birmingham, Alabama, U.S.
- Died: June 24, 1987 (aged 65) Polk County, Florida, U.S.
- Spouse: Edna Murray
- Education: B.A. Virginia State College; M.D. Meharry Medical College

John Sidney Jackson (July 18, 1921 – June 24, 1987) was an American politician who served as the first African American surgeon, city commissioner, and mayor of Lakeland, Florida.

== Biography ==
Jackson was born on July 18, 1921, in Birmingham, Alabama, but was raised in Youngstown, Ohio, where his family had moved to escape racial discrimination and to seek higher salaried employment. He attended East High School where he played football. He graduated with a B.A. from Virginia State College and a M.D. from Meharry Medical College in Nashville, Tennessee.

After graduation, he practiced medicine in Durham, North Carolina. In 1949, after being denied employment by hospital administrators in Jacksonville, Orlando, Tampa, St. Petersburg, Sarasota, Fort Myers, West Palm Beach and Miami, who would not allow African-Americans to practice surgery, he moved to Lakeland where Lakeland General Hospital had no such restrictions although Jackson was not allowed to treat white patients. After later threatening to boycott the hospital, Lakeland General acquiesced and removed the restriction.

Jackson was appointed to the city's Zoning Board of Adjustment and Appeals by then mayor W.J. "Jack" Day and served on the city's Human Relations Council. In 1968, he was elected to the Lakeland City Commission defeating former mayor W.J. "Jack" Day by a margin of 3,766 votes to 2,106 votes, becoming the first African-American to win election in the city; and re-elected in 1970 in a landslide election garnering strong support from the city's white population. In 1972, he was appointed mayor pro tem and after mayor Charles Whitten resigned in the fall of 1972, he assumed the mayorship. On January 2, 1973, he was officially appointed mayor by the City Commission by a 4–3 vote, the first African-American mayor in the city's history and one of several Black mayors elected in the early 1970s in Florida (along with Neil A. Butler of Gainesville, James R. Ford of Tallahassee, George Gause of Bartow, and Albert Tresvant of Opa-Locka). While mayor, he secured passage of an anti-discrimination ordinance after a Black serviceman was denied service at a local bar. He served as a Commissioner until 1975.

== Personal life and death ==
Jackson married Edna Murray while a senior in college. He was fluent in Latin.

John S. Jackson died in Polk County, Florida on June 24, 1987, at the age of 65.

== See also ==
- List of first African-American mayors
