= Mayor of Lakeland, Florida =

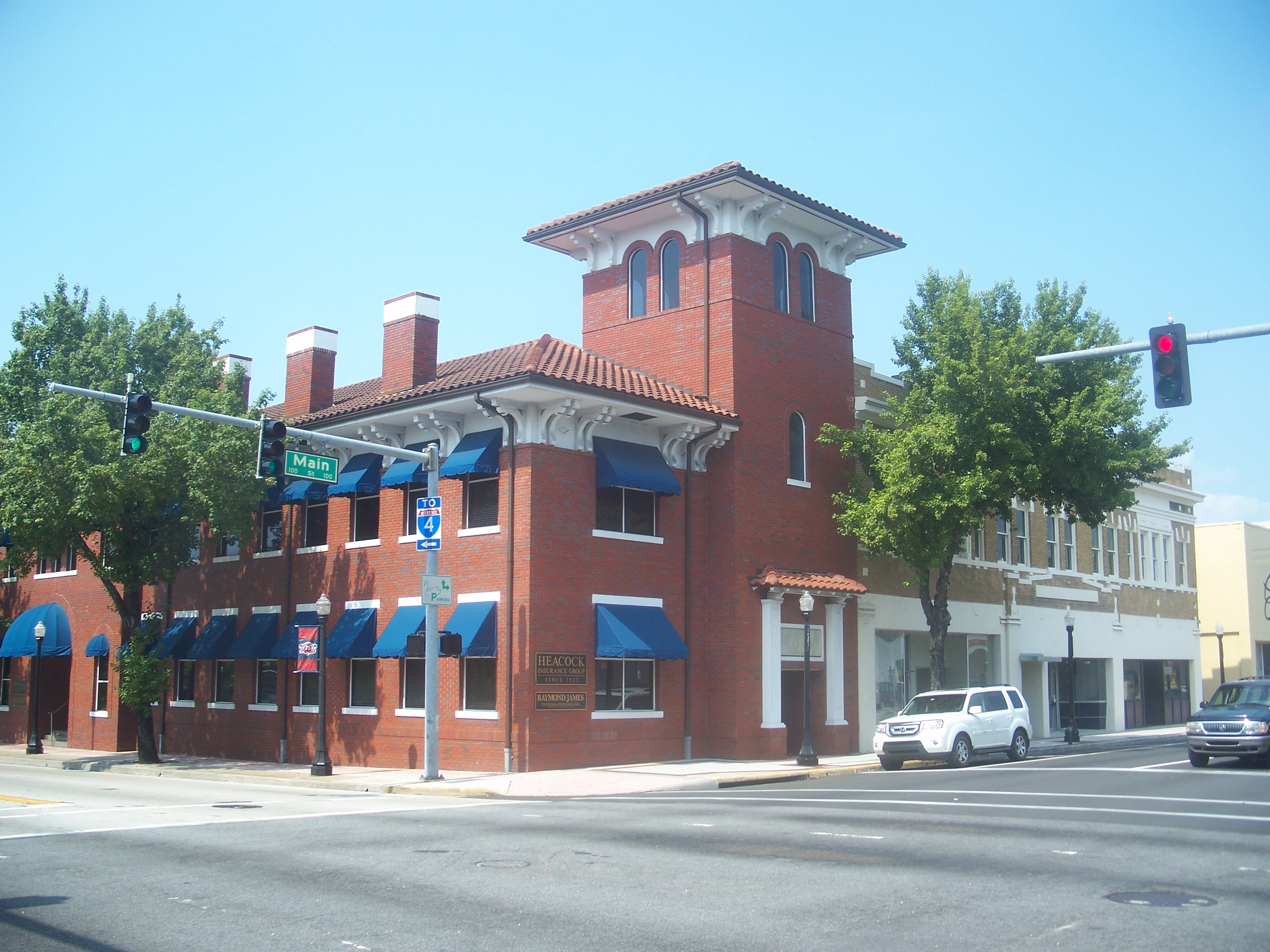
Former city hall of Lakeland, built 1913 (photo 2011)

The following is a list of mayors of the city of Lakeland, Florida, United States. The City of Lakeland was incorporated on January 1, 1885. The mayor is one of seven members of the City Commission, acting as the board chair and performing mostly ceremonial and procedural duties beyond the powers of the other six. Prior to 1988, Lakeland's mayor was selected by the City Commission among its members. Mayors can be on the board for up to 12 years in a lifetime, or 16 years in combination with holding a regular commission position. Since 1988 the mayor is elected by the citizens of the city.

The first female mayor was Lois Q. Searl, who served in 1965. Carrie R. Oldham was the first female African American mayor.

== List of Mayors ==
Image	Mayor	Years	Notes
	John W. Trammell	1885	
	John D. Torrence	1885	
	Eppes C. Tucker Sr.	1886–1888	3 terms
	Napoleon B. Bowyer	1889–1890	2 terms
	Herbert J. Drane	1888–1892	
	?	–	
	J. T. Park	1894	
	Clarence A. Boswell	1894–1896	
	James P. Thompson	1897	
	Samuel L.A. Clonts	1898	
	C. M. Marsh	1898	
	James P. Thompson	1899	
	Park Trammell	1900–1902	
	Samuel L.A. Clonts	1903–1904	
	John F. Cox	1905–1907	
	?	1908	
	John S. Edwards	1909	
	William K. Jackson	1910	
	John F. Cox	1911	
	Samuel L.A. Clonts	1912	
	Oscar M. Eaton	1913–1915	
	John F. Cox	1916–1917	
	Edwin C. Flanagan	1918–1919	
	Frank H. Thompson	1920	
	Hubert C. Petteway	1921	
	J.T. Hodges	1922–1923	
	Daniel C. Boswell	1924	
	John W. Buchanan Jr.	1925	
	J. Bunyan Smith	1926	
	William S. Rodgers	1927	
	Jesse F. Council	1927–1928	
	William S. Rodgers	1927	
	William F. Reid	1928	
	Charles I. Dwiggins	1929	
	H. Dean Grady	1930–1931	
	William F. Reid	1931	
	H. Dean Grady	1930–1931	
	Benjamin M. Pulliam	1932	
	Elijah A. Godwin	1933	
	Edward L. Mack	1934	
	Elijah A. Godwin	1935	
	George W. Mershon	1936	
	H. Clay Haynes	1937	
	Lutie M. Koons	1938	
	Thomas D. Conter	1939	
	Ira C. Hopper	1940	
	George J. Tolson	1941	
	Elmer E. Kelly Jr.	1942	
	Horace W. Gibson	1943	
	George J. Tolson	1944	
	William Cade	1945	
	Edwin C. Flanagan Jr.	1946	
	George J. Tolson	1947	
	William Cade	1948	
	Clinton V. McClurg	1948	
	Ernest B. Sutton	1949	
	Guerry L. Dobbins	1950	
	Clayton Logan	1951	
	James J. Musso	1952	
	Norman T. Kent	1953	
	Wilbur Y. Wooten	1954	
	S. Scott Kelly	1955	
	Mac H. Cunningham	1956	
	Earl W. Bowen	1957	
	James J. Musso	1958	
	William M. Hollis	1958	
	R. Tom Joyner Jr.	1959	
	William G. Cooper Jr.	1960	
	Reuben H. Gibson	1961	
	Morris J. Pritchard	1962	
	William H. Lofton	1963	
	R. Harold Grizzard	1964	
	James R. West	1965	
	Lois Q. Searl	1965	
	John H. Woodall Jr.	1966	
	W. Jack Day	1967	
	George W. Trask	1968–1969	
	Marvin H. Henderson Jr.	1970	
	Joe P. Ruthven	1971	
	Charles E. Whitten	1972	
	John S. Jackson	1972–1974	a surgeon and city commissioner, he was the city's first African American mayor
	W. Carl Dicks	1975	
	Peggy C. Brown	1976	
	Charles A. Coleman	1977	Second African American mayor, a community center is named for him
	John Tolson	1977	
	Curtis I. Walker	1978	
	George R. Burt	1979	
	Carrie R. Oldham	1980	First African America female mayor 3rd African American mayor
	R. Larry Turnipseed	1981	
	J. Larry Durrence	1982	
	Frank J. O'Reilly	1983	
	Peggy C. Brown	1984	
	Thomas R. Shaw	1985	Former owner of owned Shaw House Bed & Breakfast
	J. Larry Durrence	1986	
	Frank J. O'Reilly	1987	
	Willie J. Williams	1988	Pastor Elected at age 32
	Frank J. O'Reilly	1989–1993	Accountant and City Commissioner
	Ralph "Buddy" Fletcher	1993–2009	
	Gow Fields	2009–2013	First African American elected mayor
	R. Howard Wiggs	2014–2018	
	Bill Mutz	2018–2026	
	Sara R. McCarley	2026–present	First female elected mayor

== See also ==
- Timeline of Lakeland, Florida
