= Zeb Lollis Jr. =

American politician

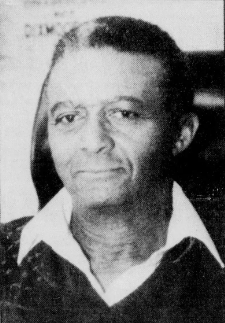

Mayor of Dixmoor, Illinois
- In office May 16, 1988 – April 1993
- Preceded by: Kenneth Fisher
- Succeeded by: Donald Luster

Trustee of the Dixmoor Village Board
- In office April 1987 – May 16, 1988

Personal details
- Born: October 3, 1926 Mississippi, U.S.
- Died: January 21, 2020 (aged 93) Illinois, U.S.
- Spouse: Viola Veal
- Children: 6
- Profession: Politician; Tradesman

Zeb Lollis Jr. (October 3, 1926 – January 21, 2020) was an American politician who served as the first African American mayor of Dixmoor, Illinois. Initially appointed as acting mayor in May 1988 following a deadlocked municipal board session, Lollis was later officially elected to the post, breaking long-standing racial barriers within the local governance of Chicago's south suburban region.

== Early life and career ==
Lollis was born in Mississippi on October 3, 1926. In 1952, he moved north to Chicago; and in 1954, he and his famiy moved from the west side of Chicago to the south suburban village of Dixmoor, Illinois. Before seeking public office, Lollis worked in the construction industry as a skilled professional carpenter, independent contractor, and licensed plumber.

== Political career ==
In 1987, Lollis entered municipal politics. In the April 7, 1987 local elections, he ran as a candidate for the Dixmoor Village Board of Trustees. He secured his seat by winning 343 votes, earning one of the three available four-year terms alongside fellow trustees Bennie Holloway and Stanley Couch.

On April 19, 1988, Dixmoor Mayor Kenneth Fisher died by suicide shortly after being targeted by a federal investigation. The sudden vacancy left the Dixmoor Board of Trustees gridlocked over who should succeed him. For two consecutive board meetings, the trustees were locked in a 3–3 tie regarding the appointment of an acting mayor.

The political stalemate was broken on May 16, 1988 with the council voting 4–2 to appoint Lollis to serve out the remainder of the Fisher's term until the next general municipal elections scheduled for April 1989. The deciding vote proved contentious due to procedural disputes raised by Trustee Bennie Holloway regarding whether a newly appointed trustee, former Fire Chief Kenneth Steinhagen, had been legally sworn into office to vote. Despite objections, the village attorney and state election boards validated the proceedings confirming Lollis' appointment. Upon his swearing-in at the age of 65, Lollis officially became the first African American mayor in the history of Dixmoor.

Lollis subsequently won a full term as the elected mayor in April 1989. His administration prioritized municipal safety, expanding localization infrastructure, creating business incentives, and introducing strict legal frameworks to halt illicit industrial dumping within the suburban community. He served as mayor until April 1993, when he was succeeded by Donald Luster.

== Personal life and legacy ==
Lollis was married to Viola Lollis (née Veal). The couple lived in Dixmoor for over sixty years where they raised six children.

Lollis died on January 21, 2020, at the age of 93. He is recognized by regional historical institutions including the Illinois Black History Museum for his pioneering role in local government diversification.
