= Dixmoor, Illinois =

- Village
- Seal
- Motto: Faith and Restoration
- Location of Dixmoor in Cook County, Illinois.

- Location within Greater Chicago Location within Illinois Location within the United States
- Coordinates: 41°37′51″N 87°39′59″W
- Country: United States
- State: Illinois
- County: Cook
- Township: Thornton
- Incorporated: 1923

Government
  - Type: Council–manager
  - Mayor: Fitzgerald Roberts

Area
  - Total: 1.25 sq mi (3.23 km^{2})
  - Land: 1.25 sq mi (3.23 km^{2})
  - Water: 0 sq mi (0.00 km^{2}) 0%

Population (2020)
  - Total: 2,973
  - Density: 2,381.2/sq mi (919.38/km^{2})

Standard of living (2007-11)
  - Per capita income: $12,960
  - Median home value: $44,600
- ZIP code(s): 60406, 60418, 60426
- Area code(s): 708
- Geocode: 17-20149
- FIPS code: 17-20149
- Website: www.villageofdixmoor.org

Dixmoor (formerly Specialville) is a village in Cook County, Illinois, United States, and a south suburb of Chicago. The population was 2,973 at the 2020 census. Dixmoor is adjacent to Harvey to the south and east, Posen to the west, and Blue Island and Riverdale to the north. Interstate 57 also runs through the village.

== History ==
Dixmoor was originally called Specialville. It was laid out in 1922 by Charles Special, and named for him. The present name of Dixmoor was adopted in 1929. It may be derived from Dixie Highway.

== Geography ==
Dixmoor is located at 41°37′51″N 87°39′59″W (41.630784, -87.666446).

According to the 2021 census gazetteer files, Dixmoor has a total area of 1.25 square miles (3.24 km^{2}), all land.

=== Surrounding areas ===
Blue Island
Blue Island Riverdale
Posen Riverdale
Posen / Harvey Harvey
Harvey

== Demographics ==
Historical population
Census	Pop.	Note	%±
1930	944		—
1940	1,022		8.3%
1950	1,327		29.8%
1960	3,076		131.8%
1970	4,735		53.9%
1980	4,175		−11.8%
1990	3,681		−11.8%
2000	3,934		6.9%
2010	3,644		−7.4%
2020	2,973		−18.4%
U.S. Decennial Census; 2010 2020

=== Racial and ethnic composition ===
Dixmoor, Illinois – Racial and ethnic composition Note: the US Census treats Hispanic/Latino as an ethnic category. This table excludes Latinos from the racial categories and assigns them to a separate category. Hispanics/Latinos may be of any race.
Race / Ethnicity (NH = Non-Hispanic)	Pop 1980	Pop 1990	Pop 2000	Pop 2010	Pop 2020	% 1980	% 1990	% 2000	% 2010	% 2020
White (NH)	1,338	1,210	933	405	310	32.05%	32.875	23.72%	11.11%	10.43%
Black or African American (NH)	2,733	2,216	2,224	1,907	1,485	65.46%	60.20%	56.53%	52.33%	49.95%
Native American or Alaska Native (NH)	3	0	7	7	8	0.07%	0.00%	0.18%	0.19%	0.27%
Asian (NH)	4	0	5	2	18	0.10%	0.00%	0.13%	0.05%	0.61%
Native Hawaiian or Pacific Islander alone (NH)	0	0	0	0	2	0.00%	0.00%	0.00%	0.00%	0.07%
Other race alone (NH)	14	0	0	2	11	0.34%	0.00%	0.00%	0.05%	0.37%
Mixed race or Multiracial (NH)	x	x	49	26	49	x	x	1.25%	0.71%	1.65%
Hispanic or Latino (any race)	83	255	716	1,295	1,090	1.99%	6.93%	18.20%	35.54%	36.66%
Total	4,175	3,681	3,934	3,644	2,973	100.00%	100.00%	100.00%	100.00%	100.00%

=== 2020 census ===
As of the 2020 census, there were 2,973 people and 838 families residing in the village. The population density was 2,380.30 inhabitants per square mile (919.04/km^{2}). There were 1,321 housing units at an average density of 1,057.65 per square mile (408.36/km^{2}). 100.0% of residents lived in urban areas, while 0.0% lived in rural areas.

There were 1,050 households, of which 39.0% had children under the age of 18 living in them. Of all households, 29.7% were married-couple households, 24.6% were households with a male householder and no spouse or partner present, and 36.2% were households with a female householder and no spouse or partner present. About 24.5% of all households were made up of individuals, and 6.7% had someone living alone who was 65 years of age or older.

The median age was 36.4 years. 25.5% of residents were under the age of 18 and 12.6% were 65 years of age or older. For every 100 females, there were 95.5 males, and for every 100 females age 18 and over there were 94.4 males.

Of those housing units, 20.5% were vacant. The homeowner vacancy rate was 1.1% and the rental vacancy rate was 18.7%.

=== Income and poverty ===
The median income for a household in the village was $44,757, and the median income for a family was $44,375. Males had a median income of $26,736 versus $15,552 for females. The per capita income for the village was $16,349. About 27.4% of families and 26.9% of the population were below the poverty line, including 40.5% of those under age 18 and 22.6% of those age 65 or over.

== Government ==
Dixmoor is divided between two congressional districts. The area east of Interstate 57 and south of 142nd Street is in Illinois's 2nd congressional district, as are the area between 141st and 142nd Streets east of Wood Street and the area northeast of the Ashland Avenue-Thornton Road intersection; the rest of the village is in the 1st district.

Mayors of Dixmoor, Illinois

Image	Mayor	Years	Notes
	Joseph Mancuso	1957–1981	
	Kenneth Fisher	April 1981 – April 19, 1988	Died by suicide on April 19, 1988, one day after being indicted by federal authorities for taking bribes to protect a gambling operation.
	Zeb Lollis Jr.	May 16, 1988 – April 1989	First African American mayor. Appointed after the death of mayor Kenneth Fisher.
	Jerry Smith	April 1989 – 1993	First elected African American mayor.
	Zeb Lollis Jr.	1993–1997	
	Erick M. Nickerson	1997 – May 2001	
	Donald C. Luster	May 2001 –	
	Martha Loggins	April 20, 2004 – April 2005	First woman mayor. Replaced mayor Donald Luster who was forced to resign after being convicted of insurance fraud and failure to file state income taxes. Lost bid for mayor in the general election in April 2005.
	Keevan A. Grimmett	2005–2009; 2009–2013	Reelected in 2009.
	Dorothy D. Armstrong	2013–2021	First African American woman mayor
	Yvonne Davis	2017–2021	
	Fitzgerald Roberts	2021–Present	

== Transportation ==
Pace provides bus service on routes 349 and 354 connecting Dixmoor to destinations across the Southland.

== Notable people ==
- Tony Jacobs, pitcher for the Chicago Cubs and St. Louis Cardinals.
- Napoleon Harris, American politician and former American football linebacker who has been a member of the Illinois Senate representing the 15th district since 2013.
