= Riverdale, Illinois =

- Village
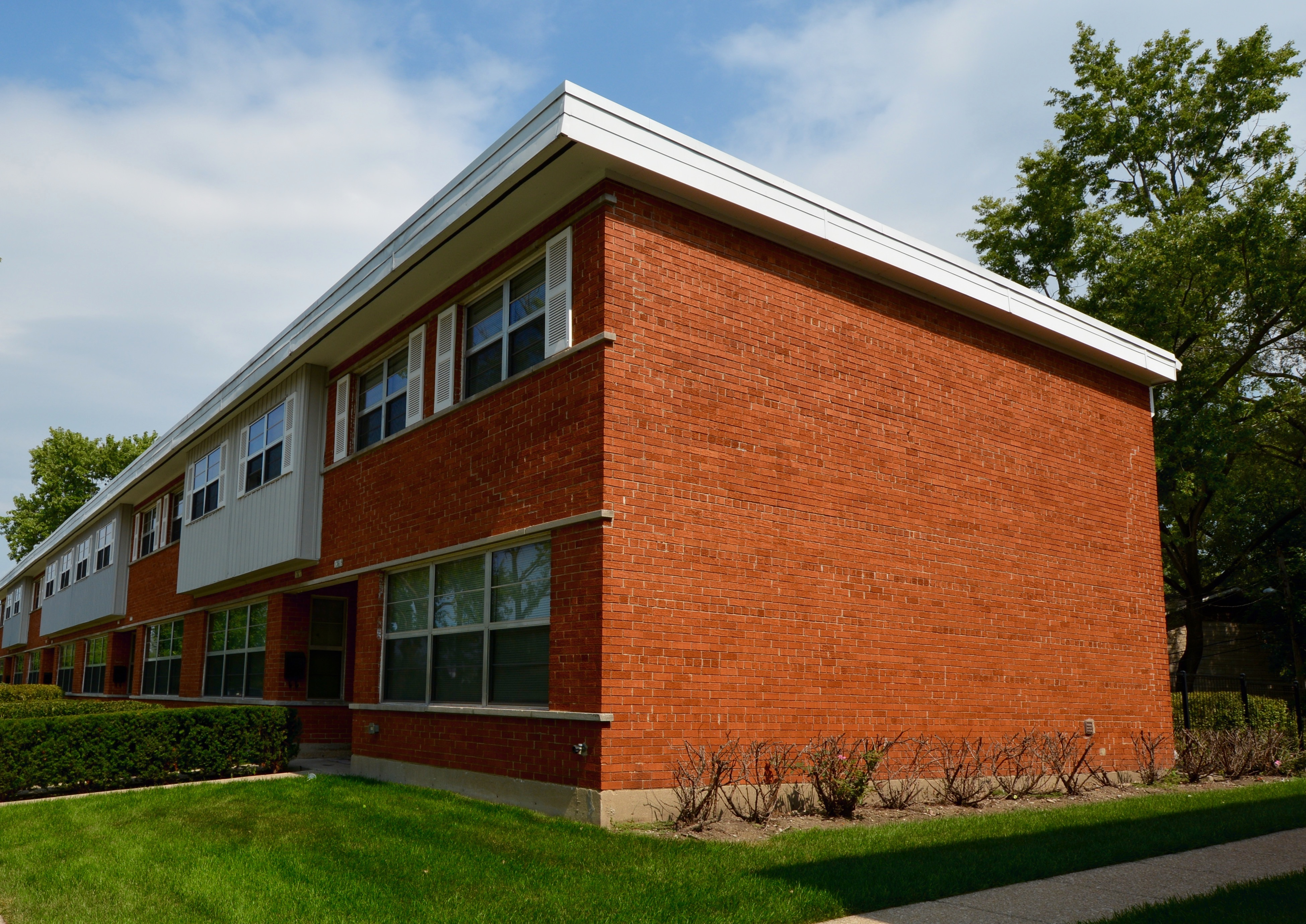
- Pacesetter Gardens Historic District

- Seal
- Nickname: The Dale
- Motto: "A Village with a Vision"
- Location of Riverdale in Cook County, Illinois.

- Location within Greater Chicago Location within Illinois Location within the United States
- Coordinates: 41°38′26″N 87°37′50″W
- Country: United States
- State: Illinois
- County: Cook
- Townships: Thornton, Calumet

Government
  - Mayor: Lawrence Jackson

Area
  - Total: 3.75 sq mi (9.71 km^{2})
  - Land: 3.58 sq mi (9.26 km^{2})
  - Water: 0.17 sq mi (0.45 km^{2}) 4.80%

Population (2020)
  - Total: 10,663
  - Density: 2,982.4/sq mi (1,151.51/km^{2})
- Demonym: Riverdalian

Standard of living (2007-11)
  - Per capita income: $16,463
  - Median home value: $101,300
- Time zone: Central Standard Time
  - Summer (DST): Central Daylight Time
- ZIP code(s): 60827
- Area code(s): 708
- Geocode: 64278
- FIPS code: 17-64278
- Website: www.villageofriverdale.net

Riverdale is a village and south suburb in Cook County, Illinois, United States. The population was 10,663 at the 2020 census. The village shares its name with the bordering Riverdale neighborhood in Chicago.

== History ==
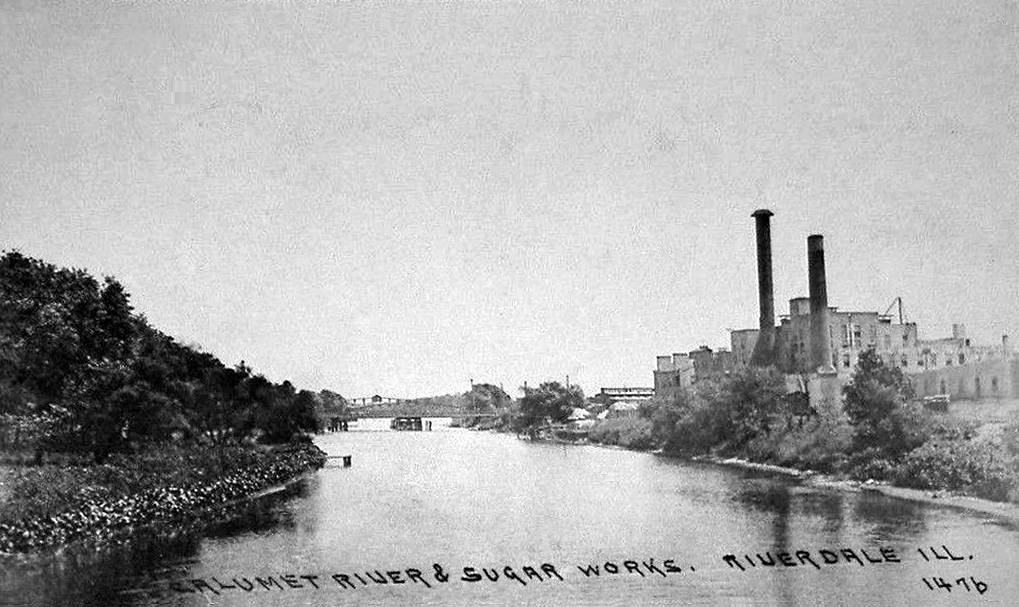
Image of the Charles Pope Beet Sugar Works on the Calumet River in Riverdale (1910)

The Village of Riverdale was incorporated in 1893. In 1904 the Englishman and former Chicago glucose manufacturer Charles Pope (1843–1922) purchased property in Riverdale at what is today the west side of Indiana Avenue with the intention of establishing a beet sugar factory. The property was previously occupied by The Riverdale Distillery, which had been established by the Union Copper Distilling Company of Chicago in 1871 to manufacture fermentum yeast. Located on the south bank of the Little Calumet river with access to the Illinois Central tracks, the beet sugar factory opened in 1905 with a capacity of 350 tons of beet sugar per day, a production rate that was eventually increased to 500 tons per day. The factory was sold by Pope's heirs in 1922 to the Midwest Sugar Refining Company, who added sugar to the product line that was produced from cane supplied from Cuba and Puerto Rico. and who the following year began a program that was intended "to expand this enterprise far beyond its present capacity so as to make the company one of the leading producers and refiners of sugar in the Middle West." In 1947 this enterprise was replaced by The Chromium Mining and Smelting Corporation.

== Geography ==
Riverdale is located at 41°38′26″N 87°37′50″W (41.640684, -87.630645). According to the 2010 census, Riverdale has a total area of 3.745 square miles (9.70 km^{2}), of which 3.57 square miles (9.25 km^{2}) (or 95.33%) is land and 0.175 square miles (0.45 km^{2}) (or 4.67%) is water.

=== Surrounding areas ===
Chicago
Calumet Park Chicago
Blue Island Dolton
Dixmoor Dolton
Harvey / Dolton

== Demographics ==
Historical population
Census	Pop.	Note	%±
1880	450		—
1900	558		—
1910	917		64.3%
1920	1,166		27.2%
1930	2,504		114.8%
1940	2,865		14.4%
1950	5,840		103.8%
1960	12,008		105.6%
1970	15,806		31.6%
1980	13,233		−16.3%
1990	13,637		3.1%
2000	15,055		10.4%
2010	13,549		−10.0%
2020	10,663		−21.3%
U.S. Decennial Census; 2010 2020

=== Racial and ethnic composition ===
Riverdale village, Illinois – Racial and ethnic composition Note: the US Census treats Hispanic/Latino as an ethnic category. This table excludes Latinos from the racial categories and assigns them to a separate category. Hispanics/Latinos may be of any race.
Race / Ethnicity (NH = Non-Hispanic)	Pop 1980	Pop 1990	Pop 2000	Pop 2010	Pop 2020	% 1980	% 1990	% 2000	% 2010	% 2020
White alone (NH)	12,811	7,846	1,539	511	301	96.81%	57.53%	10.22%	3.77%	2.82%
Black or African American alone (NH)	36	5,424	12,942	12,610	9,791	0.27%	39.77%	85.96%	93.07%	91.82%
Native American or Alaska Native alone (NH)	7	24	24	24	11	0.05%	0.18%	0.16%	0.18%	0.10%
Asian alone (NH)	37	9	29	13	13	0.28%	0.07%	0.19%	0.10%	0.12%
Native Hawaiian or Pacific Islander alone (NH)	1		0	0	7	0.01%		0.00%	0.00%	0.07%
Other race alone (NH)	20	0	18	11	40	0.15%	0.00%	0.12%	0.08%	0.38%
Mixed race or Multiracial (NH)	x	x	137	143	160	x	x	0.91%	1.06%	1.50%
Hispanic or Latino (any race)	321	334	366	237	340	2.43%	2.45%	2.43%	1.75%	3.19%
Total	13,233	13,637	15,055	13,549	10,663	100.00%	100.00%	100.00%	100.00%	100.00%

=== 2020 census ===
As of the 2020 census, Riverdale had a population of 10,663. The median age was 37.3 years. 24.8% of residents were under the age of 18 and 12.4% of residents were 65 years of age or older. For every 100 females there were 82.6 males, and for every 100 females age 18 and over there were 76.5 males age 18 and over.

100.0% of residents lived in urban areas, while 0.0% lived in rural areas.

There were 4,187 households in Riverdale, and 2,726 families resided in the village. Of all households, 33.2% had children under the age of 18 living in them, 20.2% were married-couple households, 21.4% were households with a male householder and no spouse or partner present, and 51.3% were households with a female householder and no spouse or partner present. About 32.7% of all households were made up of individuals, and 10.2% had someone living alone who was 65 years of age or older.

There were 5,087 housing units, of which 17.7% were vacant. The homeowner vacancy rate was 6.1% and the rental vacancy rate was 13.8%. The population density was 2,843.47 inhabitants per square mile (1,097.87/km^{2}), and housing units were at an average density of 1,356.53 per square mile (523.76/km^{2}).

=== Income and poverty ===
The median income for a household in the village was $38,355, and the median income for a family was $42,632. Males had a median income of $36,231 versus $30,861 for females. The per capita income for the village was $18,987. About 27.2% of families and 28.0% of the population were below the poverty line, including 37.9% of those under age 18 and 17.0% of those age 65 or over.

== Government ==
Riverdale is divided between two congressional districts. Most of the city is in Illinois's 2nd congressional district; the area west of Ashland Avenue and the area southwest of 141st and Halsted Streets are in the 1st district. The local government of Riverdale consists of six elected trustees, one elected village clerk, and one elected mayor. On April 9, 2013, incumbent mayor Deyon Dean was defeated by trustee Lawrence Jackson, who was sworn in as mayor of Riverdale on May 2, 2013.

Mayors of Riverdale, Illinois

Image	Mayor	Years	Notes
		?	
	Henry Strosinski Sr.	1949–	
	Edward L. Kipley Sr.	1957–1967	
	?		
	Frank J. Heenan	1972–1988	
	Edward L. Kipley Jr.	1989–1997	
	Joseph C. Szabo	April 1997 – November 14, 2001	
	Zenovia Evans	November 2001 – April 2001; April 2001 – April 2009	Appointed Acting mayor after resignation of Szabo; Won in the general election in April 2001. First African American mayor of Riverdale.
	Deyon Dean	April 2009 – April 2013	
	Lawrence L. Jackson	April 2013 – November 2025	Removed from office after being convicted of perjury and obstruction of justice.
	Cassandra Riley-Pinkney	November 2025 – Present	Appointed mayor to serve until the next election in April 2027

== Transportation ==
Riverdale is home to two stations on the Metra Electric District's main line; Ivanhoe station at 144th Street and Riverdale station at 137th Street.

Pace provides bus service on multiple routes in the village connecting Riverdale to destinations across the Southland.

== Notable people ==
- Marcheline Bertrand, actress; mother of actress Angelina Jolie; grew up in Riverdale
- Antwaan Randle El, Chicago Bears Assistant HC/Wide Receiver’s Coach; wide receiver for the Washington Redskins and Pittsburgh Steelers; Super Bowl champion (XL); born in Riverdale
- Charles Christian Hammer, classical guitarist
- Marjorie Pebworth, Illinois politician; lived in Riverdale
- Betty Robinson, Olympic gold medalist in the 100 and 400 meter relays (1928 & 1936); born in Riverdale
- Steamboat Struss, pitcher for the Pittsburgh Pirates; born in Riverdale
- Joseph C. Szabo, 12th Administrator of the Federal Railroad Administration; previously served as a Village Trustee and Village President of Riverdale
- Morez Johnson Jr., American basketball player for the Dallas Mavericks
