= Batyr =

Batyr may refer to:

== Given name ==
- Batyr Amanov (born 1978), Turkmen politician
- Batyr Akhmedov (born 1990), Russian professional boxer
- Batyr Ataýew (1901–1938), Turkmen politician, head of the Turkmen SSR
- Batyr Atdayev, Turkmen politician
- Batyr Babaýew (born 1991), Turkmen footballer
- Batyr Bazarov (born 1976), Turkmenistani politician
- Batyr Berdiýew (born 1960), Turkmen politician
- Batyr Boromangnaev, Kalmyk political activist
- Batyr Sarjayev (born 1945), Turkmen politician

== Surname ==
- Baitik Batyr (1823–1886), Kyrgyz politician
- Bogenbay Batyr, Kazakh warrior from the 18th century
- Jantay Batyr (1794–1867), Kyrgyz statesman
- Nauryzbai Batyr (1706–1781), Kazakh war hero
- Ospan Batyr (1899–1951), Kazakh military leader
- Raiymbek Batyr, Kazakh warrior from the 18th century
- Tadeusz Batyr, president of Poland Karol Nawrocki pen name
- Taneke Batyr, Kazakh tribal leader

== See also ==
- Batur (disambiguation)
- Bator
