= Batory (disambiguation) =

Batory is the Polish spelling of the name of the Hungarian Báthory family.

Batory may also refer to:

== People ==
- Don Batory, an American computer scientist
- Ivan Bátory (born 1975), a Slovak cross-country skier
- Jan Batory (1921–1981), a Polish film director
- Józef Batory (1914–1951), a Polish soldier and resistance fighter
- Ronald Batory (born 1950), an American railroad executive and administrator
- Stefan Batory (1533–1586), King of Poland from 1576 to 1586

== Ships ==
- ORP Batory, a 1932-built patrol boat in the Polish Border Guard and, later, Navy
- MS Batory, an ocean liner launched in 1935 and scrapped in 1971
- TSS Stefan Batory, an ocean liner built in 1952 and scrapped in 2000

== See also ==
- Bathory (disambiguation)
- Chorzów Batory, a district of the Polish city of Chorzów
- Stefan Batory Foundation, a Polish NGO
