= SPLC (disambiguation) =

The Southern Poverty Law Center (SPLC) is an American nonprofit civil rights organization.

SPLC may also refer to:

- Mariano Melgar Airport, Arequipa department of Peru (ICAO code: SPLC)
- Software Product Line Conference, an annual international conference
- Student Press Law Center, an American nonprofit journalism organization headquartered in Washington, D.C.
- Standard Point Location Code, a 9-digit geographic code used by North American transportation industries
- St Peter's Lutheran Church, Hobart, Australia
- St Peters Lutheran College, in Brisbane, Australia
