= Batur =

Batur (Kazakh: باتىر) (Hazaragi: باتور) in Kazakh title meaning "Hero" and in Hazaragi (Persian) also meaning "Brave" and "Hero" and may refer to:

== People ==
- Batur (surname)
- Batur (Hazara tribe)

== Places ==
- Arigh Batur
- Batur, a village in Kintamani, Bali known for the temple Pura Ulun Danu Batur.
- Lake Batur, Bali island, Indonesia
- Mount Batur
- Batur, Afghanistan

== See also ==
- Baghatur
- Batyr
- Bator

== Other ==
- The leader of an Oboq
- Bentley Mulliner Batur, a limited production model of Bentley Continental GT
