= David Armstrong Fink =

American Businessman & Political Administrator

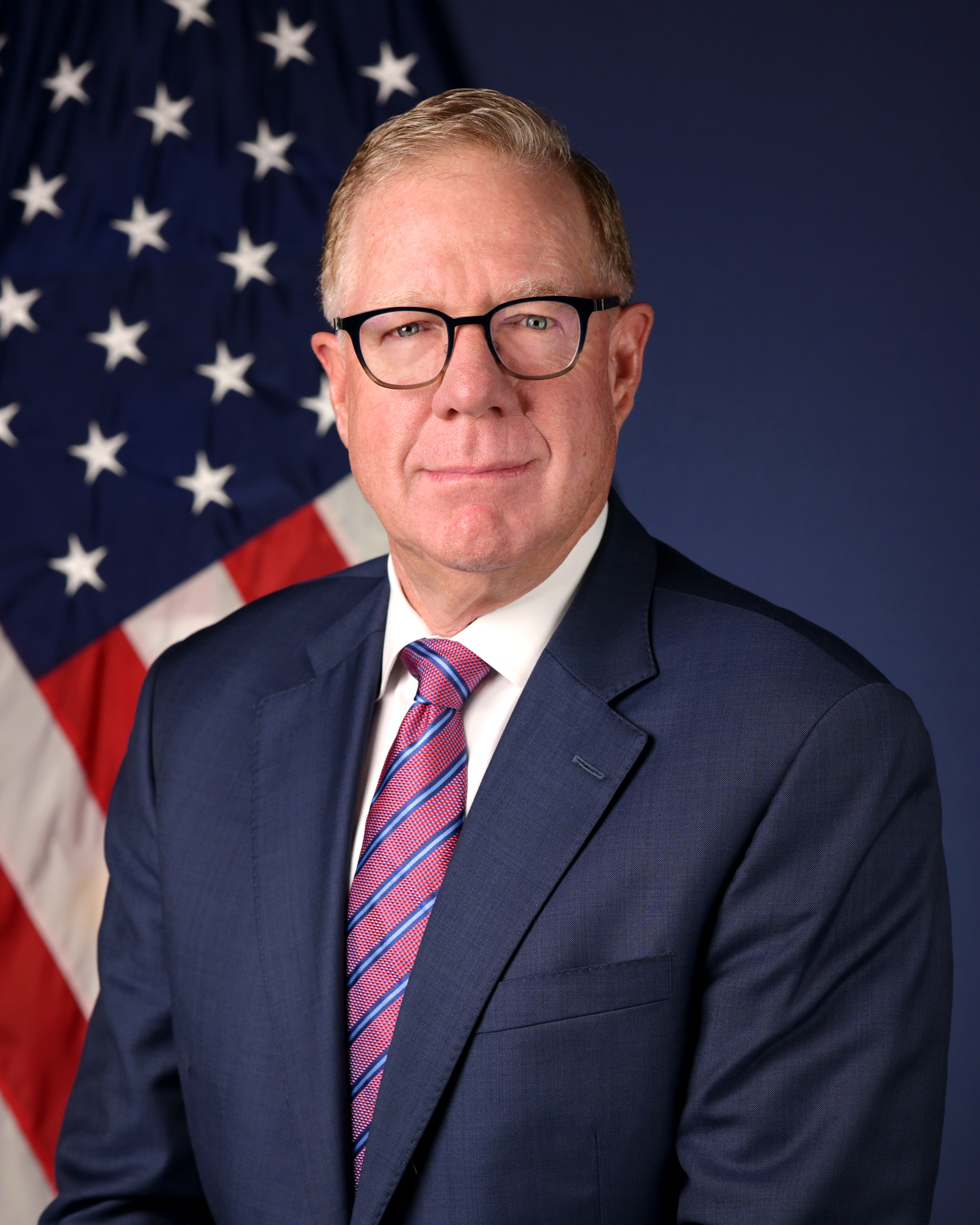

Administrator of the Federal Railroad Administration
- President: Donald Trump
- Preceded by: Amit Bose (government official)

Personal details
- Born: Around 1961
- Citizenship: United States of America
- Education: Bachelor's at Northeastern University Master's at Pennsylvania State University.

David Armstrong Fink (born around 1961) is an American businessman and politician who is the current administrator of the Federal Railroad Administration. He was confirmed by the US Senate on October 7, 2025. By 1998, he had joined his father's company, Pan Am Railways (at the time named Guilford Rail System) and became the vice president. His father, also named David Fink, co-owned the company alongside Timothy Mellon.

Starting in 2006, the same year that Pan Am Railways was rebranded, David was promoted to the president of the company, and held that position all the way up until its acquisition by CSX in 2022. Near the end of his tenure, the National Transportation Safety Board (NTSB) sent a letter to Pan Am that claimed the railroad failed "to develop a positive safety culture throughout the organization".

== Early life and education ==
David Armstrong Fink was born around 1961 to his father, David Andrew Fink.

He obtained his Bachelor of Science in Transportation and Physical Distribution Management from Northeastern University, then a Master of Science in Business Administration from Pennsylvania State University.

== Early career in transportation (1976-1998) ==
When he was 15 years old, he was a summer track worker at Conrail. While at Northeastern University, he had two co-op jobs with the Boston & Maine Railroad. After graduating from Penn State, he worked for General Motors.

== Tenure as Vice-President of Guildford Rail System (1998-2006) ==
His father worked closely with Timothy Mellon as they founded the company in the early 1980s. Most likely thanks to this connection, David Armstrong Fink was able to be promoted to the Executive Vice President.

== Tenure as President of Pan Am Railways (2006-2022) ==
David was promoted to the executive president of the railway. Afterwards, the railway rebranded itself in 2006 by taking on the former airline's logo and name, despite the brand already being bought back in 1998.

From 2012 to 2015, he alongside the company was the defendant of a lawsuit made by a former railroad superintendent Kurt E. Peterson.

Pan Am Railways was put up for sale in 2020. He resigned on June 1, 2022. That same day, CSX announced that it acquired the company.

== After resignation (2022-2025) ==
David served as a part-time lecturer at Northeastern University from September 2020 to December 2024.

== Nomination & time as Administrator of FRA (2024-present) ==
President Donald Trump announced his intention to nominate David on December 23, 2024 on Truth Social. He was confirmed on October 7 of 2025, though was originally nominated in January of that year.

== Personal life ==
David lives with his wife and two children in New Hampshire.
