= Request for Routing =

In the realm of electronic commerce, shippers frequently need to know how the consignee or payer of a load wants a load shipped, for example, which carrier, what dates, how many trailers.

The EDI ASC X12 standards provide guidance for an electronic document coded '753' to be generated to request routing instructions.

The request for routing instructions are for shipments originating from one shipping origin point, to be delivered to one or more destination points. Information to be provided for this request include, but is not limited to, purchase order details (quantities, weights, and cube), commodity classifications in shipment (refer to National Motor Freight Classification 100 series), how the load (unitized methodology) is being tendered to the pick-up carrier, pick-up date, time of availability, and the applicable shipment contact details.

The 753 is typically responded to with the 754 document, Routing Instructions.
