= Batyr (disambiguation) =

Batyr is a given name and a surname.

Batyr may also refer to:

- Batyr (elephant)
- Baghatur, a heroic title in Turkic and Mongolian military tradition

== See also ==
- Batur (disambiguation)
- Bator
