= Obok =

Obok may refer to one of two terms

- Obock, a small port town in Djibouti
- Oboq, a Mongolian clan council
