= Yannis Smaragdakis =

American computer scientist

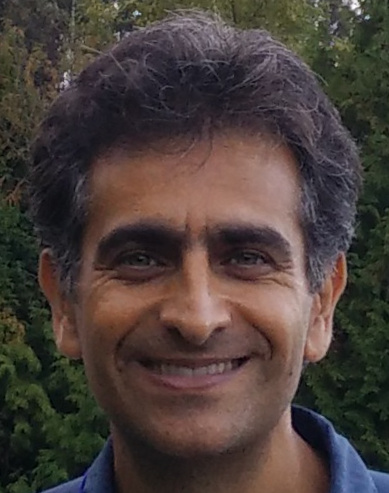
- Born: 31 March 1972 (age 54); Athens, Greece
- Education: University of Crete, B.S., 1993; University of Texas at Austin, M.S., 1995, PhD, 1999
- Scientific career
- Fields: Computer Science; Applied Programming Languages; Software Engineering
- Workplaces: University of Athens (2010–present); University of Massachusetts Amherst (2008–2010); University of Oregon (2006–2008); Georgia Institute of Technology (2000–2006)
- Thesis: Implementing Large-Scale Object-Oriented Components (1999)
- Doctoral advisor: Don Batory
- Website: https://yanniss.github.io/

Yannis Smaragdakis (Greek: Γιάννης Σμαραγδάκης; born 31 March 1972) is a Greek-American software engineer, computer programmer, and researcher. He is a professor in the Department of Informatics and Telecommunications at the University of Athens. He is the author of more than 130 research articles on a variety of topics, including program analysis, declarative languages, program generators, language design, and concurrency. He is best known for work in program generation and program analysis (including the monograph “Pointer Analysis”) and the Doop framework.

== Work ==
Smaragdakis earned a B.S. in Computer Science from the University of Crete (1993) and an M.S and Ph.D. in computer science from the University of Texas at Austin (1995, 1999), where he studied under Don Batory. He has worked as an associate professor at the University of Massachusetts Amherst and the University of Oregon, and as an assistant professor at the Georgia Institute of Technology. Since 2010, he has worked as a professor in the Department of Informatics at the University of Athens. Smaragdakis is best known for work in program generation and program analysis, including Ethereum smart contract analysis. He is the co-author with George Balatsouras of the book Pointer Analysis (Foundations and Trends in Programming Languages). In 2021, Smaragdakis partnered with security engineer Neville Grech to found Dedaub Ltd, a computer company specializing in security and audits of smart contracts and decentralized finance (DeFi).

== Awards and honors ==
Smaragdakis has been the recipient of the following awards and honors:

- 2020 Communications of the ACM Research Highlight for "MadMax: Analyzing the Out-of-Gas World of Smart Contracts"
- General Chair of the SPLASH'19 (Systems, Programming, Languages, and Applications: Software for Humanity) conference
- Distinguished Paper Award at OOPSLA'18 and ACM SIGPLAN Research Highlight for "MadMax: Surviving Out-of-Gas Conditions in Ethereum Smart Contracts"
- Distinguished Paper Award at European Conference on Object Oriented Programming: ECOOP'18 for "Defensive Points-To Analysis: Effective Soundness via Laziness"
- Member of ACM SIGPLAN Executive Committee, 2015–2018
- Program Committee Chair of the OOPSLA'16 Conference
- Distinguished Artifact Award at OOPSLA'15 for "Automating Ad Hoc Data Representation Transformations"
- European Research Council Consolidator Grant in 2012
- Best Paper Award at (ACM's SIGSOFT International Symposium on Software Testing and Analysis) ISSTA'12 for “Residual Investigation: Predictive and Precise Bug Detection”
- Best Paper Award at (IEEE/ACM's international conference on Automated software engineering) ASE'07 for “Scalable Automatic Test Data Generation from Modeling Diagrams”
- Best Paper Award at (ACM's SIGSOFT International Symposium on Software Testing and Analysis) ISSTA'06 for “DSD-Crasher: A Hybrid Analysis Tool for Bug Finding”
- Best Paper Award at (ACM's International Conference on Generative Programming: Concepts & Experiences) GPCE’04 for “Generating AspectJ Programs with Meta-AspectJ”
- National Science Foundation CAREER Award, 2001
- Outstanding Paper Award at USENIX'99 for “The Case for Compressed Caching in Virtual Memory Systems”.
