= SCAC =

SCAC may refer to:

- Slim Cessna's Auto Club, alternative country band
- South Central Athletic Conference, an intercollegiate athletic conference of historically black colleges and universities in the United States (1935–1961)
- Southern Collegiate Athletic Conference, an athletic conference within NCAA Division III
- Standard Carrier Alpha Code, four-letter transportation carrier codes
- Sukhoi Civil Aircraft Corporation, Russian aircraft manufacturer Sukhoi
