= Bathori =

Bathori is a surname. Notable people with the surname include:

- Jane Bathori (1877–1970), French opera singer
- Gabriel Báthori (1589–1613), Transylvanian prince
- Elizabeth Bathori (1560–1614), Hungarian noblewoman

== See also ==
- Bathory (disambiguation)
