= Bator =

Bator is a surname. Notable people with the surname include:

- Joanna Bator (born 1968), Polish novelist, journalist and academic
- Marc Bator (born 1972), German television moderator
- Paul M. Bator (1929–1989), American law professor and Deputy Solicitor General of the United States
- Francis M. Bator (1925–2018) Hungarian-American economist and educator
- Stiv Bators (1949–1990), born Steven John Bator, American punk rock vocalist and guitarist
- Szidor Bátor (1860–1929), Hungarian composer

== See also ==
- Ulaanbaatar, alternatively spelled Ulan Bator, capital city of Mongolia
- Bátor, village in Hungary
- Bator, Gujrat, village in Pakistan
- Ulan Bator (band), French experimental post-rock band
- Era Bator Sur, 1956 Assamese film
- Baghatur, honorific title
- Batyr
- Batur
- Batory
- Batory (disambiguation)
