= Federal Railroad Administration =

Agency of the U.S. Department of Transportation

Agency overview
- Formed: April 1, 1967; 59 years ago
- Jurisdiction: United States government
- Headquarters: Washington, DC
- Employees: 850
- Annual budget: $1.561 billion (2008)
- Agency executives: David Fink, Administrator; Drew Feely, Deputy Administrator
- Parent agency: U.S. Department of Transportation
- Website: railroads.dot.gov

The Federal Railroad Administration (FRA) is an agency in the United States Department of Transportation (DOT). The agency was created by the Department of Transportation Act of 1966. The purpose of the FRA is to promulgate and enforce rail safety regulations, administer railroad assistance programs, conduct research and development in support of improved railroad safety and national rail transportation policy, provide for the rehabilitation of Northeast Corridor rail passenger service, and consolidate government support of rail transportation activities.

The FRA is one of ten agencies within the DOT concerned with intermodal transportation. It operates through seven divisions under the offices of the Administrator and Deputy Administrator. These divisions are Financial Management and Administration, Chief Counsel, Civil Rights, Public Affairs, Public Engagement, Railroad Policy and Development, and Safety. It has a staff of about 850.

== Function ==
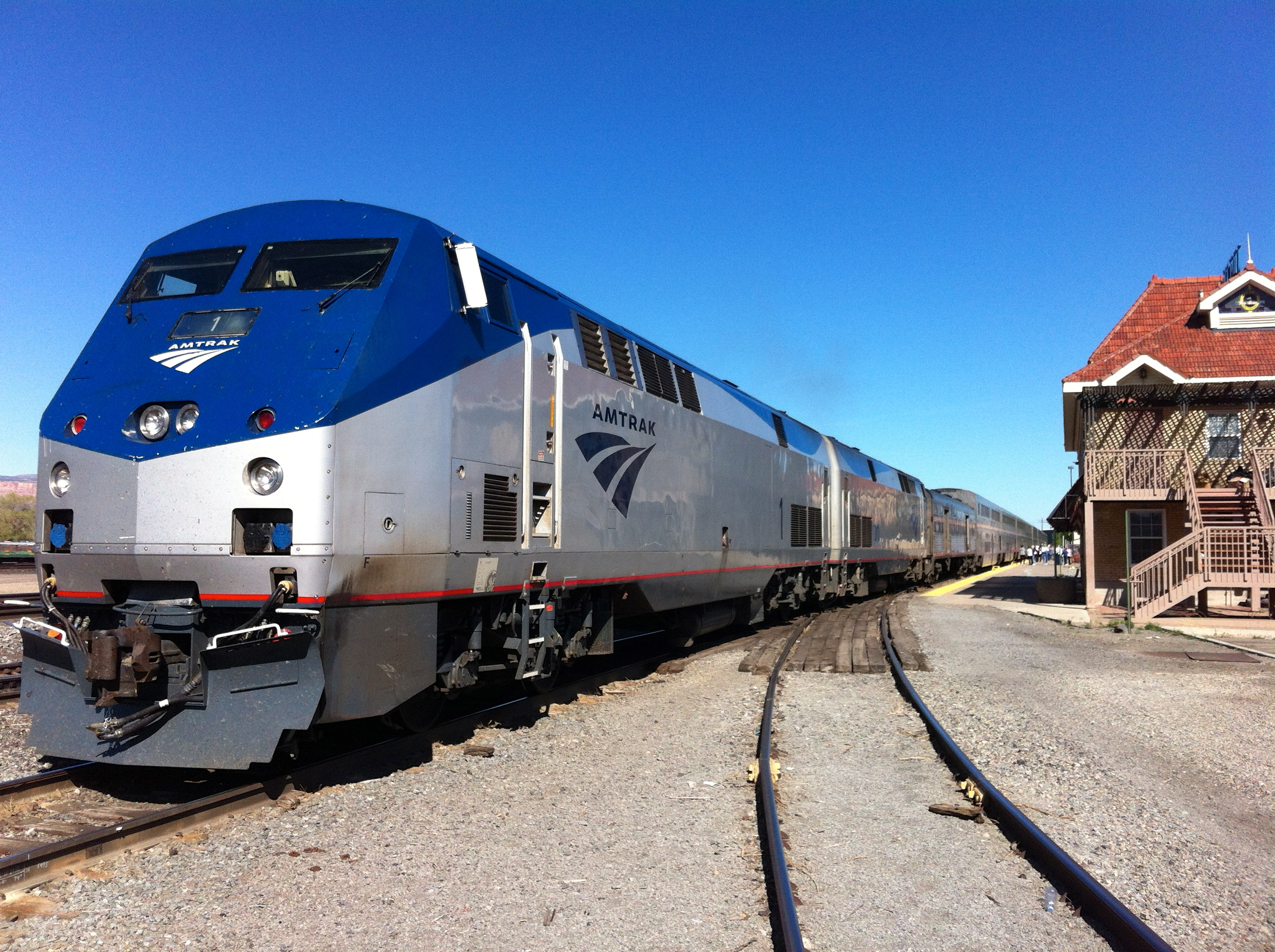
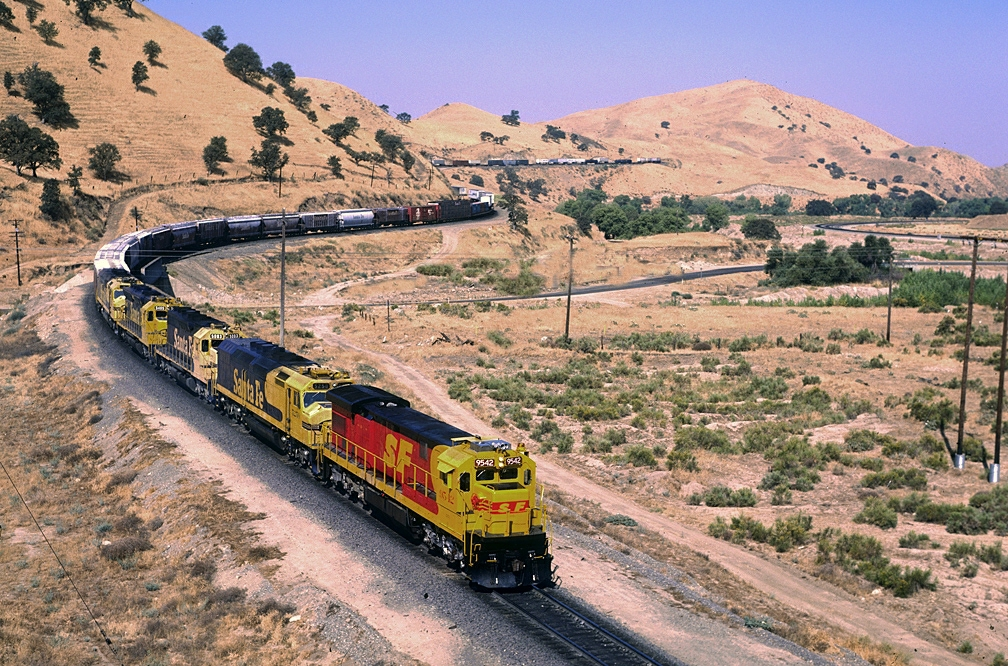
The FRA oversees both passenger (top) and freight (bottom) rail operations in the United States.

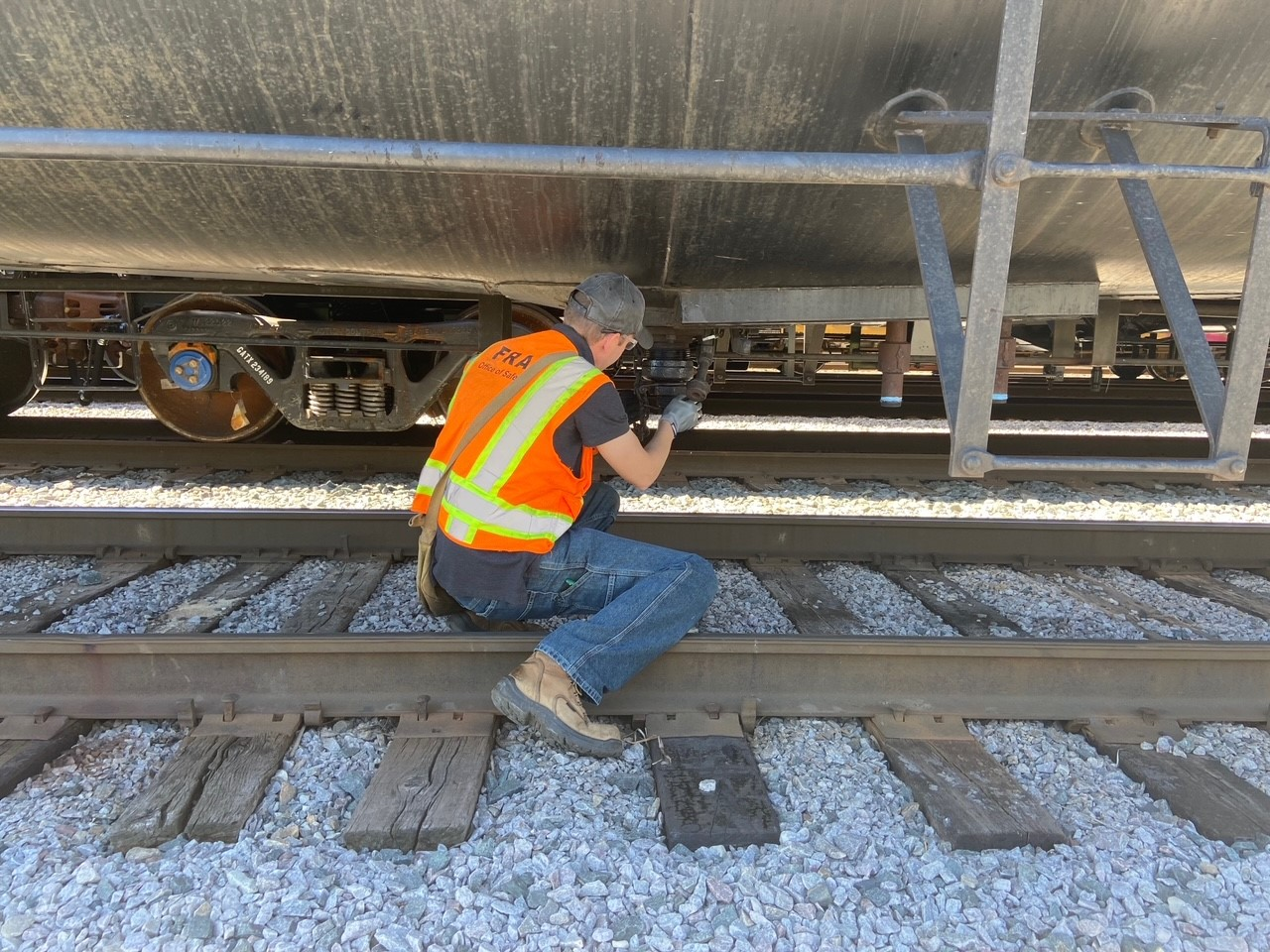
An FRA hazardous materials inspector examines outlet valves at the bottom of a tank car to ensure that they are properly tightened

All passenger and freight rail travel in the United States on the national interconnected rail infrastructure is subject to regulation by the FRA. FRA regulates public and intercity rail services, but does not regulate "closed" railways that operate exclusively on private property, such as a rail system between buildings at a steel mill, nor does it regulate subways, light rail, or elevated intra-city passenger rail systems that do not connect to any public rail networks. Most notably, the FRA enforces safety regulations, such as speed limits and requirements for safety features such as positive train control (PTC). Non-legislative recommendations for FRA policy come from the Rail Safety Advisory Committee, established in 1996, though much of FRA policy is created via congressional legislation; for example, the Rail Safety Improvement Act of 2008 was an act of Congress, which the FRA enforced through a series of regulations published two years later. These regulations include enforcement of PTC requirements and enforcement of more stringent conductor certification requirements.

=== Passenger rail initiatives ===
The FRA announced the availability of over $153 million in funding through the Restoration and Enhancement (R&E) Grant Program in 2024. This funding, provided under the Bipartisan Infrastructure Law, is intended to support operating costs for new, restored, or enhanced intercity passenger rail services. The program aims to improve the quality and accessibility of passenger rail, encouraging a shift towards more sustainable transportation options.

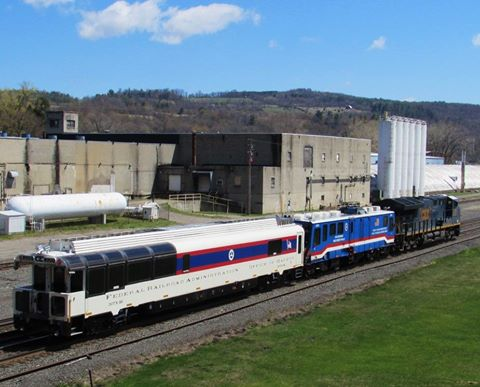
FRA Inspection Train in St. Johnsville, New York

=== 21st century safety initiatives ===
In 2011, the FRA began the process of updating its electronic device policy for active train operators.

In June 2015, the FRA announced a railway safety initiative with Google that would include the FRA's GIS data in its mapping services. The data pinpoint the location of over 250,000 rail crossings in the United States. The FRA believes that providing the location of rail crossings on maps will enhance crossing safety for people who are using navigation systems while driving. The agency also created a web portal for the public to report blocked crossings in order to collect data on the implication for safety and economy of stopped trains blocking crossings.

Citing safety concerns, in 2016 the FRA proposed a rule to mandate train crew sizes but the agency withdrew the rule in 2019 stating "that no regulation of train crew staffing is necessary or appropriate for railroad operations to be conducted safely at this time." This was in part due to the improving safety record for rail and also the implementation of PTC across nearly 60,000 route miles of track.

Following three recent derailments of long trains, the FRA in July 2023 started requiring Class 1 railroads to provide monthly data tracking train length and tonnage. The specific concern is of trains with 1) more than 200 cars, 2) length of 12,250 feet or more, or 3) weight of more than 17,000 tons.

=== Freight safety ===
The safety of rail freight transport has become an area of focus at the FRA, particularly as the industry uses longer trains. Over the past decade, the FRA reported significant improvements in rail safety because of the railroad industry's investments in infrastructure, technology, and training. For example, the overall train accident rate has decreased by 27% since 2000, and the rate of hazardous materials accidents has reached its lowest point ever, down 75% per carload since 2000.

However, the increasing length of freight trains, some now stretching nearly three miles, has presented safety challenges. Issues such as the effectiveness of braking systems and the proper arrangement of train cars, known as "train makeup," are particularly critical in ensuring safe operations, especially under extreme conditions like steep grades or sharp curves. The U.S. Government Accountability Office (GAO) has recognized that the FRA is investigating the safety implications of longer trains, conducting system-wide safety audits, and issuing advisories to address potential risks.

The FRA's ongoing efforts include collaborations with freight railroads to enhance safety through advanced technologies and stringent compliance with safety regulations. As freight rail operations continue to grow in complexity, both the FRA and railroad companies have worked on addressing new safety issues.

== Notable investigations ==
The FRA played a significant role in investigating the Norfolk Southern train derailment in East Palestine, Ohio, which occurred on February 3, 2023. The derailment involved a train carrying hazardous materials, and the FRA's investigation revealed that the primary cause was a failed journal bearing on one of the train's cars. The FRA also identified contributing factors, including inadequate communication protocols related to hotbox detectors and the use of general-purpose tank cars for transporting flammable liquids, which exacerbated the severity of the incident.

In response to the derailment, the FRA initiated several enforcement cases and called for more stringent safety regulations, particularly concerning the placement and operation of wayside detectors designed to identify overheating bearings. The investigation highlighted the need for enhanced safety measures in the freight rail industry, leading the FRA to advocate for legislative changes and more rigorous oversight of rail operations.

On July 23, 2024, FRA Administrator Amit Bose testified before a congressional hearing regarding the derailment. In his testimony, Bose emphasized the FRA's findings that the accident was caused by a failed roller bearing, compounded by inadequate communication and safety procedures within Norfolk Southern. He also called for stronger legislative action to enhance rail safety and criticized the railroad industry's resistance to adopting new safety measures, urging Congress to act swiftly to address these ongoing issues.

== List of administrators ==
Image	Name	Year began	Year end	Appointed by
	A. Scheffer Lang	1967	1969	Lyndon B. Johnson
	Reginald Whitman	1969	1970	Richard Nixon
	John W. Ingram	1971	1974	Richard Nixon
	Asaph H. Hall	1975	1977	Gerald Ford
	John M. Sullivan	1977	1981	Jimmy Carter
	Robert W. Blanchette	1981	1983	Ronald Reagan
	John H. Riley	1983	1989	Ronald Reagan
	Gil Carmichael	1989	1993	George H. W. Bush
	Jolene Molitoris	1993	2000	Bill Clinton
	Allan Rutter	2001	2004	George W. Bush
	Betty Monro (acting)	2004	2005	George W. Bush
	Robert D. Jamison (acting)	2005	2005	George W. Bush
	Joseph H. Boardman	2005	2008	George W. Bush
	Clifford C. Eby (acting)	2008	2009	George W. Bush
	Joe Szabo	2009	2015	Barack Obama
	Sarah Feinberg	2015	2017	Barack Obama
	Patrick T. Warren (acting)	2017	2017	Donald Trump
	Heath Hall (acting)	2017	2018	Donald Trump
	Juan Reyes (acting)	2018	2018	Donald Trump
	Ronald Batory	2018	2021	Donald Trump
	Amit Bose (acting)	2021	2022	Joe Biden
	Amit Bose	2022	2025	Joe Biden
	Michael Lestingi (acting)	2025	2025	Donald Trump
	Drew Feeley (acting)	2025	2025	Donald Trump
	David Fink	2025	Present	Donald Trump

== Northeast Corridor Future ==
The FRA's Northeast Corridor (NEC) Future is a long-term plan aimed at improving the nation's Northeast Corridor. The NEC Future plan consists of four components (also known as the Selective Alternative) that are: Improve rail service, Modernize NEC infrastructure, Expand rail capacity, and Study New Haven-to-Providence capacity. These four components all aim to improve the reliability and performance of the NEC system, whether it be through intercity or regional means. The Selective Alternative looks to do four major things: Improve rail service by increasing frequency of trains, decreasing travel time, and making better passenger convenience; Modernize NEC infrastructure by having corridor-wide repair and replacing and fixing parts to bring the entire system to increased reliability; Expand rail capacity by adding new infrastructure between cities and increasing train speeds and capacity; and Study New Haven to Providence capacity.

The NEC Future ROD (Record of Decision) was issued in July 2017, which marked the completion of the Tier 1 environmental review process. The ROD lays out everything involved with the project, including the plan itself and feedback from individuals, organizations, and stakeholders. There is no listed completion date for the NEC Future and Selective Alternative.

== National Rail Plan ==
=== Background ===
The need for an NRP was brought up in the Passenger Rail Investment and Improvement Act of 2008. However, before the official plan could be drafted, the Passenger Rail Investment and Improvement Act (PRIIA) required a Preliminary National Rail Plan (PNRP) to be made first, which was submitted to Congress on October 15, 2009. On December 16, 2009, the Consolidated Appropriations Act of 2010 was enacted into law and established the delivery date for the NRP. The delivery date for the NRP was September 15, 2010.

=== The goal ===
With the nation's infrastructure growing, the transportation used in the nation also needs to grow. With that in mind, the NRP's main goal is to increase the size of the nation's railway capacity to include 70 million more people and 2.8 billion tons more of freight within the next 25 years, and 100 million more people and 4 billion tons more of freight within the next 40 years. The NRP also looks to continue improving the rail systems' safety.

=== High-speed intercity travel ===
Another one of the NRP's big goals is the introduction of a high-speed train made for intercity travel. These trains would be much faster than normal trains, ranging in speed from 125–250 mph (200–400 km/h), and capable of delivering a passenger 500 miles (800 km) in about 2–3 hours. In smaller, regional areas, the trains would not be as quick, only going somewhere between 90–125 mph (145–201 km/h). There are no set costs for this system, however. The FRA argues that the benefits a high-speed rail system would bring outweigh the costs for the system, claiming that the high-speed rail system would reduce car traffic and eliminate the need for short-haul flights. It would also reduce congestion in America's more populated regions and boost manufacturing activity.

== See also ==
- FRA DOTX 219, a track geometry car operated by the FRA
- The Surface Transportation Board manages economic aspects of railroads, including rates, service, acquisition, and abandonment.
- The Federal Transit Administration provides financial and technical assistance to local public transit agencies, including local rail operators not regulated by the FRA (subway, elevated rail, and light rail).
- The Interstate Commerce Commission, abolished in 1995, regulated railroad safety before the creation of the FRA.
- The National Transportation Safety Board investigates transportation accidents and crashes, including those involving railroads.
- The United States Railroad Administration managed the national railroad system during World War I, in operation from 1917 to 1920.
- Rail speed limits in the United States

== Gallery ==
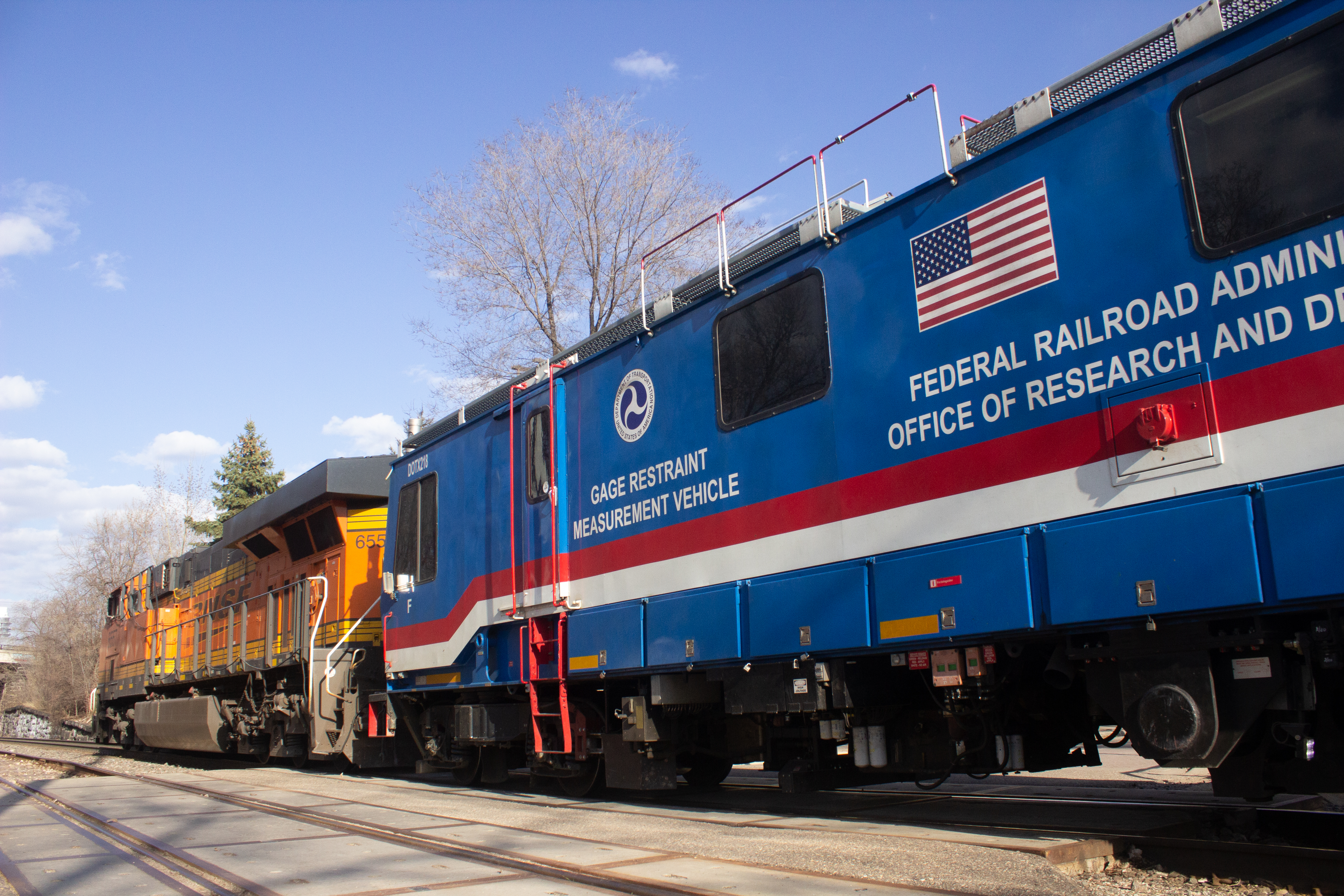
DOTX 218 Gage Restraint Measurement Vehicle

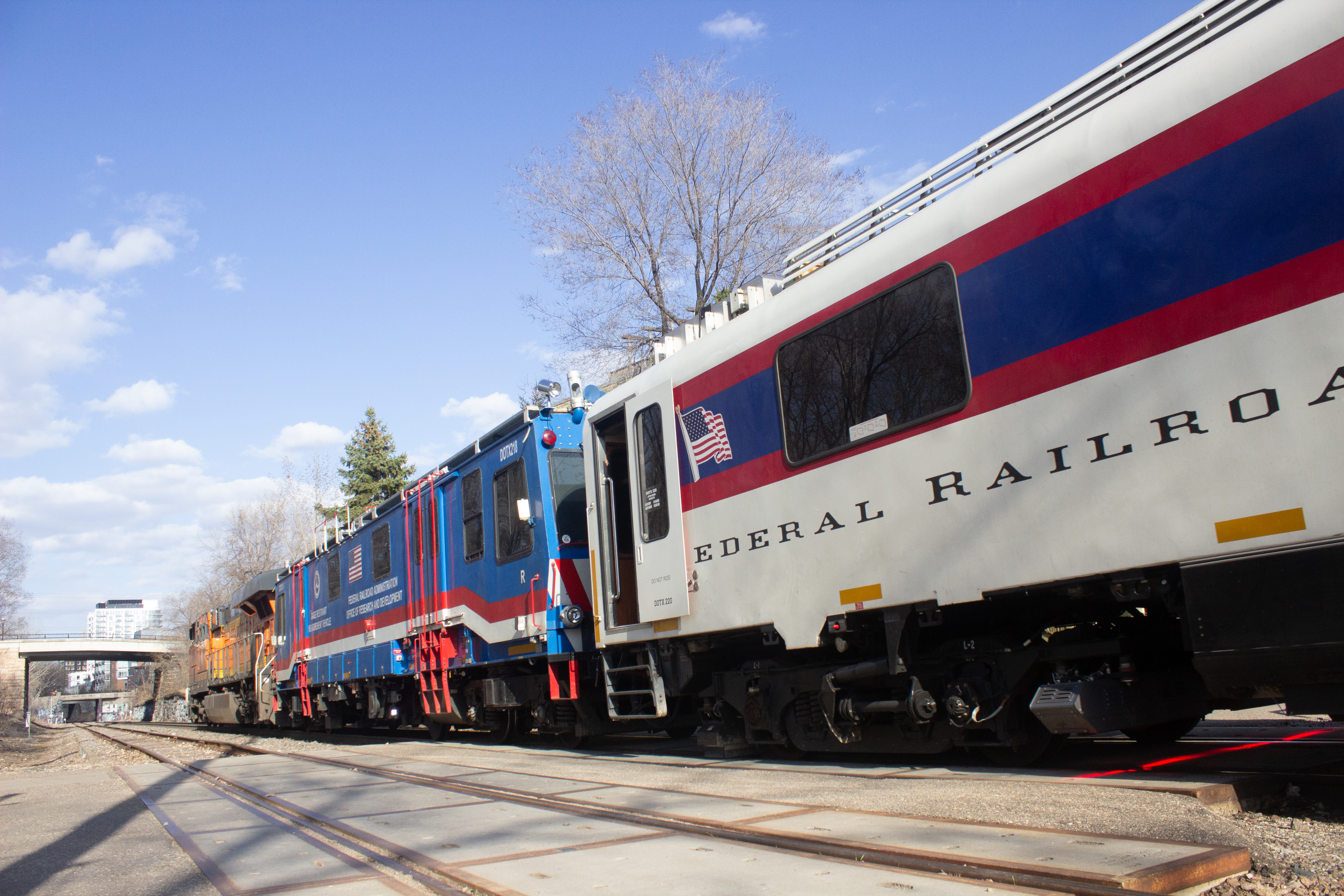
DOTX 218 and DOTX 220 behind a BNSF locomotive

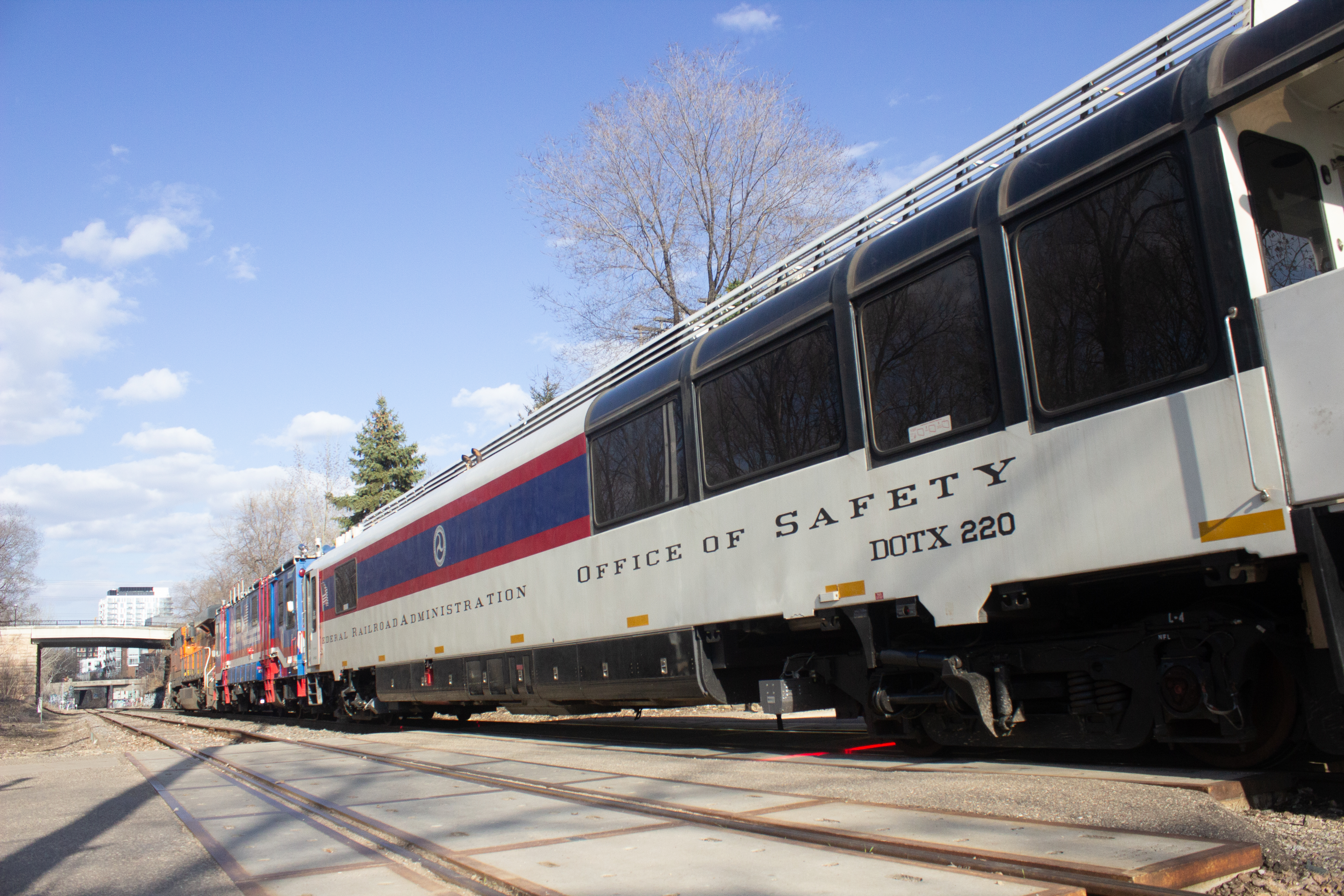
DOTX 220 Track Geometry Car
