= Territorial disputes between Kalmykia and Astrakhan Oblast =

Territorial disputes between Kalmykia and Astrakhan Oblast, two federal subjects in southwestern Russia, refer to a number of land claims expressed by Kalmyk politicians and activists since the 1950s to the present day. They have been the subject of federal lawsuits and led to small-scale real-life conflicts on several occasions, such as a nomadic herder from Kalmykia being arrested and his cattle confiscated by Astrakhan park rangers after he entered land they considered theirs despite the borders shown in government-approved maps.

== Background ==
Prior to the Russian Revolution of 1917, most of the Kalmyk ethnic homeland was governed as a part of the Astrakhan Governorate. When the Kalmyk Autonomous Oblast was established by the Bolsheviks, Astrakhan became its first administrative seat and held that status for 7 years before it was transferred to the current capital, Elista. In 1943, virtually all ethnic Kalmyks living in the USSR at the time were deported to Siberia after Joseph Stalin accused them of Axis collaboration. Soon afterwards Kalmykia was dissolved as a separate entity and the Soviet government redistributed its districts between neighboring regions such as Astrakhan Oblast and Stavropol Krai.

== Limansky and Narimanovsky districts ==
After the Kalmyk deportees were allowed to return to their homeland in 1956, Kalmykia's status as a separate autonomous region was restored. However, the region's new borders did not correspond to those that existed before its 1943 abolition. The authorities of both Stavropol Krai and Astrakhan Oblast tried to keep some of the land they acquired from the former Kalmyk Autonomous Oblast. One of the early post-restoration leaders of Soviet Kalmykia, Basan Gorodovikov, succeeded in getting back Iki-Burulsky District from Stavropol, but not Dolbansky and Privolzhsky Districts that were transferred to Astrakhan and subsequently renamed to Limansky and Narimanovsky District.

According to the Kalmyk historian Maria Ochir, Gorodovikov planned to ask Central Committee members to return the two districts on behalf of his people. However, a draft of his speech was leaked to the KGB and he was fired before he managed to bring up the issue. Since then and to this day, there has been an informal moratorium on the topic among Kalmykia's formal leadership.

According to the Israeli journalist and political analyst Dor Shabashewitz, the idea of returning the two lost districts is an important part of the Kalmyk national identity. Even though the republic's formal authorities do not talk of it publicly, it is often brought up by various opposition movements in the region, including the Oirat-Kalmyk People's Congress which campaigns for the independence of Kalmykia. The provisional declaration of independence signed by the members of the Congress in 2022 mentions lands "stolen from the Kalmyk people during the deportation" without explicitly describing the territories in question.

== Other disputes ==
After the Dissolution of the Soviet Union, a series of smaller-scale territorial disputes emerged between Kalmykia and Astrakhan Oblast. The most well-known case that has been openly brought up by Kalmykia's government officials pertains to three uncontiguous swathes of sparsely populated desert on the border between Limansky and Chernozemelsky districts. Astrakhan Oblast authorities claim these lands as their own based on indefinite lease agreements that were granted to a number of Soviet-era collective farms before the restoration of Kalmykia in the 1950s. In 2007, Kalmyk officials filed a lawsuit against the neighboring region but in the end the High Court of Arbitration of Russia supported the arguments presented by Astrakhan's authorities.
