= Commodity Classification Standards Board =

The Commodity Classification Standards Board (CCSB) develops and maintains National Motor Freight Classification (NMFC). The CCSB is an autonomous board of three to seven full-time employees of the National Motor Freight Traffic Association (NMFTA). The CCSB's staff includes a lawyer and a packaging consultant.

The National Motor Freight Traffic Association hosts three meetings a year at which the CCSB considers proposals to amend the National Motor Freight Classification and the association considers topics of interest to its members.

== See also ==
- Freight
- Less than truckload shipping
