= Báthory (surname) =

Báthory is a surname of Hungarian origin that is also common in Poland and Slovakia.

== Hungarian nobility ==
- Báthory, a Hungarian noble family of the Gutkeled clan
- Stephen III Báthory (died 1444), Palatine of Hungary
- Stephen V Báthory (died 1493), Voivod of Transylvania
- Stephen VII Báthory (died 1530), Hungarian commander, Palatine of Hungary
- Stephen VIII Báthory (1477–1534), Voivod of Transylvania
- Christopher Báthory (1530–1581), administered Transylvania as voivod during the absence of his brother
- Stephen Báthory of Poland (1533–1586), Voivod (and later Prince) of Transylvania and King of Poland/Grand Duke of Lithuania
- Andrew Báthory (1562 or 1566–1599), cousin of Sigismund, Prince of Transylvania, Grand Master of the Order of the Dragon
- Sigismund Báthory (1572–1613), son of Christopher, Prince of Transylvania
- Gabriel Báthory (1589–1613), nephew of Andrew, Prince of Transylvania.
- Elizabeth Báthory (died 1614), infamous as the "Blood Countess", one of the first known serial killers

== Others ==
- Júlia Báthory (1901−2000), Hungarian glass designer
- Dennis Báthory-Kitsz (born 1949), Hungarian-American author and composer
- Zoltan Bathory, founder and songwriter for heavy metal band Five Finger Death Punch

== See also ==
- Bathory (disambiguation)
