= Congress of the Oirat-Kalmyk People =

Registered organization in USA

Congress of the Oirat-Kalmyk People Конгресс ойрат-калмыцкого народа Chuulhn
- Chairman: Batyr Boromangnaev
- First Secretary: E.E.Sangadzhiev
- Standing Committee: V. N. Dovdanov, A. B. Sandzhiev,
- Founded: 12 December 2015
- Registered: Registered as a Non-Governmental and Non-Profit organization in March 2023
- Headquarters: New York City
- Ideology: Kalmyk nationalism

Website
- congressoftheoiratkalmykpeople.org oiratcongress.org

The Congress of the Oirat-Kalmyk People (Russian: Конгресс ойрат-калмыцкого народа), also known as the Chuulhn (Oirat: Чуулһн, romanized: Çuulhn, Oirat pronunciation: [t͡ʃuːlˈɣən]) in Kalmyk Oirat Mongolian, is a registered worldwide organization claiming to represent all Kalmyk people or broadly people of Russia's Republic of Kalmykia.

== History ==
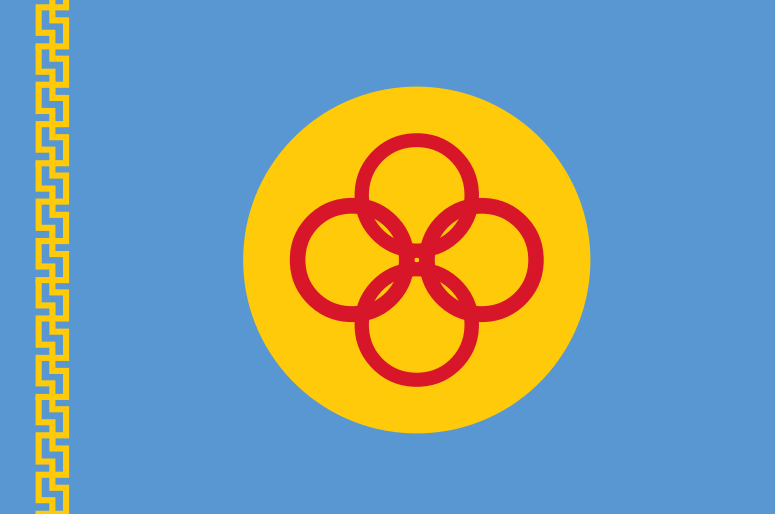
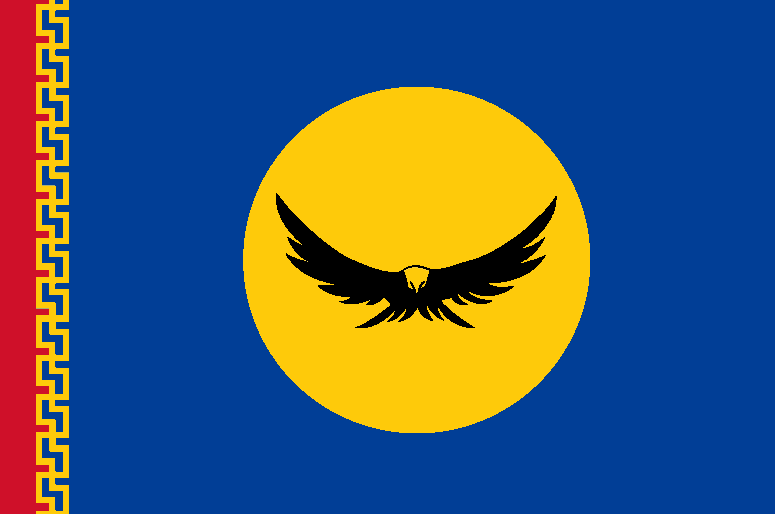
Some of the flags used by the Congress' members during rallies, one of them was similar to the flag of Kazakhstan

While the organization has its roots in Kalmyk nationalist organizations from the Soviet era, from All Oirat-Kalmyk Convention held in 1920 in the settlement of Chilgir Yashkulsky District, and declared Kalmyk autonomy in the Russian Federation. The first congress of the Oirat-Kalmyk people took place on 12 December 2015, in Elista, the capital city of Kalmykia, with around 200 popular delegates participating in total. A total of 3 congresses have been convened since 2015, the latest in May 2021. During this third congress on May 29, 2021 five delegates to the congress had criminal proceedings opened against them by Russian authorities for "participation in an unsanctioned public event" with one of the delegates being Batyr Boromangnaev, the chairman of the Kalmykia branch of Yabloko.

=== Russo-Ukrainian war ===
During the 2022 Russo-Ukrainian war the organization came out against the war publicly. The "Congress of the Oirat-Kalmyk People", Representative A.B. Sandziev, stated that over the past 400 years Kalmyks participated in all military conflicts on the side of Russia, but that they cannot support a war with Ukraine. The "Congress of the Oirat-Kalmyk People" further stated that the war is harming the Kalmyk genetic pool for an "insane massacre in Ukraine", urging Kalmyks must not to participate in the conflict.

On 27 October 2022, the "Congress of the Oirat-Kalmyk People" published a declaration of independence of Kalmykia and proclaimed the creation of an independent Kalmyk state. In September 2023 the Congress announced that it was in the process of forming a battalion to fight on behalf of Ukraine as part of its International Legion.

On February 28, 2023, Batyr Boromangnaev was detained in Mongolia due to an expired passport and faced deportation to Russia to face criminal charges. His passport had expired while he was detained in Kazakhstan which he passed through en route to Mongolia. Boromangnaev was ultimately allowed to travel to the United States, namely to New York City where he has moved the headquarters of the Congress.

== Ideology and activity ==
The main stated reason for the gathering of the congress was the issue of statehood, which Kalmykia, unlike all of Russia's other republics, does not legally possess. Other things that the congress sought to address were the right to Self-Determination, making the use of the Kalmyk-Oirat language obligatory in areas defined by local and federal laws, establishing a new constitution for the republic, as well as other economic, demographic, and political issues facing the Kalmyk people.

The organization has also politically campaigned against Batu Khasikov's rule of Kalmykia and Dmitry Trapeznikov position as mayor of Elista, due to perceived incompetence and corruption. After large-scale protests, the Kremlin denied it was behind Trapeznikov's appointment to mayor.

Another change the congress has pushed for is the resolution of the territorial disputes between Kalmykia and Astrakhan Oblast by returning the historically Kalmyk Dolbansky and Volga uluses (districts) which were transferred to Astrakhan under Stalin's leadership following the deportation of Kalmyks in 1943.

Following the start of the Russo-Ukrainian War in 2022, the Oirat-Kalmyk People's Congress joined hands with other separatist groups, the Free Idel-Ural movement and Buryat Mongols to form the "Free Nations League". The stated goal of the league is to protect the rights of nations held captive by Russia. Vladimir Dovdanov, a Kalmyk representative in the league, stated that what is most important is that Kalmyks are seen as subjects of the state, rather than disposable objects.

=== State persecution ===
Numerous incidents of Oirat-Kalmyk People's Congress members being persecuted have been claimed by activists. The organizers of the congress were detained following a convocation in 2021. An Elista court then assigned them 50 hours of compulsory work for holding an unsanctioned public event. Members of the organization have also been branded as agents of Kyiv by the Russian government, being arrested after accusations of espionage.After some members were arrested many activists left Russia, including leaders Batyr Boromangnaev and Arslang Sandzhiev, who in late 2022 and March 2023 relocated to the U.S.. In March 2023 the Congress of the Oirat-Kalmyk People established a headquarters in New York City. On August 23 2023 Russia's Supreme Court ruled that "Congress of the Oirat-Kalmyk People" a "extremists" organization and banned any activity on all over Russian Federation.
