= National Motor Freight Classification =

Standard that provides a comparison of commodities moving in commerce

The National Motor Freight Classification (NMFC) is a North American voluntary standard that provides a comparison of commodities moving in interstate, intrastate and international commerce via freight shipment. The standard is developed and maintained by the Freight Classification Development Council (FCDC) and published by the National Motor Freight Traffic Association (NMFTA).

== Classification ==
Similar in concept to the groupings or grading systems used in other industries, with the NMFC, commodities are grouped into one of 18 classes—from a low of class 50 to a high of class 500. Classification is based on an evaluation of four transportation characteristics: density, stowability, handling and risk or liability. Together, these characteristics establish a commodity's "transportability."

The NMFC also specifies minimum packaging requirements to ensure that goods are adequately protected in the motor carrier environment and can be handled and stowed in a manner that is reasonably safe and practicable. It contains various rules that govern and otherwise relate to the classification and/or packaging of commodities as well as procedures for the filing and disposition of claims, and procedures governing interline settlements. It also contains the Uniform Straight Bill of Lading, including its terms and conditions.

== Usage ==
Many major freight shippers in the US, including the US government, require carriers they use to be members of the NMFTA and possess a Standard Carrier Alpha Code (SCAC) provided by the NMFTA to members. Membership in the NMFTA requires usage of the NMFC. This has led to the NMFC becoming the de facto standard for freight classification in North America.

== See also ==
- Freight
- Less than truckload shipping
- Commodity Classification Standards Board
