= Taneke Batyr =

Kazakh tribal leader

The Taneke Batyr was a Kazakh tribal leader who lived from c. 1807 to 1884 in the present-day Aksu district of Taldykorgan region. Alongside Chokan Valikhanov, he influenced peaceful dialogue between the Kazakh clans and the Russian Empire, which occupied the Kazakh lands during the reign of Batyr. Taneke Batyr was a relative of the famous General Baribay Batyr; he died at the age of 77 years. Initially, the cemetery where Batyr rests built in 1885. The cemetery is ancestral and relatives of the Batyr buried there.

== Mausoleum of Taneke Batyr ==
The mausoleum of Taneke Batyr was built later than the cemetery. The exact date is unknown. The mausoleum is located about 100 km from the Taldykorgan city near highway R-127 between the villages of Kapal and Arasan. Mazar of the Taneke Batyr is similar to the cradle, due to the upper facade covered with an impressive height. At present, the Mazar almost destroyed, and a small wall remains that there was a mausoleum. In 1992, the descendants of Batyr installed a slab with an inscription and a crescent moon engraved on it. The territory of Mazar surrounded by a metal fence. There are other graves of the Batyrs family near the Mazar. The monument-mausoleum is a historical and architectural heritage, included in the list of monuments and protected by the state.

== Source and links ==
- Қорғаған ұлан – байтақ даласын Батыр бабам – рухы биік данасың!
- Постановление акимата Алматинской области от 27 апреля 2010 года № 53 «Об утверждении Государственного списка памятников истории и культуры местного значения Алматинской области»
- Управление культуры, архивов и документации Алматинской области - Сакральные места Алматинской области
- НП.kz Люди
- Танеке Батыр
