= Batur (surname) =

Batur is a surname. Notable people with the surname include:

- Emir Batur Albayrak (born 2007), Turkish Olympian swimmer
- Emre Batur (born 1988), Turkish volleyball player
- Enis Batur (born 1952), Turkish writer
- Erdeni Batur (died 1653), Mongolian monarch
- Gheni Batur (1902–1981), Uyghur national hero
- Nur Batur (born 1952), Turkish journalist
- Ivan Batur (born 1991), Croatian Basketball player

== See also ==
- Batyr
