= National Motor Freight Traffic Association =

American freight carrier association

National Motor Freight Traffic Association, Inc.
- Formation: 1956; 70 years ago
- Type: Nonprofit
- Headquarters: Alexandria, Virginia, United States
- Website: www.nmfta.org

The National Motor Freight Traffic Association, Inc. (NMFTA)™ is a nonprofit membership organization headquartered in Alexandria, Virginia. Since 1956, NMFTA has represented the interests of the less-than-truckload (LTL) motor carrier industry, and for-hire interstate and intrastate carriers. There are two ways to join NMFTA: membership and participation in the National Motor Freight Classification (NMFC)®.

NMFTA's mission is to "Promote, advance, and improve the welfare and interests of the motor carrier industry. We do this through research, education, lobbying and developing industry standards and best practices. Our goal is to have the most informed membership to not only grow profitably, but efficiently run operations and protect against new challenges resulting from the digital era."

== Publications and Products ==
The NMFTA publishes the National Motor Freight Classification (NMFC)®, a standard that classifies cargo for those shipping LTL. The online version of the NMFC is ClassIT®. The Freight Classification Development Council, formerly known as the Commodity Classification Standards Board (CCSB), establishes, maintains, and updates the classification-related provisions of the NMFC.

The NMFTA assigns and publishes the Standard Carrier Alpha Code™ (SCAC®), a unique two- to four-letter code, for all companies except those codes used for identification of freight containers not operating exclusively in North America, intermodal chassis and trailers, non-railroad owned rail cars, and railroads. NMFTA developed SCAC identification codes in the mid 1960's to facilitate computerization in the transportation industry. The US government and other shippers in the US require carriers have an assigned SCAC in order to transport freight on their behalf. The NMFTA also assigns and publishes the Standard Point Location Code (SPLC), a numeric code to identify locations in North America that originate and receive cargo.

== Cybersecurity and Digitalization ==
For nearly a decade, the NMFTA has been conducting heavy-vehicle research. In the early 2020's, NMFTA widened their focus to include research into enterprise cybersecurity risks specific to the transportation industry. In 2025, NMFTA released their Roadmap to Resilience: A series of industry-specific cybersecurity guidebooks for independent owner operators, small fleets, and mid-sized fleets. These comprehensive resources provide trucking companies with practical guidance on securing their entire operation, from rolling assets (trucks and trailers) to maintenance facilities, to back-office operations. Through its research initiatives, NMFTA develops and implements robust cybersecurity standards and best practices to protect Class 8 vehicles, businesses, and data from cyber threats. By collaborating with industry stakeholders, government agencies, and academic institutions, NMFTA strives to enhance the resilience and security of freight transportation systems.

NMFTA hosts an annual Cybersecurity Conference each Fall. The event offers insight from industry leading speakers with backgrounds in both trucking asset and enterprise cybersecurity technology.

In addition to safeguarding the industry, NMFTA is digitizing the industry. In June 2022, the NMFTA acquired the Digital LTL Council, an initiative focused on the digitizing the entire freight industry. The Council aims to promote the adoption and implementation of digital standards, technologies, and practices to enhance efficiency, transparency, and innovation in freight transportation. By fostering collaboration among industry stakeholders, the Digital LTL Council seeks to address key challenges, streamline operations, and improve overall service quality within the transportation sector.

== See also ==
- Less than truckload shipping
- National Motor Freight Classification
- Commodity Classification Standards Board
- Standard Carrier Alpha Code
- Standard Point Location Code
