= Batyr Boromangnaev =

Kalmyk political activist

- Occupation: Political activist
- Years active: 2015-present
- Known for: Founder and chairman of the Congress of the Oirat-Kalmyk People

Batyr Boromangnaev is a Kalmyk political activist who has served as the chairman of the Kalmykia branch of Yabloko, as well as founding and leading the Congress of the Oirat-Kalmyk People.

== Biography ==
Boromangnaev has been the Kalmyk representative to the Free Nations of Post-Russia Forum since the Congress of Oriat-Kalmyk people joined it.

On December 11, 2021, Boromangnaev was fined 30,000 rubles for tweeting that Russia is a state where "human rights and freedoms are not respected but are totally violated." In response he stated that the "court came to the absurd, in my opinion, conclusion that I had offended Putin's personal dignity." He would then be fined 1640 euros for claiming historical parallels between Putin's government and Nazi Germany's practices on March 7, 2022.

Boromangnaev participated in the third meeting of the Congress of the Oirat-Kalmyk People on May 29, 2021, after which the Russian government opened criminal proceedings against him for "participation in an unsanctioned public event."

On February 28, 2023, Boromangnaev was detained in Mongolia and faced deportation to Russia due to an expired passport, with Boromangnaev stating that his passport had expired while he was being detained in Kazakhstan which he passed through en route to Mongolia. Eventually Boromangnaev was allowed to depart the Ulaanbaatar airport for the United States following extensive negotiating by the Free Nations League and various other organizations.
