= Standard Carrier Alpha Code =

Two to four letters identifier for freight carriers

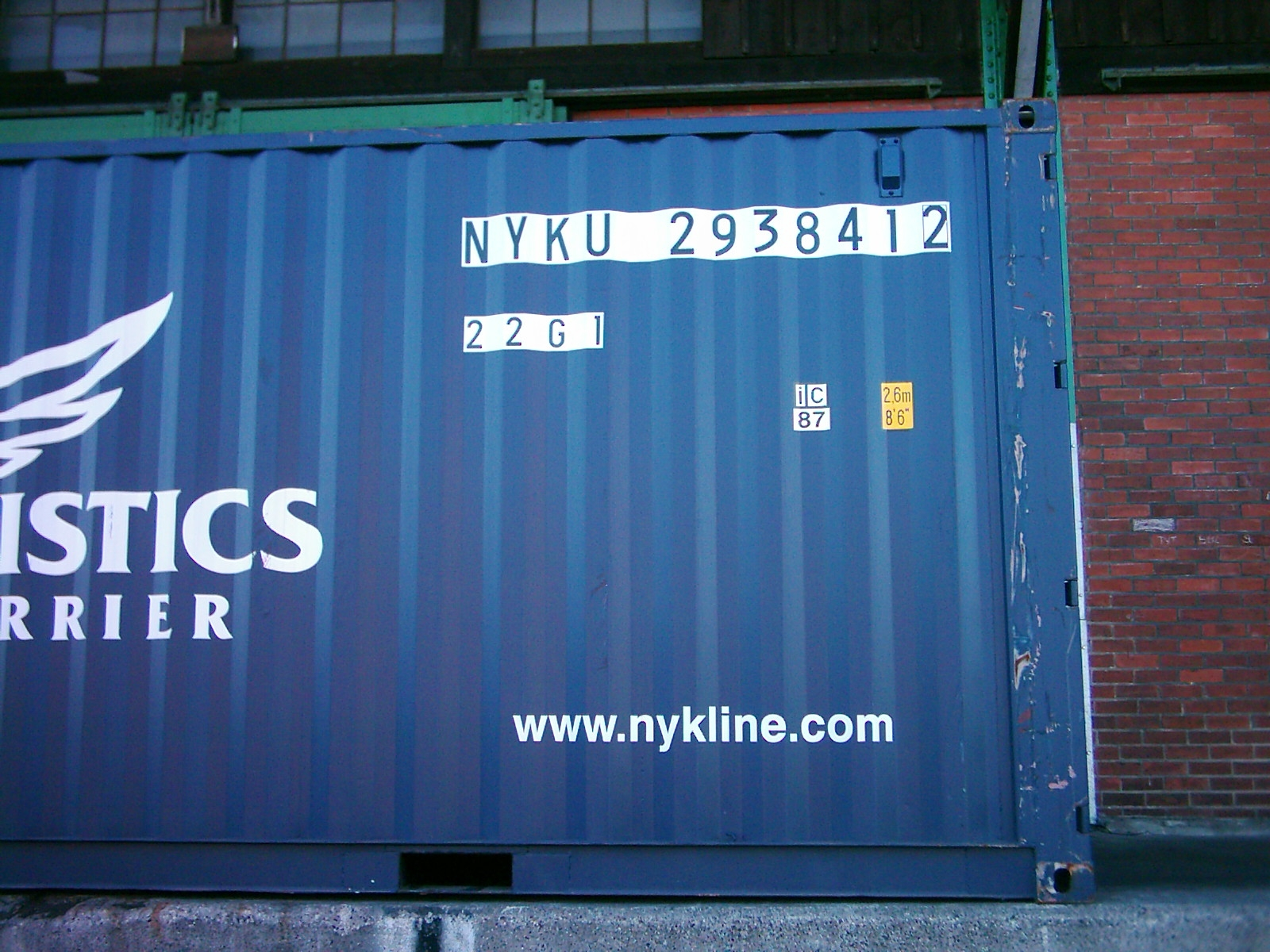
Note that containers typically show ISO 6346 code, and not the standard carrier alpha code. The container shows "NYKU", but a NYK Line SCAC would be "NYKS".

The Standard Carrier Alpha Code (SCAC) is a privately controlled US code used to identify vessel operating common carriers (VOCC). It is typically two to four letters long. The National Motor Freight Traffic Association developed the SCAC code in the 1960s to help road transport companies computerize data and records.

== Description ==
The Standard Carrier Alpha Code, a two-to-four letter identification, is used by the transportation industry to identify freight carriers in computer systems and shipping documents such as Bill of Lading, Freight Bill, Packing List, and Purchase Order. It is also used by the American National Standards Institute, Accredited Standards Committee X12, and United Nations EDIFACT for Electronic Data Interchange computer systems.

SCACs are commonly used by the automobile, petroleum, forest products, and chemical industries; as well as suppliers to retail businesses, carriers engaged in railroad piggyback trailers, and ocean container drayage. SCACs can be obtained online at http://www.nmfta.org.

Freight Carriers who participate in the Uniform Intermodal Interchange Agreement (UIIA) are required to maintain a SCAC. Certain groups of SCACs are reserved for specific purposes. Codes ending with the letter "U" are reserved for the identification of freight containers. Codes ending with the letter "X" are reserved for the identification of privately owned railroad cars. Codes ending with the letter "Z" are reserved for the identification of truck chassis and trailers used in intermodal service.

SCAC is also used to identify an ocean carrier or self-filing party, such as a freight forwarder, for the Automated Manifest System used by US Customs and Border Protection for electronic import customs clearance and for manifest transmission as per the USA's "24 Hours Rule" which requires the carrier to transmit a cargo manifest to US Customs at least 24 hours prior to a vessel's departure at port of loading.

== Widely used SCACs ==
The following is a list of widely used SCACs:

SCAC	Carrier name
AACT	AAA Cooper Transportation
AYAF	AAFES PRIVATE FLEET
ABFS	ABF FREIGHT
PYLE	A. DUIE PYLE, INC.
ALLV	ALLIED VAN LINES
ARFW	AMERICAN FREIGHTWAYS
ANRM	ALIANCA
ANTC	AMINO TRANSPORT
AVRT	Averitt Express
BAXG	BAX GLOBAL (now defunct)
BKFB	Bulk FR8 (Liquid Bulk)
BLOJ	Bridge Logistics
BNAF	BAX GLOBAL (air - now defunct)
BTEY	BT EXPRESS FREIGHT SYSTEMS
CHRP	CHEEMA TRANSPORT INC
CMCP	CAMIONNAGE CP
CBNP	CARBONITE LOGISTICS
CTII	CENTRAL TRANSPORT
CNPC	Carolina Transportation Inc
CGSQ	Carolina Logistics Inc
CDNK	Celadon
CHKA	Chermak Cartage, LLC
CJRF	CJR Trucking, Inc.
CJRQ	Cheeseman Transport
CKPQ	CLARK TRANSPORTATION, INC.
CKOC	Clark Oil Company
CMDU	CMA CGM
COSU	China Ocean Shipping Lines
COTO	Country Transport
CPGP	Container Port Group
CESF	Continental Expedited Services, Inc.
CWAS	Cowan systems, LLC
CWCE	CON-WAY CENTRAL EXPRESS
CWIM	CON-WAY INTERMODAL
CWSE	CON-WAY SOUTHERN EXPRESS
CWWE	CON-WAY WESTERN EXPRESS
CSXT	CSX TRANSPORTATION
CIMC	CUSHING TRANSPORTATION,
DIDI	DHT Logistics, LLC
DYLT	Daylight Transport LLC
DAFG	DAYTON FREIGHT
DMLI	Diamond Logistics
DMER	Dimerco Express (USA) Corp.
DOLR	DOT-LINE TRANSPORTATION
DSVF	DSV OCEAN TRANSPORT A/S
ELOI	Ease Logistics
EGLV	Evergreen
EWCF	EMERY WORLDWIDE
ENIC	EMPIRE NATIONAL INC
EXLA	Estes Express
EXDO	Expeditors International Ocean
FDCC	FedEx Custom Critical
FDEG	FEDEX GROUND
FDE	FedEx Express (AIR)
FLJF	FLT LOGISTICS LLC
FTNA	Fortune Transportation
FWFG	FIFTH WHEEL FREIGHT LLC
FXFE	FedEx LTL Freight East
FXFW	FedEx LTL Freight West (formerly VIKN - Viking)
FXNL	FedEx Freight National (formerly Watkins)
GPTC	G & P Trucking, Inc.
GBEA	GILBERT EAST CORP
GBXI	GILBERT EXPRESS
GUMA	GULICK TRUCKING, INC.
HAEI	Heartland Express
A0GO	Hier Logistic Group S. de R.L. de C.V.
HDTI	Danny Herman Trucking, Inc.
HLCU	Hapag-Lloyd AG
HLOG	HOW Logistics Group
HJBT	J.B. Hunt Transport Services, Inc.
HOYO	HOYER Deep Sea
HRCF	Hercules Forwarding LLC
HUBG	Hub Group
IEXA	Intelcom Express
IELC	Integrity Express Logistics
INML	INTERMODAL SERVICES
ITFC	ITF LLC
HJBT	J.B. HUNT
KAEJ	KANE IS ABLE
KHNN	KUEHNE + NAGEL
KNIG	Knight Transportation
LDYN	Logistic Dynamics, Inc.
LDYQ	LDI Trucking, Inc.
MAEU	Maersk Line
MCPU	MCC Transport Singapore Pte Ltd.
MFGT	Mainfreigh Inc
MEDU	Mediterranean Shipping Company S.A.
MGMC	MGM TRANSPORT.
MISH	Mississippi Transporters Inc.
MTEN	Marten Transport, Ltd.
NAFT	NATIONAL FREIGHT
NAVI	North American Van Lines, Inc.
NXPL	National Xpress Logistics
NYKS	NYK
NYKU	NYK
ODFL	OLD DOMINION FREIGHT LINE
OLLD	Olympiad Line, LLC
OOLU	Orient Overseas Container Line
PAAF	Pilot Freight Services
PAYL	PAYSTAR LOGISTICS
PENS	Peninsula Truck Lines
PFLP	PACIFIC LOGISTICS CORP
PAMT	PAM Transport Inc
PSQL	PERFORMANCE LOGISTICS
PDME	PIEDMONT EXPRESS
PMKO	Prime Inc. (Tanker)
PNEP	Panalpina (Pantainer Express Line)
PRIJ	Prime Inc. (OTR)
PRIU	Prime Inc. (Intermodal)
PRML	Prime Inc. (Logistics)
GMLS	R and L Carriers
RCXB	Red Classic Transportation Services, LLC
RDWY	Roadway (YRC)
RGLN	Radiant Global Logistics
ROWL	Rowl Trucking
RXLI	Route Transportation & Logistics
RYOM	Royal Oil
RDSS	Rail Delivery Services, Inc.
RUSS	Russel Delivery Services, Inc.
SAFM	Safmarine
SAIA	Saia LTL Freight
SCNN	Schneider National
SDYA	Same Day Air Logistics
SNCY	Schneider National
SNLU	Schneider National
SXVE	Silver Enterprises
STVV	Stevens Transport
SUDU	Hamburg Süd
SWFT	SWIFT TRANSPORTATION
SZCP	Sazerac Transportation
TCKM	Truckers America
TEUG	TEU Global (Trade Expeditors USA, INC. DBA TEU GLOBAL)
TPNW	Triple A Logistics
TRKU	TURKON LINE INC
UDRY	USAW - USA Logistics
UPGF	UPS FREIGHT (FKA Overnite Transportation Co / OVNT)
UPSN	United Parcel Service
UPSS	United Parcel Service
UPSC	United Parcel Service
UPSZ	United Parcel Service
USAU	U.S. Government
USAX	U.S. Government
UQEP	UNIQUE EXPRESS
UYSN	UNYSON
USIT	USA Truck
USNW	U.S. Northwest Express or USNW Express
USPS	United States Postal Service
USXI	U.S. Xpress
VCTS	Vocar Transportation Services, LLC.
VLOQ	VANEDGE LOGISTICS
VSRD	Vistar Transportation Ltd.
WPLA	Watchpoint Logistics
WSXI	Western Express, Inc.
WTAG	WTA Global Inc.
XUI	Xpress United Inc.
XPOC	XPO, Inc.
FICS	First International courier sys.
SKQW	SILQ LLC

== See also ==
- Bill of Lading
- EDIFACT
- Electronic Data Interchange
- ISO 6346, an international standard for marking intermodal containers
- Less than truckload
- National Motor Freight Traffic Association
- Reporting mark
