= Intelcom =

Canadian courier company

- Type: Privately held company
- Industry: Courier
- Founded: 1986 in Montreal, Quebec, Canada
- Headquarters: Montreal, Quebec, Canada
- Number of locations: 60 stations across Canada (2021) (2018)
- Areas served: Canada, United States, Australia, Netherlands
- Key people: TBC
- Products: Courier express services Express mail delivery
- Number of employees: 2,460
- Subsidiaries: Dragonfly Shipping Ltd.
- Website: intelcom.ca

Intelcom (also known as Intelcom Courier Canada Inc.) is a Canadian courier and package delivery company headquartered in Montreal, Quebec. The company delivers nearly 500,000 parcels per day across Canada.

Intelcom’s clients include Amazon as well as Pitney Bowes and Landmark Global, which handle shipping for Etsy and eBay. Intelcom significantly expanded its business operations to Australia in 2021. Since 2017, the company has been noted in Canadian media for its delivery issues and unsafe working conditions.

Daniel Hudon created the company in 1986 as a same-day delivery service for businesses.

In 2000, Canada Post bought 50% of Intelcom Express’ shares. The process was controversial, as the company had ties to the Liberal Party of Canada. Critics questioned the fairness of the decision-making process at Canada Post. These shares were repurchased by Intelcom Express in 2007.

In 2012, Intelcom Express entered the pharmaceutical delivery business with the purchase of Le Livreur Plus Inc. and Eco Plus Inc. services for the province of Quebec.

In 2015, Amazon tested Intelcom’s delivery services. Shortly thereafter, they signed on to expand the relationship across the country. Intelcom then secured an investment from the Business Development Bank of Canada and the Caisse de dépôt et placement du Québec.

In 2021, Intelcom launched its subsidiary Dragonfly Shipping in Australia. Dragonfly Shipping became the first high-volume seven-day-a-week delivery service in Australia. In 2024, Intelcom expanded the Dragonfly brand to cover all regions outside of Quebec. In 2025, it launched its first services in the Netherlands, and became a delivery partner of Amazon.

== Criticism ==
Beginning in late 2017, the company faced criticism in Canada for its delivery practices. The company, subcontracted by Amazon.ca to deliver Amazon Prime packages, was featured in a November 2017 segment on Radio Canada's consumer program, La Facture, which highlighted delivery issues. The following month, Radio Canada wrote about Christmas gift thieves and featured Intelcom Express delivery problems in condominiums.

In June 2022, customers in Yellowknife and Whitehorse experienced theft, wrong packages, and delays. In response, Intelcom stated confidence in the quality of their services, citing internal performance indicators that showed they were meeting delivery requirements in Yellowknife.

Diane Crocker, writing for Halifax-based PNI Atlantic News, noted widespread issues with Amazon deliveries since Intelcom began handling them in the area. Similarly, a January 2023 CBC News report detailed delays and delivery errors in Kenora. Intelcom attributed these issues to labor shortages that "complicated the partner responsible for the Kenora area to operate at full capacity."

In 2023, Steven Laperrière, general manager of disability rights advocacy group Regroupement des activistes pour l'inclusion au Québec (RAPLIQ), accused Intelcom of discriminatory practices due to their inability to accommodate special requests from customers with disabilities, stating it was grounds for discrimination under the Quebec Human Rights Commission. Intelcom responded that they planned to update its system to better share personalized instruction with delivery drivers.

=== Unsafe work conditions ===
In 2020, delivery drivers in Ontario filed a complaint against Amazon, its subcontractor Intelcom Express, and the company that hires drivers for Intelcom Express, Seven Seas Services Inc., due to unsafe work conditions. Similar concerns arose in Sudbury, Ontario, where blocked street access caused disruptions. Intelcom stated that it had cross-validated their actions with the Greater Sudbury bylaw department to ensure compliance with zoning regulations.

In November 2024, delivery drivers in the Okanagan went on strike over unsafe working conditions. Intelcom reached a resolution after "collaborative discussions with the independent contractors who hire the drivers".
