= Standard Point Location Code =

The Standard Point Location Code® (SPLC)® is a nine-digit numeric system used by North American transportation industries, especially railroads and trucking companies. SPLC is owned and maintained by the National Motor Freight Traffic Association. SPLC exist for points within the United States, Canada, and Mexico.

SPLC ensures routing accuracy, billing consistency, and system interoperability across for-hire and private fleet motor carriers, shippers, and logistics partners by providing a standardized geographic reference for all freight movements.

For the US and Canada, the first two digits refer to a state, province or territory. The second two digits refer to a county or its equivalent. The third two digits refer to a city or municipal region. The remaining three digits refer to a specific location within the city.

For Mexican SPLC, the first three digits refer to the state and the second three digits refer to a municipal region within the state. Like the US and Canadian SPLC, the last three digits refer to a specific location within the city. If the last three digits are "000" then the SPLC is not defined beyond city.
