= Szidor Bátor =

Hungarian composer

Szidor Bátor (23 February 1860 – 2 December 1929) was a Hungarian composer from Budapest.

Notable operas include Uff Király ['King Uff'] (1885); A titkos csók ['The Secret Kiss'] (1886) and other compositions such as choral works.
