= Amit Bose (government official) =

Indian-American government official

- অমিতাভ বসু
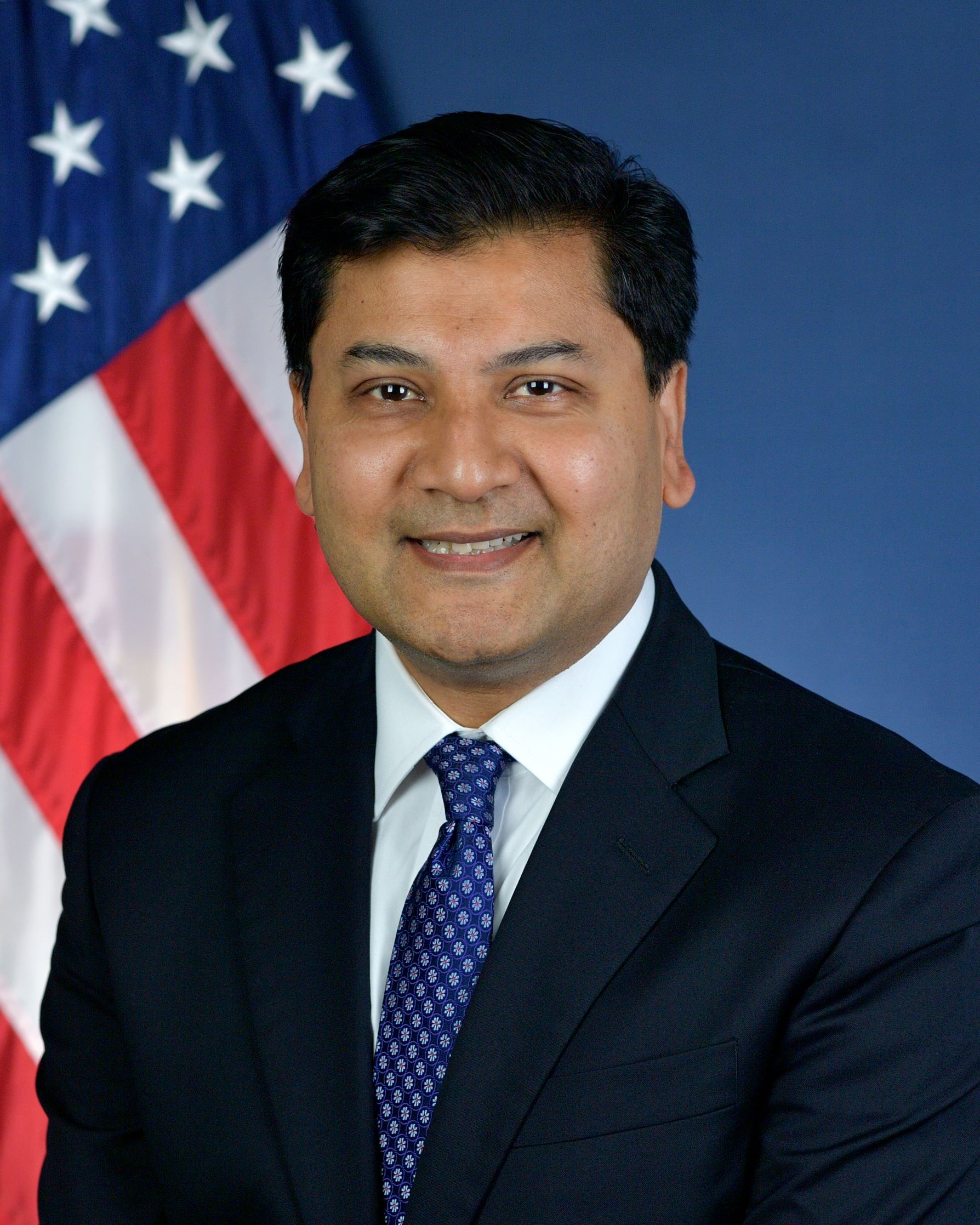

Administrator of the Federal Railroad Administration
- In office January 13, 2022 – January 20, 2025
- President: Joe Biden
- Preceded by: Ronald Batory
- Succeeded by: David Fink

Personal details
- Born: Amitabha Bose Calcutta, West Bengal, India (now Kolkata)
- Education: Columbia University (BA, MIA); University of Georgia (JD)

Amitabha Bose (Bengali: অমিতাভ বসু) is an American attorney and transportation policy advisor who served as the administrator of the Federal Railroad Administration from 2022 to 2025. Bose has served as deputy administrator since January 2021 and was confirmed by the Senate on January 12, 2022. He is the first person of South Asian descent to lead the FRA.

== Early life and education ==
Bose was born to an Indian Bengali family in Kolkata. He arrived in the United States at age five and grew up in DeKalb County, Georgia. He received a Bachelor of Arts degree from Columbia University in 1994, a Master of International Affairs from the School of International and Public Affairs, Columbia University in 1995, and a Juris Doctor from the University of Georgia School of Law.

== Career ==
Bose served in the New Jersey Department of Transportation before holding posts in the United States Department of Transportation, where he was the associate general counsel and deputy assistant secretary for governmental affairs. He later joined the Federal Railroad Administration, where he served as deputy administrator and chief counsel during the Obama administration. During his tenure at the DOT and the FRA, he was involved in the Northeast Corridor Gateway Program, California High Speed Rail Project, Northeast Corridor Future, Southeast Passenger Rail and Build America Bureau.

After leaving the public sector, Bose joined HNTB in 2017 as mid-Atlantic district transit and rail director, and associate vice president. He also served as board chairman of the Coalition for Northeast Corridor.

On January 22, 2021, Bose was appointed to the role of deputy administrator of the Federal Railroad Administration. On January 12, 2022, Bose was confirmed by the Senate to be the administrator of the Federal Railroad Administration by a vote of 68–29.
