= Bathory (disambiguation) =

The Báthory family were a Hungarian noble family of the Gutkeled clan.

- Elizabeth Báthory, a Hungarian noblewoman and alleged murderer from the Báthory family

Bathory may also refer to:

- Báthory (surname)
- Bathory (band), an influential Swedish extreme metal band
  - Bathory (album), the band Bathory's debut album
- Báthory (film), a film based on the life of Elizabeth Báthory

== See also ==
- Batory (disambiguation)
