= Arasan, Kazakhstan =

Arasan Арасан
- Village
- Location in Kazakhstan
- Coordinates: 45°16′41″N 79°21′18″E
- Country: Kazakhstan
- Region: Jetisu Region
- District: Aksu District

Population (2009)
  - Total: 1,758
- Time zone: UTC+6 (Omsk Time)
- Postal code: 040104
- Area code: 72841

Arasan (Kazakh: Арасан, Arasan) is a village in Jetisu Region of south-eastern Kazakhstan.
