= ORP Batory =

Polish Border Guard patrol boat

Coordinates: 54.51571163456483°N 18.547828399737°E

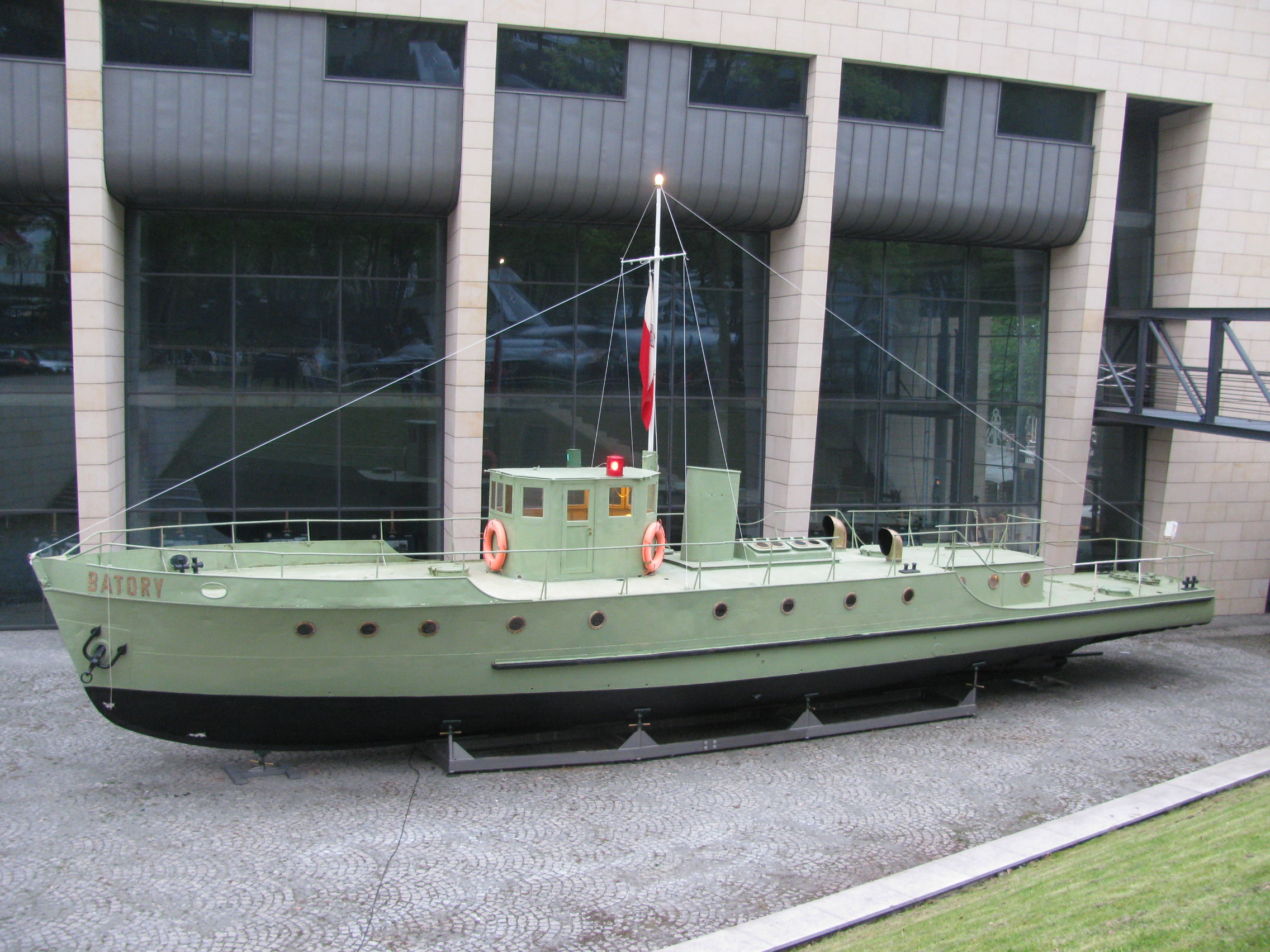
- ORP Batory on display outside the Gdynia museum

History

Poland
- Name: ORP Batory
- Namesake: Stefan Batory
- Launched: 23 April 1932
- In service: 23 June 1932
- Out of service: 1 October 1939
- Decommissioned: December 1957
- In service: 1945
- Out of service: 1969
- Status: Museum ship

General characteristics
- Type: Patrol boat
- Displacement: 28 LT (26.3 LT as built)
- Length: 21 m (68 ft 11 in)
- Propulsion: 2 × petrol engines, 550 hp (410 kW) 1 x diesel engine, 175 hp (130 kW)
- Speed: 24.3 knots (45.0 km/h; 28.0 mph)
- Range: 245 nmi at 11 knots 145 nmi at 24 knots
- Complement: 10
- Armament: • 2 × MG 08 machine guns

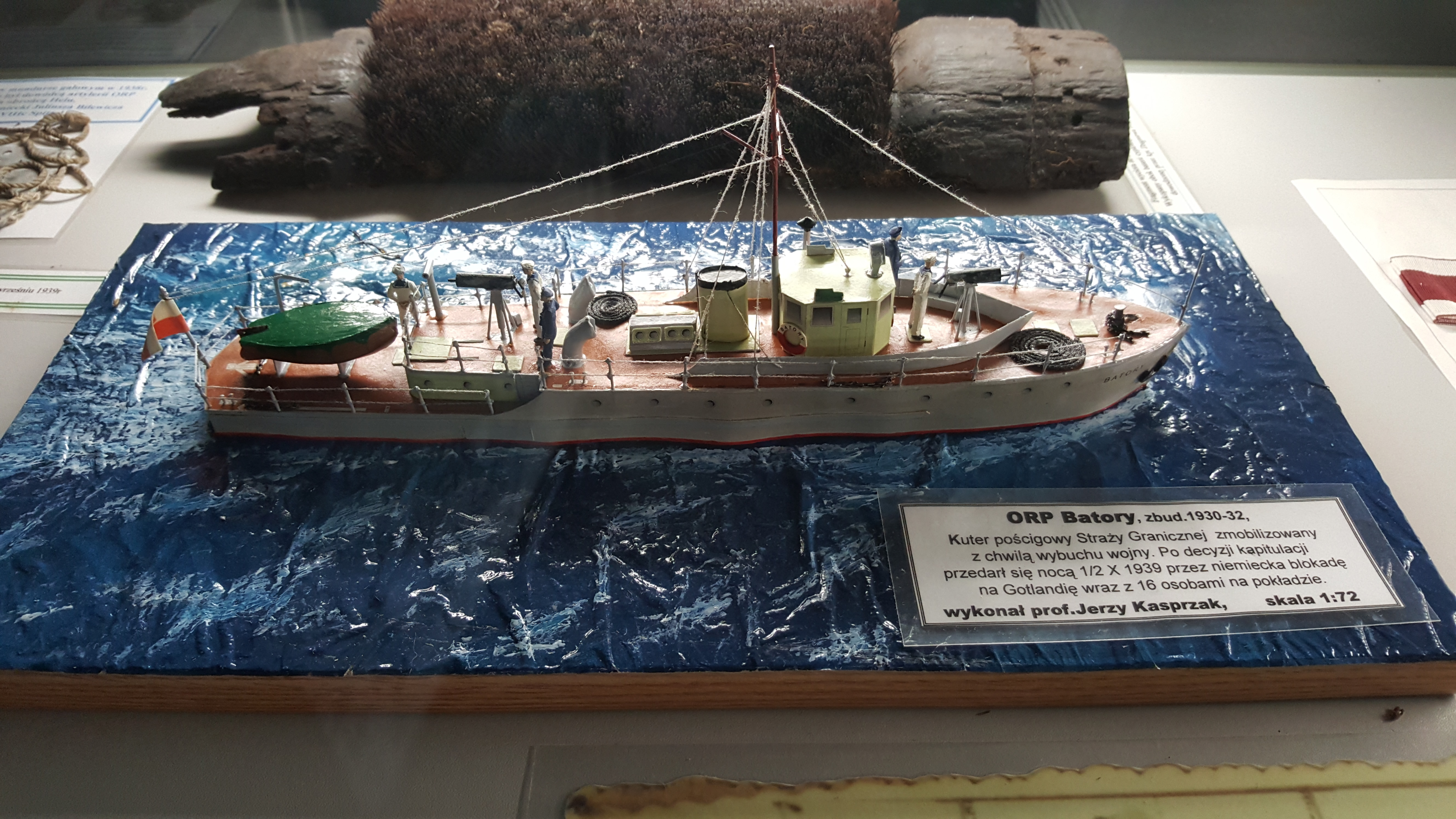
ORP Batory model at Schleswig-Holstein Battery located at Hel.

ORP Batory was a patrol boat of the Polish Border Guard which operated from the 1930s into the 1950s.

== Service history ==
The vessel was built by the State Engineering Works shipyard in Modlin, launched on 23 April 1932, and entered service with the Border Guard exactly two months later at Hel in the Baltic Sea. Her main task was to suppress smuggling in Gdańsk Bay. She was the biggest and fastest vessel of the Border Guard, classified also as "pursuit cutter" (kuter pościgowy).

During the German invasion of Poland, the vessel was mobilized into the Polish Navy, and fought in defence of the Hel Peninsula, repelling air attacks on the port of Hel, and ensuring the maintenance of communication with the base in Gdynia. On 10 September the boat was disarmed, and the crew incorporated into the defenders of the peninsula.

Just after nightfall on 1 October, on the eve of the surrender of the Hel Peninsula, the crew, taking advantage of a thick fog, escaped across the Baltic to neutral Sweden. There, they and their boat were interned, not returning to Poland until 24 October 1945. Batory returned to Border Defence Army service.

After the war, she was initially named Hel (town of Hel). In the Stalinist period she was renamed to 7 Listopada ("7th November", a date of the October Revolution), then Dzierżyński (Felix Dzerzhinsky). Finally, she was given a neutral designation KP-1 (for Kuter Patrolowy – Patrol Boat 1). In 1949 she captured a West German fishing boat on the Polish waters, commissioned next to the Polish Border Defence Army as DP-53. In December 1957 the KP-1 was decommissioned and given to the paramilitary organization Liga Przyjaciół Żołnierza (Soldier's Friends' League).

From 1959 she served as a training and rescue vessel of the LPŻ on the Vistula in Warsaw, and next – of the new paramilitary organization Liga Obrony Kraju (Home Defence League) on Zegrze Reservoir, under a name KP-1 Batory. She was withdrawn from service in 1969. Luckily, the Batory avoided scrapping, and in the 1970s she was placed on a monument in Hel naval base (not available for public). The hull and superstructure however were lacking equipment. Only in December 2009 she was given to the Polish Navy Museum in Gdynia, where she is going to be restored.
