= Ronald Batory =

American railroad industry executive (born 1950)

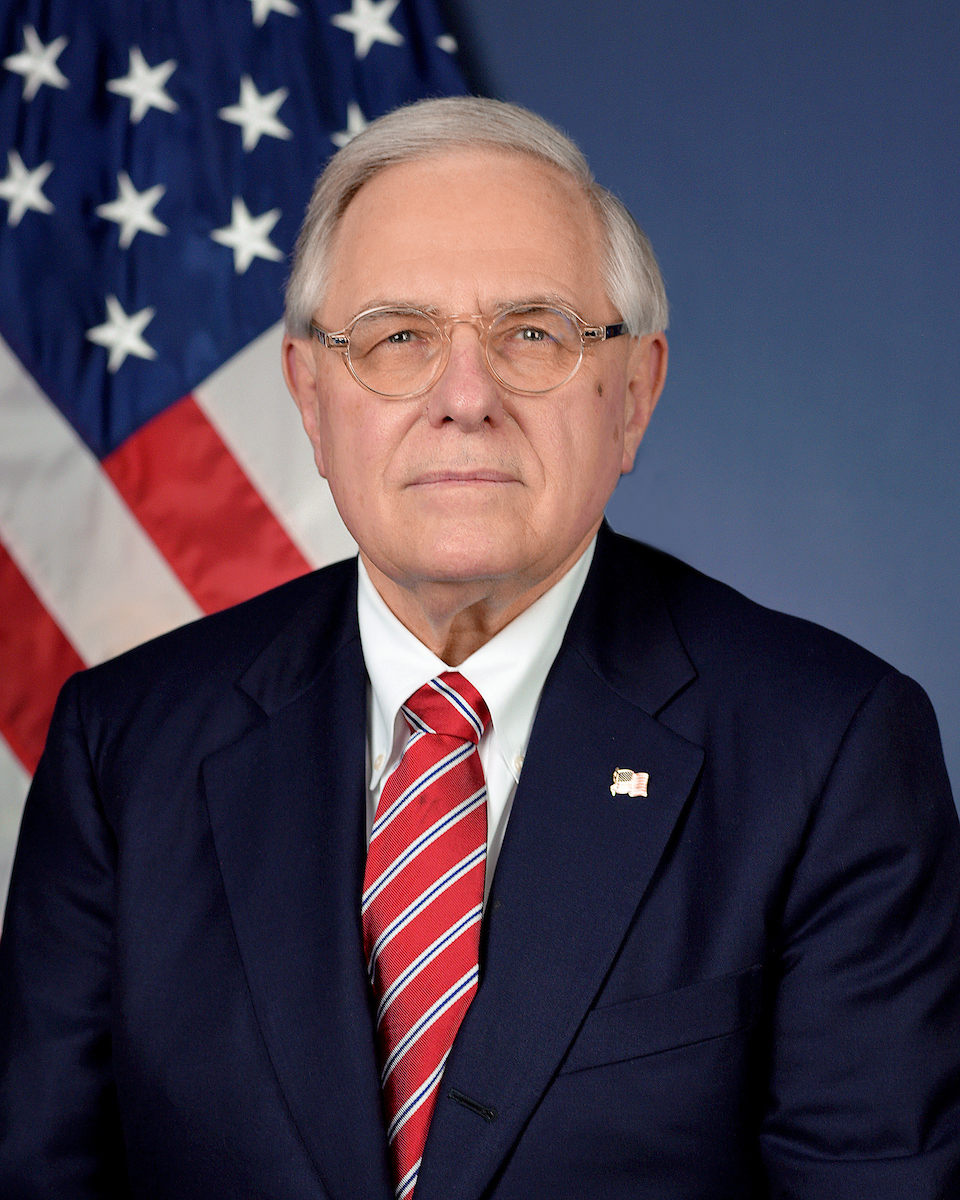

Member of the Amtrak Board of Directors
- Incumbent
- Assumed office December 21, 2024
- President: Joe Biden; Donald Trump

Administrator of the Federal Railroad Administration
- In office February 28, 2018 – January 20, 2021
- President: Donald Trump
- Preceded by: Sarah Feinberg
- Succeeded by: Amit Bose

Personal details
- Born: January 25, 1950 (age 76) Detroit, Michigan, U.S.
- Education: Adrian College (BA); Eastern Michigan University (MA)

Ronald L. Batory (born January 25, 1950) is an American railroad industry executive who served as the Administrator of the Federal Railroad Administration from 2018 to 2021. Batory has over 45 years of leadership experience in the railroad industry, including serving as president and chief operating officer of Consolidated Rail Corporation and as president of the Belt Railway of Chicago. According to a 2012 Fred Frailey article, "all Ronald Batory has ever wanted to do is work for a railroad."

== Early life and education ==
Batory was born in Detroit, Michigan, the son of a New York Central Railroad car checker and union leader. He earned a B.A. in business at Adrian College and an M.A. in industrial management from Eastern Michigan University. His father urged him not to "waste a college education on a railroad."

== Career ==
=== Railroad industry ===
In 1971, Batory took his first job as a traveling auditor in freight car accounting for the Detroit, Toledo and Ironton Railroad (DT&I). Batory rose through the ranks at DT&I, working as a traveling auditor, administrative assistant to the vice president of operations, assistant engineer of the Flat Rock, Michigan track system, industrial engineer manager, and director of material procurement and planning. When Grand Trunk Western Railroad bought DT&I, Batory became a transportation supervisor in Pontiac, Michigan, trainmaster in Toledo, Ohio, terminal manager and district operations manager in Chicago, and director of transportation planning in Detroit. In 1987, he became general manager of Chicago, Missouri and Western Railway.

Batory later joined Southern Pacific Transportation Company as general manager of its central region. From 1994 to 1998, he served as president of the Belt Railway of Chicago. He joined Consolidated Rail Corporation in 1998, serving as vice president for operations and then as president and chief operating officer from 2004 until April 1, 2017, when he retired.

=== Federal Railroad Administration ===
In July 2017, Batory was nominated by President Donald Trump to become the next Administrator of the Federal Railroad Administration. Railway Age's Jim Blaze wrote that Batory's nomination "is a creative move to bring fresh technical, business, operational and safety oversight to the FRA's important regulatory oversight position." Batory was confirmed by the Senate as Administrator of the Federal Railroad Administration on February 13, 2018. He left office on January 20, 2021. Later in 2021 he became board member of the East Broad Top Foundation, which owns and operates the East Broad Top Railroad.

=== Amtrak ===
On May 2, 2024, United States president Joe Biden announced that he would nominate Batory and Elaine M. Clegg to Amtrak's board of directors.
