= Free Nations League =

International organization

- Лига Cвободных Наций
- Logo

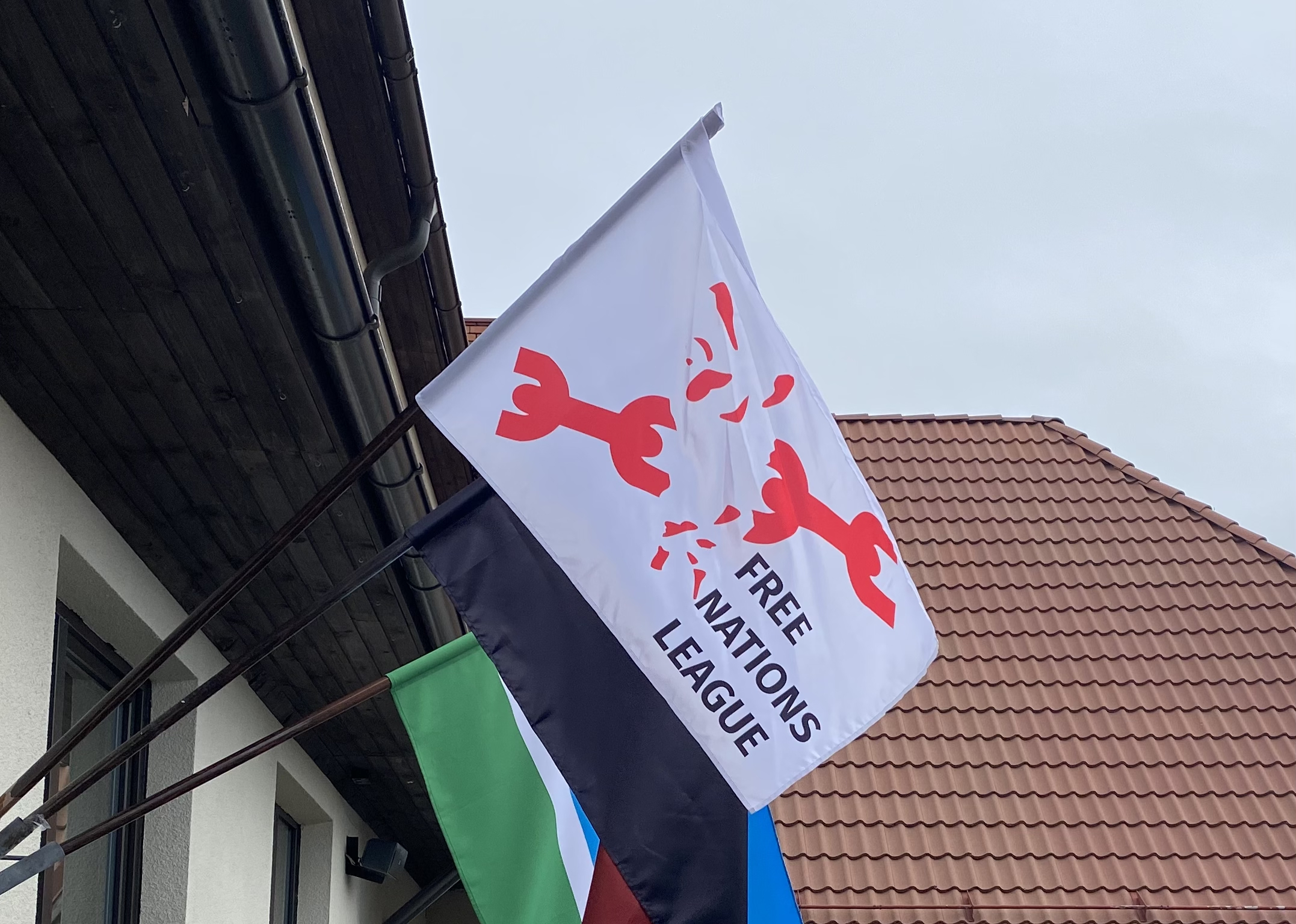
- Flag of the Free Nations League
- Formation: 2022; 4 years ago
- Founded at: Otepää, Estonia
- Type: NGO
- Legal status: Political pressure group
- Purpose: Secession of ethnic republics (countries) and other regions from the Russian Federation
- Headquarters: Helsinki, Finland
- Region served: Russia
- President: Radjana Dugar-DuPonte
- Website: freenationsleague.org

The Free Nations League is an organization that claims to represent 15 national separatist movements within Russia. The organization was founded in 2022 in the aftermath of the start of the Russian Invasion of Ukraine.

== History ==
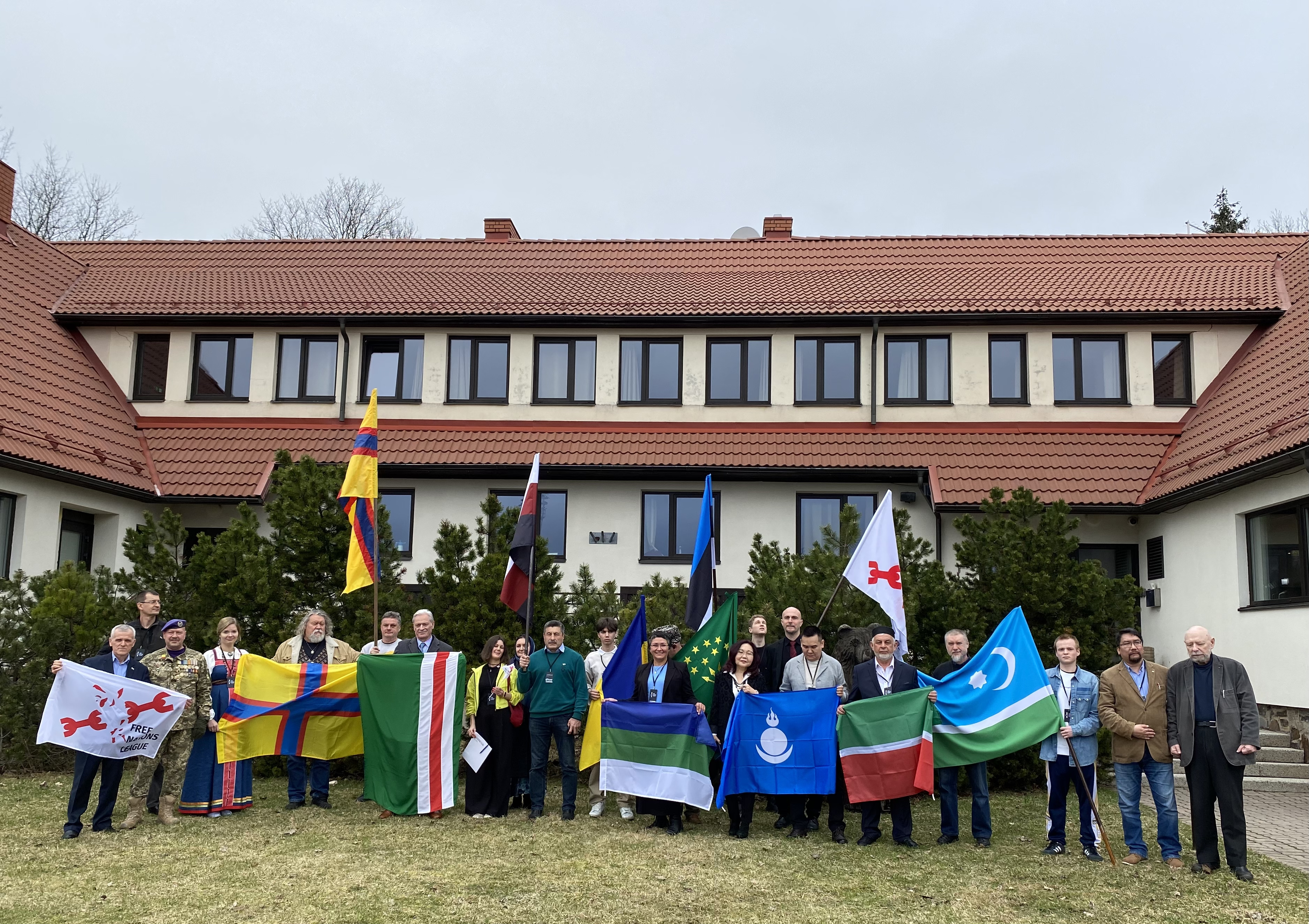
Participants at the 2024 founding congress

The group's stated goal is to provide "a broad anti-imperial movement that unites national, socio-political and civil organizations who advocate for sovereignty for the peoples and territories in the Russian Federation." The organization differentiates itself from other groups by explicitly calling for secession from the Russian state. The president of the League, Radjana Dugar-DuPonte urged the citizens of the Russian Federation to prepare for the collapse of the state stating "We cannot say exactly when that moment will come, but we know that it is no longer over the mountains. And we must be ready for it."

The group held its first congress from 4–6 April 2024, in Otepää, Estonia, where the League adopted its charter, principles and values as well as plan for the following years. The League announced that it plans to be headquartered in Helsinki with permanent offices in the Baltic states.

The group states that the ethnic republics in Russia are "captive nations" that have had their sovereignty taken from them by Russian authorities by force or threat of force.

The organization was recognized as "undesirable" on the territory of Russia.

=== Activities ===
The group sponsors the annual "Captive Nations Week" where members of the various ethnic groups diaspora protest in major cities across the western world. During the 2024 Captive Nations Week, the congress sent a letter to U.S. President Joe Biden requesting support for the independence of national minority regions in Russia, and for more support for Ukraine in its war against Russia.

== Represented groups and peoples ==
- Baltic Russians - Baltic Republican Party
- Bashkirs - Bashkir National Political Center
- Buryats - Buryat Democratic Movement
- Chechens
- Circassians
- Cossacks
- Erzyas - Erzya National Movement
- Ingrians - Free Ingria
- Kalmyks - Oirat-Kalmyk People's Congress
- Mokshas - The Committee of Representatives of the Moksha People
- Yakuts
- Tatars - Free Idel-Ural (Note: Free Idel-Ural also strives for the independence of Bashkortostan, Chuvashia, Mari El, Mordovia, and Udmurtia)

== See also ==
- NOMAD Unit (Ukraine)
- Free Nations of Post-Russia Forum
- Separatism in Kazakhstan
- Separatism in Uzbekistan
- Russian Far East
- Far Eastern Republic
- Siberian regionalism
