= Baitik Batyr =

Kyrgyz politician

- Kyrgyz: Байтик баатыр
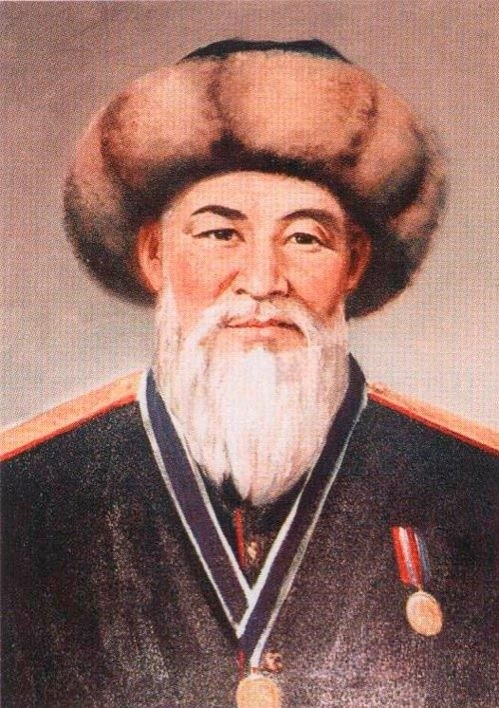
- Born: 1823; Chüy Valley
- Died: February 5, 1886
- Occupation: Russian army captain
- Known for: One of the initiators of the entry of the Kyrgyz into the Russian Empire
- Children: 7 (Including Baisil)
- Father: Kanay Batyr

Baitik Batyr (Kyrgyz: Байтик баатыр) (c. 1823, Chüy Valley — 1886) was a Kyrgyz politician of the 19th century who defended the demands of the Kyrgyz people from the Khanate of Kokand, but at the same time supported the aggressive campaigns of the neighboring Russian Empire in the Chüy Valley.

== Biography ==
=== Childhood ===
Baitik was born in 1820in the Chüy Valley of modern Kyrgyzstan. He was one of nine sons from the third wife of Kanai Batyr, the leader of the Solto tribe.

Baitik's childhood fell on the beginning of the Kokand expansion. He personally saw the arbitrariness of foreigners, the discontent of his relatives and friends. Baytik grew up as a proud, resolute, strong-willed and courageous young man. He was tall and broad-shouldered.

Baitik was the organizer of all kinds of children's games, races on young bulls, wrestling and other competitions. With his activity and leadership qualities, he drew the attention of his father and the aqsaqals of the tribe.

Kanai Batyr died when Baitik was only 15 years old. Further formation of him as a person was under the influence of his paternal uncle Jangarach Biy, to whom the leadership of the Solto tribe passed.

=== Adult life ===
By the beginning of the 60s of the 19th century, the rivalry between the Russian Empire and the Khanate of Kokand for influence in Central Asia intensified. At this time, the Kokand people intensively began to strengthen their fortresses in the Kyrgyz lands. So, in 1860, only in the Chüy Valley, they concentrated 5,000 sarbaz. The Russian troops moving south were led by Captain G.A. Kolpakovsky.

At the same time, Baitik Batyr took over the reins of power from the Solto tribe.

==== The capture of the Pishpek fortress ====
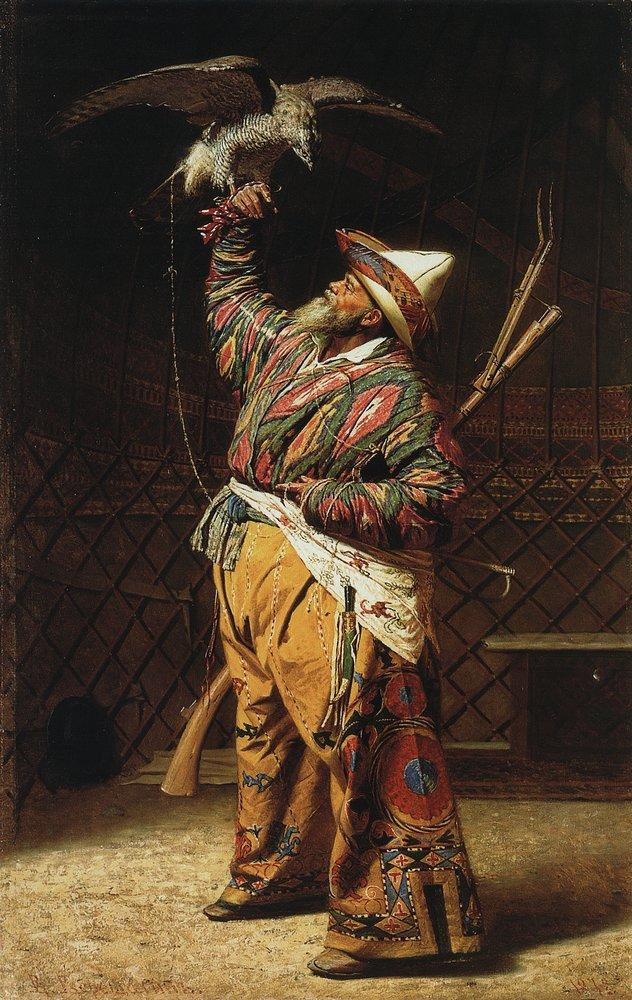
V. Vereshchagin. «A rich Kyrgyz hunter with a falcon». 1871

The separate skirmishes that took place between the Russian troops and the Kokand sarbaz revealed the advantage of Russian weapons. In the struggle against the Kokand yoke, it was reasonable for the Kyrgyz people to rely on the mighty Russian Empire. By that time, representatives of the Kyrgyz tribes Bugu and Sarybagysh were already negotiating the adoption of Russian citizenship.

Protest moods among the Kyrgyz of the Chüy Valley especially intensified after the appointment in early 1861 1861 as the governor of the Kokand Khan Rakhmatulla. He imposed additional taxes on the Solto, and held the son of Baitik Batyr Baisal as a hostage in the Pishpek fortress. Rumors about alleged bullying of his son also reached the Batyr.

All objective and subjective factors, as well as foreign policy circumstances, spoke of the brewing of a decisive battle against Kokand dominance. Rahmatullah understood this too. Baitik Batyr's invitations to take part in this or that celebration or commemoration always refused. A convenient case of reprisals against Rahmatullah presented itself only in late August — early September 1862. Having lulled the vigilance of the Kokand governor through his close circle, Baitik Batyr invited him to the feast of circumcision (Kyrgyz: Сүннөт той) in the vicinity of Pishpek. Rahmatulla arrived on that escorted by reinforced guards in the amount of 60 sarbaz. In which case, he counted on the proximity of the fortress, which was only 8-10 kilometers away.

By the beginning of the feast, Baitik prepared 500 selected horsemen led by Korchu Batyr from the Bolokbay clan, Baigazy and Kokum from the Talkan clan. By the beginning of the meal, the elastics and bridles of the entire Kokand cavalry were cut off.

On a signal given by the leader, his jigits attacked the Kokand people. Rahmatullah himself was helped by his bodyguards to escape. According to eyewitnesses, he had an excellent pacer. Faithful horseman Baitik Batyr Kokum set off after him with a lance at the ready on the famous winner of the races Ker-Kashka. Halfway to the fortress, Kokum caught up with Rahmatulla and plunged a pike into him.

In this battle, 59 sarbaz were killed. Only one managed to escape

— reported the head of the Siberian Corps, General A.O. Dugamel, in his report dated September 19, 1862 addressed to the Minister of War of the Russian Empire D. A. Milyutin.

The Kyrgyz surrounded the Pishpek fortress. Due to the fact that they were not able to take it by storm, Baitik Batyr sent his brother Satylgan to Vernyi for help. Russian troops led by Colonel G.A. Kolpakovsky arrived in early October. The siege of the fortress lasted 12 days. It was attended not only by the subjects of Baitik Batyr, who allocated 500 people daily for the destruction of the fortress, but also by the horsemen of the Sarybagysh Jantai Batyr.

==== Accession of Northern Kyrgyzstan to Russia ====
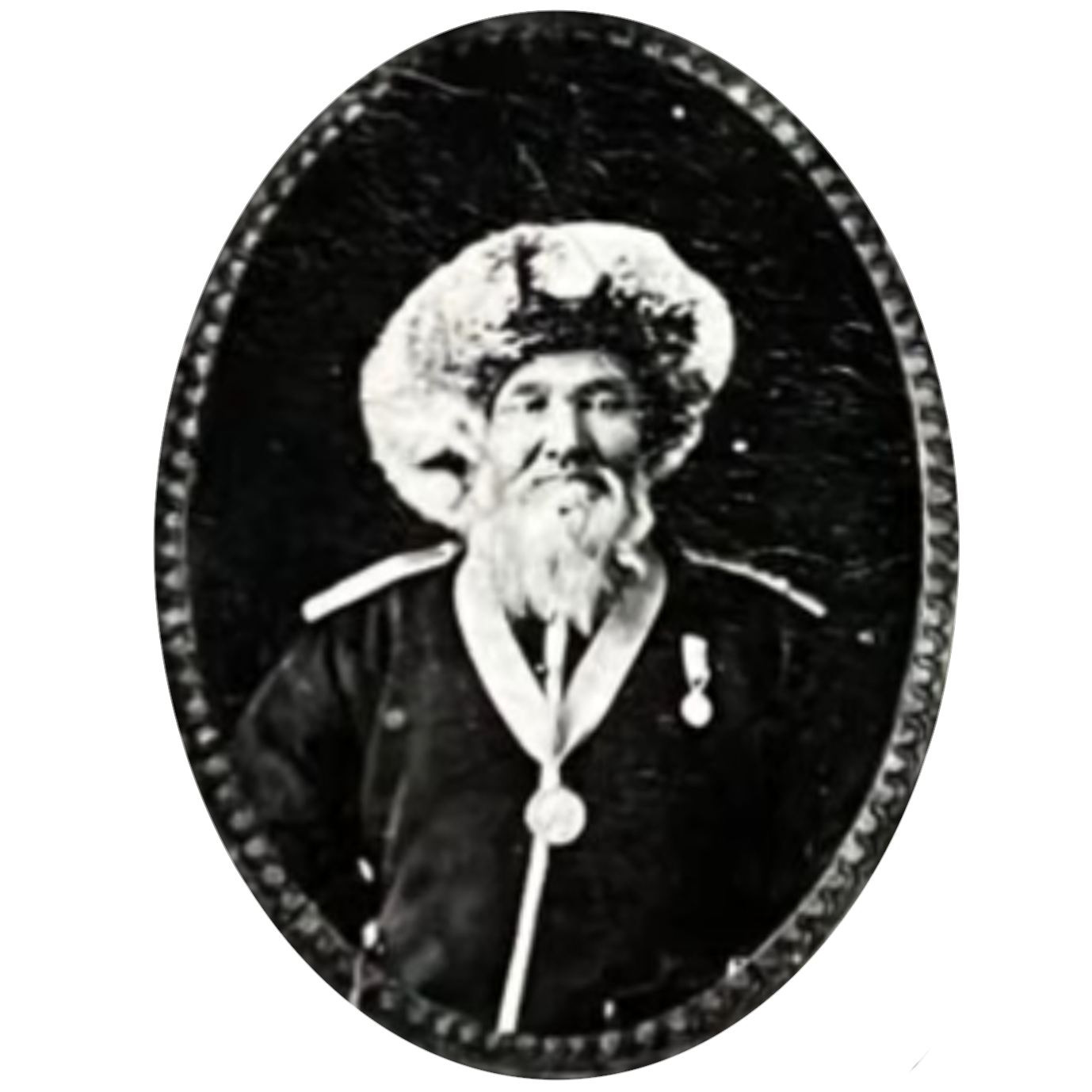
Photo-portrait of Baitik Batyr from a photo vignette, 1867

The capture of Pishpek by Baitik Batyr with the help of Russian troops was a decisive event in the course of the voluntary entry of the Kyrgyz tribes of northern Kyrgyzstan into the Russian Empire.

After the capture of the Pishpek fortress, the jigits of Baitik Batyr actively participated in the destruction of the Oluya-Ata fortress.

The decisive actions of the baatyr were also supported by his elder brothers Baiseit Batyr and Boshkoy Batyr. Communication with them was maintained by the commander of the Russian detachment in Merki, Colonel M.G. Chernyaev.

In 1867, Baitik Batyr, as part of a delegation of the peoples of Central Asia, was invited to St. Petersburg. He was given the rank of captain of the Russian army. He was awarded the Order of St. Stanislaus and a ring with a diamond.

== Political activity ==
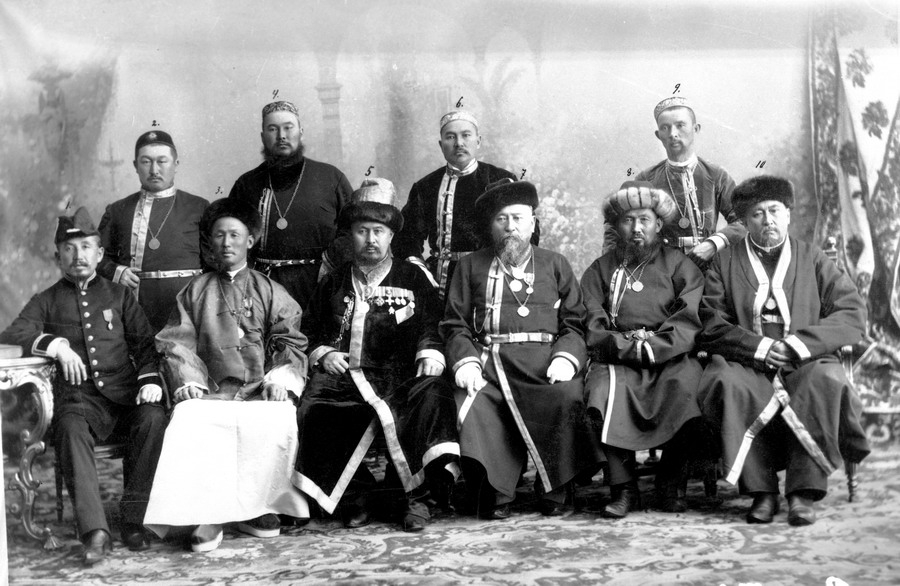
A group of Kyrgyz volost governors, Baitik Batyr sits to the right of the center, 1882

In 1862, after the entry of the Solto tribe into Russia, Baitik Batyr received the title of Senior Manap from the Russian administration. He wore it until its abolition in 1866.

In 1870, he received the position of junior assistant to the head of the Tokmak district on behalf of the population. This post was abolished in 1877.

== Legacy ==
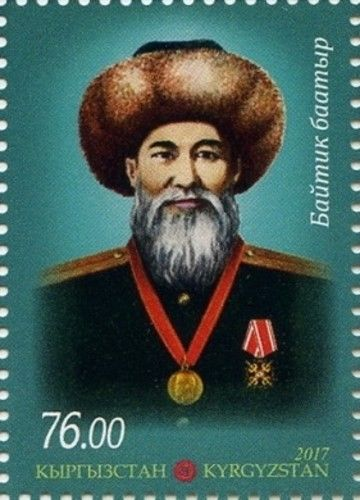
Baitik Batyr on a postage stamp of Kyrgyzstan. 2017

- In the capital of Kyrgyzstan, one of the main streets is named after him.
- The village next to the family cemetery of the descendants of Kanai Batyr bears the name of Baitik Batyr.
- The mountain next to his headquarters is also called Baitik-baspoltogu.
