= Don Batory =

American computer scientist

Don Batory is an American computer scientist. He is the David Bruton Jr. Centennial Professor #1 in the department of computer science at the University of Texas at Austin.

Don Batory was the first person to receive the most influential paper award which was established by the Software Product Line Conference in 2016
