= Oboq =

Oboqs or Oboks were Mongolian clan councils, the next step up from a family. The oboq leader, or Batur, held supreme authority during times of war but generally refrained from intervening in family matters during peacetime, unless summoned to resolve a problem. The Batur was selected based on prowess in war and administrative ability; not on seniority and kinship. Oboq councils organized raids, migrations, and hunts. They were also the court for petty crimes, such as stealing or sexual assault. Above the oboq was the khan, the overall leader of the tribe. During Genghis Khan's reign, the oboq system was reformed to create a "decimal" system. Arbans, a group of 10 parental groups, were replaced by the oboqs. 10 arbans went in a jaghun, and 10 jaghuns created a mingghan, essentially a new tribe. Mostly, Genghis Khan created minghans based on former relationships, but sometimes they were created with members of many different "rebellious" tribes.
