= Lhévinne =

Lhévinne is a surname. Notable people with the surname include:

- Estelle Gray-Lhevinne (1892–1933), American violinist and songwriter
- Josef Lhévinne (1874–1944), Russian pianist and piano teacher
- Rosina Lhévinne (1880–1976), Russian and American pianist
