= New York Industrial Home Association No. 1 =

Former American housing scheme

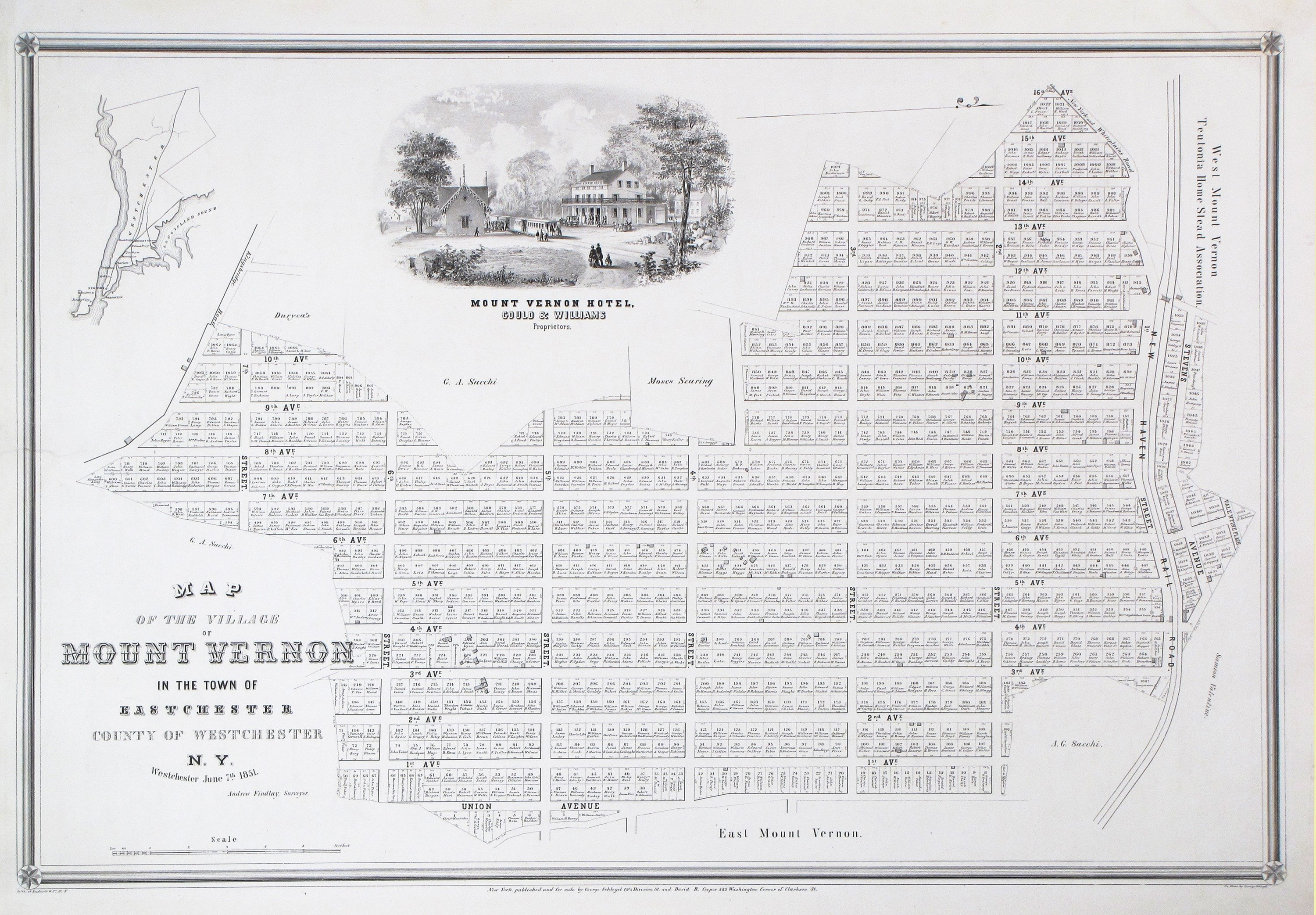
- Map of Mount Vernon, New York, in 1851
- Formation: 1850
- Members: 1017
- Leader: John Stevens

The New York Industrial Home Association No. 1 was a 19th-century cooperative association set up to allow members of the working class to purchase their own homes. The group raised enough money to purchase 369 acres (149 ha) of farmland in Westchester County, north of New York City, adjacent to the recently built railroad. The land was subdivided into 1017 one-quarter acre (0.10 ha) lots and was the nucleus for what eventually became the city of Mount Vernon.

== Background ==
The New York Industrial Home Association No. 1 was created in 1850 by John Stevens, a merchant tailor who lived in New York City, with sponsorship from Horace Greeley. Industrial home associations were a social movement growing in the mid-19th century, leading to the formation of associations devoted to freeing the working class from needing to pay rent to landlords. Stevens was a proponent of this and organized the association, which was open to "Any person of good moral character and industrious habits, who is in favor of our principles and objects".

The stated goal of the association was to attract 1000 subscribers within six months. Railroad executive Gouverneur Morris, Jr. became interested in the venture, suggesting that a good place to build would be near the intersections of the New York and Harlem Railroad (of which Morris was a director) and the New York and New Haven Railroad, in what was at the time the town of Eastchester. After considering about 100 different farms that were available for sale in Westchester County, Morris's suggested location was unanimously selected and farms belonging to Colonel John Hayward and four members of the Purdy family (Sylvanus, Andrew, and Andrew's sons John and Andrew Oscar) were acquired. (Note: Some sources state that the land purchase was made by the "Mechanics Mutual Protection No. 11".)

== Finances ==
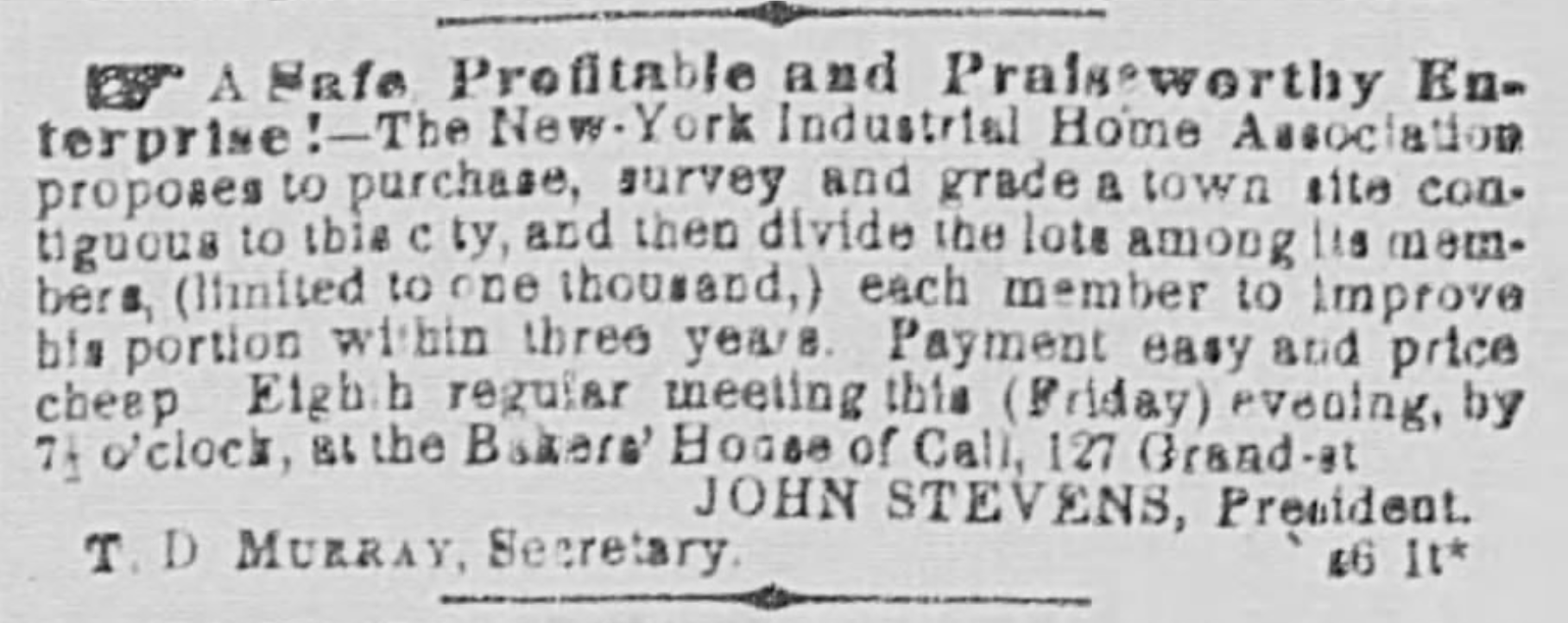
Advertisement in the New-York Tribune about the association

Members were required to pay $1 (equivalent to $39 in 2025) per week into a land fund. The association attracted 1017 members and purchased the land which would eventually become part of the city of Mount Vernon, NY, a suburb of New York City immediately north of what is now the borough of the Bronx but at the time was part of Westchester County. Five farms were purchased, totalling 369 acres (149 ha) for an aggregate cost of $75,342 (equivalent to $2,915,735 in 2025). The land was subdivided into individual building lots of one-quarter acre (0.10 ha) each, allocated one lot per member by random drawing. There were also five one-half acre (0.20 ha) lots set aside for schools and a railroad station. The area was incorporated as a village in 1854.

== Naming ==
A vote was taken to decide on a name for the new town. The leading candidates were Monticello (54 votes), New Washington (24 votes) and Stevensville (12 votes). The postal authorities rejected the winning name, as a Monticello, New York, already existed. A second vote resulted in Mount Vernon (84 votes), Fleetwood (54 votes), and Fairchester (14 votes), with Mount Vernon being selected by unanimous consent. The name Fleetwood came from a parcel of 94 acres (38 ha) which had been purchased in 1853 by John Stevens. Modern-day Stevens Avenue in Mount Vernon is named after Stevens.

== Governance ==
The Association was governed by a constitution and bylaws, which consisted of a preamble and five articles. Although the exact authorship is unknown, John Stevens probably wrote the preamble.

Whereas the industrial classes are the creators of all wealth, which has heretofore been wrested from its rightful owners by the speculative few, and then employed as a means to keep the creator in subservience to the creature, by the unholy means of speculative monopoly whereby the userpers of the soil secure to themselves great wealth by the aggregation of numbers, necessarily locating upon the land forestalled by capital for the purpose of speculation, adding great wealth thereto by and concentration, and thus the laborer becoming the pliant machine whereby the designing few work their way to wealth and aggrandisement at the expense of the toil and just rights of the many, making it necessary for the homeless to enter into combination to meet the combination of others, to obtain a restitution of their common rights, and as there is strength in union, as well as power in knowledge, we trust we have the power to unite for the purpose of securing those rights.

Under these views it is designed for one thousand individuals to unite together for the purpose of securing soil not forestalled by capital (for the purpose of speculation) sufficient for houses for said thousand – that by concentration of numbers we may secure to ourselves the increased value of property that such concentration will give, instead of casting from us the fruits of our toil and influence as we must do under the present system of things, if we combine not to protect ourselves from the unjust power and influence of capital.

Under these considerations, we each and all of use, solemnly declare that we will do all in our power to carry its laws into effect. — John Stevens, Preamble to Constitution and Bylaws

== Others ==
Other similar cooperative land ownership associations existed during this time. In 1851, the Industrial Home Association No. 2 purchased from Gouverneur Morris Wilkins about 400 acres (160 ha) in what is now the south-west Bronx. The land, on the west bank of Westchester Creek, had been used as a town commons for grazing sheep until 1825 when it was sold to a private owner, resold several times, and eventually purchased by Wilkins for $300,000 (equivalent to $9,000,000 in 2025). The Association filed plans in 1854 to build a town called Unionport. The name is still in use, referring to a subsection of the Castle Hill area of the Bronx.

There was also a "No. 3", at an unknown location.

The Teutonic Homestead Association bought 131 acres (53 ha) in Eastchester in 1852 which they named West Mount Vernon. A year later, a similar development, called Central Mount Vernon, was started on the north side of the railroad, in the roughly triangular area between the tracks, North Third Avenue, and Lincoln Avenue. West and Central Mount Vernon incorporated as a combined village in 1859, merging with Mount Vernon in 1878, which in turn was redesignated as a city in 1892.

== John Stevens House ==
At the same time that the Association purchased the five farms, Stevens purchased a house which was being constructed by Sylvanus Purdy as his own residence. The drawing of lot allocations for individual members took place in a barn which used to stand on the property. The house still stands, at 29 West Fourth Street, and is listed on the National Register of Historic Places. It was purchased by the City of Mount Vernon in 1973.
