= Edith Haines Kuester =

American composer

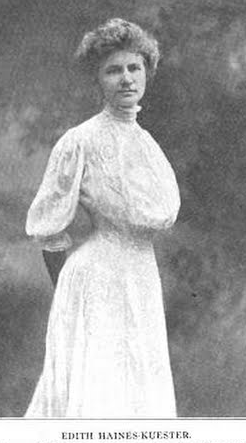
- Edith Haines Kuester, from a 1908 publication
- Born: Mary Edith Haines; May 8, 1870; Indiana, U.S.
- Died: June 6, 1956 (aged 86); San Diego, California, U.S.
- Occupations: Pianist, composer, songwriter, music educator

Mary Edith Haines Kuester (May 8, 1870 – June 6, 1956) was an American composer, songwriter, pianist, singer, and music educator.

== Early life and education ==
Haines was born in Indiana and raised in Michigan, Colorado, and California, the daughter of Henry O. Haines and Margaret Leonardson Haines. She showed musical aptitude from an early age, and studied with composer Bruno Huhn and other musicians.

== Career ==
Kuester was a concert pianist, church organist, accompanist, vocal coach, and piano teacher. She also composed music, and published a book of music for piano students. She gave a concert with singer Delia Donal Ayer and violinist Estelle Franklin Gray in Santa Fe in 1911, and a recital with her husband and pianist Olga Lieber in 1930, in Montreal.

Kuester assisted the musical director of the Panama–Pacific International Exposition in 1915. In 1920 she was the director of the Wednesday Musical Club in Burlingame, California. In 1928 she directed a musicale for the Westmount Women's Club in Montreal. In 1940 she taught classes at the Warren Conservatory of Music in Pennsylvania, where her husband was head of the voice department.

== Publications ==
- "When Love is Best" (1911, words by Ada Foster Murray)
- "Springtime of Love" (1912, sheet music)
- "Virgilia" (1915, words by Edwin Markham)
- "One Hour" (words by Edwin Markham)
- "In Helena's Garden" (song cycle, words by Richard Watson Gilder)
- "The Missive", "The Voice of June", "The Sunset Window", "The Gray Walls of the Garden", "The Sun-Dial" "Three Flowers of the Garden", "Early Autumn", and "Abendgang" (1910s, compositions)
- "Ebb Tide", "To a Yellow Pansy" (1910s, compositions)
- "The Buttercup", "Gay Daffodil", "Renunciation", "Reverie", "Secrets", "To a Rose" and "To the Crocus" (1910s, sheet music)
- "The Jewel Chain" (1928, song cycle)
- "Following the Piper"/"Sailor Dance"/"Peter's Pumpkin Shell" (1939, sheet music)
- "Tone miniatures: Twelve short pieces for piano solo" (1943, booklet)

== Personal life ==
Haines moved to New York City in 1902. She married German-born musician, concert manager, and journalist Eugene V. Kuester in 1908. The couple moved to Portland, Oregon, in 1912, then to Burlingame, California, in 1917, and they were based in Montreal in the 1920s and 1930s. By 1940 they lived in Warren, Pennsylvania. She died in 1956, at the age of 86, in San Diego, California.
