= Adelaide Gescheidt =

American singer

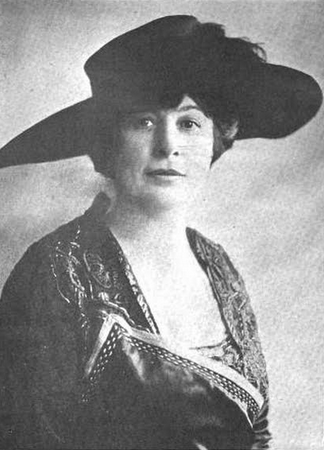
- Adelaide Gescheidt, from a 1922 publication
- Born: Mary Adelaide Gescheidt; February 16, 1877; Mount Vernon, New York
- Died: September 18, 1946 (aged 69); New York City
- Occupation(s): Voice teacher, clubwoman

Mary Adelaide Gescheidt (February 16, 1877 – September 18, 1946) was an American voice teacher, writer, and clubwoman, based in New York City.

== Early life ==
Gescheidt was born in Mount Vernon, New York, the daughter of Albert F. Gescheidt and Mary Steurer Gescheidt. Her father was a businessman; all her grandparents were born in Germany.

== Career ==
Gescheidt was a concert and church soprano in the early 20th century. She studied singing with John Dennis Mehan and Bruno Huhn. The composer and pianist Edith Haines Kuester was her piano teacher and vocal coach. In 1907-1908 she was the paid resident soprano soloist at Willis Avenue Methodist Episcopal Church in the Bronx. In 1910 she performed Haines Kuester's song cycle In Helena's Garden (words by Richard Watson Gilder) in a concert performed at Crouse College during the convention of the New York State Music Teachers Association with the composer as her accompanist.

Gescheidt injured her neck in a fall, ending her performing career. After that, she was a vocal coach who worked with opera and concert singers from her studio at Carnegie Hall. Her specialty, advertised as "Miller Vocal Art-Science", involved training and rehabilitating speaking and singing voices damaged by injury, illness, or other defects, in collaboration with throat specialist Frank E. Miller. She wrote about her work in a pamphlet that later became a book, Make Singing a Joy (1930, with a foreword by musicologist Sigmund Spaeth). She emphasized that singing naturally, without excessive training or force, produces a pleasing sound and preserves the voice from strain. Her notable students included actress Betty Blythe and oratorio singer Richard Crooks.

Gescheidt was active in the National Federation of Music Clubs, especially on a committee to promote quality music in film scores.

== Personal life ==
Gescheidt died in a hospital in New York City in 1946, at the age of 69.
