= Florence Wickham =

American opera singer (1880–1962)

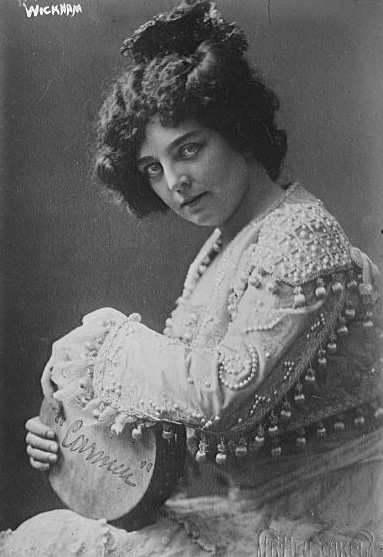
- Born: Florence Pauline Wickham; 1880; Beaver, Pennsylvania, U.S.
- Died: October 20, 1962 (aged 81–82)
- Education: Beaver College
- Occupations: Operatic contralto; Composer

Florence Pauline Wickham Lueder (1880 – October 20, 1962) was an American composer and contralto who made an international career at major opera houses such as the Metropolitan Opera in New York City. After retiring from the stage, she composed several ballets and operettas.

== Life and career ==
Florence Pauline Wickham was born in 1880 in Beaver, Pennsylvania. She was the daughter of a superior court judge. She studied music at Beaver College, graduating with a gold medal for excellence in music. An uncle financed her education after her father's death. She studied further with Alice Groff in Philadelphia, and in Berlin with Lilli Lehmann, Mathilde Mallinger and Franz Emmerich. Later, in New York City, she studied with Bruno Huhn while working at the Metropolitan Opera.

Wickham made her stage debut as Fides in Meyerbeer's Le Prophete at the Royal Court Theater in Wiesbaden at age 20, followed by Amneris in Verdi's Aida at the Royal Theater in Munich. Henry Wilson Savage engaged her as Kundry in an American tour of Wagner's Parsifal. She performed at the Royal Opera House in London for three seasons. From 1909, she performed at the Metropolitan Opera in New York City in 22 roles in 169 performances, including several world premieres. In 1910, she was awarded a Medal for Arts and Sciences and the title of Court Singer at a concert in Berlin.

Wickham married Eberhard L. Lueder in 1911, but first continued performing and later composed under her birth name Wickham. In 1913 she shared the male role of Alan-a-Dale with actress Louise Le Baron in the comic opera Robin Hood by Reginald De Koven and Harry B. Smith. She then retired from performing and became a composer. She wrote the music and lyrics for the opera Rosalind, based on the story of Shakespeare's As You Like It which premiered at the open air Rockridge Theater in Carmel, New York, in August 1938. The premiere was sponsored by her friend Eleanor Roosevelt. Rosalind was first performed in Europe at the Volkstheater in Dresden during the winter season. Wickham wrote a second opera, The Legend of Hex Mountain, in 1957 based on the Amish of Pennsylvania. It was premiered at the Memorial Hall in Plymouth, Massachusetts.

Wickham also wrote several ballets. In 1954, three of her ballets were presented at the Chautauqua Institute in New York, Indian Summer, an early American fantasy; Musicians of Murano about a carnival in an Italian town; and Gift of Laughter, an Irish fairy tale.

Wickham received the Women's Achievement Award of the National Conference of Christians and Jews in 1950. She died on October 20, 1962, aged 82, in New York City. Her music scores and correspondence are archived at the Music Division of the New York Public Library.

== Works ==
Wickham's published works include choral pieces, songs and works for the stage:

=== Ballet ===
- Gift of Laughter
- Indian Summer
- Musicians of Murano

=== Operetta ===
- Ancestor Maker
- Legend of Hex Mountain
- Look and Long (music by Florence Wickham and Marvin Schwartz; text by Gertrude Stein)
- Rosalind
