= Craig Colorusso =

American sound artist

- Born: April 17, 1970; Mount Vernon, NY
- Occupations: sound artist, musician
- Website: https://www.craigcolorusso.com/

Craig Colorusso (born 1970) is an American sound installation artist and musician known for his public art pieces connecting to sound, light, and environment. His most prolific piece, Sun Boxes, premiered in June 2009 as part of the exhibition “Off the Grid” at the Goldwell Museum in Rhyolite, Nevada and has been installed in over thirty states across the US as well as in Doha, Qatar.

== Biography ==
Colorusso was born in Mount Veron, NY, and began playing guitar and composing in the 1980s. By the 1990s he began touring in bands and starting his own record company. Through exploring improvisation and extended techniques, he created works like Tagmusik (24-hour performance in Bethel, CT) and Maschine (a composition for instruments and off-set printing presses). Following those piece, Colorusso began investigating light and sculpture within the sound experience such as his pieces MB 89 and CUBEMUSIC and since has been commissioned to create several pieces for public parks. Colorusso spent decades in New England before moving to Northwest Arkansas where he resides with his wife and daughter in Rogers, Arkansas. In 2012, filmmaker Kevin Belli created a documentary about Colorusso's artist output titled, INSTALL.

== Works ==
- Sun Boxes
- Covered Bridge ONE
- El Segundo
- Wilson Circle
- Sound Swings
- cubemusic
- Moon Phases
- Pi
- The Tunnel
- Tagmusik
- M89
