= Mount Vernon, New York =

- City
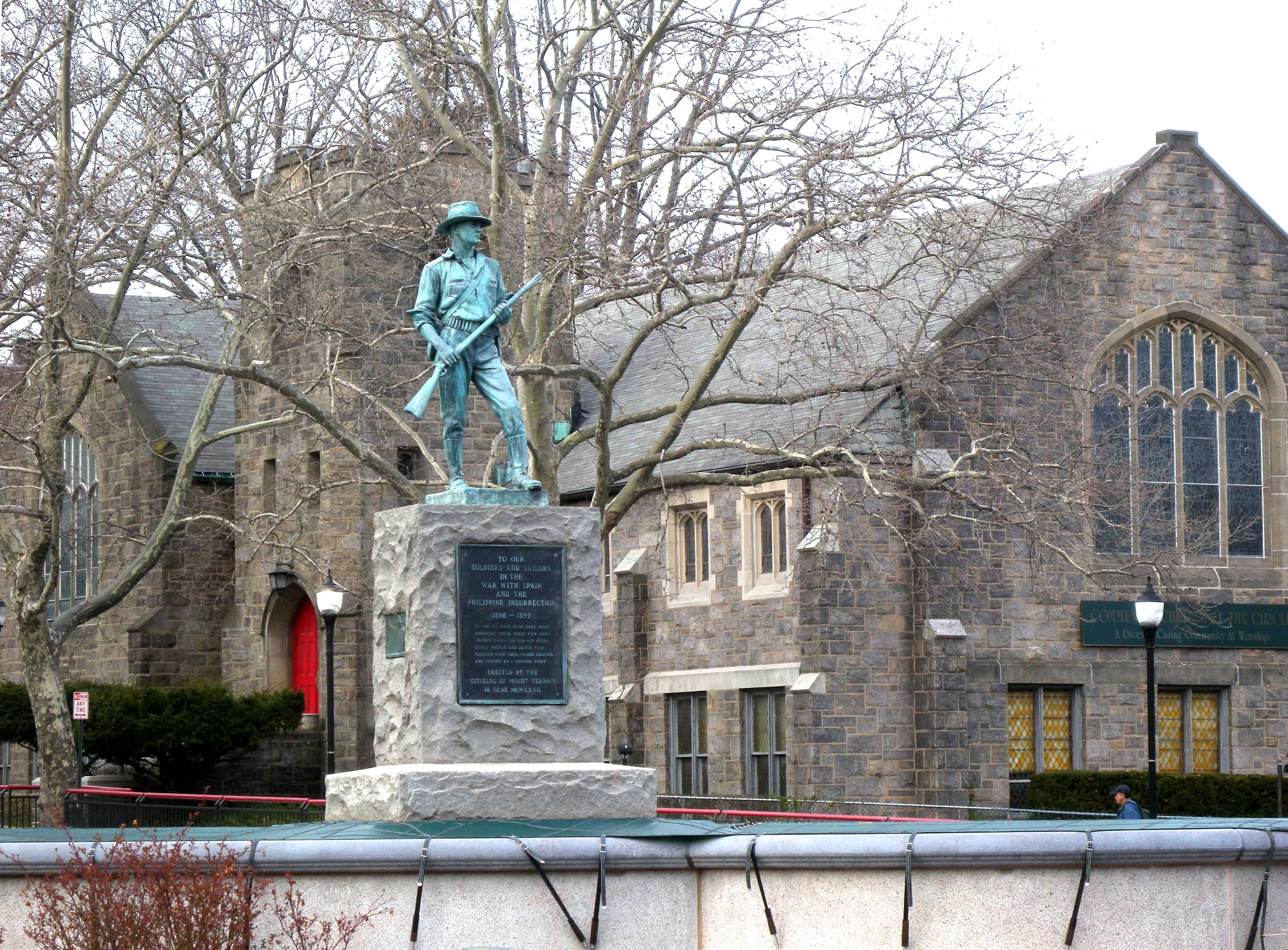
- Spanish-American War Monument and Community Church at the intersection of Gramatan and Lincoln Avenues

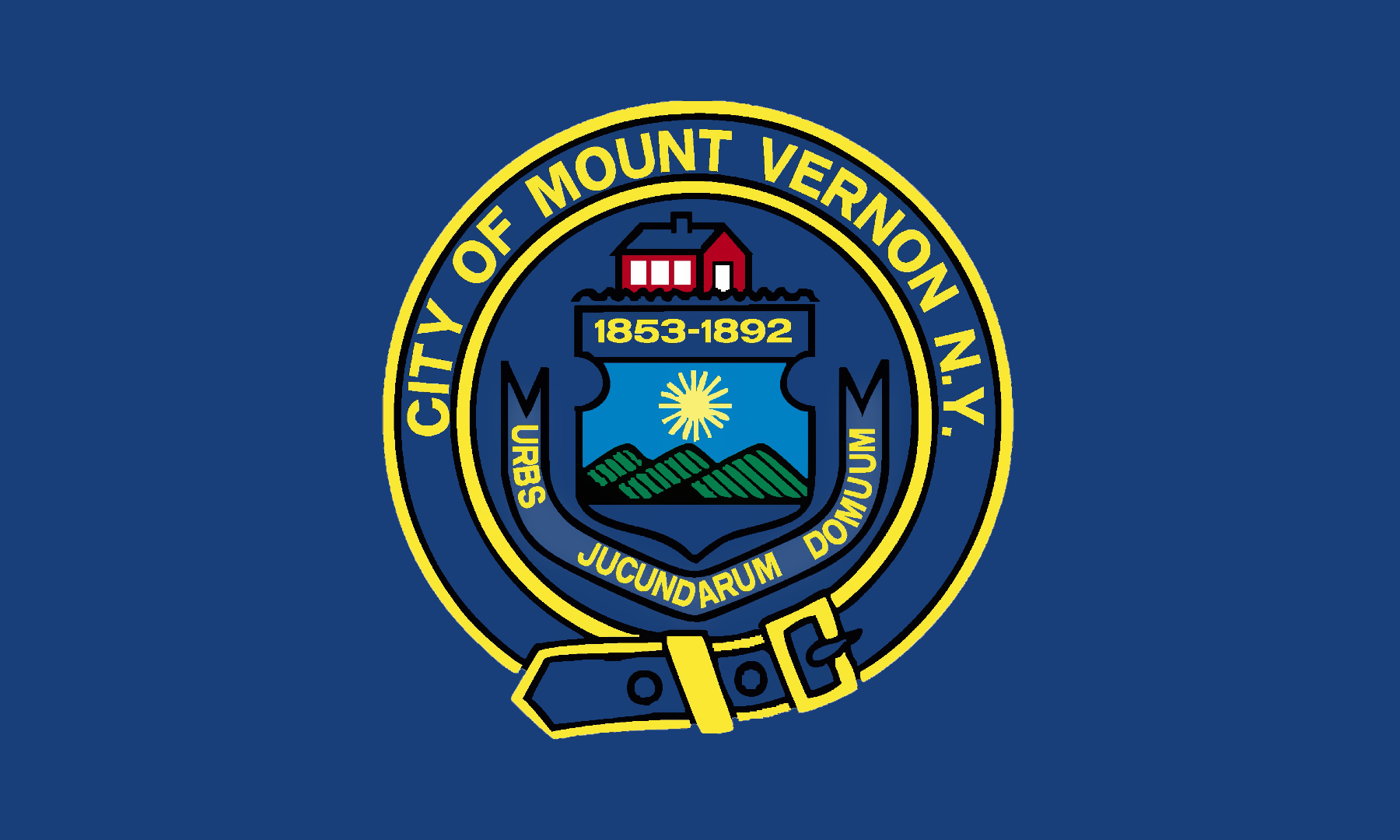
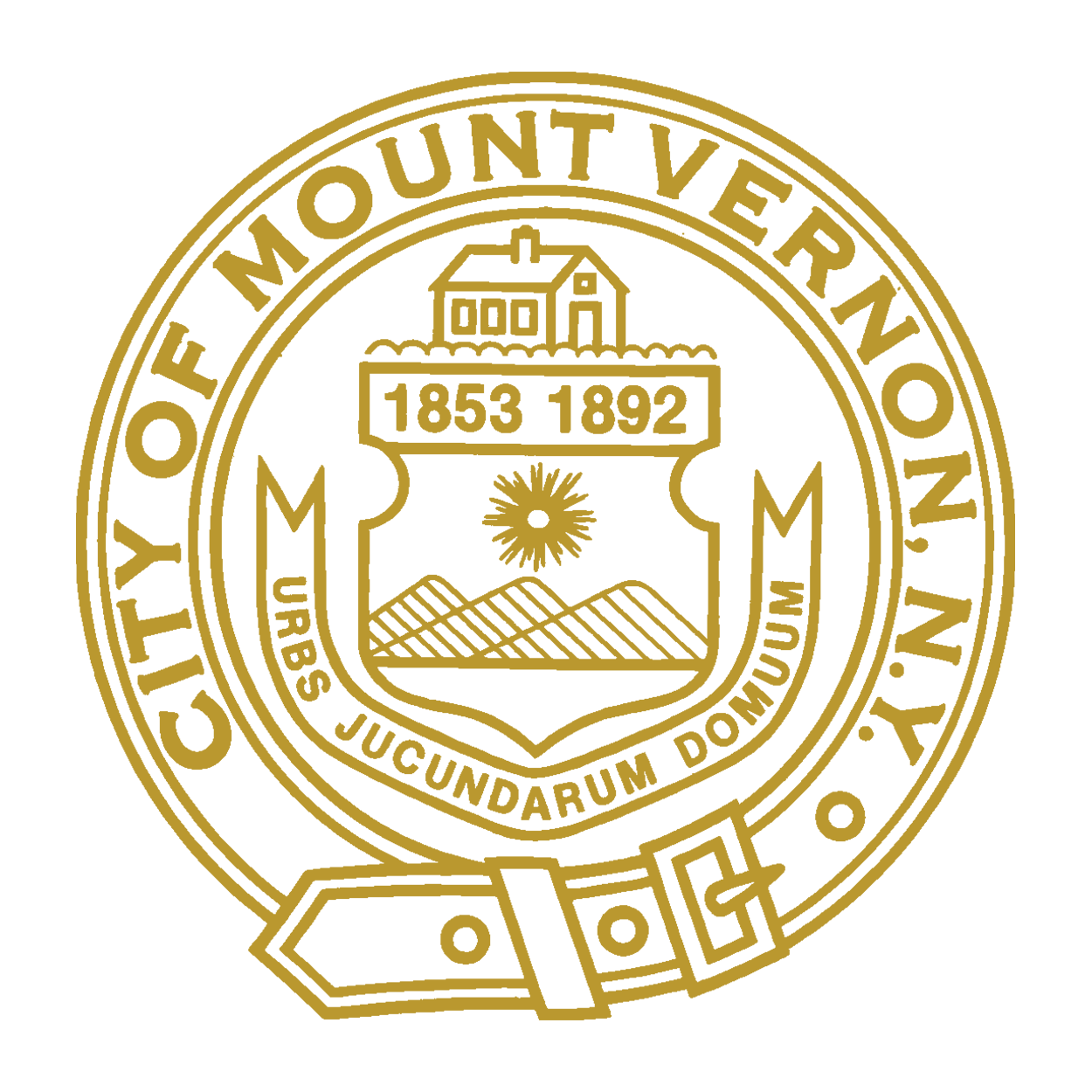
- Flag Seal
- Motto: Urbs jucundarum domuum ("City of Delightful Homes")
- Location within Westchester County and the state of New York
- Interactive map of Mount Vernon
- Coordinates: 40°54′51″N 73°49′50″W
- Country: United States
- State: New York
- County: Westchester
- Incorporated (as a village): 1853
- Reincorporated (as a city): 1892

Government
  - Type: Mayor-Council
  - Mayor: Shawyn Patterson-Howard (D)
  - City Council: Members' List: Derrick Thompson (D) President; Danielle Browne (D) President Pro Tempore; Cathlin Gleason (D) Acting President Pro Tempore; Lisa Copeland (D); Edward Poteat (D)

Area
  - Total: 4.41 sq mi (11.42 km^{2})
  - Land: 4.39 sq mi (11.38 km^{2})
  - Water: 0.015 sq mi (0.04 km^{2})
- Elevation: 108 ft (33 m)

Population (2020)
  - Total: 73,893
  - Density: 16,823.9/sq mi (6,495.76/km^{2})
- Time zone: UTC−5 (Eastern)
  - Summer (DST): UTC−4 (Eastern)
- Postal codes: 10550, 10552, 10553
- Area code: 914
- FIPS code: 36-49121
- GNIS feature ID: 0957917
- Website: mountvernonny.gov

Mount Vernon is a city in Westchester County, New York, United States. It is an inner suburb of New York City, immediately to the north of the borough of the Bronx. As of the 2020 census, Mount Vernon had a population of 73,893, making it the eighth-largest city in the state and largest African-American majority city in the state.

Mount Vernon has two major sections. South-side Mount Vernon is more urban, while north-side Mount Vernon is more residential. Mount Vernon's downtown business district is on the city's south side, which includes City Hall, Mount Vernon's main post office, Mount Vernon Public Library, office buildings, and other municipal establishments.

== History ==
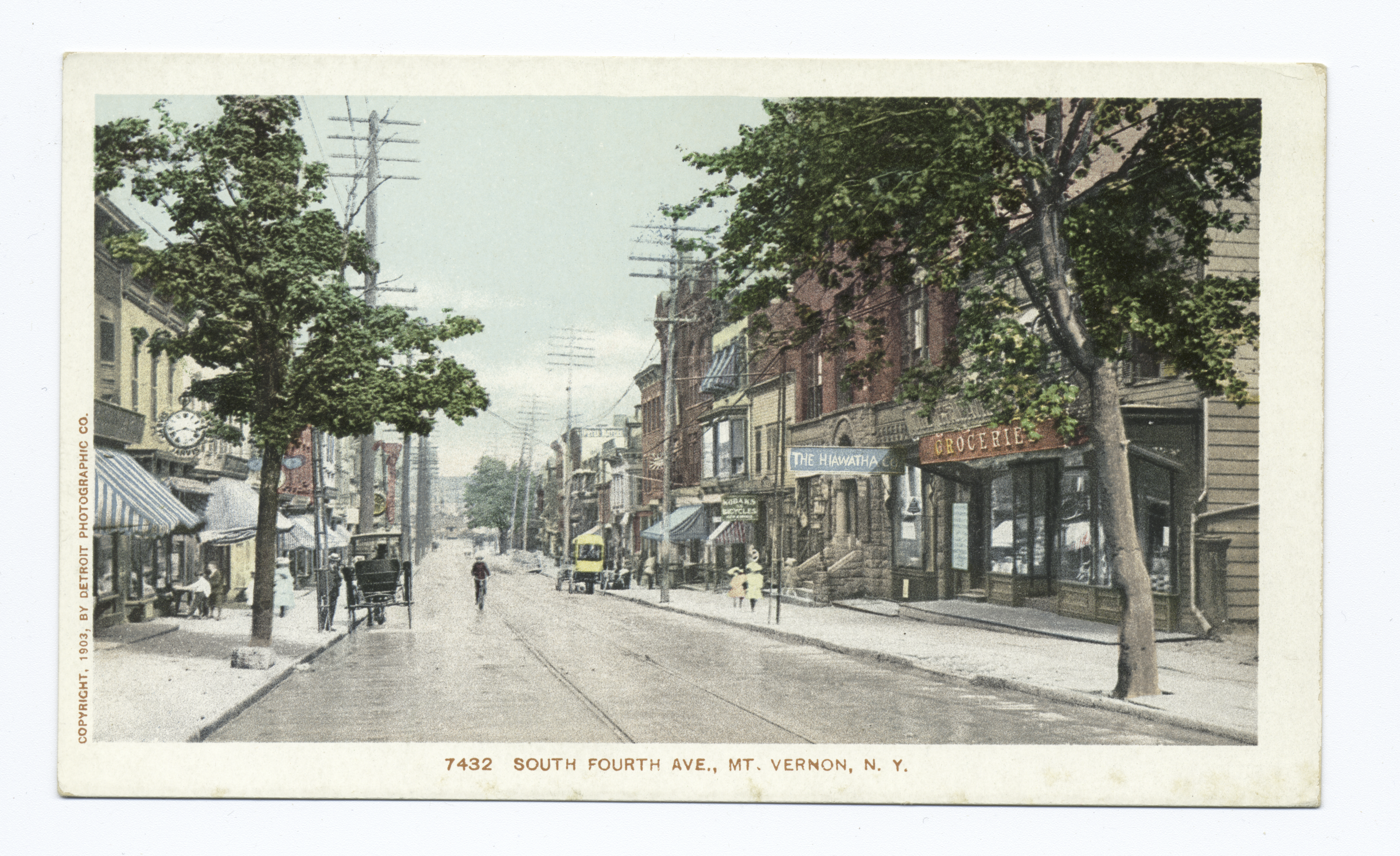
South Fourth Avenue in the 1890s

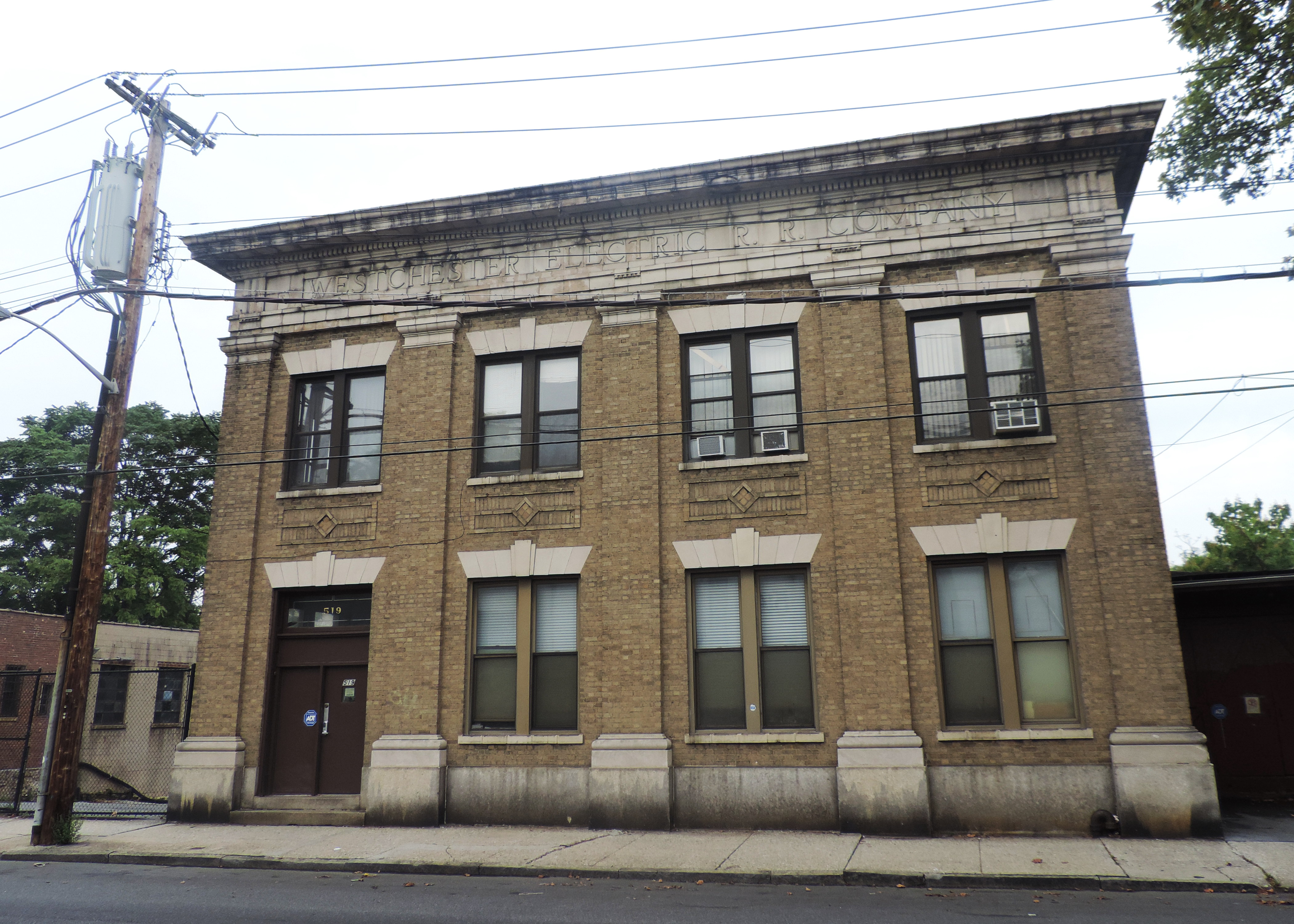
Former trolley company building, Southside

The Mount Vernon area was first settled in 1664 by families from Connecticut as part of the Town of Eastchester.

Mount Vernon became a village in 1853 and a city in 1892. Early development was driven by the New York Industrial Home Association No. 1, a home building cooperative organized to build homes for "tradesmen, employees, and other persons of small means".

Mount Vernon takes its name from George Washington's Mount Vernon plantation in Virginia, much as neighboring Wakefield (in the Bronx) was named for the Virginia plantation where Washington was born.

For many years, the Schleicher & Sons Piano Company, which was founded by Prussian immigrant Gustav Schleicher, had a factory in Mount Vernon, which was established in 1864. The company at its apex had over three factories, the company's headquarters being in Mount Vernon. Over three hundred Schleicher pianos would be in use in the town.

In 1894, the voters of Mount Vernon participated in a referendum on whether to consolidate into a new "City of Greater New York". The cities of Brooklyn (coterminous with Kings County) and Long Island City, the western towns and villages of Queens County, and all of Richmond County (present day Staten Island) all voted to join with the existing city (present day Manhattan and The Bronx). The referendum failed in Mount Vernon and the adjacent city of Yonkers, both of which remain independent cities.

The Mount Vernon Trust Company opened in 1903. It was the largest bank in Westchester County, with branches in the east and west sections of the city. The Mount Vernon Public Library, a gift to the city from Andrew Carnegie, opened in 1904. It is now part of the Westchester Library System.

By the 1960s, Mount Vernon was a racially segregated city. Black Americans from the southern United States migrated north during the Great Migration and settled in Mount Vernon for better job opportunities and educational advancements. At the same time, many white Americans from the Bronx and Manhattan moved to Mount Vernon as a result of white flight and suburbanization. Mount Vernon was divided by the New Haven Line (today part of Metro-North Railroad) into North Side and South Side. The population south of the tracks became predominantly Black, while the population north of the tracks was largely white.

At the height of the city's segregation in the 1970s, August Petrillo was mayor. When he died, Thomas E. Sharpe was elected mayor. Upon Sharpe's death in 1984, Carmella Iaboni took office as acting mayor until Ronald Blackwood was elected in 1985; Blackwood was the first Afro-Caribbean mayor of the city (as well as of any city in New York State). Ernest D. Davis was mayor from 1996 to 2007. Clinton I. Young, Jr. became the city's mayor in 2008. In 2012, Ernest D. Davis became the 21st mayor of Mount Vernon. In 2013, Davis was investigated for failure to report rental income. In 2015, Richard Thomas defeated Davis in an upset victory in the September primary. in the November general election, Thomas received 71% of the votes to become the mayor of Mount Vernon.

In the subsequent 2019 election, Shawyn Patterson-Howard unseated the incumbent Mayor Thomas in a hotly contested June primary to become the new Democratic nominee and went on to capture 81% of the vote to defeat André Wallace (who had since been named Acting Mayor and ran as a Republican) in the general election in November to become the first Black woman mayor of Mount Vernon (and of any city in Westchester County).

Mount Vernon has in recent years undergone a transition from a city of homes and small businesses to a city of regional commerce. Between 2000 and 2006, Mount Vernon's economy grew 20.5%, making it one of the fastest-growing cities in the New York metropolitan area. In 2019, Moody's withdrew its credit rating for Mount Vernon because of the city's failure to provide audited financial statements. The failure to prepare and deliver audited financial statements stemmed from a disagreement as to which entity would pay for the audit of the Urban Renewal Agency (URA), one of the city's agencies, and which auditing firm would perform the audit. Further clouding the city's financial condition was the prospect that it might have a repayment obligation to HUD in connection with grants previously awarded to the city

=== 2019 mayoral dispute ===
On July 9, 2019, mayor Richard Thomas pleaded guilty to stealing campaign funds and lying to the State Board of Elections. Thomas was ordered to resign from office by September 30, 2019. The city council then appointed council president Andre Wallace as acting mayor. Thomas refused to resign from his post. Wallace then appointed Shawn Harris as new police commissioner. After arriving for work, Thomas ordered the Mount Vernon Police to arrest Harris for trespassing. Harris was released after an order from the Westchester County District Attorney. Both Thomas and Wallace occupied offices in the city hall, with Thomas in the mayor's office, under the guard of the Mount Vernon Police. Judge Ecker ruled that Thomas had actually vacated the office of mayor on July 8, that Wallace had automatically assumed the office at that time, and that Wallace would be the acting mayor of Mount Vernon until January 1, 2020.

=== Mount Vernon Charter Revision Commission ===
In March 2019, Mayor Richard Thomas called for the formation of the Mount Vernon Charter Revision Commission, suggesting the charter was antiquated, dating to the late 19th century. In August 2019, the Commission presented its final report which included four key proposed changes to the City's Charter:

1. A new requirement for annual financial audits.
2. Quarterly financial reports showing the city's fiscal condition.
3. An updated comprehensive plan for economic growth.
4. A periodic review of the city charter.

== Notable sites ==
St. Paul's Church is designated as a National Historic Site in 1978. Other Mount Vernon sites included on the National Register of Historic Places include:

- First United Methodist Church
- John Stevens House
- Trinity Episcopal Church Complex
- United States Post Office on First Street

== Geography ==
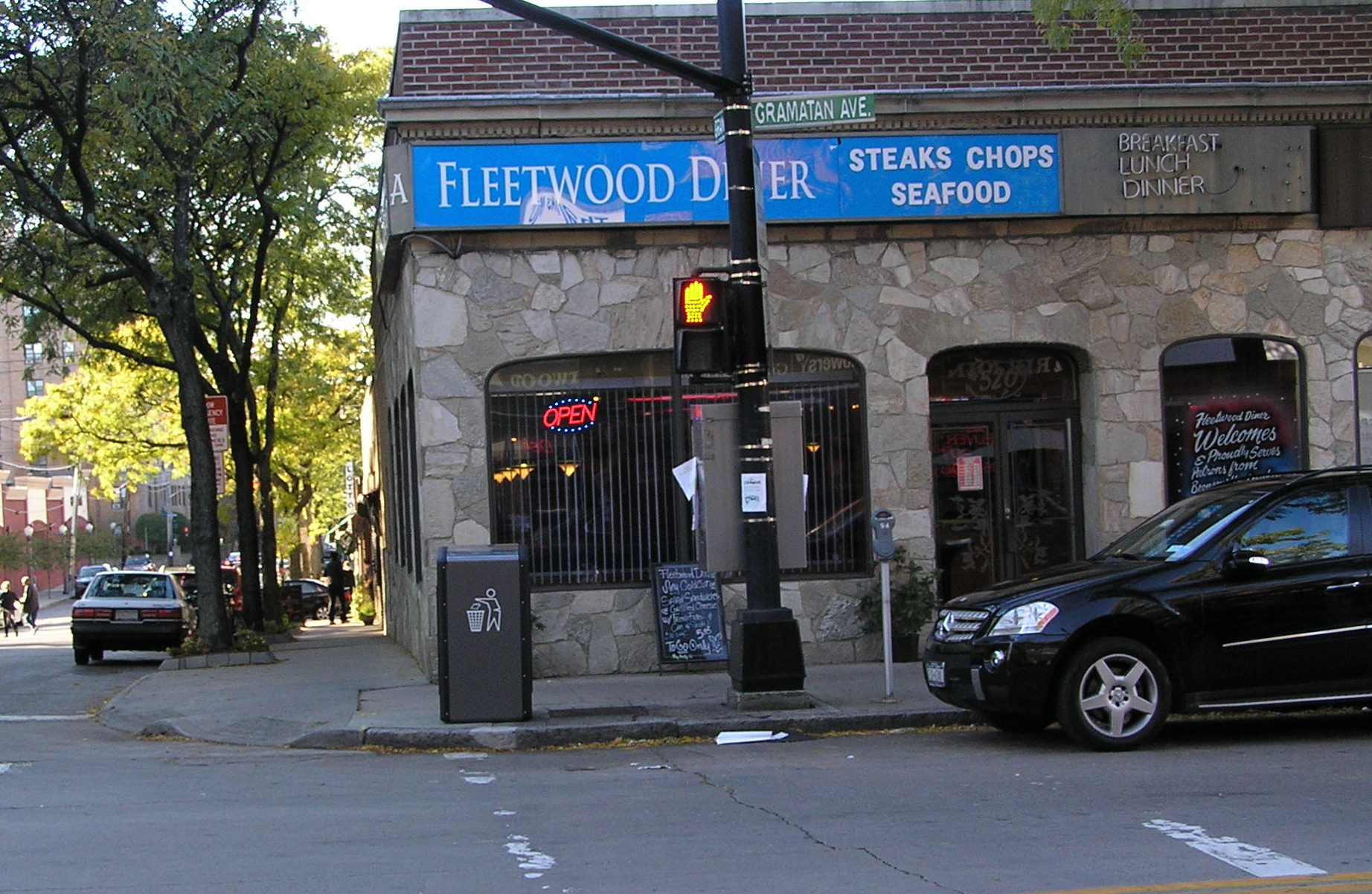
The corner of Gramatan Avenue and Grand Street in Fleetwood

=== Location ===
Mount Vernon is at 40°54′51″N 73°49′50″W (40.914060, −73.830507). It is the third-largest and the most densely populated city in Westchester County. According to the United States Census Bureau, the city has a total area of 4.4 square miles (11.4 km^{2}), of which 0.015 square miles (0.04 km^{2}), or 0.39%, is water.

Mount Vernon is bordered by the village of Bronxville and city of New Rochelle to the north, by the town of Pelham and village of Pelham Manor to the east, by the Hutchinson River and the Eastchester and Wakefield sections of the Bronx to the south, and by the city of Yonkers and the Bronx River to the west.

=== Elevation ===
Mount Vernon's elevation at City Hall is about 235 feet (72 m), reflecting its location between the Bronx River to the west and the Hutchinson River to the east. On a clear day, the Throgs Neck Bridge can be seen from 10 miles (20 km) away from many parts of the city, while at night, the bridge's lights can also be seen. The city's seal, created in 1892, depicts what were then considered the highest points in Mount Vernon: Trinity Place near Fourth Street, Vista Place at Barnes Avenue, and North 10th Avenue between Washington and Jefferson places. Since then, it was discovered that the city's highest elevation is on New York Route 22, North Columbus Avenue, at the Bronxville line.

=== Neighborhoods ===
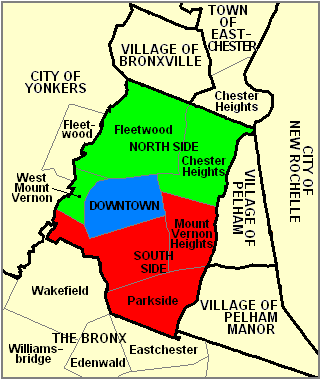
Map of Mount Vernon's neighborhoods

Mount Vernon is typically divided into four major sections in four square miles: Downtown, Mount Vernon Heights, North Side, and South Side.

==== Downtown ====
Downtown Mount Vernon features the Gramatan Avenue and Fourth Avenue shopping district (known as "The Avenue" by locals) and the Petrillo Plaza transit hub, and houses the city's central government.

Downtown is in the same condition it was 40 years ago. It features the same mid-century architecture and format. Former mayor Clinton Young vowed to make Mount Vernon a new epicenter with a new central business district. His failed plans included establishing commercial office space and rezoning to allow high density development in the downtown, as well as affordable and market rate housing.

==== Mount Vernon Heights ====
Mount Vernon Heights' highly elevated terrain has earned the moniker "the rolling hills of homes". It is home to the city's commercial corridor, along Sandford Boulevard (6th Street).

Sandford Blvd (6th Street)—also known as "Sandford Square"—is a commercial corridor which attracts residents from Mount Vernon, nearby communities in Westchester County and the Bronx as well as other locales.

Most of the commercial development in this corridor has occurred since the 1980s. The area is still undergoing revitalization to encourage economic development within this 400-acre (1.6 km^{2}) of land along and around the boulevard.

==== North Side ====
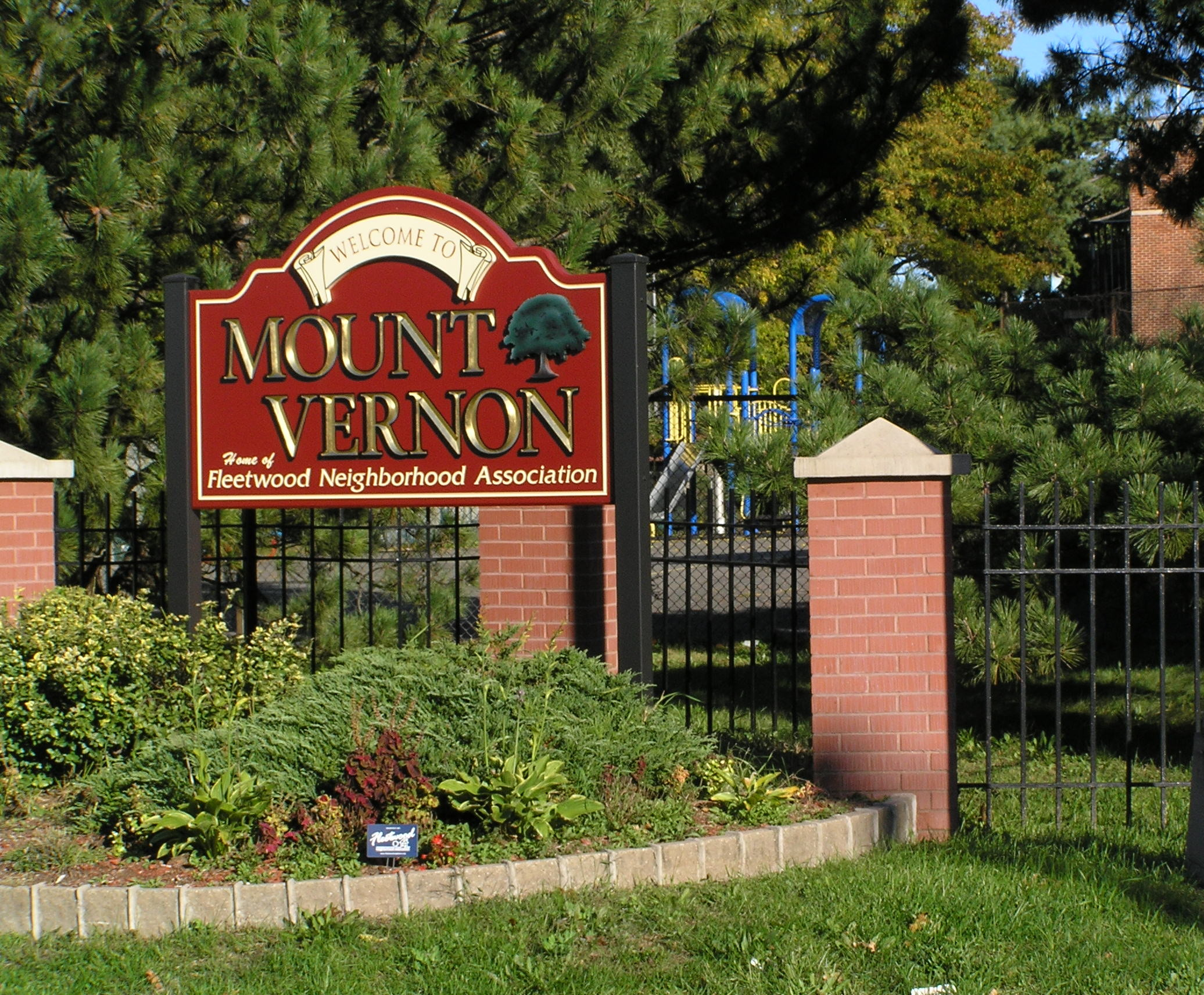
Fleetwood Welcome Sign

Mount Vernon's North Side is one of the most ethnically diverse neighborhoods in Westchester County. The northern part of the city consists of five neighborhoods: Chester Heights, Estate Manor/Aubyn Estates, Fleetwood, Huntswood, and Oakwood Heights. In Fleetwood, many large co-op buildings line the center of town, which is bisected by Gramatan Avenue.

==== South Side ====
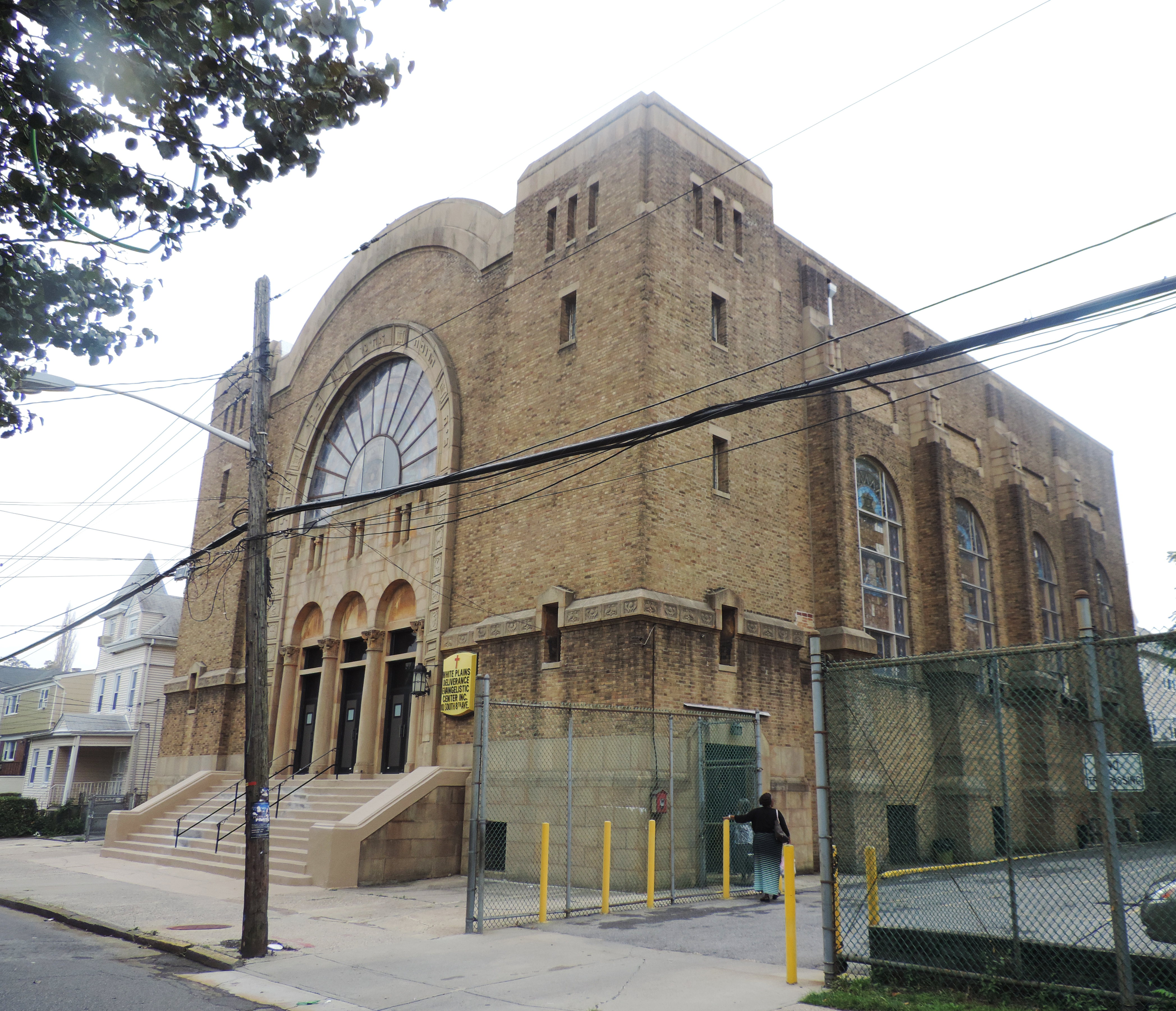
Church housed in a former synagogue on the South Side

Mount Vernon's South Side, which abuts The Bronx, resembles New York City and includes the neighborhoods Parkside, South Side and Vernon Park. Numerous industrial businesses are in Parkside, while the rest of South Side Mount Vernon features multi-family homes, apartment buildings, and commercial businesses.

South Side Mount Vernon features notable city landmarks such as Brush Park, Hutchinson Field, the Boys and Girls Club, and St. Paul's Church National Historic Site.

== Demographics ==
Historical population
Census	Pop.	Note	%±
1870	2,700		—
1880	4,586		69.9%
1890	10,830		136.2%
1900	21,228		96.0%
1910	30,919		45.7%
1920	42,726		38.2%
1930	61,499		43.9%
1940	67,362		9.5%
1950	71,899		6.7%
1960	76,010		5.7%
1970	72,778		−4.3%
1980	66,713		−8.3%
1990	67,153		0.7%
2000	68,381		1.8%
2010	67,292		−1.6%
2020	73,893		9.8%
U.S. Decennial Census; 2010 2020

=== Racial and ethnic composition ===
Mount Vernon city, New York – Racial and ethnic composition Note: the U.S. Census treats Hispanic/Latino as an ethnic category. This table excludes Latinos from the racial categories and assigns them to a separate category. Hispanics/Latinos may be of any race.
Race / Ethnicity (NH = Non-Hispanic)	Pop 2000	Pop 2010	Pop 2020	% 2000	% 2010	% 2020
White alone (NH)	16,677	12,449	9,077	24.39%	18.50%	12.28%
Black or African American alone (NH)	39,889	41,266	44,655	58.33%	61.26%	60.43%
Native American or Alaska Native alone (NH)	160	200	140	0.23%	0.30%	0.19%
Asian alone (NH)	1,433	1,206	1,398	2.10%	1.79%	1.89%
Native Hawaiian or Pacific Islander alone (NH)	36	27	21	0.05%	0.04%	0.03%
Other race alone (NH)	663	922	1,459	0.97%	1.37%	1.97%
Mixed race or Multiracial (NH)	2,440	1,670	3,140	3.57%	2.48%	4.25%
Hispanic or Latino (any race)	7,083	9,592	14,003	10.36%	14.25%	18.95%
Total	68,381	67,292	73,893	100.00%	100.00%	100.00%

=== 2020 census ===
As of the 2020 census, Mount Vernon had a population of 73,893. The median age was 39.6 years. 20.7% of residents were under the age of 18 and 15.2% of residents were 65 years of age or older. For every 100 females there were 83.0 males, and for every 100 females age 18 and over there were 78.6 males age 18 and over.

100.0% of residents lived in urban areas, while 0.0% lived in rural areas.

There were 28,286 households in Mount Vernon, of which 31.5% had children under the age of 18 living in them. Of all households, 30.1% were married-couple households, 20.4% were households with a male householder and no spouse or partner present, and 43.4% were households with a female householder and no spouse or partner present. About 31.9% of all households were made up of individuals and 12.3% had someone living alone who was 65 years of age or older.

There were 30,350 housing units, of which 6.8% were vacant. The homeowner vacancy rate was 1.8% and the rental vacancy rate was 4.0%.

Racial composition as of the 2020 census
Race	Number	Percent
White	10,367	14.0%
Black or African American	46,134	62.4%
American Indian and Alaska Native	451	0.6%
Asian	1,445	2.0%
Native Hawaiian and Other Pacific Islander	36	0.0%
Some other race	8,353	11.3%
Two or more races	7,107	9.6%

As of the 2020 census, Mount Vernon is the only incorporated place in New York State with an African-American majority.

=== 2010 census ===
As of the 2010 United States census, there were 67,292 people living in the city. The racial makeup of the city was 61.3% Black, 18.5% White, 0.3% Native American, 1.8% Asian, <0.1% Pacific Islander, 1.4% from some other race and 2.5% from two or more races. 14.3% were Hispanic or Latino of any race.

=== 2000 census ===
As of the 2000 census, 68,381 people, 27,048 households, and 18,432 families resided in the city. The population density was 14,290.3 inhabitants per square mile (5,517.5/km^{2}), with 28,558 housing units at an average density of 7,205.9 per square mile (2,782.2/km^{2}). The racial makeup of the city was 59.58% African American, 28.63% White, 10.48% Hispanic or Latino of any race, 4.85% from other races, 4.44% from two or more races, 2.12% Asian, 0.05% Pacific Islander, and 0.32% Native American. A significant proportion of the population is of Brazilian descent; Brazilians can be included in the African American, White, Multiracial and/or Latino categories. Similarly, a significant part of the Black and/or Latino population is of Caribbean origin.

There were 27,048 households, of which 40.9% were married couples living together, 31.1% had children under the age of 18 living with them, 37.2% were non-families, and 28.0% had a female householder with no husband present. 30.0% of all households were made up of individuals, and 10.7% had someone living alone who was 65 years of age or older. The average household size was 2.63 and the average family size was 3.27.

In the city, the population was spread out, with 25.3% under the age of 18, 8.3% from 18 to 24, 31.1% from 25 to 44, 22.4% from 45 to 64, and 12.9% who were 65 years of age or older. The median age was 36 years.

For every 100 females, there were 82.3 males. For every 100 females age 18 and over, there were 76.9 males.

The median income for a household in the city was $47,128, and the median income for a family was $55,573. Males had a median income of $41,493 versus $37,871 for females. The per capita income for the city was $24,827. 13.9% of the population and 11.8% of families were below the poverty line. 12.7% of the population was 65 or older.

== Parks and recreation ==
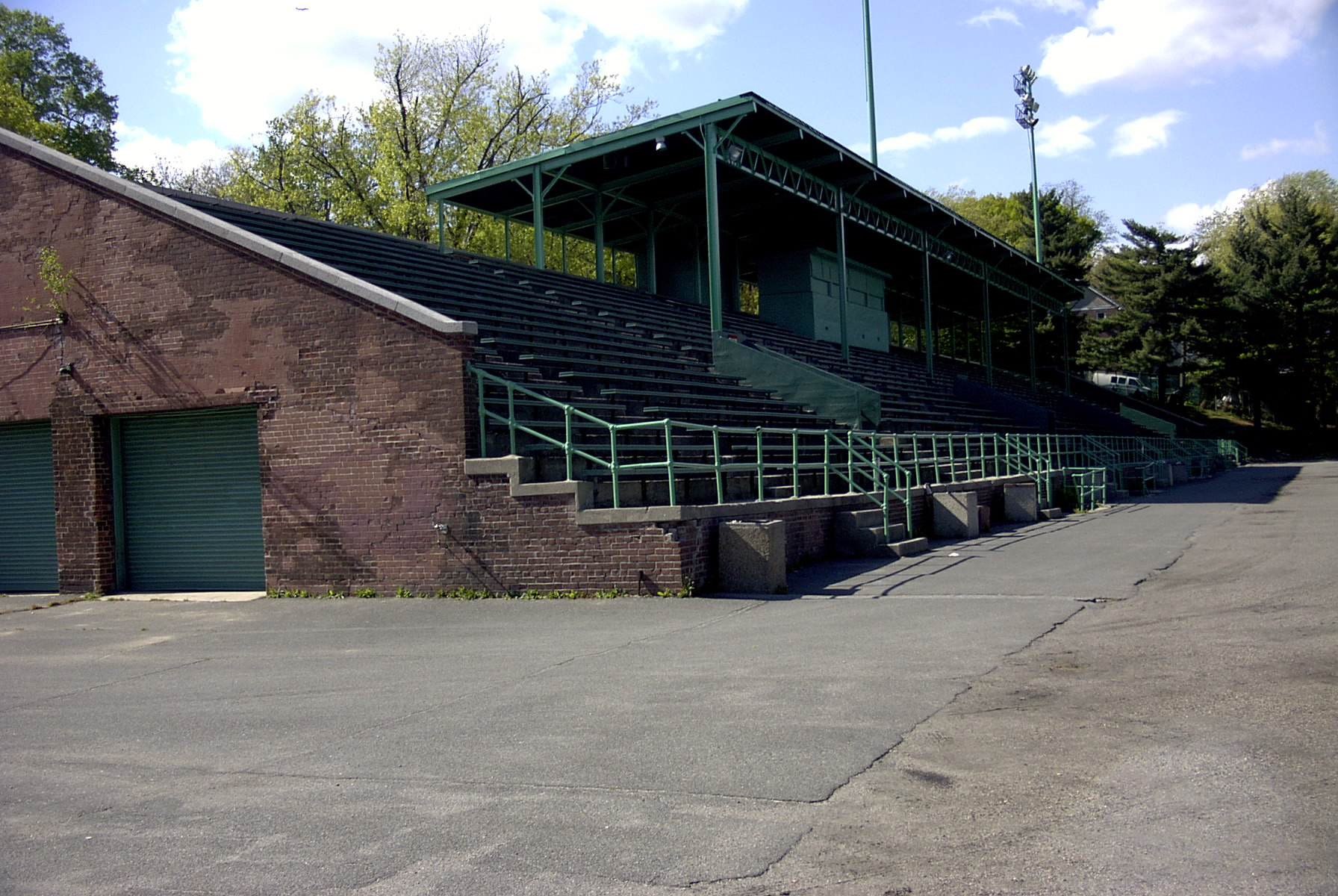
The grandstand at Memorial Field. The aging structure was finally demolished in May 2018.

The city limits contain a number of city parks, and Willson's Woods Park, a 23-acre (93,000 m^{2}) county-owned park. One of the oldest parks in the county system, Willson's Woods has a wave pool, water slides, and a spray deck and water playground, against the backdrop of an English Tudor style bathhouse. The park also has areas for picnicking and fishing.

== Government ==
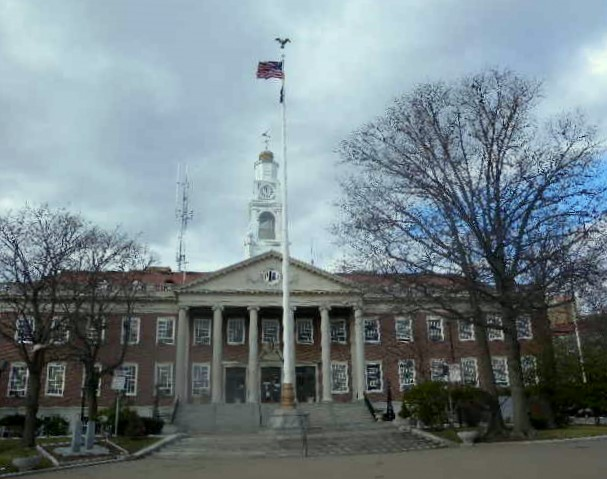
Municipal Building

The City of Mount Vernon is governed by a five-member city council, a mayor, and a comptroller. As per the city charter, to balance power, the mayor runs every four years with two council members, and the comptroller runs two years after the mayor with three council members. Beyond the regular political powers of elected officials, the City of Mount Vernon also has a checks and balances voting session called the Board of Estimate.

=== City council ===
The city council consists of five representatives, elected at-large, one of whom is the city council president. The city council president is appointed/elected by the existing city council members. Under normal circumstances the council presidency is rotated, as are the council committee assignments as chair of the four council committees. In recent years, the full rotation has ceased to reappoint the more experienced council members. The council president also serves as mayor, in the absence of the mayor. This can occur when the mayor is out of town, had resigned, or dies in office. When this happens the president pro tempore becomes acting city council president and the acting president pro tempore becomes assumes their duties.

=== Mayor ===
Mayors of Mount Vernon, New York

Name	Years	Party	Notes
Edward F. Brush	January 1, 1892 – December 31, 1893	Republican	elected to one two-year term
Edson Lewis	January 1, 1894 – December 31, 1895	Republican	elected to one two-year term
Edwin W. Fiske	January 1, 1896 – December 31, 1903	Democratic	elected to four two-year terms
Edward F. Brush	January 1, 1904 – December 31, 1907	Republican (first term); Independent (second term)	elected to two two-year terms
Benjamin Howe	January 1, 1908 – December 31, 1909	Republican	elected to one two-year term
Edwin W. Fiske	January 1, 1910 – December 31, 1917	Democratic	elected to four two-year terms
Edward F. Brush	January 1, 1918 – December 31, 1919	Republican	elected to one two-year term
Elmer L. Kincaid	January 1, 1920 – December 31, 1921	Republican	elected to one two-year term
William D. MacQuesten	January 1, 1924 – December 31, 1927	Republican	elected to one four-year term; did not run for renomination
James Berg	January 1, 1928 – July 2, 1931	Republican	elected to one four-year term; resigned to become secretary of the Westchester County Sanitary Sewer Commission; Berg, by virtue of not filing his letter of resignation was actually in office until 8:45 a. m. on July 2, 1931
Thomas H. Hodge (Acting)	July 2, 1931 – December 31, 1931	Republican	was City Council President, became Acting Mayor after Berg's resignation
Leslie V. Bateman	January 1, 1932 – December 31, 1935	Democratic	elected to one four-year term
Denton Pearsall, Jr.	January 1, 1936 – December 31, 1939	Republican	elected to one four-year term
William Hart Hussey	January 1, 1940 – December 31, 1951	Republican	elected to three four-year terms
Joseph V. Vaccarella	January 1, 1952 – December 31, 1959	Democratic	elected to two two-year terms
P. Raymond Sirignano	January 1, 1960 – December 31, 1963	Republican	elected to one four-year term
Joseph P. Vaccarella	January 1, 1964 – December 31, 1967	Democratic	elected to one four-year term
August P. Petrillo	January 1, 1968 – August 29, 1976	Republican	elected to two four-year terms; died in office
Ronald A. Blackwood (Acting)	August 29, 1976 – December 31, 1976	Republican	was City Council President and a Republican at the time; became Acting Mayor after Petrillo's death; first African-American mayor
Thomas E. Sharpe	January 1, 1977 – October 27, 1984	Democratic	elected to two four-year terms; died in office
Carmella Iaboni (Acting)	October 27, 1984 – February 4, 1985	Democratic	was City Council President, became Acting Mayor after Sharpe's death
Ronald A. Blackwood	February 4, 1985 – December 31, 1995	Democratic	won a special to fill the remainder of Sharpe's unfilled term; elected to two four-year terms
Ernest D. Davis	January 1, 1996 – December 31, 2007	Democratic	elected to three four-year terms; lost to Young in the Democratic primary and the general election
Clinton I. Young, Jr.	January 1, 2008 – December 31, 2011	Democratic	elected to one four-year term; lost to Davis in the election
Ernest D. Davis	January 1, 2012 – December 31, 2015	Democratic	elected to one four-year term
Richard Thomas	January 1, 2016 – July 11, 2019	Democratic	elected to one four-year term; Removed from office by City Council
André Wallace (Acting)	July 12, 2019 – December 31, 2019	Democratic	was City Council President, became Acting Mayor after Thomas's removal from office
Shawyn Patterson-Howard	January 1, 2020 – present	Democratic	elected to one four-year term

=== Comptroller ===
Name	Years	Party	Notes
Maureen Walker	January 1, 1994 – December 31, 2017	Democratic	• elected to five four year terms
Deborah Reynolds	January 1, 2018 – present (after winning an election that features former City Councilman Marcus Griffith, no independent official building have yet to be established by the City of Mount Vernon, authorized by the State of York, or U.S. House of Representative motion to do so as of November 16, 2021)	Democratic	• elected to one four year term

=== Board of Estimate ===
The Board of Estimate is composed of the mayor, the city council president, and the comptroller. The city council president votes on behalf of the city council. All monetary decisions, including the annual budget and many legal ramifications, must pass vote of the Board of Estimate, which meets every Tuesday after the city council's Wednesday legislative session.

== Court system ==
The Mount Vernon city court is part of the New York State Unified Court System. It has three elected full-time judges who serve for ten years and one part-time associate judge who is appointed by the mayor for a period of eight years. The judges of the court are William Edwards, Adrian Armstrong, and Nichelle Johnson. Adam Seiden serves as an associate judge of the court. The court handles a wide variety of cases, including initial processing of all felony criminal cases; handling of all misdemeanor cases from inception through trial; civil proceedings with a limited monetary jurisdiction of up to $15,000; all landlord tenant cases originating in the city; small claims cases; and all vehicle and traffic law matters. The court is housed in the public safety complex, which is adjacent to City Hall.

== Education ==
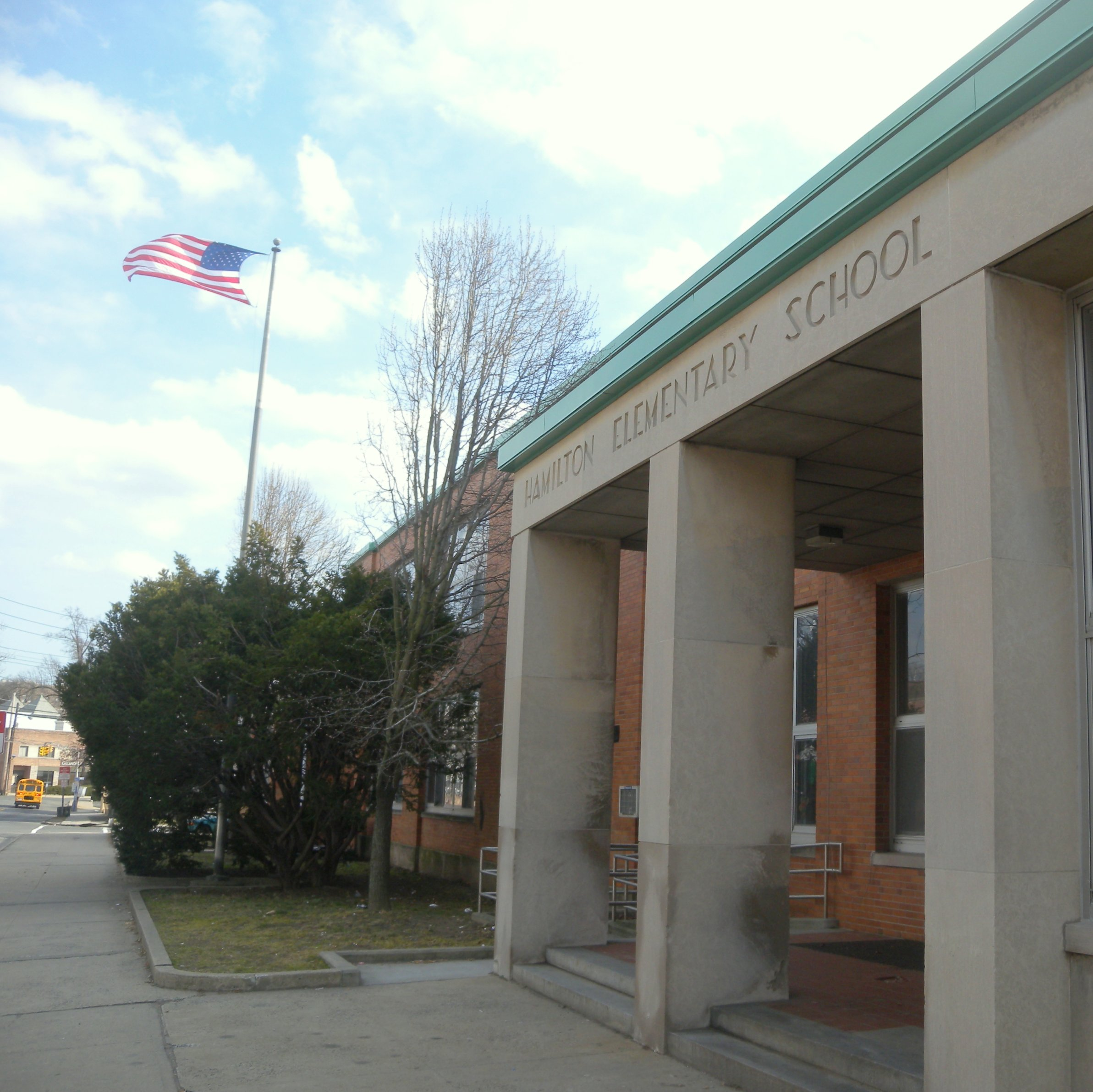
Hamilton Elementary

Mount Vernon City School District includes 11 elementary schools, two middle schools, two high schools and one alternative high school.

Elementary schools	Middle schools	High schools
Cecil H. Parker	Denzel Washington School of the Arts (6-12)	Mount Vernon High School
Columbus	Benjamin Turner	Denzel Washington School of the Arts (7-12)
Edward Williams	Pennington Middle	Nelson Mandela/Dr. Hosea Zollicoffer Alternative High
Graham School		Mount Vernon STEAM Academy
Grimes
Hamilton
Lincoln
Rebecca Turner
Pennington
Traphagen
Mount Vernon Honor Academy (K-8)

Westchester Community College has an extension site education facility, downtown.

In 2011, The Journal News featured an article titled "Region's Aging Schools Crumble as Finances Falter", by Cathey O'Donnell and Gary Stern. The article discussed several old school buildings within the region that were in disrepair, how much it would cost to fix them, and which if any might need to be demolished. The Mount Vernon school district was included in the article, which stated:

"In Mount Vernon, meanwhile, where a high school wall collapsed last year, inspectors flagged buildings for insufficient smoke detectors, poor air quality, evidence of rodents and vermin, halls without emergency lighting and junction boxes with exposed live wires."

== Infrastructure and services ==
=== Fire department ===
The city of Mount Vernon is protected by Fire Department of the City of Mount Vernon (FDMV).The FDMV currently operates out of four firehouses, throughout the city, under the command of the Chief of Operations. The department operates four engine companies and two ladder companies. The department responds to approximately 14,000 emergency calls annually.

=== Police department ===
As of 2021, the Mount Vernon Police Department has 184 officers.

In May 2021, the District Attorney for Westchester County requested intervention by the Department of Justice (DOJ) for civil rights violations by the Mount Vernon Police Department. The DOJ announced its civil investigation in December 2021.

=== Healthcare ===
The 115-year-old Mount Vernon Hospital has 121 beds. It is part of the Montefiore Health System and provides in-patient, critical care, and ambulatory services to residents of Mount Vernon and neighboring communities. The hospital is most known for its premier Chronic Wound Treatment and Hyperbaric Center, which is one of the most advanced in the Northeast. It also offers a variety of services, including the Assertive Community Treatment Center (ACT), the Family Health and Wellness Center, the Hopfer School of Nursing, Hyperbaric Medicine, and Intensive Case Management.

Mount Vernon Hospital is one of four hospitals in the county that provides programs in medicine, nursing, podiatry, and surgery. (Montefiore New Rochelle Hospital, Westchester Medical Center, and White Plains Hospital are the others.)

Mount Vernon Hospital's emergency room treats 25,000 patients a year and is going to be expanded at a cost of $2.5 million, doubling its size from 9,000 to 18,500 square feet (800 to 1,700 m^{2}). The expansion plans include 15 private treatment rooms and upgrades to the waiting area, triage room and other areas in the emergency department.

The area around the hospital has many medical office buildings and treatment facilities which provide healthcare to residents living in Mount Vernon, the southeast section of Yonkers, and the north Bronx, which shares a border with the city. For example, Planned Parenthood Hudson Peconic, the Planned Parenthood affiliate that serves New York's Putnam, Rockland, Suffolk and Westchester Counties, opened its first medical center in Mount Vernon in 1933; the affiliate remains a vital source for reproductive health care services to Mount Vernon residents.

=== Places of worship ===
The city's previous motto was "A City That Believes". This is reflected in the houses of worship in the city that represent more than 25 denominations.

Research has confirmed the tradition that Grace Baptist Church was founded in 1888 by a few women who formerly had been enslaved and it discovered their names: Emily Waller, Matilda Brooks, Helen Claiborne, Sahar Bennett, and Elizabeth Benson.

=== Transportation ===
In late 2005, the RBA Group conducted a study and found that over 5,000 commuters traverse the area on a daily basis; about 3,600 commuters use the Westchester County Bee-Line Bus System, and 1,500 use the Metropolitan Transportation Authority's Metro-North Railroad commuter rail service.

- Petrillo Plaza, adjacent to Metro North's Mount Vernon East station in downtown Mount Vernon, is the hub for Westchester's Bee-Line Bus System service in Mount Vernon. The Mount Vernon's taxi services operate from Petrillo Plaza as well.
- Bee-Line Bus routes serving Mount Vernon are 7, 40, 41, 42, 43, 52, 53, 54, 55, as well as the 91, which operates during the summer.
- A New York City Bus route (MTA) serves two blocks in Mount Vernon along the NYC border. The New York City Bus Bronx Route travels along Mundy Lane (S. 11th Avenue) between W. 5th Street (Nereid Avenue) and W. Sandford Blvd (Pittman Avenue).
- The Metro-North's north–south Harlem Line stops at Mount Vernon West and Fleetwood, both on the western edge of Mount Vernon; the west–east New Haven Line stops at Mount Vernon East, in the heart of downtown.
- Both the 2 and 5 trains (IRT White Plains Road Line) and the 5 train (IRT Dyre Avenue Line) of the New York City Subway system have terminals just south of the Mount Vernon border, served by the Bee-Line. The 2 train terminates at 241st Street in Wakefield. The 5 train terminates at Dyre Avenue in Eastchester. Additionally, the 5 goes to Nereid Avenue during rush hours in the peak direction. Both locations are within 5 minutes walking distance of Southside Mount Vernon.

== Notable people ==
- A.D.O.R.
- Camille Akeju
- Lou Albano
- Debbie Allen
- James Anthony Bailey
- Bob Baldwin
- Larry Barnes
- Rai Benjamin
- Alessandra Biaggi
- John G. Branca
- John R. Branca
- Ralph Branca
- Jonathan Briley
- Art Carney
- Jonathan Stuart Cerullo
- David Chase
- Dick Clark
- Craig Colorusso
- Sean Combs
- Isaiah Cousins
- DMX
- Andre Drummond
- Damion Easley
- Susie Essman
- DJ Eddie F
- Linda Fairstein
- Monroe H. Freedman
- Adelaide Gescheidt
- Robin Givens
- Seth Godin
- Ben Gordon
- Paul Grassi
- Rudy Hackett
- Mark Harris
- Christine E. Haycock
- Heavy D
- W. C. Heinz
- Michael Imperioli
- Kay Johnson
- Kevin Jones
- Andy Karl
- Roz Kelly
- Harvey Kurtzman
- George Latimer
- Benton MacKaye
- Thomas P. Maguire
- Johnny Marks
- Frances Marlatt
- Rodney McCray
- Scooter McCray
- The Mello-Kings
- Stephanie Mills
- Lowes Moore
- Robin Morgan
- Robert Mosbacher
- Sal Mosca
- Asia Nitollano
- Michael O'Keefe
- Floyd Patterson
- Joseph Lincoln Parker
- Sidney Poitier
- Adam Clayton Powell
- Phylicia Rashad
- Leon Robinson
- Pete Rock
- Larry Romano
- Wayne Allyn Root
- James Rowson
- Oliver Sacks
- Davetta Sherwood
- John Simon
- Nina Simone
- Ken Singleton
- Roy Smith
- J. B. Smoove
- Lionel Stander
- Margaret L. Stecker
- John M. Sternhagen
- Al B. Sure!
- Corrinne Tarver
- Earl Tatum
- Denzel Washington
- Barbara Werle
- E. B. White
- Gus Williams
- Ray Williams
- Sylvia Woods

== In popular culture ==
=== Motion pictures ===
==== Advertising ====
- Memorial Field in Mount Vernon was used to film the classic "Mean Joe Greene" Coca-Cola commercial in May 1979.

==== Films ====
Multiple movies have been set in or featured Mount Vernon, such as:

- Dead Presidents (1995)
- Empty Places (1999)
- The Thomas Crown Affair (1999): shot a scene in Willson's Woods Park, which was transformed to look like Central Park; the Vernon Woods co-op complex was used to stage and store equipment during the scene.
- Riding in Cars with Boys (2001)

==== Television ====
- The Leftovers

== See also ==
- Tree Cities USA
