= Margaret L. Stecker =

American economist (1885–1977)

Margaret Loomis Stecker
- Stecker, from the 1906 yearbook of Cornell University
- Born: April 8, 1885; Mount Vernon, New York, U.S.
- Died: March 13, 1977 (aged 91); Fort Lauderdale, Florida, U.S.
- Occupation: Economist

Margaret Loomis Stecker (April 8, 1885 – March 13, 1977) was an American economist and clubwoman. She taught at Mount Holyoke College, served on the research staff for the National Industrial Conference Board in the 1920s, and worked for the Social Security Administration from 1938 to 1955.

== Biography ==
Stecker was born in Mount Vernon, New York, the daughter of Charles H. Stecker and Mary Louise Bates Stecker. Her father was a journalist and editor; her mother was a clubwoman. She graduated from Cornell University in 1906, and earned her PhD there in 1915, with a dissertation titled "The labor policy of the National Founders Association". She was president of the National Federation of Cornell Women's Clubs in the mid-1920s.

Stecker taught economics and sociology at Mount Holyoke College from 1911 to 1915, and joined the school's College Equal Suffrage League. She spoke to community groups about economics topics. She was a researcher for the National Industrial Conference Board in the 1920s, focused on cost of living surveys. She was an economist at the Social Security Administration from 1938 until her retirement in 1955, except during World War II, when she worked on rationing at the Office of Price Administration.

Stecker married civil engineer George Frederic Mueden in 1928. He died in 1951. She died in 1977, in Fort Lauderdale, Florida, at age 91.

== Publications ==
Stecker's studies were published in scholarly journals including The Quarterly Journal of Economics, The American Economic Review, and Journal of the American Statistical Association.

- "The National Founders' Association" (1916)
- "The Founders, the Molders, and the Molding Machine" (1918)
- "Some recent morbidity data;: A summary of seven community sickness surveys made among policyholders of the Metropolitan Life Insurance Company, 1915 to 1917"
- "Family Budgets and Wages" (1921)
- "Wage Studies of the National Industrial Conference Board: A Reply" (1922)
- "Quantity budgets for basic maintenance and emergency standards of living"
- "Owners and Employes" (1929)
- "Industrial Pension Systems" (1934)
- "Intercity Differences In Costs Of Living In March 1935: 59 Cities" (1937, report)
- "More selected findings of the national survey of old-age and survivors insurance beneficiaries, 1951"
