= Merle Alcock =

American opera singer

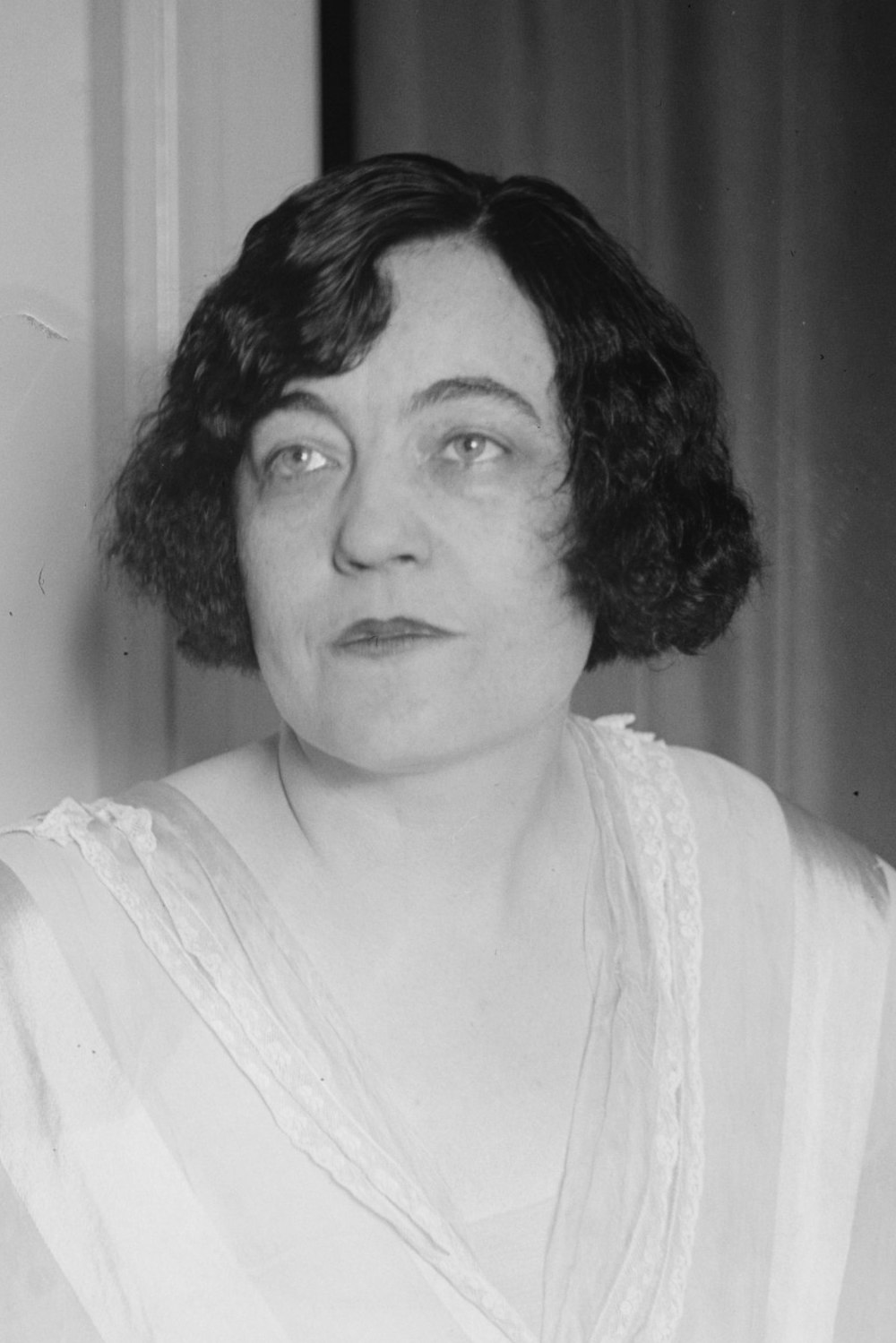
Merle Alcock

Merle Alcock, born Merle Tillotson, (February 6, 1884 - March 1, 1975) was an American contralto who sang with the Metropolitan Opera in 236 performances from 1919 to 1929, officially signing in with them in 1924.

== Early life and education ==
Born Merle Tillotson in Andover, Missouri on February 6, 1884, Merle Alcock was the daughter of the Reverend Elijah Tillotson and his wife Zulina "Zula" Hannah Hiner. She spent much of her childhood in Iowa. Her first musical experiences were as a child performing as a soloist in her father’s church. Her sister, Enid Tillotson, was a soprano who appeared on the concert stage.

Tillotson studied first at Dakota Wesleyan University (then Dakota University) in Mitchell, South Dakota where she was actively performing in school concerts in 1902, 1903, and 1904. Her voice teacher at the university was Grace Goodykoontz. She performed at many public events in Mitchell in 1903; including performing as a soloist in concerts given at the Corn Palace in May and August 1903. She continued to perform at public events and concerts in Mitchell in 1904 and 1905, and was a soloist of the Walter von Geltch Concert Company, a professional performing group in Mitchell.

Tillotson trained further at the Drake Conservatory of Music at Drake University in Des Moines, Iowa. where she began studies in the fall semester of 1905 after transferring to the school from Dakota University. Her voice teacher at Drake was the school’s dean, Frederick Howard. She graduated from the conservatory after one year of study in June 1906. She later studied singing in New York City with Bruno Huhn, and privately with William Wade Hinshaw, Paul Savage and Herbert Witherspoon.

== Early career as a concert and vaudeville singer ==
Tillotson began her performance career while a college student. In March 1906 she was the contralto soloist in the world premiere of Wilhelm Carl Ernst Seeboeck’s cantata As the Season's Come and Go which was given in Des Moines. In the summer of 1906 she was engaged as a concert soloist on the Chautauqua circuit; touring as a member of the Elma Smith Concert Company. One of her fellow soloists in this troupe was her future husband, the tenor Bechtel Alcock. She continued to tour with the company through March 1907; performing in concerts in Indiana, Iowa, Massachusetts, Michigan, Illinois, and Virginia.

After completing her 1906-1907 tour schedule, Tillotson went to New York City to study voice with Paul Savage, a professor of voice at the Metropolitan College of Music in Manhattan. She performed at that music conservatory’s commencement in June 1907. She was once again with the Elma Smith Company for the Fall of 1907, performing in Massachusetts and Illinois.

In 1908 Tillotson joined the La Scala Sextet, a classical vocal group which toured in vaudeville. The group toured in the Orpheum Circuit and Alcock adopted the stage name of Merle Mayew while performing with this group. Some of the theaters where this group performed included the Majestic Theatre in Chicago, B. F. Keiths Grand Opera House in Indianapolis, the Majestic Theatre in Boston, the Colonial Theatre in New York City, and the Columbia Theatre in Cincinnati.

Tillotson returned to New York City where she worked as a paid church vocalist, first at Mount Morris Baptist Church on 126th st and then at Madison Avenue Baptist Church. She was still singing with the latter church as late as 1915. In 1909 she made her first recording for Columbia Records, singing the songs “Sweet Genevieve” by Henry Tucker and “Bonnie Sweet Bessie” by James L. Gilbert. They were released by Columbia in January 1910.

On March 8, 1910 Tillotson married tenor Isaac Bechtel Alcock in Manhattan. Merle and her husband would often perform together. By 1912, she was still referred to by her maiden name in some newspapers, but was also referred to as Merle Tillotson Alcock. By 1914 she was using the name Merle Alcock on the stage, and it is under this name that she became a famous singer.

== Oratorio career ==
In February 1914 Alcock was a featured soloist in a concert of opera excerpts at the Century Opera House in New York City. The following June she made her European debut under the name Merle Tillotson Alcock singing a concert of German lieder with her husband at Claridge's in London as part of a concert series organized by soprano Marta Cunningham. This performance was erroneously described as her “concert debut” in both her obituary in The New York Times and the Großes Sängerlexikon. It was reported in the Mitchell Daily Republican that she performed in an opera in Milan in the summer of 1914.

Alcock was engaged as the contralto soloist for the New York Symphony Orchestra‘s 1915 national tour. From this point on she became a well known oratorio soloist; and was particularly celebrated for her performances of music by George Frideric Handel and Johann Sebastian Bach. In October 1915 she performed in concerts at the Worcester Music Festival. In December 1915 she was the contralto soloist in the New York premiere of Walter Damrosch’s Iphigenia in Aulis with the composer leading the New York Symphony Orchestra. In December 1917 she performed with the Boston Symphony Orchestra and the Handel and Haydn Society under conductor Emil Mollenhauer as the contralto soloist in performances of Handel’s Messiah.

She found a patron in Mrs. Charles Schwab in 1916. Mrs. Schwab was herself a singer as a young woman.

== Opera career ==
Alcock first sang at the Met in a performance of Verdi’s Requiem Mass on Dec. 14, 1919. Her opera debut was on Nov. 15, 1923, when she sang the role of the fiddler Beppe in L’amico Fritz. At the Met she created the role of Ase in the world premiere of Deems Taylor’s The King's Henchman in 1927. She also performed roles in the United States premieres of several operas at the Met, including Laldomine in La cena delle beffe (1926), Elf in La Campana Sommersa (1928) and Mother in Fra Gherardo (1929).

Other roles she performed at the Met included Amneris in Aida, Suzuki in Madama Butterfly, Maddalena in Rigoletto, Cieca in La Gioconda, the Shepherd in Tosca, Lola in Cavalleria rusticana, Kaled in Le Roi de Lahore, Amelfa in Le Coq d'or, Carmela in La Vida breve, the shepherd boy in L'amore dei tre re, Albine in Thaïs, the Nurse in Boris Godunov, the Goatherd in Dinorah, the First Norn in Götterdämmerung, the Sandman in Hansel and Gretel, and Mercédès in Carmen.

In 1924 she portrayed Ortrud in Lohengrin at the Ravinia Festival. In 1930 she toured America with the San Carlo Opera Company as Carmen.

== Later life ==
After retiring from the stage, Alcock worked as a voice teacher in New York City. Some of her more well known pupils included sopranos Isabel Bigley, Eileen Farrell, Helen George, and Ethel Semser; tenor George Maran; mezzo-sopranos Mary Davenport and Eleanor Wold; cabaret singer Page Morton; and actress Betsy von Furstenberg.

Alcock moved to Phoenix, Arizona in 1963. She died at her home in Phoenix on March 1, 1975. She is buried in Wooster Cemetery in Wooster, Ohio.
