= Schleicher & Sons Piano Company =

Defunct piano manufacturer in New York

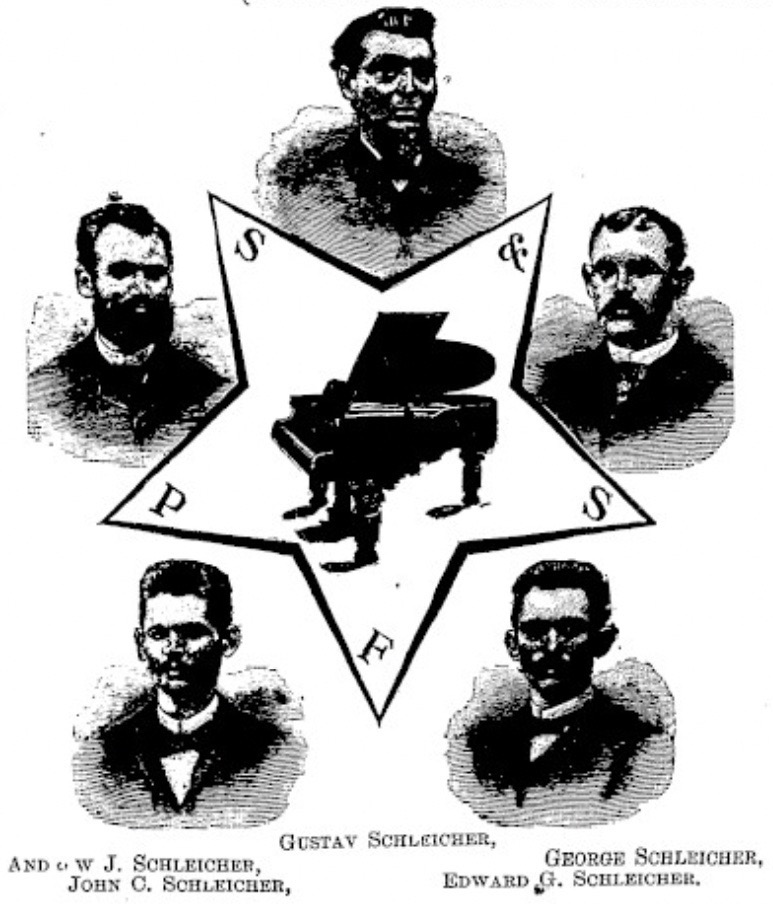
- Schleicher & Sons Piano Company, taken from an 1895 newspaper advertisement
- Industry: Piano manufacturing
- Founded: 1864
- Founder: Gustav Schleicher
- Defunct: 1914
- Headquarters: Mount Vernon, New York, United States
- Area served: Mount Vernon, New York; Stamford, Connecticut; New York City, New York
- Products: Pianos

The Schleicher & Sons Piano Company was a German-American piano company, established in 1864 by Prussian-born German immigrant Gustav Schleicher (1827 — 1905) in New York City. The piano company would grow to three factories, including one in New York City, Mount Vernon, and one in Stamford, Connecticut.

At its apex, over three hundred Schleicher pianos would be in use in the city of Mount Vernon, being constructed in 'the most improved make', according to the newspaper The Chronicle. It would be in business up until its bankruptcy in 1914, however other Schleicher piano companies would be on the market until the 1920s.

== History ==
Gustav Schleicher was born in 1827 in Höxter. He came from a line of German "master-carpenters" (guild members), his father being a carpenter. This knowledge on the trade would help heim establish the company, as he had been in the business since boyhood.

In June 1848, Gustav immigrated to the United States and served a technical apprenticeship at Steinway and Sons for a number of years. Sometime around 1864, Gustav established the Schleicher & Sons Piano Company (his first son was born in the early 1850s), with a factory in Mount Vernon, New York at 52 West First St. In 1866, he established another factory at 9 West Fourteenth St, just down the block from Steinway in New York City. At both locations, pianos would be tuned and repaired as well as made new.

By 1890, the company was thriving, and in 1892, Gustav established another factory in Stamford, Connecticut, at 125 Pacific Street. The building that the company used there is still in use today.

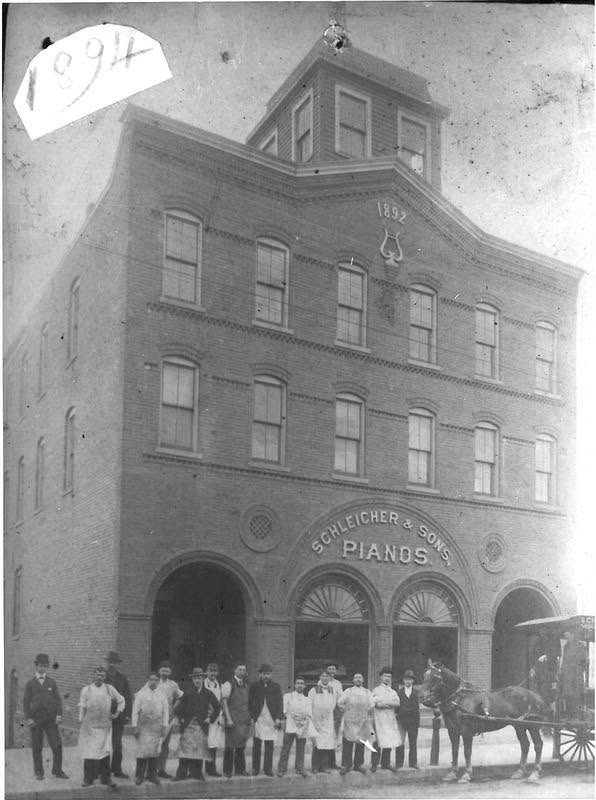
The Schleicher and Sons Piano factory in Stamford, Connecticut.

From 1887 to 1896, the company would publish the "Schleicher and Sons Musical Monthly, A Monthly Magazine Devoted to Music and the Musical Art". The company would produce a song, "The Schleicher March", written by composer Jessie Shay in 1902.

The company would go on to win first premium in the Westchester County Fair for three consecutive years, starting in 1886. In 1895, one of the founder's son's, George Schleicher, completed what was described as a "novel business wagon" in the factory in Stamford Connecticut. The wheels were of corrugated stamped steel, and the hind wheels were much bigger than the front wheels, weighing one hundred pounds each. In 1894, there was a train incident that greatly damaged the factory in New York. The company, amongst others, were rewarded $6000 for the damages.

In 1905, Gustav passed away, and the company was inherited by his four sons. All but three of the four sons would leave the firm shortly thereafter. A public auction notice says it went bankrupt on September 29, 1913, After this, the company was reorganized as Schleicher and Sons, Inc, with George Schleicher Jr, son of the founder's son George, as president. The company would fall apart because of unknown reasons.

== System and operations ==
In the Mount Vernon factory, which covered half an acre of ground, there were twenty-six men, each of whom had accomplished apprenticeships, employed in the factory, turning out between four and five pianos a week. A twenty-horse power machine would furnish the motive power for the works. There were many machines in use in the factory, including a large plainer, a circular saw, a band saw, a boring machine, and a joiner. There was a large elevator in the building for the hoisting and lowering of pianos. The sons of Gustav did all the superintending.

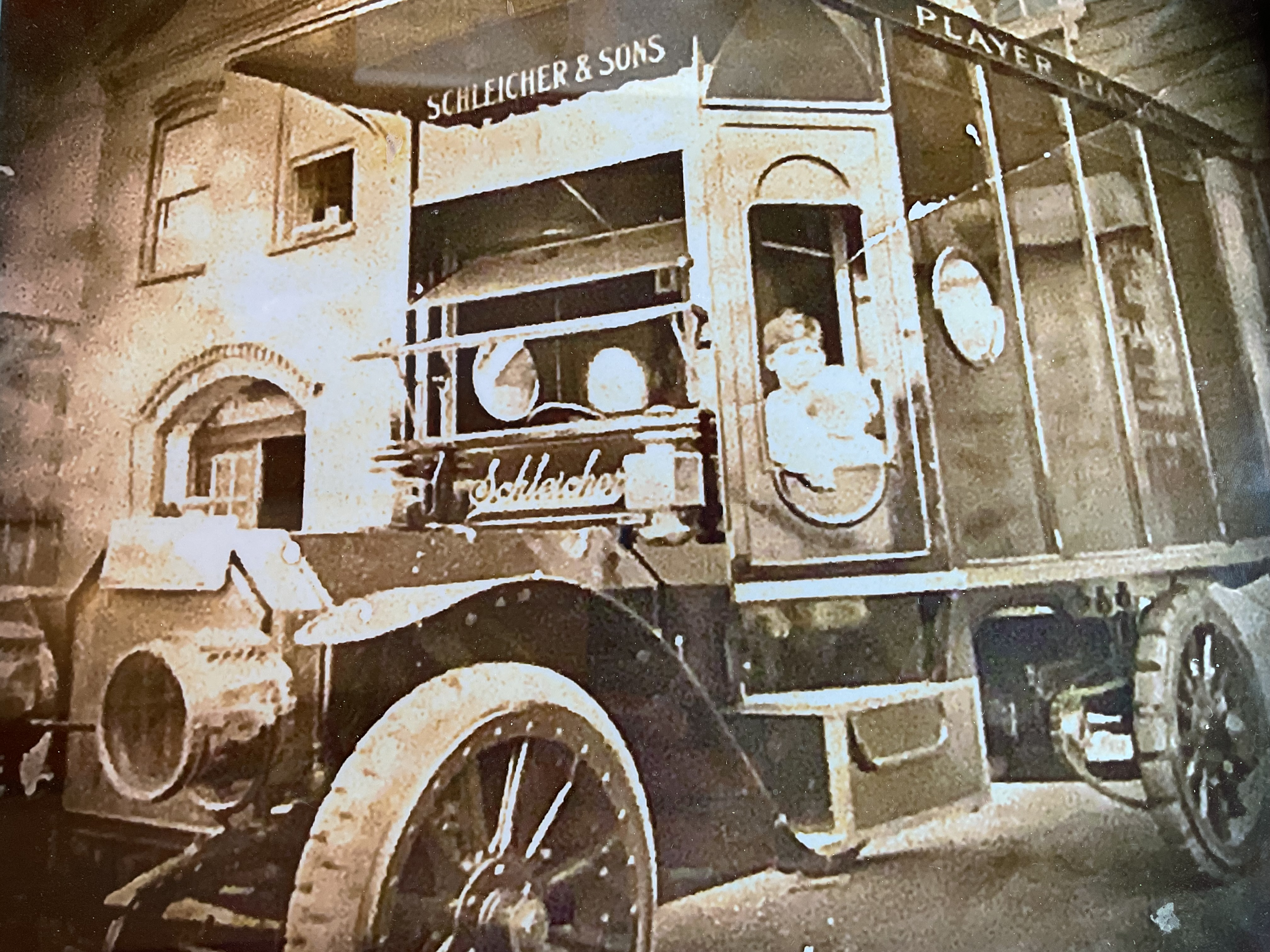
A Schleicher & Sons truck, c. 1895.

The factory in Mount Vernon had three floors. On the first, the general woodworking was done, both for the pianos and stools. The wood that was going to be used for the pianos and stools was first seasoned in a heating room, also on the first floor. On the second floor, the actual making of the pianos and stools was done, while on the third floor, all the varnishing and finishing was done on the third floor. The piano stools were made with quality materials, so that the wood was fitted tightly together and would not move over time. The Chronicle reported that Schleicher pianos were sometimes exchanged for Steinway or Chickering pianos. Other instruments, like violins and banjos, were always on hand and sold. A 'young lady' would always be on hand to play music on a piano if needed on the premises. Visitors were cordially welcome and given tours.

== Inventions and patents ==
Gustav Schleicher and his sons were inventive and oftentimes incorporated much of their inventions into the piano factories. Their most famous patent held the piano's strings in place so that it could stay in perfect tune for long periods of time. They also innovated a sounding board that prevented warping and cracking. This made Schleicher pianos very attractive and durable. In 1879, Gustav patented a "Improvement in circular sawing machines", and it was probably used in his piano factories.
