= Louise Le Baron =

American actress

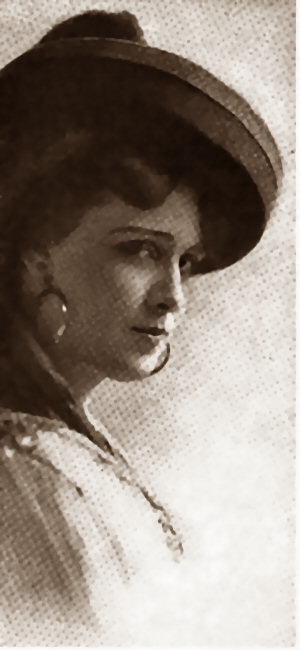
- Portrait from The Cosmopolitan Magazine, 1909
- Born: Louise Shepherd; October 1874; Winchester, Massachusetts
- Died: February 11, 1918 (aged 43); Lincoln, Nebraska

Louise Le Baron (1874–1918) was an American contralto singer who performed in opera and musical theatre during the early years of the twentieth century.

== Biography ==
Louise Le Baron (née Shepherd) was born in Winchester, Massachusetts in 1874, and at around the age of sixteen began singing with a church choir at Boston area engagements. She received her early training at the Boston Conservatory and under various private instructors including Madame Etta Edwards, then in Boston. Le Baron first sang with the Bostonian Opera Company before joining Fritzi Scheff and her famous company. During this time she played Lady Jane in The Two Roses by Ludwig Engländer and Stanislaus Stange, with a libretto adapted from Goldsmith's She Stoops to Conquer, and as Marie Louise de Bouvray in Mlle. Modiste by Victor Herbert and Henry Blossom. Over the following seasons she would perform with the Castle Square Opera Company, San Carlo Company and on two separate occasions the Aborn Opera Company. With the latter she played the title role in Carmen, Seibel in Faust and Suzuki in Madame Butterfly. In 1913 she shared the male role of Alan-a-Dale with actress Florence Wickham in the comic opera Robin Hood by Reginald De Koven and Harry B. Smith.

As her career began to wind down Le Baron settled in Lincoln, Nebraska where she had always been well received and opened a voice school. She died there on February 11, 1918, after struggling with a long and painful illness. She was survived by her son, Ernest Gillmore (or Gilmore), whose father she had married at an early age. At the time of his mother's death Ernest was serving aboard a US Navy torpedo boat.
