= Ronald Blackwood =

Jamaican-American politician (1926–2017)

Mayor of Mount Vernon, New York
- In office February 4, 1985 – December 31, 1995
- Preceded by: Carmella Iaboni
- Succeeded by: Ernest D. Davis
- In office August 29, 1976 – December 31, 1976
- Preceded by: August P. Petrillo
- Succeeded by: Thomas E. Sharpe

Personal details
- Born: 19 January 1926 Saint Andrew Parish, Jamaica
- Died: 22 February 2017 (aged 91) New Smyrna Beach, Florida
- Party: Democratic (since 1981)
- Other political affiliations: Republican (1960–1981)
- Spouse: Ann Griffin Blackwood

Ronald Alexander Blackwood (January 19, 1926 – February 22, 2017) was a Jamaican-born American politician who served as the mayor of Mount Vernon, New York, for eleven years – from 1985 until 1996.

On January 25, 1985, Blackwood became the first African-American person in New York state to be elected as the mayor of a municipality.

== Biography ==
Blackwood was born in Saint Andrew Parish, Jamaica, on January 19, 1926. He immigrated from Jamaica to the United States at the age of 28 and settled in the New York City suburb of Mount Vernon, New York. He received his bachelor's degree in management from Iona College.

=== Career ===
Professionally, Blackwood worked for the Honeywell Corporation's medical electronics division in Pleasantville, New York, for more than 30 years.

Before becoming mayor, Blackwood served as a member of the Westchester County Board of Supervisors (now known as the Westchester County Board of Legislators) and the Mount Vernon city council for four terms.

=== Death ===
Blackwood died from complications of Parkinson's disease at his home in New Smyrna Beach, Florida, on February 22, 2017, at the age of 91. He was survived by his wife and daughter.

=== Personal life ===
Blackwood was married to his wife of 38 years, Ann Griffin Blackwood. The couple had a daughter, Helen Blackwood.

== See also ==
- List of first African-American mayors
