= John Stevens House =

Historic house in New York, United States

- U.S. National Register of Historic Places
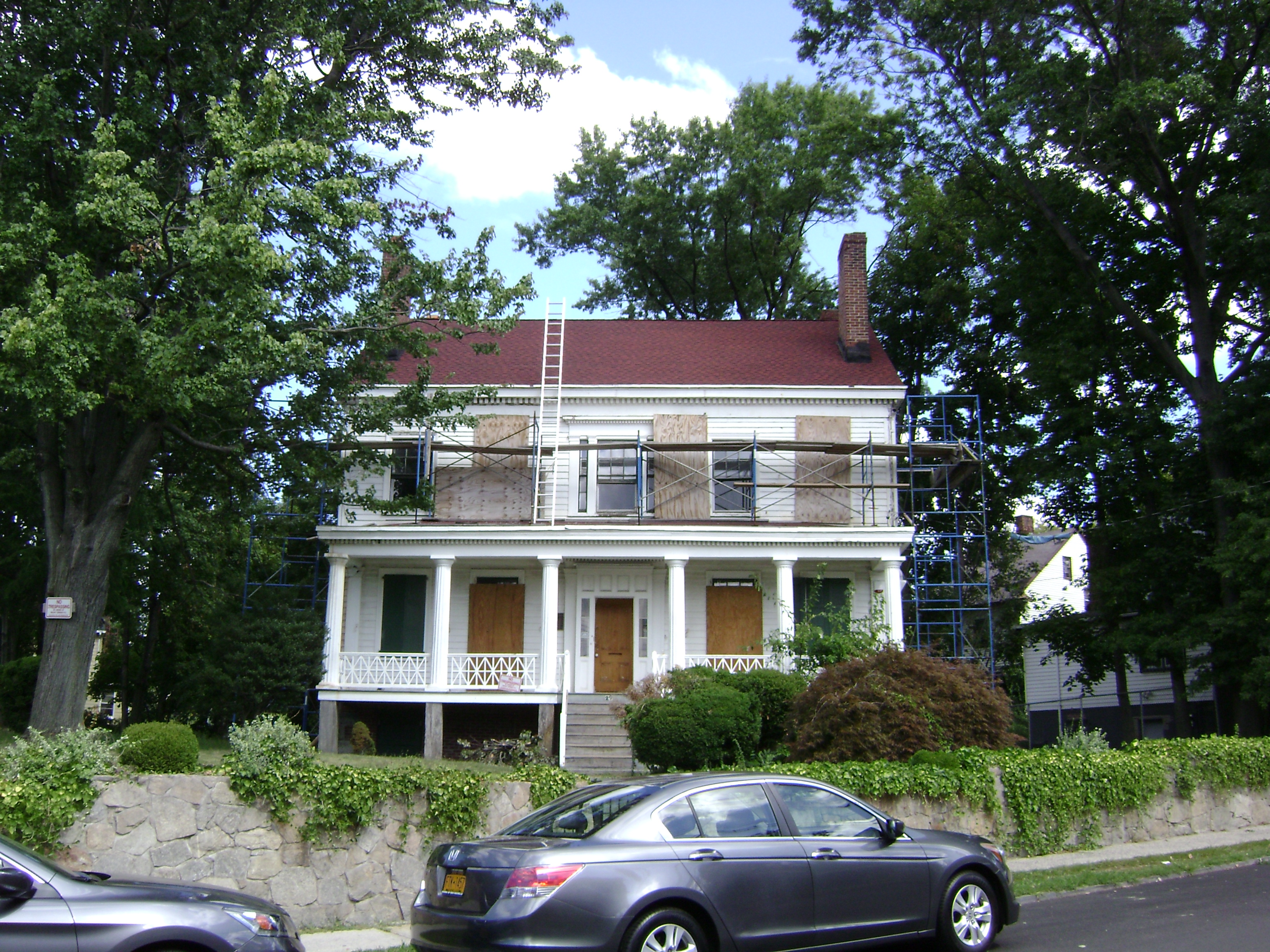

- Location within New York Location within the United States
- Location: 29 W. 4th St., Mount Vernon, New York
- Coordinates: 40°54′15″N 73°50′8″W
- Area: less than one acre
- Built: 1849
- NRHP reference No.: 72000919
- Added to NRHP: April 26, 1972

John Stevens House is a historic home located at Mount Vernon, Westchester County, New York. It was built between 1849 and 1851 and is a five-by-three-bay, 2 1/2-story, substantial frame farmhouse. It features a 1-story porch across the front elevation that incorporates six Doric order columns and a dentiled cornice. It was the home of John Stevens (1803–1882), founder of Mount Vernon.

It was added to the National Register of Historic Places in 1972.

== See also ==
- National Register of Historic Places listings in southern Westchester County, New York
