= Bruno Huhn =

British composer, pianist, organist and conductor (1871–1950)

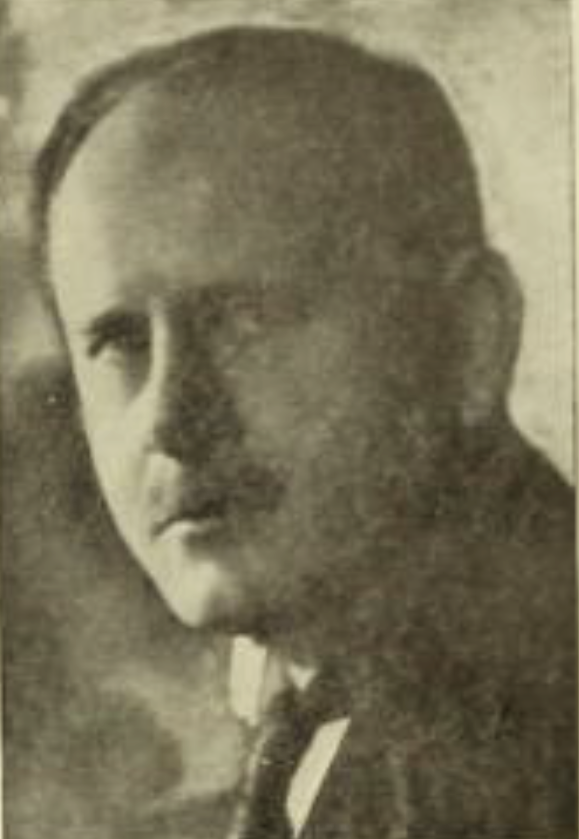
1924 photo of Bruno Huhn

Bruno Siegfried Huhn (1 August 1871 – 13 May 1950) was a British-born American composer, voice teacher, vocal coach, pianist, organist and conductor. Born in London, Huhn trained as a pianist privately and studied music at Trinity College London. He was active as a concert pianist in London and the British provinces from 1881-1889 before embarking on an international concert tour in 1889-1890. After spending some time in Australia at the conclusion of this tour, he returned briefly to England in June and July 1891 and moved to New York City immediately after this. Soon after he became a naturalized American citizen and the remainder of his career was spent in the United States, principally in New York City. There he was active as a church organist and choir master, choral conductor of community choirs, composer, and a highly celebrated vocal coach and voice teacher. Several of his vocal students became principal singers at the Metropolitan Opera. At the time of his death, The New York Times said he was best known for his musical setting of W.E. Henley's poem "Invictus".

== Life and career ==
Born in London on 1 August 1871, Huhn was the son of German immigrants to England, Woltomar Huhn (1832–1913) and Laura Mathilde von Stermfels (1845–1906). He studied piano under Sophie Taunton, and at an early age studied music theory with private tutors. He received a Licentiate from the Trinity College London with an honors certificate in music.

Huhn was active as concert pianist in London and the British provinces from 1881-1889. In 1889 he began an 18-month long international tour that included concerts in Spain, Italy, Egypt, India and Australia. He remained in Australia after the tour completed, and returned briefly to England in June and July 1891 when he was engaged in concerts at St James's Hall.

In 1891 Huhn moved to New York City. He became a naturalized American citizen soon after, and spent the remainder of his career in the United States. A self-taught organist, Huhn held organist posts at a variety of New York churches; including Madison Avenue Baptist Church and Plymouth Church in Brooklyn. For fourteen years he was the conductor of the Banks Glee Club; a community chorus in New York City that presented bi-annual choral concerts at Carnegie Hall. From 1915-1917 he was the conductor of both the Nylic Choral Society and the Arbuckle Institute Choral Club. Other community choirs he conducted included the Orpheus Club of Ridgewood, New Jersey, the Glee Club of the Junior League of New York, and the Choral Club of Forrest Hill, Queens; the latter of which he founded.

Huhn worked as a professional accompanist in New York City for vocalists. He also was a celebrated voice teacher and vocal coach. Principal artists at the Metropolitan Opera who studied voice with Huhn included bass Edward Lankow (1883-1940), baritone Fred Patton (d. 1951), and contraltos Florence Wickham, Merle Alcock, and Lila Robeson (1880-1960). Other voice students of note included sopranos Alice Eversman and Charlotte Lund, tenor John Barnes Wells, baritone Royal Dadmun (1884-1964), and well known voice teacher Adelaide Gescheidt.

In 1943 Huhn's wife, Margaret McConnell Huhn, died. Bruno Huhn died seven years later in Manhattan on 13 May 1950 at the age of 78.

== Partial list of compositions ==
- Te Deum Laudamus for soloists, chorus, orchestra and organ;
- Jubilate Deo for soloists, chorus, orchestra and organ; and
- Various settings of poems for voice and piano, including "Eldorado" and "Israfel" by Edgar Allan Poe, "The Unknown" by Walt Whitman, and "Invictus" by W.E. Henley.
- Invictus, song
