= Estelle Gray-Lhevinne =

American violinist (1892–1933)

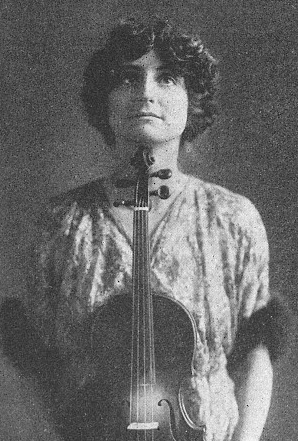
- Estelle Gray Lhevinne, from a 1914 publication
- Born: Estelle Franklin Gray; 1892; California, U.S.
- Died: May 23, 1933 (aged 40–41); Boston, Massachusetts, U.S.
- Occupations: Violinist, songwriter

Estelle Franklin Gray Lhevinne (1892 – May 23, 1933) was an American violinist and songwriter. She toured the United States and Europe as a girl, and later made tours with her first husband and with their son, both pianists.

== Early life and education ==
Gray was born in California, the daughter of Simon J. Gray and Margaret Ludgate Gray. Her father was from Canada and ran a shoe store. Her musical aptitude was evident very early, and she began performing as a violinist for audiences as a young child in San Francisco. She gave concerts in New York City and toured the United States and Europe while she was a teenager, with her mother as tour manager and chaperone.

== Career ==
Gray toured in the United States with pianist and composer Moritz "Mischa" Lhevinne from 1913 to 1917, organized by Redpath Management. They also wrote songs together. She played a 1715 Cremona violin. It was damaged when she fell on an Iowa sidewalk in 1917. "I mean it when I say that it would have meant far less to me to have broken a limb," she wrote of the accident.

After the Lhevinnes' professional and personal partnership dissolved in 1922, Gray-Lhevinne continued touring the United States as a solo performer. She was known for her informal talks between musical offerings, sharing the history of her instrument or of the composition at hand. "Gray-Lhevinne makes her art human, she makes her violin a messenger and on its pure and beautiful tones wafts a friendly greeting to the audience entranced before her", reported The Music News in 1929. Her gowns were also considered noteworthy.

In 1928 Gray-Lhevinne had her nose "remodeled" to more closely resemble her young son's. In 1929, she toured with her son, a piano student. They appeared in advertisements together, endorsing a piano instruction program.

== Publications ==
- "The Heart of my Opal" (1916, song, with Mischa Lhevinne)
- "Democracy's Call: Swat the Bugaboo" (1917, song, with Mischa Lhevinne)
- "My Song: Original Poem and Melody" (1921)

== Personal life ==
Gray married Moritz Lhevinne in San Francisco in August 1914, while they were touring together. Their son, known as "Laddie Gray", was born in 1919. They divorced in 1922, and she remarried in 1923, to James L. Heynemann. She died in 1933, in her early forties, at a hospital in Boston.

Laddie Gray was left to her father's care, but Simon Gray also died a few months later. The boy was reunited with his father in 1934. As Paul Lhevinne, he joined the Air Force during World War II. He was reported missing in action in May 1944.
